= Gulfport station =

Train station in Gulfport, Mississippi, US

Gulfport, MS
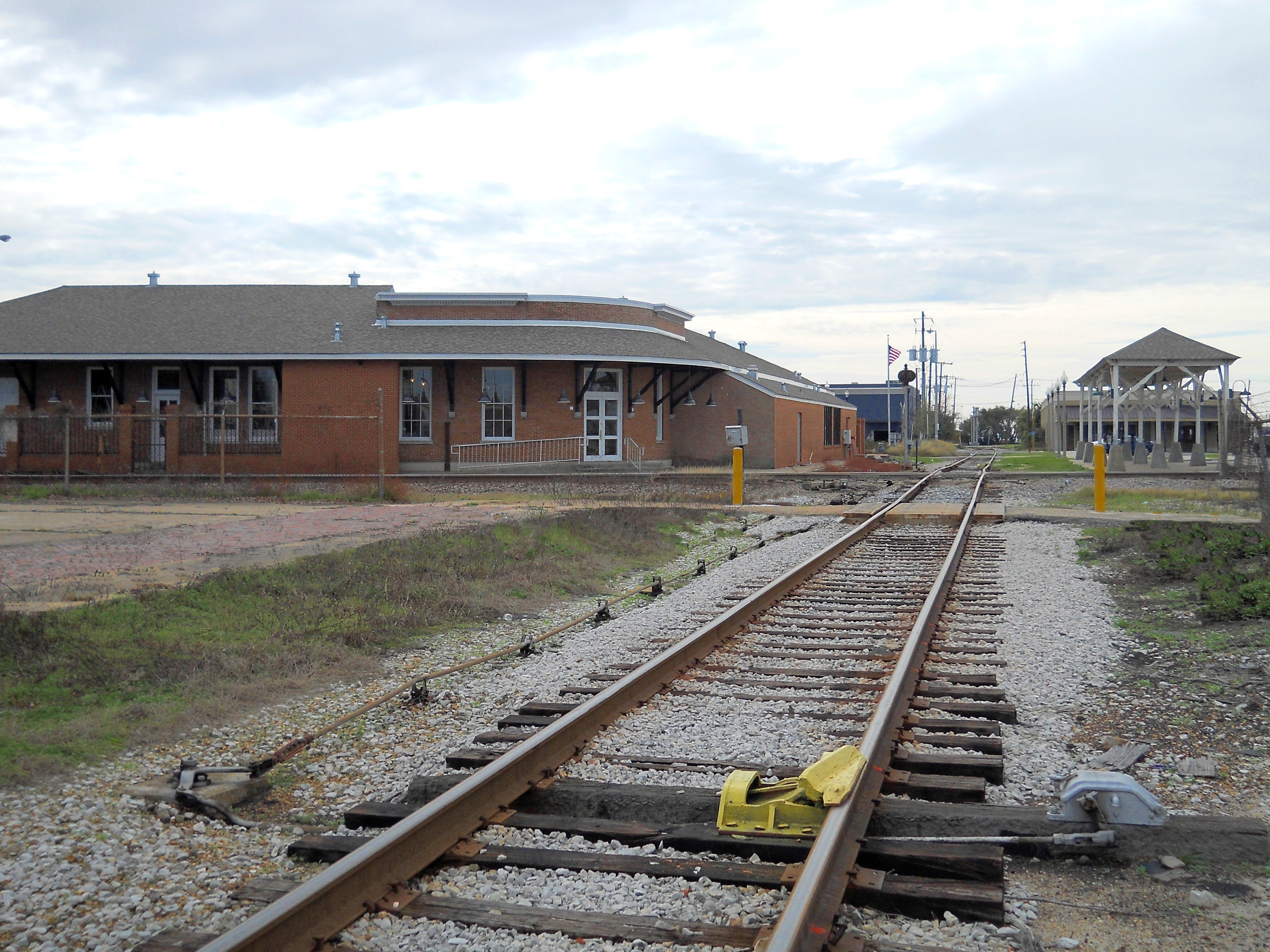
- Union Station in 2012

General information
- Location: 1419 27th Avenue; Gulfport, Mississippi
- Coordinates: 30.3688°N 89.0950°W
- Line: CSX NO&M Subdivision
- Platforms: 1 side platform
- Tracks: 2
- Connections: Coast Transit Authority

Other information
- Station code: Amtrak: GUF

History
- Opened: c. 1880s; 1984; March 31, 1993; August 18, 2025
- Closed: 1971; 1985; August 28, 2005
- Rebuilt: July 1904

Passengers
- FY 2025: 2,278 (Amtrak)

Services
Preceding station	Amtrak	Following station
Bay St. Louis toward New Orleans	Mardi Gras Service	Biloxi toward Mobile
Former services
Preceding station	Amtrak	Following station
Bay St. Louis toward Los Angeles	Sunset Limited (1993–2005)	Biloxi toward Orlando or Miami
Bay St. Louis toward New Orleans	Gulf Coast Limited (1984–1985, 1996–1997)	Biloxi toward Mobile
Preceding station	Illinois Central Railroad	Following station
Landon toward Jackson	Gulf and Ship Island Railroad	Terminus
Preceding station	Louisville and Nashville Railroad	Following station
Pass Christian toward New Orleans	Main Line	Mississippi City toward Cincinnati

Mississippi Landmark
- Gulf and Ship Island Railroad Station
- U.S. Historic district – Contributing property
- Part of: Gulfport Harbor Square Commercial Historic District (ID11000762)
- Added to NRHP: October 25, 2011
Location

Gulfport station is an Amtrak intercity train station in Gulfport, Mississippi, United States. It is served by the two daily round trips of the Mardi Gras Service. The station and an adjacent shelter are listed on the National Register of Historic Places as contributing properties to the Gulfport Harbor Square Commercial Historic District. The building serves as the Gulfport Centennial Museum.

== History ==
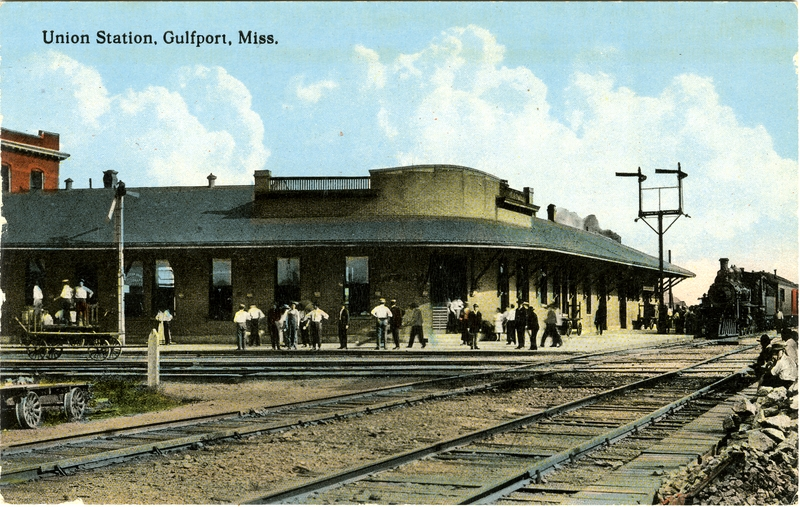
Postcard of Gulfport station in early 1900s

The New Orleans, Mobile and Chattanooga Railroad opened between Mobile and New Orleans on November 21, 1870. It became the New Orleans, Mobile and Texas Railway soon after and was acquired by the Louisville and Nashville Railroad (L&N) in 1881. Gulfport was founded in the late 1880s as the planned terminal for the Gulf and Ship Island Railroad, which aimed to use the deepwater harbor protected by Ship Island. That railroad was completed from Gulfport to Hattiesburg in 1896.

By the early 20th century, the L&N had a wooden passenger station located slightly east of 27th Avenue. In 1903, the railroads began work on a union station in the southeast quadrant of their crossing in Gulfport. The red brick building was completed in 1904.

In December 1924, the Illinois Central Railroad (IC) and the Gulf and Ship Island began operating through sleepers between Gulfport, Chicago, and Memphis. The IC acquired the Gulf and Ship Island in 1925. The IC discontinued Jackson–Gulfport passenger service in November 1950.

Former L&N services to Gulfport included the Gulf Wind (New Orleans–Jacksonville), Pan-American (New Orleans–Cincinnati) and Humming Bird (New Orleans–Cincinnati). The L&N also operated the southern leg of the Crescent and Piedmont Limited through the station under contract to the Southern Railway).

Amtrak service began with the Gulf Coast Limited, which operated between 1984 and 1985 and called at the station. The stop was reactivated on March 31, 1993 in service on the Sunset Limited. Service east of New Orleans was suspended after Hurricane Katrina struck the Gulf Coast in 2005.

The station was a contributing property to the Harbor Square Historic District which was added to the National Register of Historic Places on August 13, 1985. On January 15, 1986, the depot was also designated a Mississippi Landmark by the Mississippi Department of Archives and History. The historic district was significantly affected by Hurricane Katrina. It was replaced by the Gulfport Harbor Square Commercial Historic District on October 25, 2011. The new district includes the station and an adjacent shelter as contributing properties.

In anticipation of a new service between New Orleans and Mobile, Amtrak installed new station signs in 2023. Service to Gulfport returned with the establishment of the Mardi Gras Service between New Orleans, Louisiana and Mobile, Alabama on August 18, 2025.
