= Biloxi station =

Railway station in the US state of Mississippi

Biloxi, MS
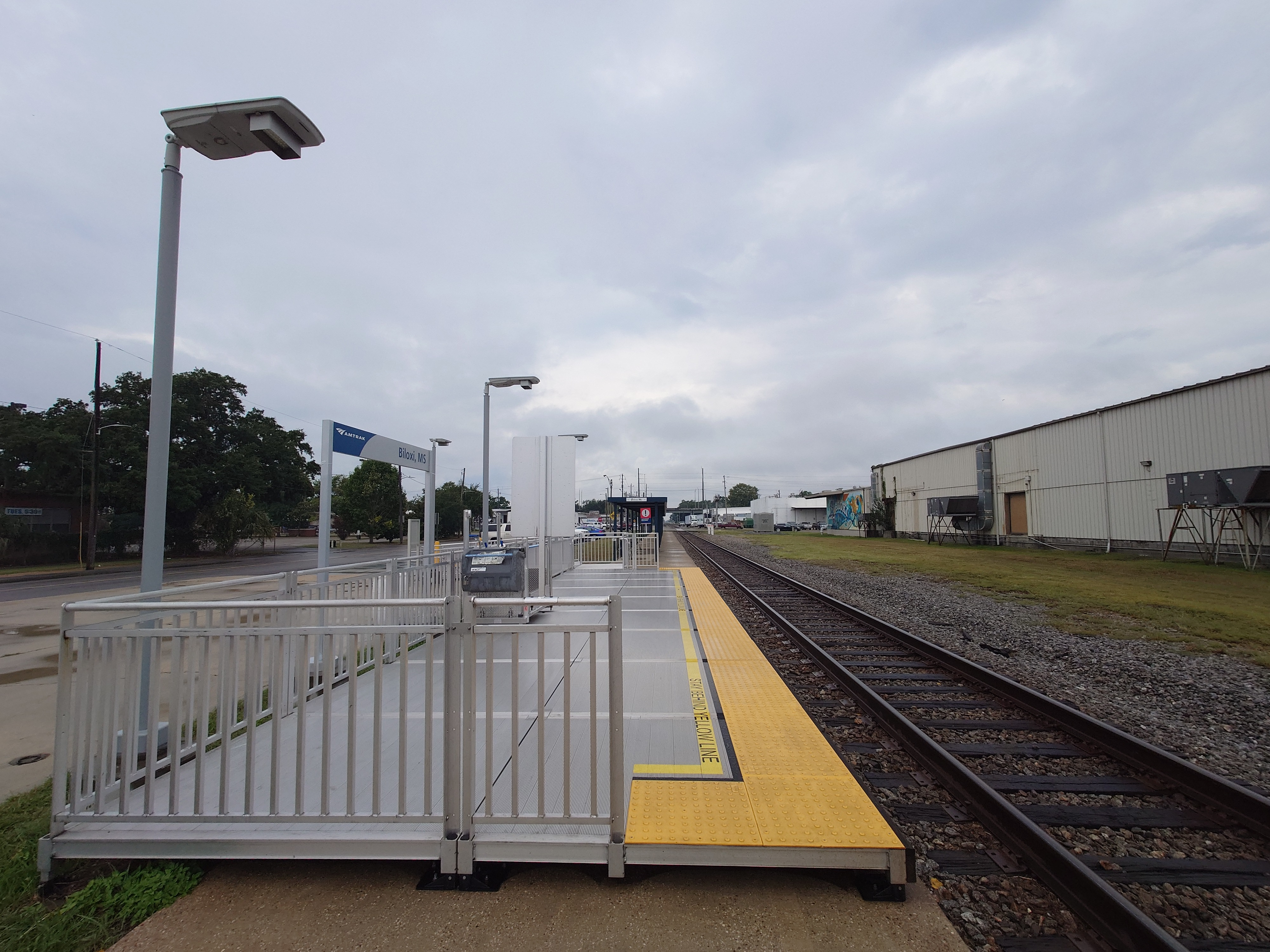
- The platform at Biloxi in 2025

General information
- Location: 860 Esters Boulevar; Biloxi, Mississippi
- Coordinates: 30.3989°N 88.8915°W
- Line: CSX NO&M Subdivision
- Platforms: 1
- Tracks: 1
- Connections: Coast Transit Authority; Greyhound Lines

Other information
- Station code: Amtrak: BIX

History
- Opened: April 29, 1984; March 31, 1993; August 18, 2025
- Closed: January 6, 1985; August 28, 2005

Passengers
- FY 2025: 3,009 (Amtrak)

Services
| Preceding station | Amtrak | Following station |
|---|---|---|
| Gulfport toward New Orleans | Mardi Gras Service | Pascagoula toward Mobile |
| Gulfport toward New Orleans | Mardi Gras Service | Ocean Springs Special events only toward Mobile |
Former services
| Preceding station | Amtrak | Following station |
|---|---|---|
| Gulfport toward Los Angeles | Sunset Limited (1993–2005) | Pascagoula toward Orlando or Miami |
| Gulfport toward New Orleans | Gulf Coast Limited (1984–1985, 1996–1997) | Pascagoula toward Mobile |
Location

Biloxi station is an Amtrak intercity train station in Biloxi, Mississippi. There is no station building; there is only a platform. The station is across the street from the Biloxi Transit Center, which serves Coast Transit Authority and Greyhound buses.

Amtrak service to Biloxi began with the Gulf Coast Limited, which operated between 1984 and 1985. The stop was reactivated on March 31, 1993 in service on the Sunset Limited. Damage to the rail line resulting from Hurricane Katrina in 2005 caused Amtrak to suspend service east of New Orleans, including at Biloxi. Service to Biloxi returned with the establishment of the Mardi Gras Service between New Orleans, Louisiana and Mobile, Alabama on August 18, 2025.

== Prior station ==
Into the late 1960s, at another Biloxi station, the Louisville & Nashville operated the daily trains, Gulf Wind (New Orleans–Jacksonville), Pan-American (New Orleans–Cincinnati) and Humming Bird (New Orleans–Cincinnati), as well as an additional unnamed day train (New Orleans–Jacksonville). Additionally, the Southern Railway operated the Crescent and Piedmont Limited (both: New Orleans–New York) through that station.
