= Pascagoula station =

Train station in Pascagoula, Mississippi, US

Pascagoula, MS
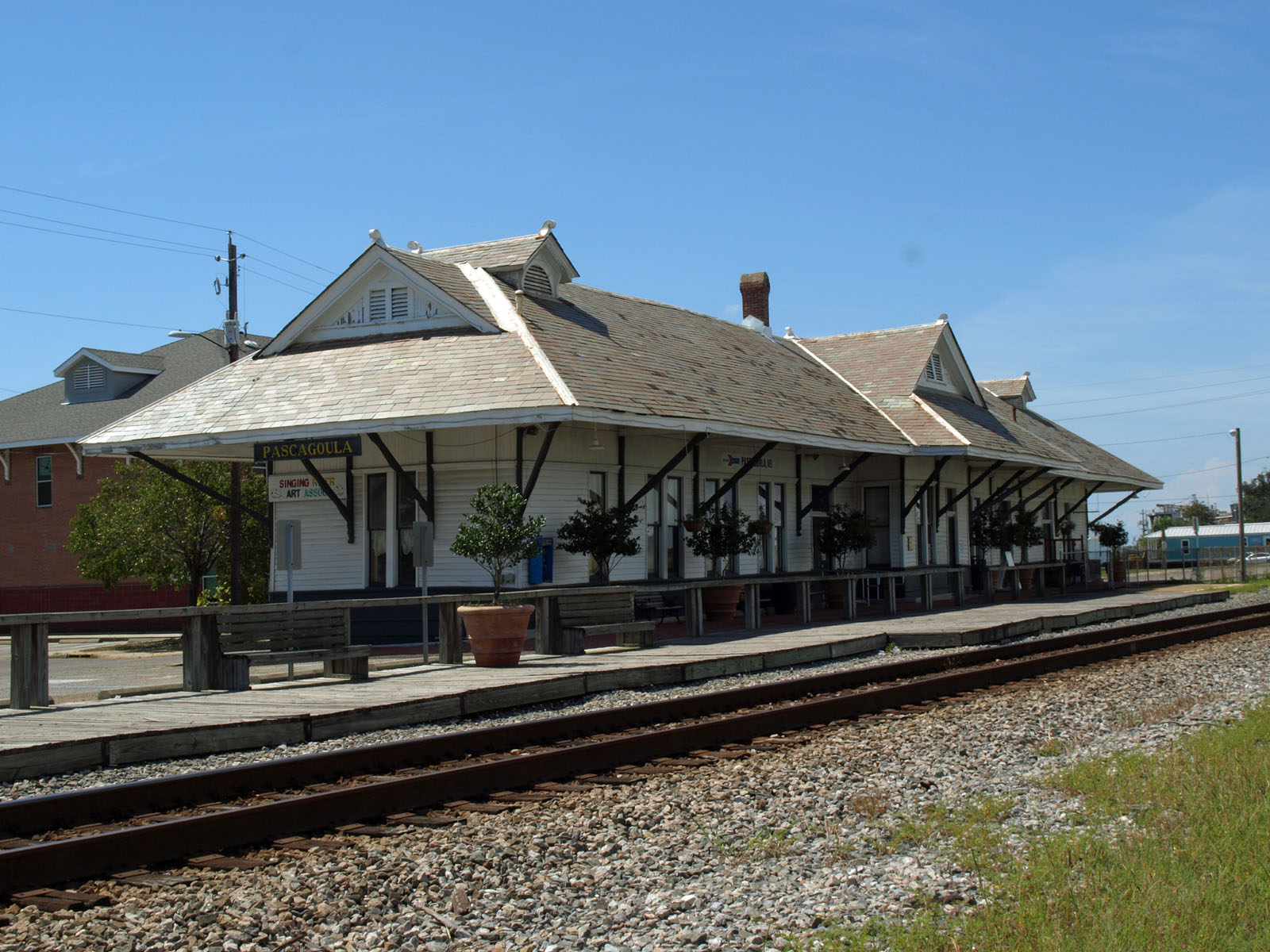
- Louisville & Nashville Railroad Depot in September 2012

General information
- Location: 505 Railroad Avenue; Pascagoula, Mississippi
- Owner: City of Pascagoula
- Line: CSX NO&M Subdivision

Other information
- Station code: Amtrak: PAG

History
- Opened: 1904 (L&N); April 29, 1984 (Amtrak); March 31, 1993; August 18, 2025
- Closed: 1971 (L&N); January 6, 1985 (Amtrak); August 28, 2005

Passengers
- FY 2025: 1,029 (Amtrak)

Services
Preceding station	Amtrak	Following station
Biloxi toward New Orleans	Mardi Gras Service	Mobile Terminus
Ocean Springs Special events only toward New Orleans	Mardi Gras Service	Mobile Terminus
Former services
Preceding station	Amtrak	Following station
Biloxi toward Los Angeles	Sunset Limited (1993–2005)	Mobile toward Orlando or Miami
Biloxi toward New Orleans	Gulf Coast Limited (1984–1985, 1996–1997)	Mobile Terminus
Preceding station	Louisville and Nashville Railroad	Following station
Gautier toward New Orleans	Main Line	Orange Grove toward Cincinnati
- Louisville and Nashville Railroad Depot
- U.S. National Register of Historic Places
- Mississippi Landmark
- Location: Pascagoula, Mississippi, USA
- Coordinates: 30°22′3.52″N 88°33′34.33″W
- Built: 1904
- NRHP reference No.: 74001063
- USMS No.: 059-PAS-0194-NR-ML

Significant dates
- Added to NRHP: August 27, 1974
- Designated USMS: October 11, 1985
Location

Pascagoula station is an intercity train station in Pascagoula, Mississippi, United States. It originally served the Louisville and Nashville Railroad, and is currently a stop for Amtrak's Mardi Gras Service. The station is on the National Register of Historic Places as the Louisville and Nashville Railroad Depot, and was designated a Mississippi Landmark by the Mississippi Department of Archives and History. In addition, the station serves as an art gallery owned by the Singing River Art Association.

== History ==
The station building was constructed by the Louisville & Nashville Railroad (L&N) in 1904. The waiting room was enlarged in 1918.

Former L&N trains that served the station included the Crescent (New Orleans–New York), Pan-American (New Orleans–Cincinnati) and Humming Bird (New Orleans–Chicago and Cincinnati). Intercity passenger train service ended in 1971. The station building was restored during the 1970s, and was placed on the National Register of Historic Places in 1974.

Amtrak service began with the Gulf Coast Limited, which operated between 1984 and 1985. The stop was reactivated on March 31, 1993, in service on the Sunset Limited. Damage to the rail line resulting from Hurricane Katrina in 2005 caused Amtrak to suspend service east of New Orleans, including at Pascagoula. Service to Pascagoula returned with the establishment of Amtrak's Mardi Gras Service between New Orleans, Louisiana and Mobile, Alabama on August 18, 2025.
