= Gulf Coast of the United States =

Region of the US bordering the Gulf of Mexico

Gulf Coast
- Coastline
- States that border the gulf are shown in red.
- Country: United States
- States: Alabama; Florida; Louisiana; Mississippi; Texas
- Principal cities: Houston; Tampa; Mobile; New Orleans; Pensacola; Gulfport; Tallahassee
- Largest city: Houston
- Largest metropolitan area: Greater Houston

Population (2019)
  - Total: 15,800,000

The Gulf Coast of the United States, also known as the Gulf South or the South Coast, is the coastline along the Southern United States where they meet the Gulf of Mexico. The coastal states that have a shoreline on the Gulf of Mexico are Texas, Louisiana, Mississippi, Alabama, and Florida, and these are known as the Gulf States.

The economy of the Gulf Coast area is dominated by industries related to energy, petrochemicals, fishing, aerospace, agriculture, and tourism. The large cities of the region are (from west to east) Brownsville, Corpus Christi, Houston, Galveston, Beaumont, Lake Charles, Lafayette, Baton Rouge, New Orleans, Gulfport, Biloxi, Mobile, Pensacola, Panama City, St. Petersburg, and Tampa. All are the centers or major cities of their respective metropolitan areas and many contain large ports.

== Geography ==
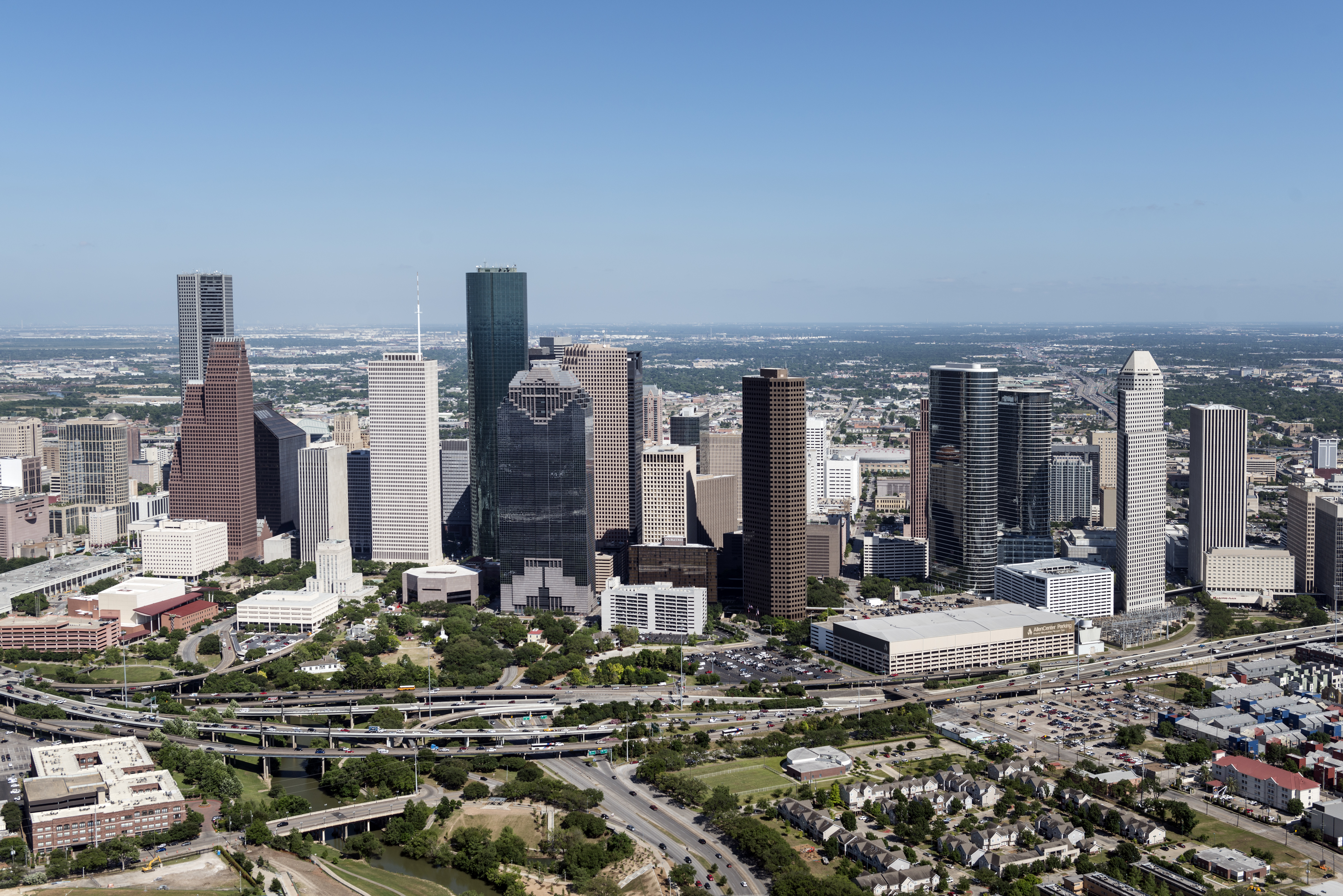
Houston is the largest city and urban area along the Gulf Coast.

The Gulf Coast is made of many inlets, bays, and lagoons. The coast is intersected by numerous rivers, the largest of which is the Mississippi River. Much of the land along the Gulf Coast is, or was, marshland. Ringing the Gulf Coast is the Gulf Coastal Plain, which reaches from Southern Texas to the western Florida panhandle, while the western portions of the Gulf Coast are made up of many barrier islands and peninsulas, including the 130-mile (210 km) Padre Island along the Texas coast. These landforms protect numerous bays and inlets by providing a barrier to oncoming waves. The central part of the Gulf Coast, from eastern Texas through Louisiana, consists primarily of marshland. The eastern part of the Gulf Coast, predominantly Florida, is dotted with many bays and inlets.

=== Climate ===
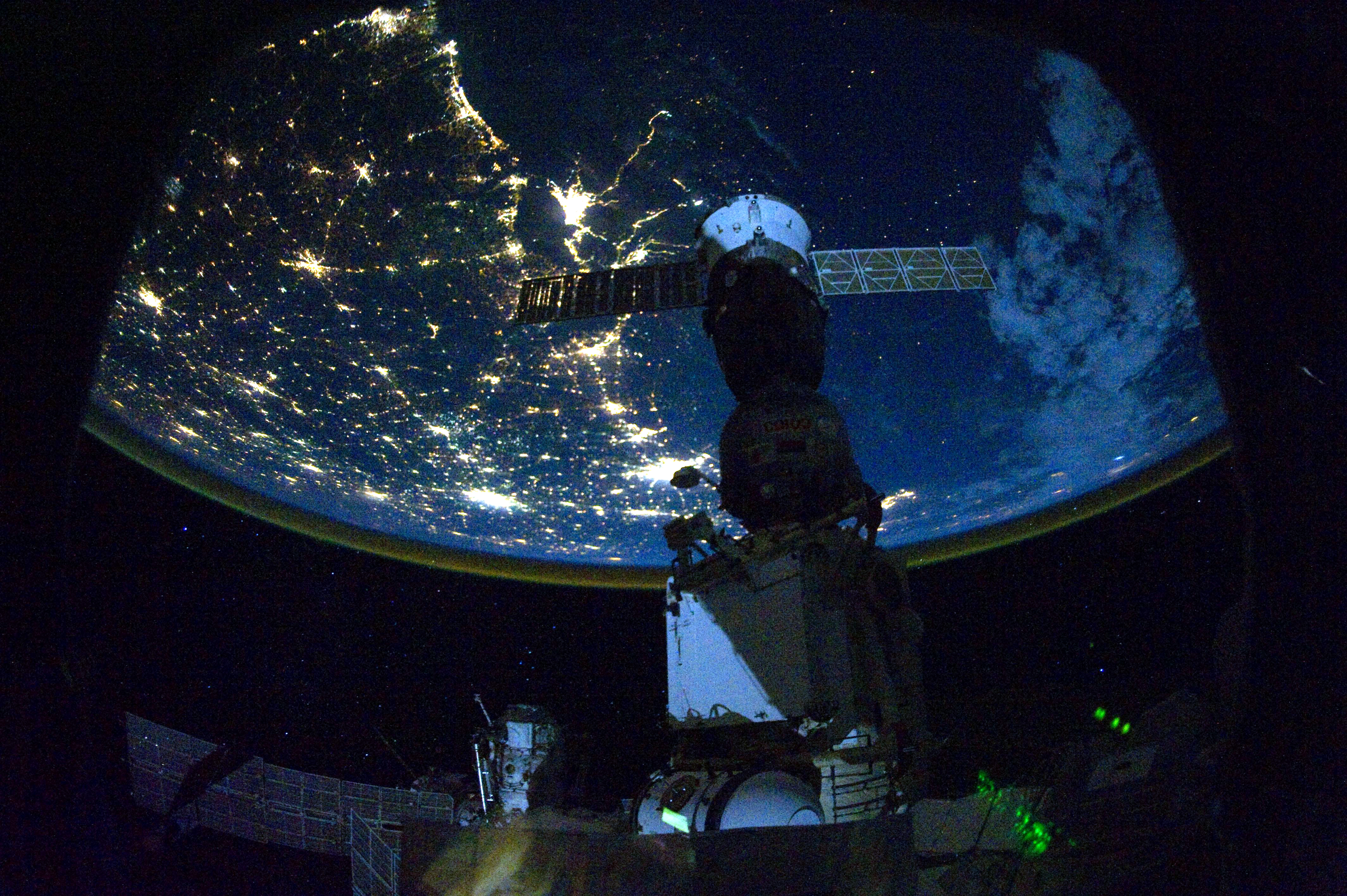
Night time astronaut image of the northern Gulf coast, specifically the Mississippi River Delta and southern Louisiana.

The Gulf Coast climate is humid subtropical, although Southwest Florida features a tropical climate. Much of the year is warm to hot along the Gulf Coast, while the three winter months bring periods of cool (or rarely, cold) weather mixed with mild temperatures. The area is highly vulnerable to hurricanes as well as floods and severe thunderstorms. Much of the Gulf Coast has a summer precipitation maximum, with July or August commonly the wettest month due to the combination of frequent summer thunderstorms produced by relentless heat and humidity, and tropical weather systems, including tropical depressions, tropical storms, and hurricanes, while winter and early spring rainfall also can be heavy.

This pattern is evident in southern cities such as Houston; New Orleans; Mobile, Alabama; and Pensacola, Florida. However, the central and southern Florida peninsula and South Texas has a pronounced winter dry season, as at Tampa and Fort Myers. On the central and southern Texas coast, winter, early spring and mid-summer are markedly drier, and September is the wettest month on average at Corpus Christi and Brownsville, Texas. Tornadoes are infrequent at the coast but do occur; however, they occur more frequently in inland portions of Gulf Coast states. Over most of the Gulf Coast from Houston, Texas, eastward, extreme rainfall events are a significant threat, commonly from tropical weather systems, which can bring 4 to 10 or more inches of rain in a single day. In August 2017, Hurricane Harvey made landfall along the central Texas coast, then migrated to and stalled over the greater Houston area for several days, producing extreme, unprecedented rainfall totals of over 40 inches (1,000 mm) in many areas, unleashing widespread flooding. Climate scientists predict more hurricanes for Florida and the Texas coastline in particular. Earthquakes are extremely rare to the area, but a 6.0 earthquake in the Gulf of Mexico on September 10, 2006, could be felt from the cities of New Orleans to Tampa.

=== Rising sea levels ===
Due to the release of greenhouse gas emissions, glaciers and ice sheets are melting and expanding the oceans. The United States coastlines are projected to rise 1 foot in three decades or between 10 and 12 inches on average by 2050. The Gulf Coast will likely see the biggest change, with sea levels expected to rise between 14 and 18 inches. The Global and Regional Sea Level Rise Report predicted more frequent, major and destructive high tide flooding events along with taller storm surges by 2050 after scientists determined high tide flooding has been "increasingly common" over the past few years due to the rising sea levels. The impacts are expected to be dramatic. Low-lying coastal areas are expected to experience multiple factors, including increased levels of flooding, accelerated erosion, loss of wetlands and low-lying terrestrial ecosystems, and seawater intrusion into freshwater sources. Rising sea level and erosion will also imperil critical habitats for many commercially important fisheries that depend on inshore waters for either permanent residence or nursery area. In 2021 alone rising sea levels cost the United States approximately $2.6 billion in relief efforts and caused at least seven deaths. By 2051, the cost of flood damage is expected to increase by 61%, or $32 billion.

== Economic activities ==
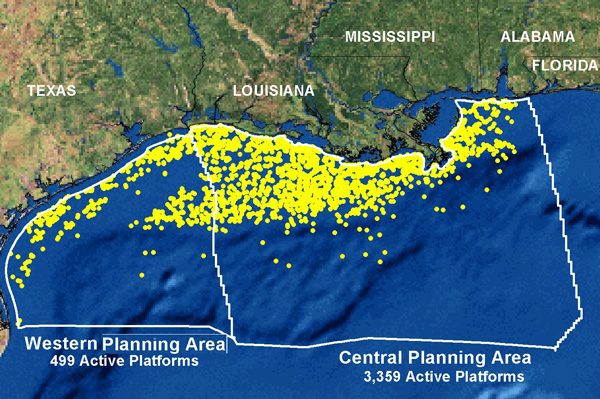
NOAA map of the 3,856 oil and gas platforms extant off the Gulf Coast in 2006

The Gulf Coast is a major center of economic activity. The marshlands along the Louisiana and Texas coasts provide breeding grounds and nurseries for ocean life that drive the fishing and shrimping industries. The Port of South Louisiana (Metropolitan New Orleans in Laplace) and the Port of Houston are two of the ten busiest ports in the world by cargo volume. As of 2004, seven of the top ten busiest ports in the U.S. are on the Gulf Coast.

The discovery of oil and gas deposits along the coast and offshore, combined with easy access to shipping, have made the Gulf Coast the heart of the U.S. petrochemical industry. The coast contains nearly 4,000 oil platforms.

Besides the above, the region features other important industries including aerospace and biomedical research, as well as older industries such as agriculture and—especially since the development of the Gulf Coast beginning in the 1920s and the increase in wealth throughout the United States—tourism.

== History ==
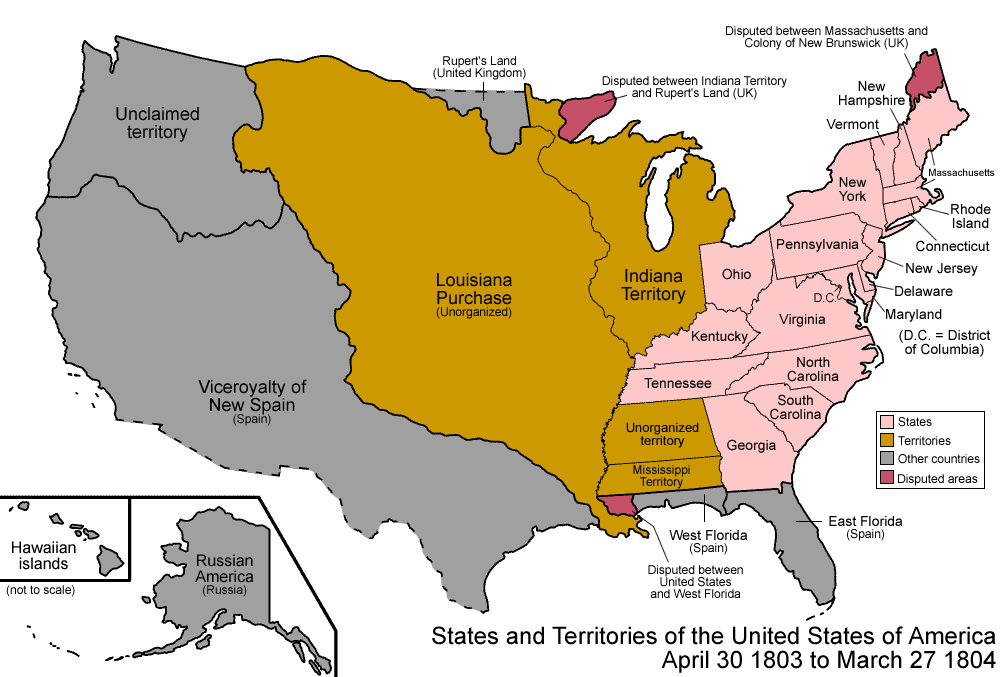
Map of the Louisiana Purchase

Hurricane Katrina and Hurricane Rita have destroyed a number of museums and archives in the Gulf Coast. In 2008 floods in Iowa destroyed the local Flood Museum which held materials from the Great Mississippi and Missouri Rivers Flood of 1993.

Before European settlers arrived in the region, the Gulf Coast was home to several pre-Columbian kingdoms which had extensive trade networks with empires such as the Aztecs and the Mississippi Mound Builders. Shark and alligator teeth and shells from the Gulf have been found as far north as Ohio, in the mounds of the Hopewell culture.

The first Europeans to settle the Gulf Coast were primarily the French and the Spanish. The Louisiana Purchase (1803), Adams–Onís Treaty (1819) and the Texas Revolution (1835–1836) made the Gulf Coast a part of the United States during the first half of the 19th century. As the U.S. population continued to expand its frontiers westward, the Gulf Coast was a natural magnet in the South providing access to shipping lanes and both national and international commerce. The development of sugar and cotton production (enabled by slavery) allowed the South to prosper. By the mid-19th century the city of New Orleans, being situated as a key to commerce on the Mississippi River and in the Gulf, had become the largest U.S. city not on the Atlantic seaboard and the fourth largest in the U.S. overall.

Two major events were turning points in the earlier history of the Gulf Coast region. The first was the American Civil War, which caused severe damage to some economic sectors in the South, including the Gulf Coast. The second event was the Galveston Hurricane of 1900. At the end of the 19th century Galveston was, with New Orleans, one of the most developed cities in the region. The city had the third busiest port in the U.S. and its financial district was known as the "Wall Street of the South".

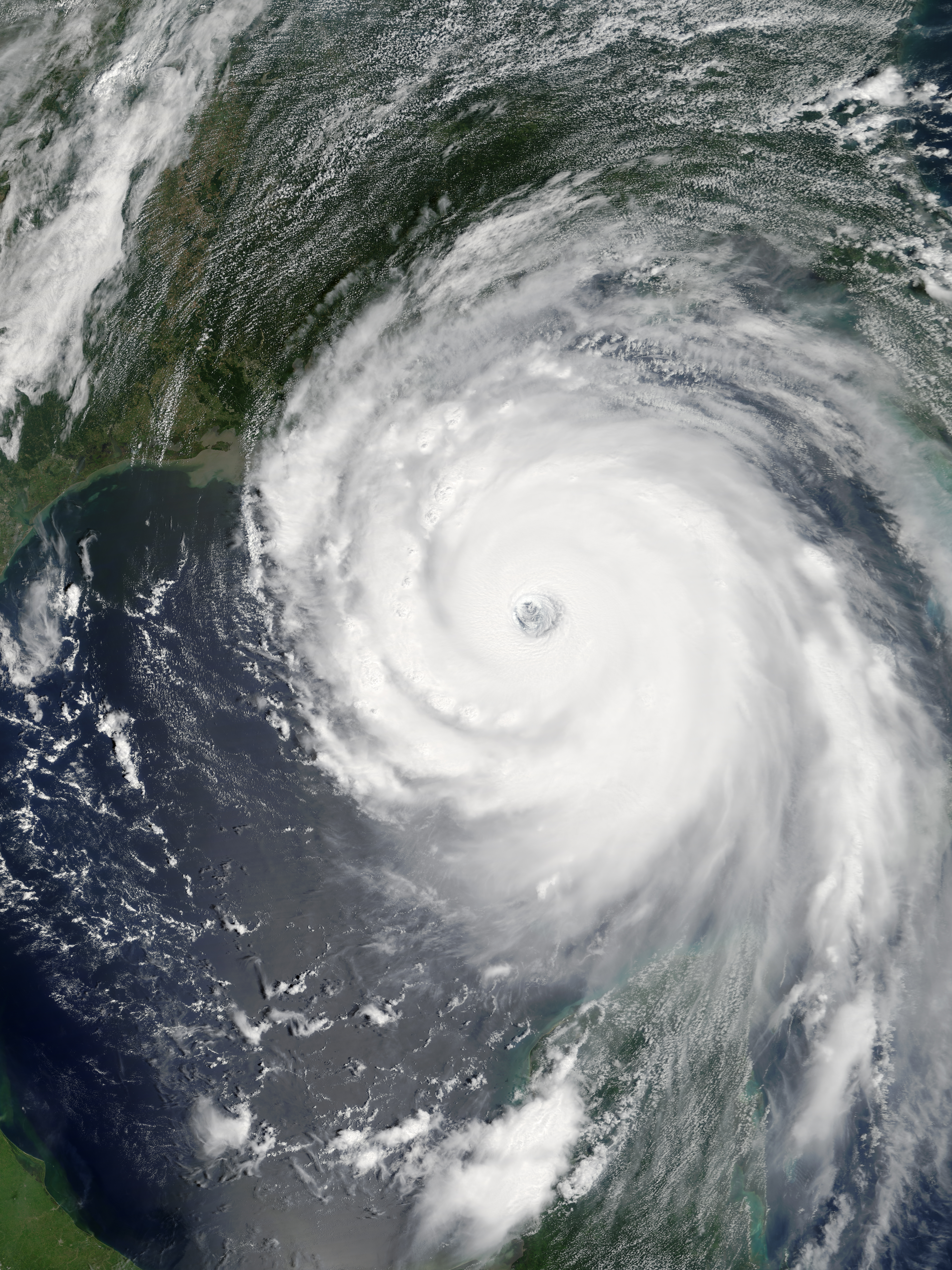
Hurricane Katrina

Since then the Gulf Coast has been hit with numerous other hurricanes. On August 29, 2005, Hurricane Katrina struck the Gulf Coast as a Category 3 hurricane. It was the most damaging storm in the history of the United States, causing upwards of $80 billion in damages, and leaving over 1,800 dead. Again in 2008, the Gulf Coast was struck by a catastrophic hurricane. Due to its immense size, Hurricane Ike caused devastation from the Louisiana coastline all the way to the Kenedy County, Texas, region near Corpus Christi. In addition, Ike caused flooding and significant damage along the Mississippi coastline and the Florida panhandle. Ike killed 112 people and left upwards of 300 people missing, never to be found. Hurricane Ike was the third most damaging storm in the history of the United States, causing more than $25 billion in damage along the coast, leaving hundreds of thousands of people homeless, and sparking the largest search-and-rescue operation in U.S. history.

Other than the hurricanes, the Gulf Coast has redeveloped dramatically over the course of the 20th century. The gulf coast is highly populated.

The petrochemical industry, launched with the major discoveries of oil in Texas and spurred on by further discoveries in the Gulf waters, has been a vehicle for development in the central and western Gulf which has spawned development on a variety of fronts in these regions. Texas in particular has benefited tremendously from this industry over the course of the 20th century and economic diversification has made the state a magnet for population and home to more Fortune 500 companies than any other U.S. state. Florida has grown as well, driven to a great extent by its long established tourism industry but also by its position as a gateway to the Caribbean and Latin America. As of 2024, Texas and Florida are the second and third most populous states in the nation, respectively. Other areas of the Gulf Coast have benefited less, though economic development fueled by tourism has greatly increased property values along the coast, and is now a severe danger to the valuable but fragile ecosystems of the Gulf Coast.

Since January 24, 2025, U.S. federal government agencies are required to refer to the Gulf of Mexico as the "Gulf of America".

== Metropolitan areas ==
The following table lists the 14 largest core-based statistical areas along the Gulf Coast.

Metropolitan statistical areas on the United States Gulf Coast
Rank	Metropolitan statistical area	2020 pop. (est.)
1	Houston-The Woodlands, TX Combined Statistical Area	7,340,823
2	Tampa-St. Petersburg-Clearwater, FL Metropolitan Statistical Area	3,243,963
3	New Orleans-Metairie-Hammond, LA-MS Combined Statistical Area	1,510,672
4	Cape Coral-Fort Myers-Naples, FL Combined Statistical Area	1,226,553
5	North Port-Sarasota, FL Combined Statistical Area	1,087,915
6	McAllen-Edinburg, TX Combined Statistical Area	939,466
7	Baton Rouge, LA Metropolitan Statistical Area	858,571
8	Mobile-Daphne-Fairhope, AL Combined Statistical Area	661,964
9	Lafayette-Opelousas-Morgan City, LA Combined Statistical Area	619,529
10	Pensacola-Ferry Pass, FL-AL Combined Statistical Area	547,784
11	Corpus Christi-Kingsville-Alice, TX Combined Statistical Area	536,258
12	Brownsville–Harlingen–Raymondville, TX Combined Statistical Area	441,181
13	Beaumont–Port Arthur-Orange, TX Metropolitan Area	397,565
14	Lake Charles–DeRidder, LA Combined Statistical Area	254,652

== Transportation ==
=== Road ===
==== Major Interstates ====
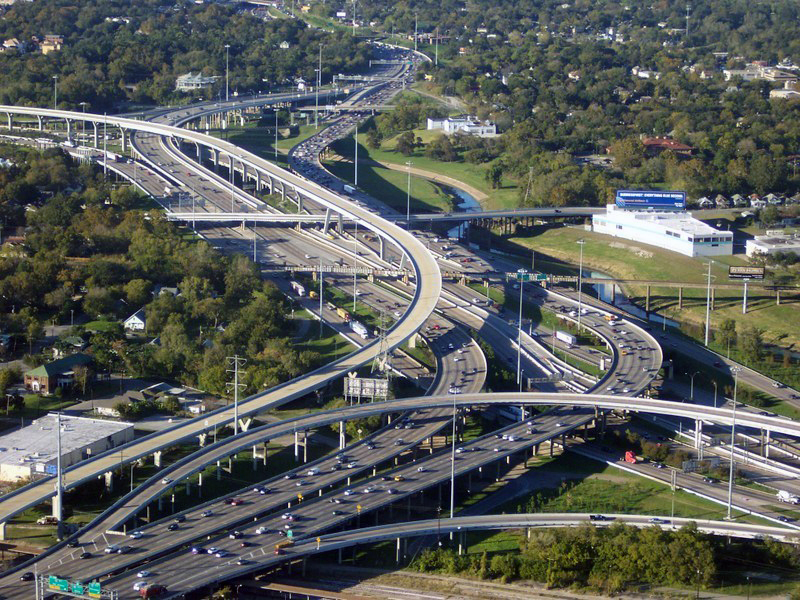
I-45 and I-10/U.S. 90 near Downtown Houston

Highway	Significant cities served
Interstate 2	Harlingen, McAllen
Interstate 4	Tampa
Interstate 10	Houston, Baytown, Beaumont, Lake Charles, Lafayette, Baton Rouge, New Orleans, Slidell, Gulfport, Biloxi, Mobile, Pensacola
Interstate 12	Baton Rouge, Hammond, Slidell
Interstate 37	Corpus Christi
Interstate 45	Galveston, Houston
Interstate 49	New Orleans (future), Houma (future), Thibodaux (future), Lafayette
Interstate 55	Hammond
Interstate 59	Slidell
Interstate 65	Mobile
Interstate 69	Victoria (future), Houston
Interstate 69E	Brownsville, Harlingen, Corpus Christi, Victoria (future)
Interstate 69W	Victoria (future)
Interstate 75	Naples, Fort Myers, North Port, Sarasota, Bradenton, St. Petersburg, Tampa

==== Major U.S. routes ====
Highway	Significant cities served
U.S. 11	New Orleans
U.S. 17	Punta Gorda
U.S. 19	St. Petersburg, Tampa
U.S. 29	Pensacola
U.S. 31	Spanish Fort
U.S. 41	Naples, Fort Myers, Sarasota, Bradenton, St. Petersburg, Tampa
U.S. 43	Mobile
U.S. 45	Mobile
U.S. 49	Biloxi, Gulfport
U.S. 51	Hammond
U.S. 59	Houston, Victoria
U.S. 61	New Orleans
U.S. 69	Beaumont, Port Arthur
U.S. 77	Brownsville, Corpus Christi, Harlingen, Victoria
U.S. 83	Brownsville, Harlingen
U.S. 87	Port Lavaca, Victoria
U.S. 90	Beaumont, Biloxi, Crestview, Houma, Houston, Lafayette, Lake Charles, Mobile, New Orleans, Pascagoula, Pensacola, Thibodaux
U.S. 92	St. Petersburg, Tampa
U.S. 96	Beaumont, Port Arthur
U.S. 98	Fort Walton Beach, Mobile, Pensacola, Panama City

==== Other significant routes ====
Highway	Significant cities served
LA 1	Grand Isle, Port Fourchon, Thibodaux
S.R. 85	Crestview, Fort Walton Beach
S.H. 35	Houston, Bay City, Port Lavaca, Rockport, Corpus Christi
S.H. 288	

=== Air ===
==== International service ====
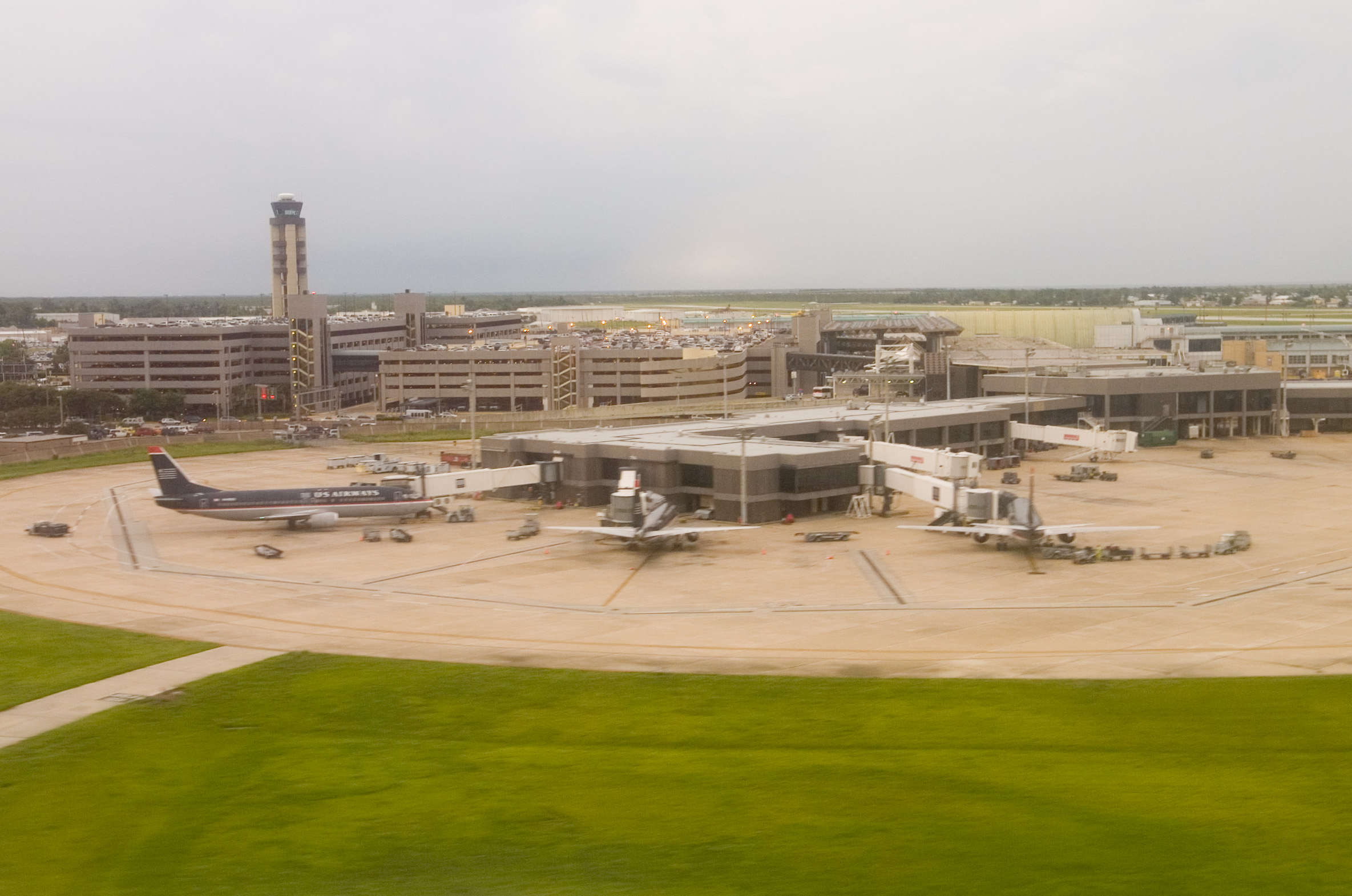
Louis Armstrong New Orleans International Airport

International destinations

George Bush Intercontinental Airport - Houston	Argentina, (The Bahamas) Bahamas, Belize, Bonaire, Brazil, Canada, Cayman Islands, Chile, China, Colombia, Costa Rica, Dominican Republic, Ecuador, El Salvador, France, Germany, Guatemala, Honduras, Jamaica, Japan, Mexico, Netherlands, New Zealand, Nicaragua, Nigeria, Norway, Panama, Peru, Qatar, Russia, Singapore, Trinidad and Tobago,Turkey, Turks and Caicos Islands, (United Arab Emirates) UAE, United Kingdom, Venezuela
Louis Armstrong New Orleans International Airport	Canada, Honduras, Mexico, United Kingdom
Southwest Florida International Airport	Canada, Germany
Tampa International Airport	(The Bahamas) Bahamas, Canada, Cayman Islands, Cuba, Dominican Republic, Germany, Iceland, Jamaica, Mexico, Panama, Switzerland, United Kingdom
William P. Hobby Airport - Houston	Aruba, Belize, Cayman Islands, Costa Rica, Dominican Republic, Jamaica, Mexico

=== Rail ===
==== Amtrak service ====
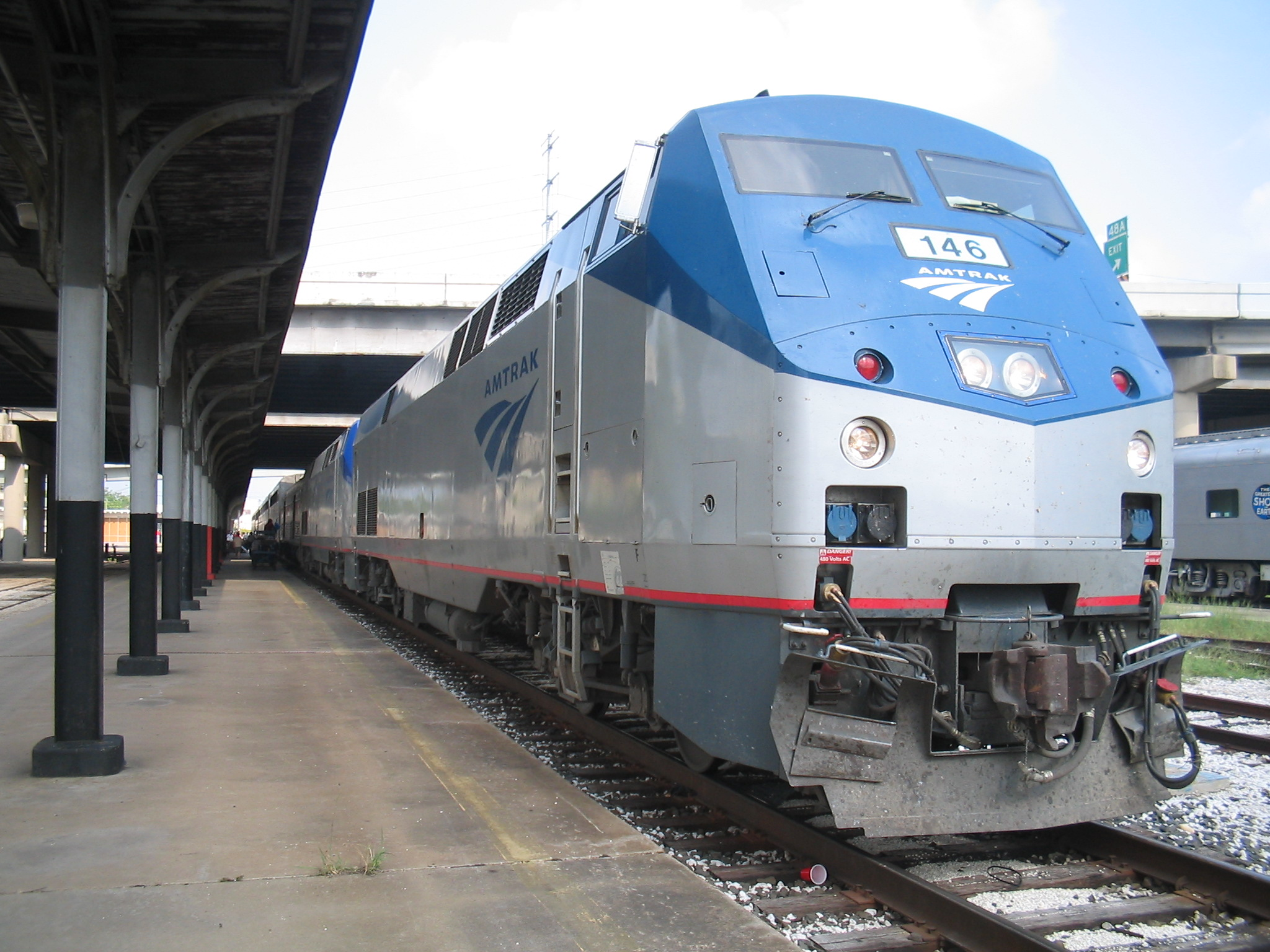
Sunset Limited at Houston

Train	Route	Gulf Coast cities served
City of New Orleans	Chicago to New Orleans	New Orleans
Crescent	New York City to New Orleans	New Orleans, Picayune, MS, Slidell, LA|-
Mardi Gras Service	New Orleans to Mobile	New Orleans, LA, Bay St. Louis, MS, Gulfport, MS, Gulfport, MS, Biloxi, MS, Pascagoula, MS, Mobile
Silver Star	New York City to Miami	Tampa, with connection available to Amtrak Thruway to Clearwater, FL, Bradenton, FL, Sarasota, FL, Port Charlotte, FL and Fort Myers, FL
Sunset Limited	Los Angeles to Orlando (temporarily New Orleans)	Bay St. Louis, MS, Beaumont, TX, Biloxi, Crestview, FL, Gulfport, MS, Houston, Lafayette, LA, Lake Charles, LA, Baton Rouge, LA, Mobile, New Orleans, Panama City, FL, Scriever, LA, Pascagoula, MS, Pensacola, FL

== See also ==
- East Coast of the United States
- West Coast of the United States
- Emerald Coast
- Florida Panhandle
- Geography of the United States
- Gulf Coast Ecosystem Restoration Task Force
- Gulf States Marine Fisheries Commission
- Offshore oil and gas in the Gulf
- Megaregions of the United States
- Mississippi Gulf Coast
- New Orleans
- West Florida
- Gulf Coast of Mexico
