= Ocean Springs station =

Train station in Ocean Springs, Mississippi, U.S.

Ocean Springs

General information
- Location: Ocean Springs, MS 39564; United States
- Coordinates: 30.415445°N 88.827745°W
- Line: NO&M Subdivision
- Platforms: 1 side platform

History
- Opened: November 7, 2026 (temporary)
- Closed: November 8, 2026

Passengers
- Nov. 7-8, 2026: 175

Services
Preceding station	Amtrak	Following station
Biloxi toward New Orleans	Mardi Gras Service	Pascagoula toward Mobile
Location

Ocean Springs is a temporary Amtrak station that was opened for the Peter Anderson Arts and Crafts Festival.

== History ==
As early as 2021, while Amtrak was still planning on returning train service to Mobile (what would become the Mardi Gras Service), city officials in Ocean Springs were already calling for the creation of an Amtrak station there. The then-proposed Amtrak service would pass through the city, although a station there wasn't originally planned.

In October 2026, it was announced that Amtrak would serve a temporary station in Ocean Springs, during the 48th annual Peter Anderson Arts & Crafts Festival. This station would be located right next to the festival entrance, and would be open on both days of the festival.

On November 1, a local bakery was planning on handing out 150 king cake bites to passengers at the station.

The temporary station was opened on November 7, and remained open alongside the festival until November 8. This station was the first time since 1965 that Ocean Springs had any passenger rail service. Knox Ross, the chairman of the Southern Rail Commission, considered the station a success. Meanwhile, Bobby Cox, the mayor of Ocean Springs, said that he is calling for the station to be opened again for other special events:

Next year, I’ll guarantee you there will be a lot more getting off that train, and we’re gonna ask for maybe some more stops

— Bobby Cox
