= Decatur station (Southern Railway) =

Railway station in Decatur, Alabama

Decatur, AL
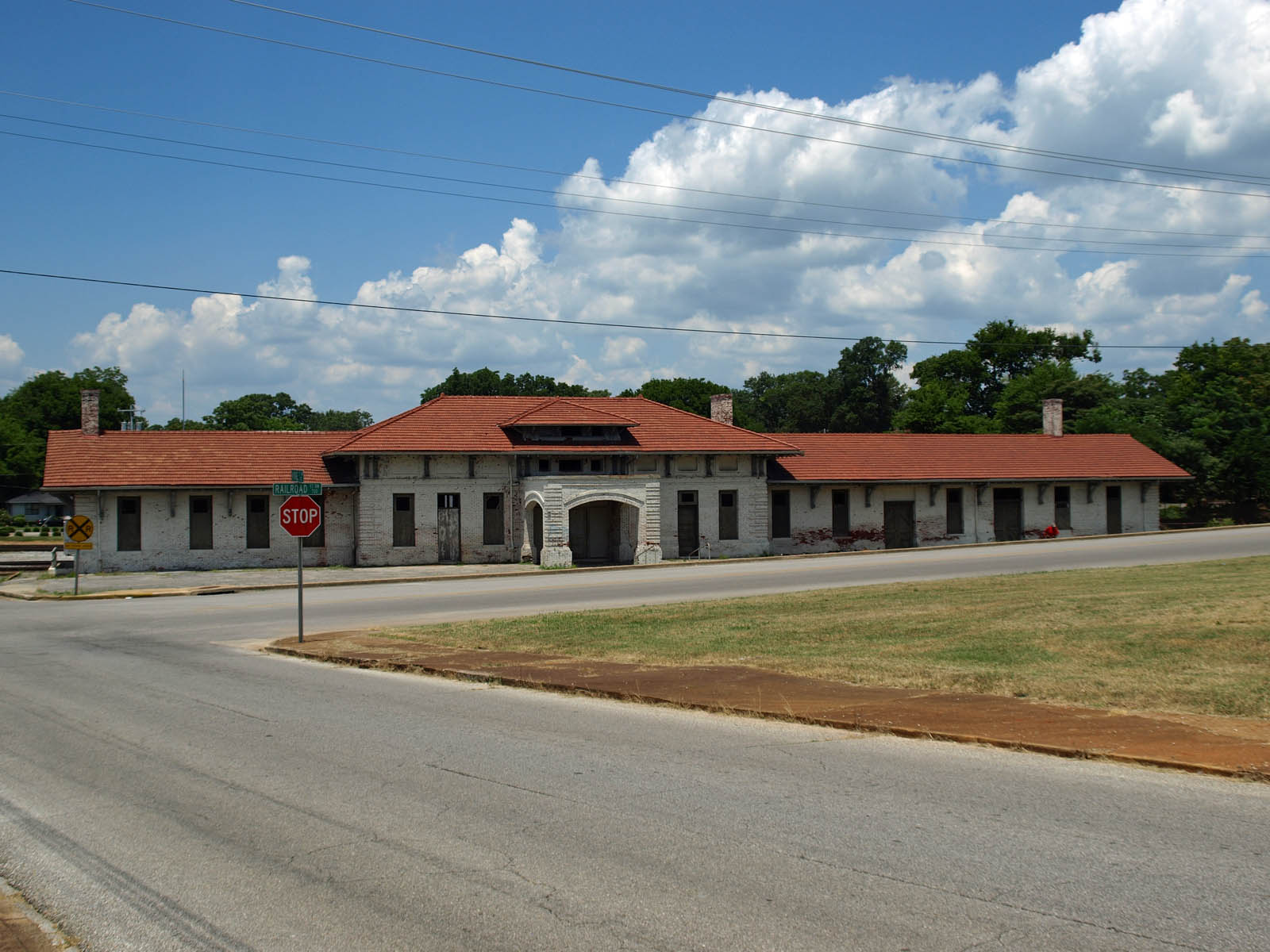
- The depot in July 2010

General information
- Location: 701 Railroad St., NW, Decatur, Alabama; USA
- System: inter-city rail station

History
- Opened: 1905
- Closed: 1979

Former services
Preceding station	Amtrak	Following station
Birmingham toward St. Petersburg or Miami	Floridian	Nashville toward Chicago
Preceding station	Southern Railway	Following station
Trinity toward Memphis	Memphis – Bristol	Belle Mina toward Bristol
Preceding station	Louisville and Nashville Railroad	Following station
Grant Street toward New Orleans	Main Line	Athens toward Cincinnati
- Southern Railway Depot
- U.S. National Register of Historic Places
- Location within Alabama Location within the United States
- Location: 701 Railroad St., NW, Decatur, Alabama
- Coordinates: 34°36′49″N 86°59′12″W
- Area: 0.5 acres (0.20 ha)
- Built: 1905
- Architect: Milburn, Frank
- NRHP reference No.: 80004470
- Added to NRHP: March 10, 1980
Location

Decatur station is a former train station in Decatur, Alabama. The depot was built in 1904–05 along the Southern Railway line. Decatur had become a transportation hub of North Alabama by the 1870s, with its connections to the Tennessee River, the east–west Tuscumbia, Courtland and Decatur Railroad (later operated by the Memphis and Charleston Railroad and the Southern Railway), and the north–south Louisville and Nashville Railroad.

The Southern's last train through the city was the Tennessean (Memphis-Washington, D.C., discontinued, 1968). The last train by the L&N, and the train with the last route going south toward Alabama's largest cities, was the Pan-American, (Cincinnati-New Orleans) which ended in 1971. Other L&N trains passing through were the Azalean (Cincinnati-New Orleans) and the Humming Bird (Cincinnati-New Orleans). The depot last functioned as a passenger station in 1979, when Amtrak cancelled its (Chicago-St. Petersburg / Miami) Floridian service.

The station is built of brick painted white, with quoins on the corners. The building has a rectangular central section with narrower wings stretching along the tracks. The central section has a hipped roof, while the wings have gable roofs; both have deep eaves with decorative brackets. The main entrance is covered by a porte-cochère with arched openings. The depot was listed on the National Register of Historic Places in 1980.
