= Mardi Gras Service =

Amtrak train between New Orleans and Mobile

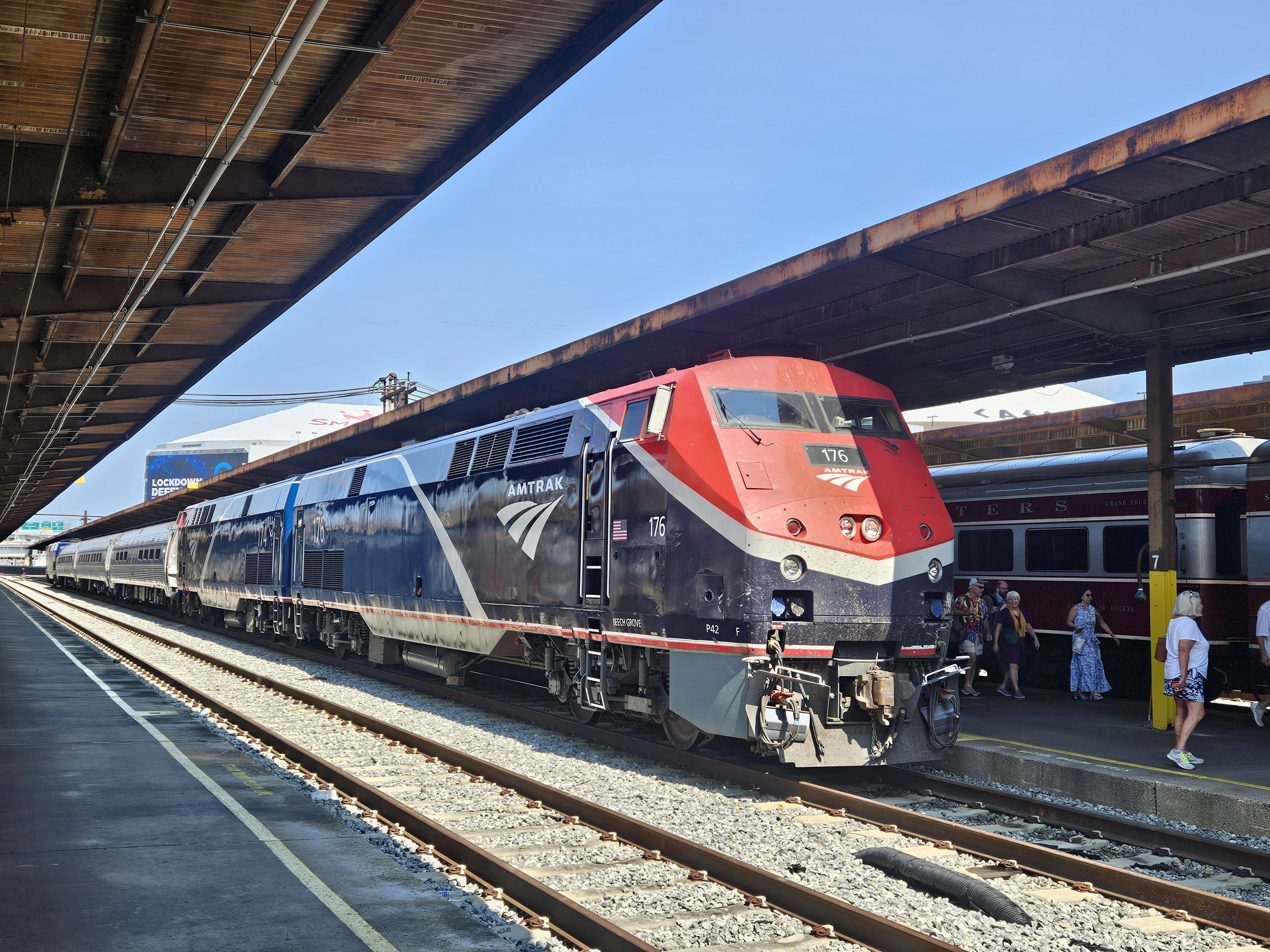
- The Mardi Gras Service at New Orleans in August 2025

Overview
- Service type: Inter-city rail
- Locale: United States Gulf Coast
- Predecessor: Gulf Coast Limited
- First service: August 18, 2025
- Current operator: Amtrak
- Annual ridership: 18,906 (FY 25) (Note: Route started August 2025.) (Note: Amtrak's Fiscal Year (FY) runs from October 1 of the prior year to September 30 of the named year.)

Route
- Termini: New Orleans, Louisiana; Mobile, Alabama
- Stops: 6
- Distance travelled: 145 miles (233 km)
- Average journey time: 3 hours, 43 minutes
- Service frequency: Twice daily
- Train numbers: 23, 25 (westbound); 24, 26 (eastbound)

On-board services
- Classes: Coach Class; Business Class
- Disabled access: All cars, all stations
- Catering facilities: Café
- Baggage facilities: Overhead racks

Technical
- Track gauge: 4 ft 8 1/2 in (1,435 mm)
- Operating speed: 39 mph (63 km/h) (avg.); 79 mph (127 km/h) (top)
- Track owner: CSX Transportation

The Mardi Gras Service is a passenger train service operated by Amtrak along the Gulf Coast of the United States. The service consists of two daily round trips between New Orleans, Louisiana, and Mobile, Alabama, with stops in Bay St. Louis, Gulfport, Biloxi, and Pascagoula, Mississippi. Service began on August 18, 2025.

The Mardi Gras Service follows the same route as the Gulf Coast Limited, a daily train operated by Amtrak in 1984–1985, and again in 1996–1997. The corridor was also served by the long-distance Sunset Limited from 1993 to 2005.

== Route ==
The Mardi Gras Service operates over a 145-mile (233 km) route from New Orleans to Mobile, hugging the coast of the Gulf of Mexico. The majority of this route is owned by CSX Transportation (NO&M Subdivision), save a few miles around the New Orleans Union Passenger Terminal and East City Junction, which are owned by Amtrak and the Norfolk Southern Railway, respectively. Both iterations of the Gulf Coast Limited operated over the same route as the Mardi Gras Service does today.

Amtrak offers bus service (via Greyhound / FlixBus) from Baton Rouge to New Orleans, connecting with the Mardi Gras Service.

== History ==
Amtrak operated the Gulf Coast Limited along the Gulf Coast, halting in 1997 due to state funding issues. It also operated the Sunset Limited along the Gulf Coast until Hurricane Katrina in August 2005. The hurricane destroyed major bridges and damaged 110 miles of track along Gulf Coast section of the route. Freight rail was restored five months after the hurricane, however, a lack of funding and opposition from freight rail companies prevented a restoration of passenger rail.

The Rail Passengers Association began lobbying for the route's return in 2010. The Southern Rail Commission began working on a proposal to restore service in 2014. In July 2017, the Gulf Coast Working Group of the Federal Railroad Administration (FRA) submitted a report to Congress recommending restoration of service on the New Orleans–Mobile corridor.

In June 2019, the FRA announced a grant award of $33 million to restore Amtrak service between New Orleans and Mobile, and to upgrade tracks, stations, and other facilities to support improved passenger rail service. The grant was matched by funds from Louisiana, Mississippi, and the City of Mobile. Officials announced plans for up to four daytime rail trips per day within 24 months, serving the cities of New Orleans, Bay St. Louis, Gulfport, Biloxi, and Pascagoula. Having received a commitment of support from Mobile, if the state of Alabama participates, service could be extended to downtown Mobile.

On February 23, 2021, following the conclusion of one year of negotiations with CSX and Norfolk Southern, Amtrak officials announced that Gulf Coast Service between New Orleans and Mobile would start as early as January 2022. Amtrak plans to pay for repairs along the route. The Infrastructure Investment and Jobs Act, passed on November 15, 2021, provided federal funding for the route. By late 2022, after lengthy negotiations with Norfolk Southern and CSX, Amtrak expected Gulf Coast service to begin sometime in 2024.

In its annual report published in March 2023, Amtrak referred to the new service simply as the Gulf Coast and reiterated that two round trips would begin in fiscal year 2023. In June 2023, Amtrak began running test trains along the corridor and continued to make preparations for the service to begin. In early August 2023, it was reported that an agreement between Amtrak, CSX, and the city of Mobile on the design and construction of the station there had not yet been reached, and that the service was now not expected to start until the first quarter of 2024. In late August the name of the train was reported to be Mardi Gras Service. The following month, Amtrak received nearly $200 million in federal grants. They announced that up to just over $178 million of that money would be used in the Gulf Coast Corridor Improvement Project that will allow Mardi Gras Service to start.

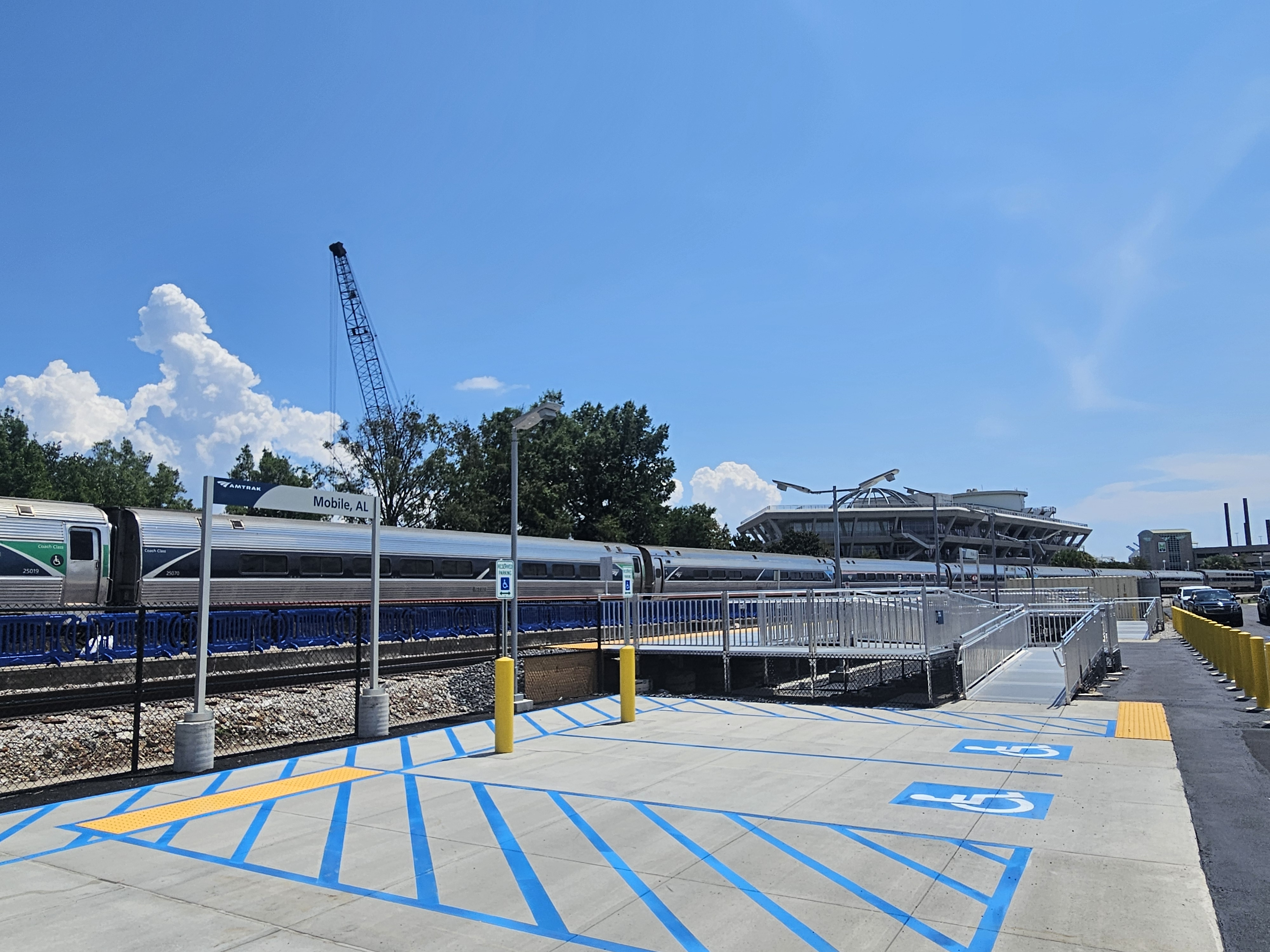
The inaugural special train at Mobile

In December 2023, the Federal Railroad Administration accepted an application by the Southern Rail Commission to enter the New Orleans–Mobile route into its Corridor Identification and Development Program. The program grants $500,000 toward service planning and prioritizes the route for future federal funding.

In January 2024, the Surface Transportation Board (STB) called for “detailed information” on the status of the agreement that first agreed upon in November 2022 between all the parties involved in the new Amtrak Gulf Coast service. A hearing was scheduled for February 14, but the parties asked for the hearing and the case to be scrapped when they sent their update on February 1. Their filing indicated that the delay in the start of service was due to ongoing negotiations between Amtrak and the City of Mobile. The final agreement between Amtrak and the City of Mobile was approved by the Mobile City Council on August 6, 2024, with service planned to start in June 2025. In January 2025, the Federal Railroad Administration awarded $21.1 million to cover operating costs for the service. On May 29, 2025, the Southern Rail Commission announced that service was postponed to late July or early August, due to construction issues.

On July 1, 2025, Amtrak announced that Mardi Gras Service would begin on August 18, 2025, with two daily return trips. Tickets on the inaugural trains sold out within a day. A special inaugural trip was run on August 16, 2025, two days before regular service began. Mardi Gras parades were held at stations on the route. In mid-September, Amtrak began adding a fourth car to some trains that were selling out due to New Orleans Saints home football games. In December, Amtrak reported that the service had drawn 46,000 riders since its launch, putting it on track to double the service's projected 12-month ridership of 71,000. By April 2026, ridership exceeded 100,000. In November 2026, a stop in Ocean Springs, Mississippi was temporarily added to serve the annual Peter Anderson Festival.

== Stations ==
State	Municipality	Station	Connections
Alabama	Mobile	Mobile	The Wave Transit System
Mississippi	Pascagoula	Pascagoula	
Mississippi	Biloxi	Biloxi	Coast Transit Authority; Greyhound
Mississippi	Gulfport	Gulfport	Coast Transit Authority
Mississippi	Bay St. Louis	Bay St. Louis	
Louisiana	New Orleans	New Orleans Union Passenger Terminal	Amtrak: City of New Orleans, Crescent, Sunset Limited; RTA Streetcar: 46 Rampart/Loyola; RTA Bus; Greyhound

== See also ==
- Gulf Breeze
- Gulf Coast Limited
- New Orleans–Baton Rouge passenger rail
