= L&N Station =

L&N Station may refer to:

- L&N Station (Knoxville)
- L&N Station (New Orleans)
