= Pine series (railcar) =

Class of 29 Pullman 6–6-4 sleeping cars

Pine series 6-4-6 sleeping car
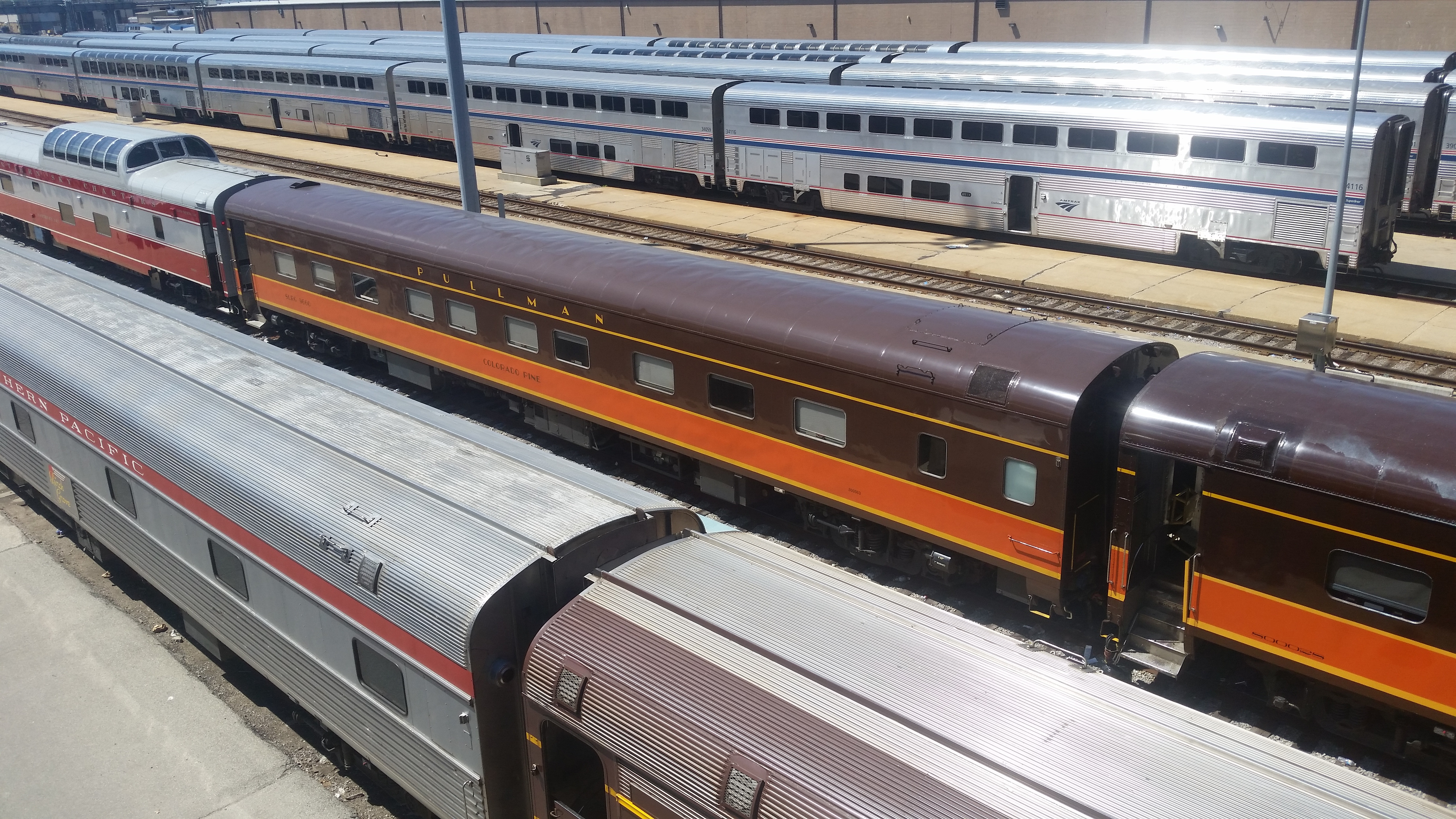
- Iowa Pacific's Colorado Pine, originally built for the L&N in 1951, at Chicago in 2015
- In service: 1953–1971
- Manufacturer: Pullman-Standard
- Order no.: Lot 6909
- Constructed: 1953
- Number built: 29
- Diagram: Pullman Plan 4183
- Capacity: 26
- Operators: Pullman Company; Chicago and Eastern Illinois Railroad; Louisville and Nashville Railroad; Nashville, Chattanooga and St. Louis Railway

Specifications
- Car length: 85 feet (26 m)
- Track gauge: 4 ft 8 1/2 in (1,435 mm)

The Pine series was a fleet of sleeping cars built by Pullman-Standard in 1953. The cars were built according to Pullman plan 4183; each contained six sections, six roomettes and four double bedrooms (colloquially "6-6-4"). The cars were originally owned by the Louisville and Nashville Railroad (L&N), the Chicago and Eastern Illinois Railroad (C&EI), and the Nashville, Chattanooga and St. Louis Railway (NC&StL).

== Design ==
Pullman-Standard surveyed over 2,000 passengers during the design phase of the Pine series, and based on their suggestions implemented several improvements to the exterior and interior design. The new cars rode more smoothly than their predecessors. On the inside, Pullman incorporated postwar improvements such as air-conditioning, fluorescent lighting, and sponge-rubber seats. A major improvement over the pre-war American series 6-6-4 sleeping car was the rearrangement of the accommodation: in the American series the premium-priced double bedrooms were at the vestibule end of the car over one of the trucks, the roomettes were in the middle, and the sections were at the blind (non-vestibule) end over the other truck; in the Pine series, the bedrooms were moved to the center of the car where the smoothest ride was. Consequently, the Pine series are sometimes referred to as "6-4-6" cars.

== History ==
The Louisville and Nashville Railroad (L&N) ordered 22 of the cars in 1951, primarily to replace the pre-World War II heavyweight cars on the Pan American, Humming Bird, and Georgian. Each car cost $163,000. Additional orders were placed by the Chicago and Eastern Illinois Railroad (C&EI) (four cars) and Nashville, Chattanooga and St. Louis Railway (NC&StL) (three cars). Both railroads interoperated with the L&N. Each of the sleeping cars had a name ending in Pine such as Georgia Pine or Whispering Pine, reflecting the road's Southern heritage. The cars began entering service in 1953, and also saw service on such trains as the Gulf Wind, Flamingo, and Azalean.

The NC&StL's three cars became part of the L&N's fleet in August 1957 on the merger of the two railroads. All of the cars were retired in 1971 on the formation of Amtrak and the end of passenger service on the L&N. Several later saw service on the original Auto-Train.

== Original owners ==
All 29 cars were part of Pullman Lot 6909:

Railroad	Number	Road numbers	Notes
Chicago and Eastern Illinois Railroad	4	900–903	named Slash Pine, Pitch Pine, Loblolly Pine, Pond Pine respectively
Louisville and Nashville Railroad	22	3450–3471	named Alabama Pine, Curly Pine, Deep Woods Pine, Green Pine, Holiday Pine, Kentucky Pine, Light Pine, Lonesome Pine, Long Leaf Pine, Louisiana Pine, Mississippi Pine, Mountain Pine, Plantation Pine, Rock Creek Pine, Short Leaf Pine, Southern Pine, Tall Pine, Towering Pine, Whispering Pine, White Pine, Wild Pine, Yellow Pine respectively
Nashville, Chattanooga and St. Louis Railway	3	200–202	named Chickamauga Pine, Georgia Pine, Tennessee Pine respectively. Renumbered 3472–3474 on the L&N merger in 1957

== Preservation ==
Several Pine series sleeping cars are known to exist, including at least one in operating condition:

- Chickamauga Pine, ex-NC&StL #200, is at the Tennessee Valley Railroad Museum.
- Colorado Pine, ex-L&N #3462 Plantation Pine, is owned by Iowa Pacific Holdings.
- Short Leaf Pine, ex-L&N #3464, is under restoration at the Florida Railroad Museum.
- Towering Pine, ex-L&N #3467, is on display at The Historic Railpark and Train Museum in Bowling Green, Kentucky.
