= M&M Subdivision =

Railway line in Alabama

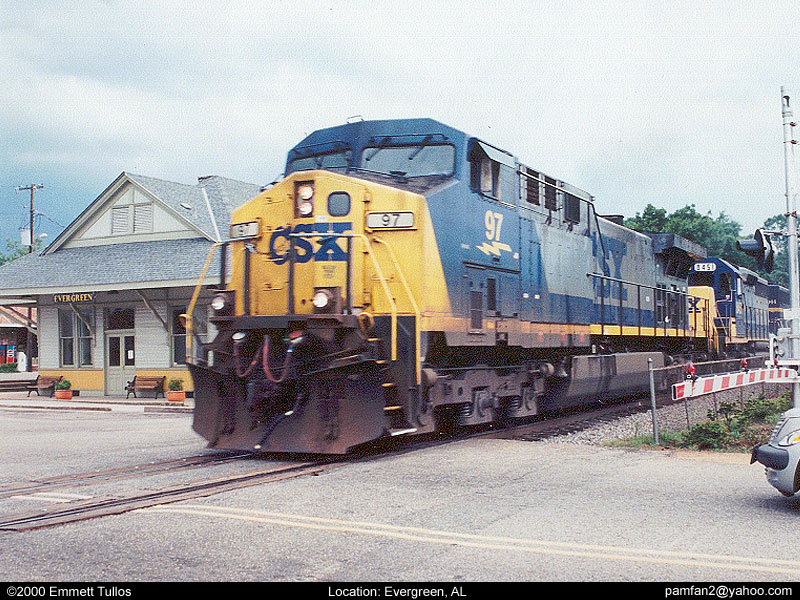
A CSX locomotive passes by the historic L&N Depot on the M&M Subdivision in Evergreen, Alabama.

The M&M Subdivision is a railroad line owned by CSX Transportation in Alabama. The line runs from Montgomery, Alabama, to Mobile, Alabama, for a total of 178.2 miles (286.8 km). At its north end it continues south from the S&NA South Subdivision and at its south end it continues south as the NO&M Subdivision. There is also the Prattville Branch which runs from Montgomery, Alabama, to Prattville, Alabama, for a total of 12 miles (19 km). The name M&M stands for the Mobile and Montgomery Railroad, which the line was part of in its history.

== History ==
The first efforts to build the line that is now the M&M Subdivision began in 1836 when the Alabama and Florida Railroad received a land grant from the federal government for a rail line between Mobile and Montgomery, Alabama. Though, construction would not begin on the line until 1850. In 1868, the Alabama and Florida Railroad merged with the Mobile & Great Northern Railroad Company becoming the Mobile and Montgomery Railroad. The Mobile and Montgomery Railroad would be absorbed by the Louisville and Nashville Railroad in 1880. The Louisville and Nashville Railroad was absorbed by the Seaboard Coast Line Railroad in 1982, which became CSX Transportation in 1986.

=== Big Bayou Canot accident ===
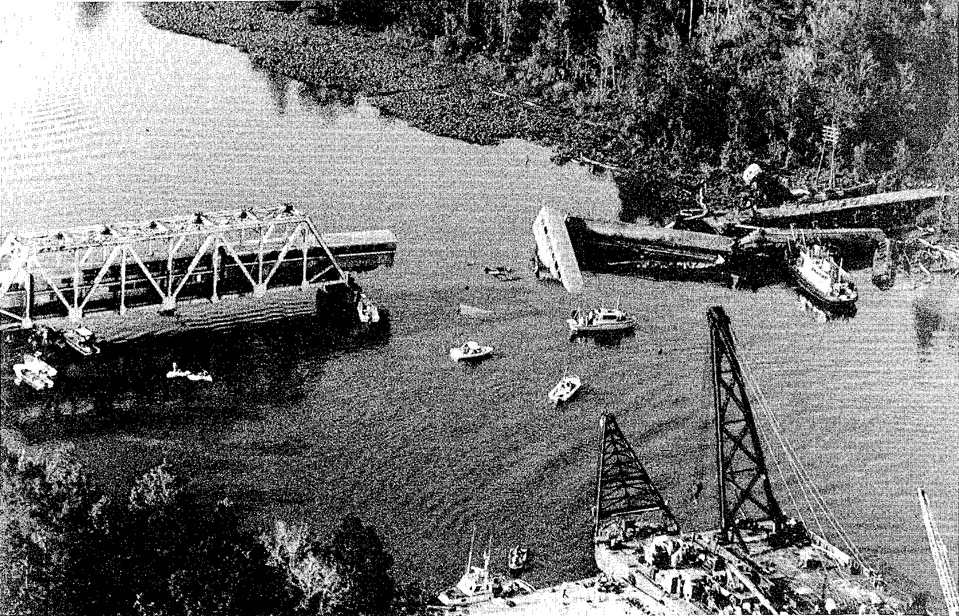
Sunset Limited wreck at Big Bayout Canot

The M&M Subdivision was the site of the deadliest crash in Amtrak's history. On September 22, 1993 at 2:45 a.m., a barge lightly struck the line's bridge over Big Bayou Canot near Mobile. The bridge had been designed as a swing bridge, but the center span was never operational and was not fully secured from movement when it was built. The impact displaced the span, putting the rails out of alignment. Amtrak's Sunset Limited crossed the bridge at full speed eight minutes later and fell into the bayou, killing 47 people.

== See also ==
- List of CSX Transportation lines
