= Gulf Coast Limited =

Amtrak train between New Orleans and Mobile

Overview
- Service type: Inter-city rail
- Status: Discontinued
- Locale: United States Gulf Coast
- Predecessor: Gulf Wind
- First service: April 29, 1984; June 27, 1996
- Last service: January 6, 1985; March 31, 1997
- Successor: Sunset Limited, Mardi Gras Service
- Former operator: Amtrak

Route
- Termini: New Orleans, Louisiana; Mobile, Alabama
- Stops: 5 (1984–1985); 4 (1996–1997)
- Distance travelled: 145 miles (233 km)
- Average journey time: 3 hours 40 minutes (1984–1985); 3 hours 10 minutes (1996–1997)
- Service frequency: Daily
- Train number: 23, 24

On-board services
- Class: Unreserved coach
- Catering facilities: Cafe lounge

Technical
- Track gauge: 4 ft 8 1/2 in (1,435 mm)
- Track owners: Seaboard System Railroad (1984–1985); CSX Transportation (1996–1997)

The Gulf Coast Limited was a passenger train service operated by Amtrak along the Gulf Coast of the United States. It ran daily between New Orleans, Louisiana, and Mobile, Alabama, with stops in Bay St. Louis, Gulfport, Biloxi, and Pascagoula, Mississippi. The route first operated in 1984–1985, and again in 1996–1997.

Amtrak's Mardi Gras Service, introduced on August 18, 2025, serves the former route of the Gulf Coast Limited, with two daily round trips.

== Route ==
The Gulf Coast Limited operated over a 145-mile (233 km) route from New Orleans to Mobile, hugging the coast of the Gulf of Mexico. The majority of this route is now owned by CSX Transportation (NO&M Subdivision), save a few miles around the New Orleans Union Passenger Terminal and East City Junction, which are owned by Amtrak and the Norfolk Southern Railway, respectively.

== History ==
Up to the latter 1960s, the New Orleans–Mobile route was served by several passenger trains a day. The Louisville & Nashville operated the daily trains, Gulf Wind (New Orleans–Jacksonville), Pan-American (New Orleans–Cincinnati) and Humming Bird (New Orleans–Cincinnati), as well as another unnamed day train (New Orleans–Jacksonville). In conjucntion with the Southern Railway, the L&N also operated the Crescent and the Piedmont Limited (both New Orleans–New York trains) on the route.

The Gulf Coast Limited was also the name of a train operated in the 1920s by the Atlantic Coast Line Railroad between New York and the west coast of Florida.

=== First iteration (1984–1985) ===
The Gulf Coast Limited grew out of a feasibility study conducted by the Louisiana-Mississippi-Alabama Rapid Rail Transit Commission in the early 1980s. The study sought a commuter rail service centered on New Orleans linking Baton Rouge, Louisiana; Slidell, Louisiana; or Mobile, Alabama. In the end the Commission opted for a New Orleans—Mobile service, prompted in part by the 1984 Louisiana World Exposition. The three states entered into a 403(b) arrangement with Amtrak; under this provision Amtrak undertakes to operate a service but the contracting states subsidize most of the cost. The first train ran on April 29, 1984.

In the fall Amtrak explored extending the Gulf Coast Limited from Mobile to Birmingham, Alabama (a route later served by the Gulf Breeze), but did not alter the train's route. The train was popular, but service ended on January 6, 1985, after Mississippi declined to continue its support.

=== Second iteration (1996–1997) ===
In 1993, Amtrak extended the long-distance Sunset Limited from New Orleans to Florida, consequently restoring service along the New Orleans–Mobile corridor.

Amtrak revived the Gulf Coast Limited on June 27, 1996, following the cancellation of the Gulf Breeze. The states of Alabama, Louisiana, and Mississippi each contributed $185,000 for a 90-day trial run. Amtrak estimated that yearly operation would cost $3.1 million. The train used the same route as its 1984 iteration, though without a stop in East New Orleans.

Initial ridership was higher than expected: a standard consist could seat 134, but weekend trains regularly carried 300, versus 50–60 on weekdays. A federal appropriation allowed Amtrak to extend the Gulf Coast Limited six months beyond the trial period, but additional state money was not forthcoming. Service ended March 31, 1997.

The concurrent Gulf Coast Limited and Sunset Limited resulted in ten weekly round trips between New Orleans and Mobile: the corridor's highest service level since the formation of Amtrak and a record unmatched since 1997.

In 2005, the Sunset Limited was indefinitely suspended east of New Orleans due to Hurricane Katrina, ending all service on the former route of the Gulf Coast Limited until service between New Orleans and Mobile was restored in the form of the Mardi Gras Service on August 18, 2025.

== See also ==
- Gulf Breeze
- New Orleans–Baton Rouge passenger rail
