= Mobile station (Amtrak) =

Railway station in Mobile, Alabama, US

Mobile, AL
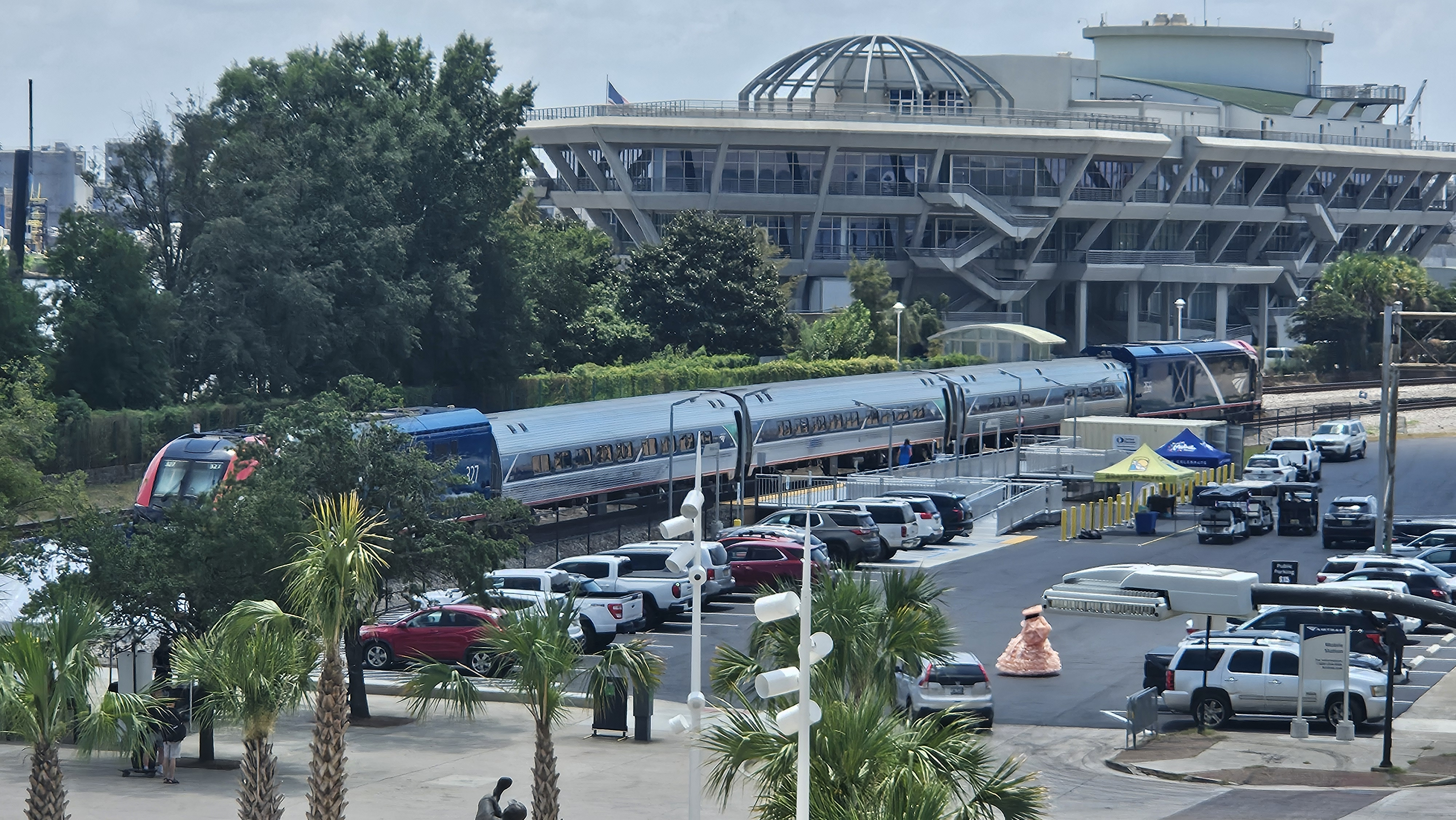
- The station in August 2025

General information
- Location: 101 South Water Street; Mobile, Alabama
- Coordinates: 30.690°N 88.038°W
- Line: CSX NO&M Subdivision

Other information
- Station code: Amtrak: MOE

History
- Opened: 1881 (L&N); April 29, 1984 (Amtrak); October 29, 1989; August 18, 2025
- Closed: April 30, 1971 (L&N); January 6, 1985 (Amtrak); August 28, 2005
- Rebuilt: 1956, 2025

Passengers
- FY 2025: 12,356 (Amtrak)

Services
Preceding station	Amtrak	Following station
Pascagoula toward New Orleans	Mardi Gras Service	Terminus
Former services
Preceding station	Amtrak	Following station
Pascagoula toward Los Angeles	Sunset Limited (1993–2005)	Atmore toward Orlando or Miami
Pascagoula toward New Orleans	Gulf Coast Limited (1985–1986, 1996–1997)	Terminus
Terminus	Gulf Breeze (1989–1995)	Atmore toward Birmingham
Preceding station	Louisville and Nashville Railroad	Following station
Choctaw toward New Orleans	Main Line	Hurricane toward Cincinnati
Location

Mobile station is an Amtrak train station in Mobile, Alabama. It is the eastern terminal of the two daily round trips of the Mardi Gras Service. It replaced a station that was built in 1956 by the Louisville and Nashville Railroad (L&N) and demolished in 2007.

== History ==
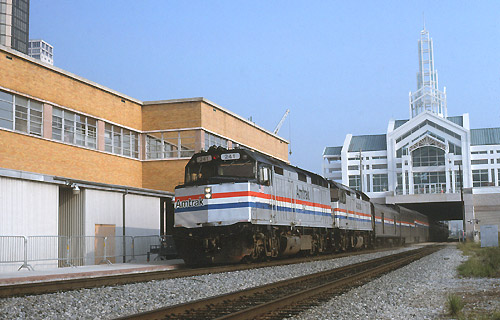
The Sunset Limited at the former station in 1993

Train service to Mobile began in 1881 when the L&N opened its original station at 11 Government Street in Mobile. In 1956 the L&N constructed a new building on the same site.

Former Louisville & Nashville services which utilized the station included the Pan-American (discontinued, 1971) and Humming Bird (discontinued, 1969). Through an agreement between the two rail companies, until 1970, the Southern Railway operated the Crescent through Mobile. Until 1971, the L&N operated the New Orleans–Jacksonville, Florida Gulf Wind through the station in cooperation with the Seaboard Coast Line (prior to 1967, Seaboard Air Line). In previous years the company additionally operated the New Orleans-Florida Limited, replete with diner and sleeper service, that made the trip during daylight hours in Florida for most of the route.

Amtrak service began with the Gulf Coast Limited, which operated between 1984 and 1985 and called at the station. Mobile then served as the southern terminus of the Gulf Breeze train starting in 1989. The Sunset Limited began stopping here in 1993, and the Gulf Breeze was discontinued in 1995. In 2005, Hurricane Katrina flooded the station and Amtrak discontinued the Sunset Limited east of New Orleans. In 2006, CSX sold the property to a developer, who razed the station in 2007.

=== Restoration of service ===
Amtrak announced in 2016 that plans for a return of the Sunset Limited were under consideration. By 2021, Amtrak announced the possibility of restarting service to Mobile as a restoration of the Gulf Coast Limited. Resumption of service would require the construction of new platforms and an overnight yard at the site. As of February 2024, there remained unresolved issues between Amtrak and Mobile over cost sharing and possible interference with port operations. However, on May 6, Mobile's Board of Zoning Adjustment approved a zoning exception that allows Amtrak to construct a temporary station near the site of the former station.

In June 2024, service restoration took a significant step forward when the city, state, and Port Authority reached a tentative agreement to fund the service for three years. The Port Authority reversed its earlier opposition because a federal grant of $70M for infrastructure improvements would benefit the port. In August, the Mobile city council approved the operating subsidy. By May 2025, a pocket track and a platform were under construction. Service to Mobile returned with the establishment of the Mardi Gras Service between New Orleans, Louisiana and Mobile on August 18, 2025.

== See also ==
- Mobile station (Gulf, Mobile and Ohio Railroad)
