= Schriever station =

Railway station in Schriever, Louisiana

Schriever, LA
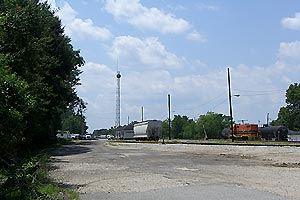

General information
- Location: 145 Burlington Court; Schriever, Louisiana; United States
- Coordinates: 29°44′48″N 90°48′56″W
- Line: BNSF/UP Lafayette Subdivision
- Platforms: 1 side platform
- Tracks: 2

Other information
- Station code: Amtrak: SCH

History
- Opened: October 26, 1975 (experimental stop); September 1976 (permanent stop)

Passengers
- FY 2025: 1,286 (Amtrak)

Services
Preceding station	Amtrak	Following station
New Iberia toward Los Angeles	Sunset Limited	New Orleans Terminus
Location

Schriever station is a train station in Schriever, Louisiana, United States served by Amtrak, the national railroad passenger system. The station was originally built by the Texas and New Orleans Railroad. Today it is also the Burlington Northern and Santa Fe Gulf Division office.

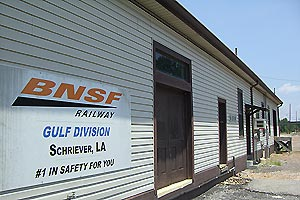
BNSF Gulf Division office
