= Coast Transit Authority =

Bus service provider in Mississippi, US

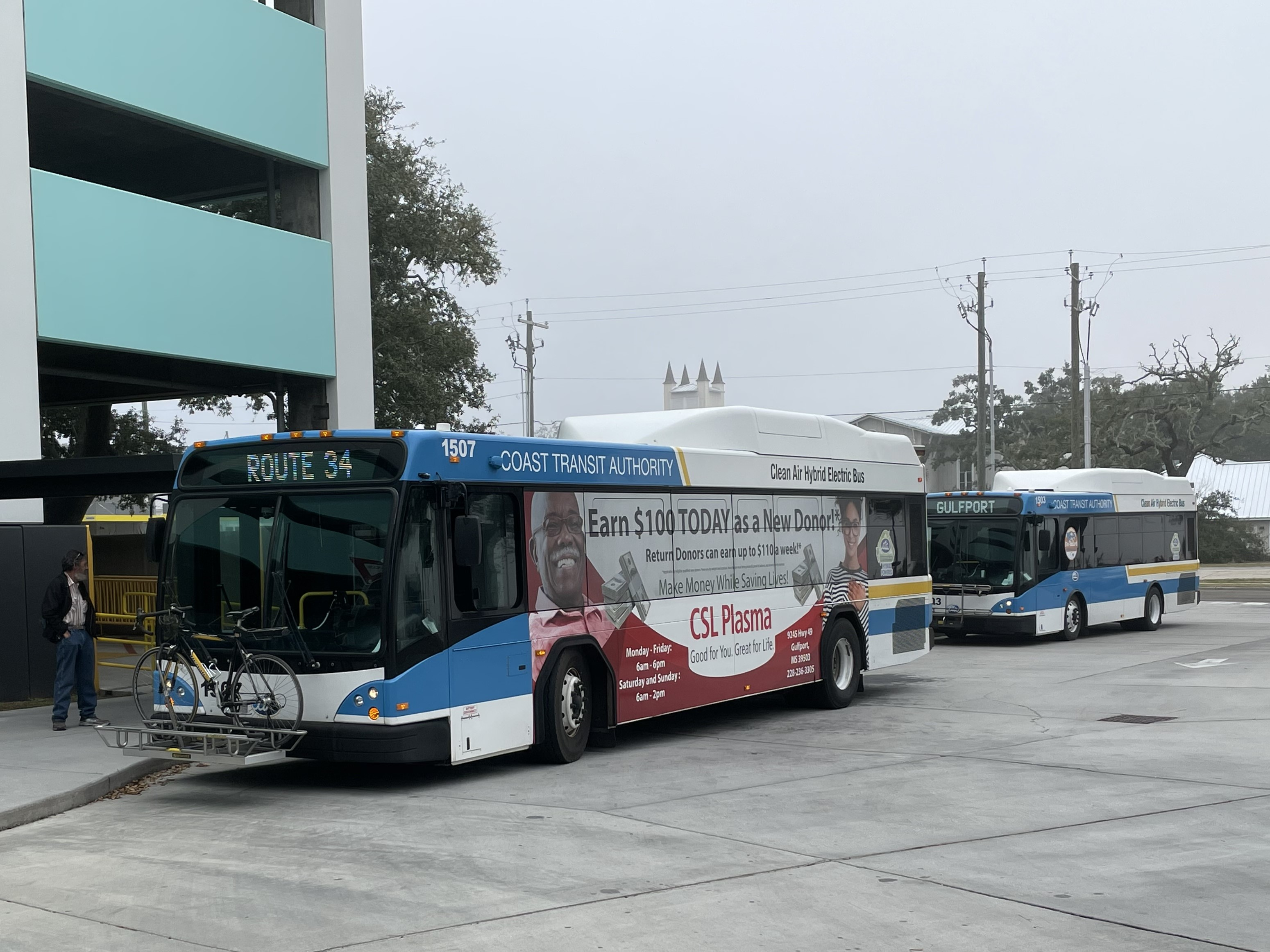
- Coast Transit Authority buses at the transit center in Gulfport, Mississippi
- Founded: 1974
- Headquarters: 333 DeBuys Road
- Locale: Gulfport, Mississippi
- Service area: Jackson County, Mississippi; Harrison County, Mississippi; Hancock County, Mississippi
- Service type: bus service, paratransit
- Routes: 10
- Website: www.coasttransit.com

The Coast Transit Authority is the primary provider of mass transportation in the Gulfport–Biloxi metropolitan area. Service was founded in 1974, after the Mississippi State Legislature passed a bill authorizing the creation of public transit for the region; the area's previous private bus operator, Municipal Transit Lines, had been devastated by Hurricane Camille, and the area was left with no public transportation for a 3-year period after the disaster. Originally known as the Mississippi Coast Transit Authority, the agency changed its name to Coast Area Transit in 1985, before arriving on its current moniker in 1992.

The agency operates seven regular routes over a three-county area. The most travelled of these routes, The Beachcomber, uses replica trolleys instead of standard buses. In addition, the Casino Hopper shuttle connects gambling facilities on the Biloxi waterfront.

== Routes ==
- 1 Beachcomber
- 2 Casino Hopper
- 4 D’Iberville
- 7 Ocean Springs
- 34 Gulfport/Biloxi Pass Road
- 37 Gulfport
- 38 Gulfport

== Fixed route ridership ==
The ridership and service statistics shown here are of fixed route services only and do not include demand response.

== See also ==
- List of bus transit systems in the United States
