= Humming Bird (train) =

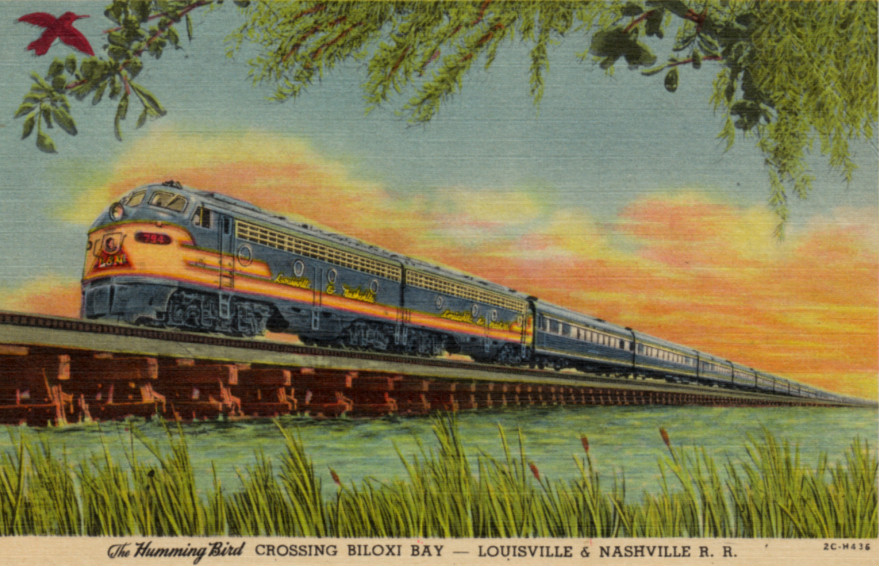
- Postcard of the Humming Bird circa 1940s-1950s

Overview
- Service type: Inter-city rail
- Status: Discontinued
- Locale: Midwestern United States; Southeastern United States
- First service: November 17, 1946
- Last service: January 9, 1969
- Former operator: Louisville & Nashville

Route
- Termini: Cincinnati, Ohio, Chicago, Illinois and St. Louis, Missouri; New Orleans, Louisiana and Memphis, Tennessee
- Distance travelled: 927 miles (1,492 km)
- Average journey time: Original schedule, 19 hours in each direction
- Service frequency: Daily
- Train number: Southbound: 5; Northbound: 6

On-board services
- Seating arrangements: Reclining seat coaches
- Sleeping arrangements: Open sections, roomettes, double bedrooms
- Catering facilities: Dining cars, tavern-lounge car

The Humming Bird was a named train of the Louisville and Nashville Railroad (L&N). The train, inaugurated in 1946, originally ran from Cincinnati, Ohio, to New Orleans, Louisiana, via Louisville, Nashville, Birmingham, Montgomery and Mobile and later via a connection at Bowling Green, Kentucky, to Memphis, Tennessee. A connection to Chicago was provided by the Chicago and Eastern Illinois Railroad.

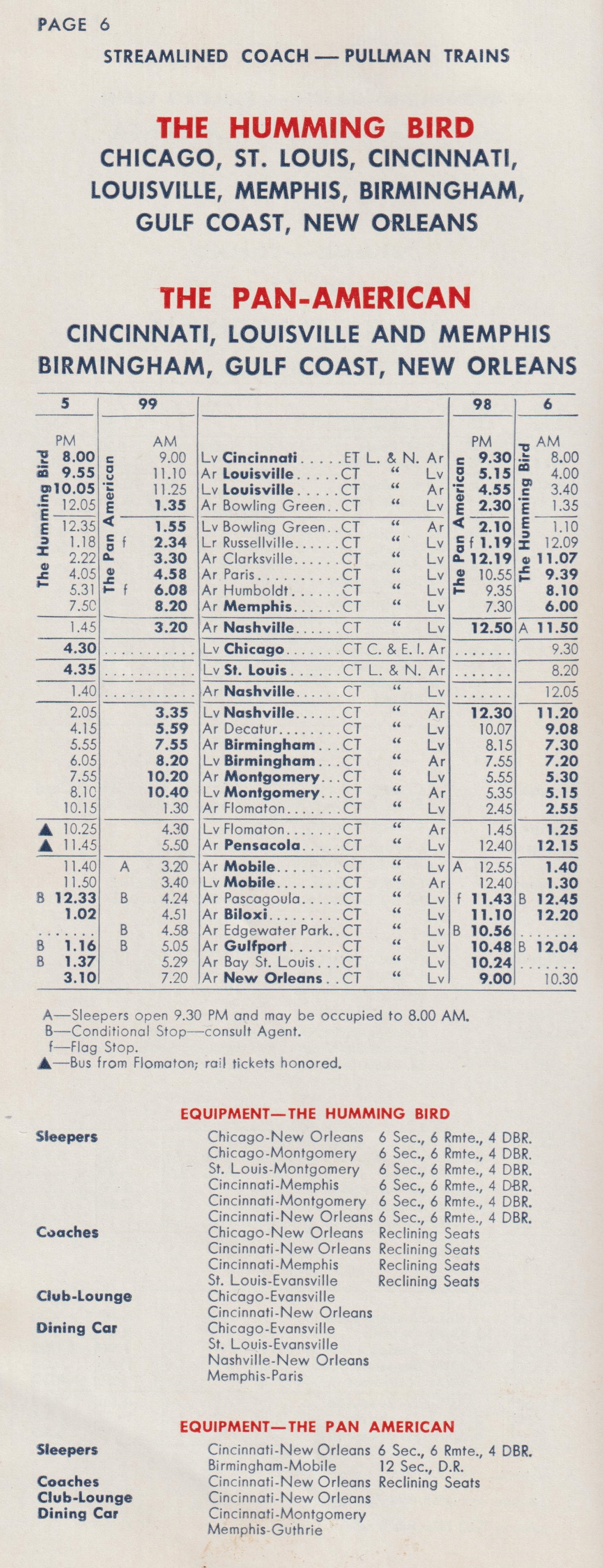
Condensed 1956 timetable documenting different northern origins and southern destinations of the Humming Bird, along with the train consist

The Humming Bird had separate sections in the north and the south. The main northern part originated in Cincinnati; other sections (of the L&N's Georgian) originated in St. Louis and from Chicago. These sections linked with the main part of the train in Nashville. At Bowling Green, Kentucky, a southwest-bound section broke off, bound for Memphis; whereas the main southern route continued south to Nashville and New Orleans. Also, en route to New Orleans, a connecting bus option in Flomaton, Alabama assisted with travel to Pensacola, Florida, while trains were used for the northbound trip.

In the mid-1950s, Train 5 departed Louisville at 10:05 pm for New Orleans. Train 6 was the northbound number.

The original equipment was part of a 28-car order of four train sets of lightweight stainless steel cars built in 1946 by ACF. Fourteen cars were assigned to the Humming Bird and fourteen to the Georgian. Many of those cars were removed from service in the late 1960s due to severe corrosion problems.

The L&N Railroad served the old Union Station in Memphis, until its closure on April 1, 1964. The railroad then used Central Station. Both L&N and Southern Railway were forced to reopen part of Union Station on December 1, 1966, and use it until March 30, 1968.

The Humming Bird was canceled on January 9, 1969. At that time, the L&N Railroad earned some unwanted publicity when it terminated the final run of the train en route southbound at Birmingham when a federal judge lifted the order keeping the train running after the Interstate Commerce Commission approved its permanent discontinuance. The passengers were then bused to their destinations.

The train inspired the song "Hummingbird" by country artist Ricky Skaggs and was mentioned in the song "Southern Rains" by country artist Mel Tillis.

== Important stations on the Humming Bird route ==
- Cincinnati, Ohio: Cincinnati Union Terminal
- Louisville, Kentucky: Union Station
- Bowling Green, Kentucky: L&N Station
- Nashville, Tennessee: Union Station
- Decatur, Alabama: Southern Depot
- Birmingham, Alabama: L&N Station (from 1960)
- Montgomery, Alabama: Union Station
- Mobile, Alabama: L&N station
- Gulfport, Mississippi: Gulfport station
- New Orleans, Louisiana: New Orleans Union Passenger Terminal

Throughout its run, the Humming Bird had an additional northern-originating section running from Chicago' Dearborn Station, to Terre Haute, to Evansville, then meeting up with the main New Orleans bound train at Nashville. The C&EI ended the Chicago - Nashville branch of the train by February 1968.

The main Cincinnati originating section had a branch that broke off at Bowling Green and headed southwest to Memphis, Tennessee's Union Station.
