= Pan-American (train) =

Cincinnati-New Orleans passenger rail service

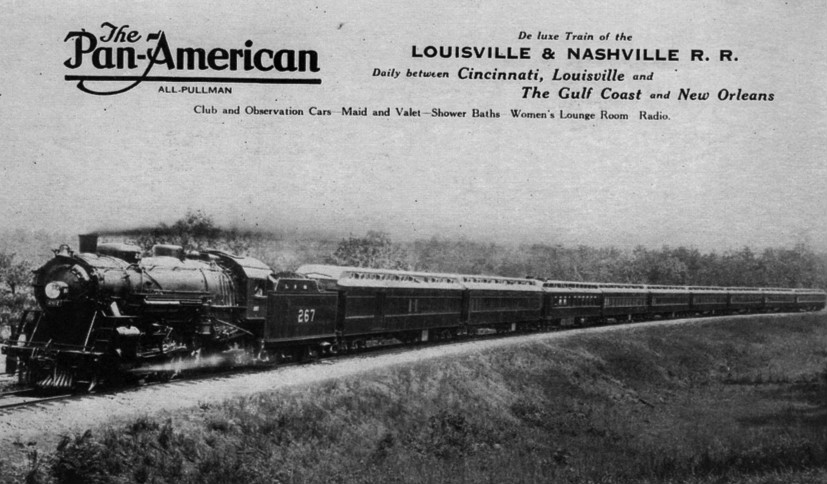
- Postcard photo of the heavyweight train

Overview
- Status: Discontinued
- Locale: Midwestern United States/southeastern United States
- First service: December 5, 1921
- Last service: April 30, 1971
- Former operator: Louisville and Nashville Railroad

Route
- Termini: Cincinnati, Ohio; New Orleans, Louisiana
- Distance travelled: 922 miles (1,484 km)
- Average journey time: Southbound: 23 hrs 10 min; northbound: 23 hrs 15 min
- Service frequency: Daily
- Train number: Southbound: 99, northbound: 98

On-board services
- Seating arrangements: Reclining seat coaches
- Sleeping arrangements: Roomettes, double bedrooms
- Catering facilities: Dining car; lounge car

The Pan-American was a passenger train operated by the Louisville and Nashville Railroad (L&N) between Cincinnati, Ohio and New Orleans, Louisiana. It operated from 1921 until 1971. From 1921 to 1965 a section served Memphis, Tennessee via Bowling Green, Kentucky. The Pan-American was the L&N's flagship train until the introduction of the Humming Bird in 1946. Its name honored the substantial traffic the L&N carried to and from the seaports on the Gulf of Mexico. The Pan-American was one of many trains discontinued when Amtrak began operations in 1971.

== History ==
The L&N introduced the Pan-American on December 5, 1921. A section of the train diverged at Bowling Green, Kentucky to serve Memphis, Tennessee. At the outset the train carried both sleepers and coaches, and was noteworthy for its all-steel construction in an era when wood heavyweight coaches were still common. The name honored the substantial traffic the L&N carried to and from the seaports on the Gulf of Mexico. It covered the 921 miles (1,482 km) from Cincinnati to New Orleans in 26 hours, soon shortened to exactly 24 hours.

The train proved popular with the traveling public, and in 1925 was re-equipped as an "All-Pullman" (no coaches) train. Its popularity contributed to businesses named after it; the Pan-American Lunch Room operated in Nashville, Tennessee in the 1920s. The economic pressures of the Great Depression forced the Pan-American to start carrying coaches again in 1933.

Like many L&N trains, the Pan-American experienced a surge in ridership during World War II, carrying four times its normal traffic. The Pan-American lost its title as the L&N's flagship train in 1946 with the introduction of faster Humming Bird over the same route. Although never fully streamlined, the Pan-American began receiving streamlined equipment in 1949. The southbound Pan-American carried through sleepers for Nashville, Tennessee, Louisville, Kentucky and Memphis from New York City conveyed by the Pennsylvania Railroad in Cincinnati. Further south in Montgomery, Alabama it received New York-New Orleans and Washington-New Orleans sleepers from the Southern Railway's Piedmont Limited.

In 1953 the Pan-American was one of several L&N trains to receive new lightweight "Pine"-series sleeping cars from Pullman-Standard. Throughout the 1960s, the decline of passenger railroading in the United States took its toll on ridership and amenities. A counter-lounge replaced the diner-lounge in 1965. The Pan-American began handling some of the South Wind's through traffic in 1970 after the Penn Central withdrew from joint operation. By 1970 the train's consist had shrunk dramatically: between Cincinnati and Louisville it might carry only a baggage car, coach, and dining car, with a sleeper for New Orleans added in Louisville. Amtrak did not retain service over the L&N route, and the Pan-American ended on April 30, 1971.

== Cultural influence ==
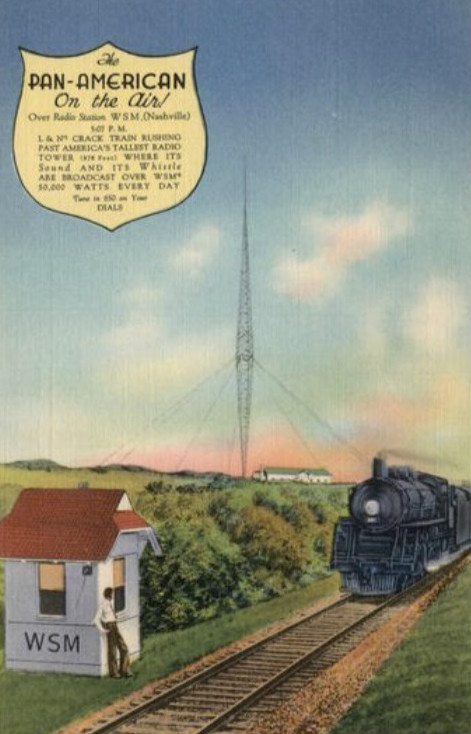
Postcard of the Pan-American passing the WSM transmitter in Nashville

In the words of Kincaid Herr, official historian of the L&N, the Pan-American "came to be the symbol of the L&N's passenger service." The train was made famous by WSM Radio's nightly broadcast of the passing train's whistle. Some Pan-American passengers were lucky enough to sit in comfortable lounge chairs and hear the sound of their own train's whistle from a wood-cabinet table radio tuned to WSM in the observation car. The broadcasts began on August 15, 1933.

The Pan-American inspired several songs:

- "Pan-American Blues" (1926) by DeFord Bailey
- "Pan-American" (1948) by Hank Williams
- "Pan-American Boogie" (1949) by the Delmore Brothers

"Pan-American Blues" was one of two railroad songs recorded by DeFord Bailey (the other being "Dixie Flyer Blues", so named for another L&N train. Bailey saw the Pan-American frequently at Nashville's Union Station in the 1920s, but the inspiration for name came from one of his foster sisters, who noted that "it was the fastest around." Bailey, with his harmonica, imitated the sound of the Pan-American's whistle and it quickly became one of his most-requested performances at the Grand Ole Opry and elsewhere.
