= New Orleans station (Louisville and Nashville Railroad) =

Louisville and Nashville Passenger Station
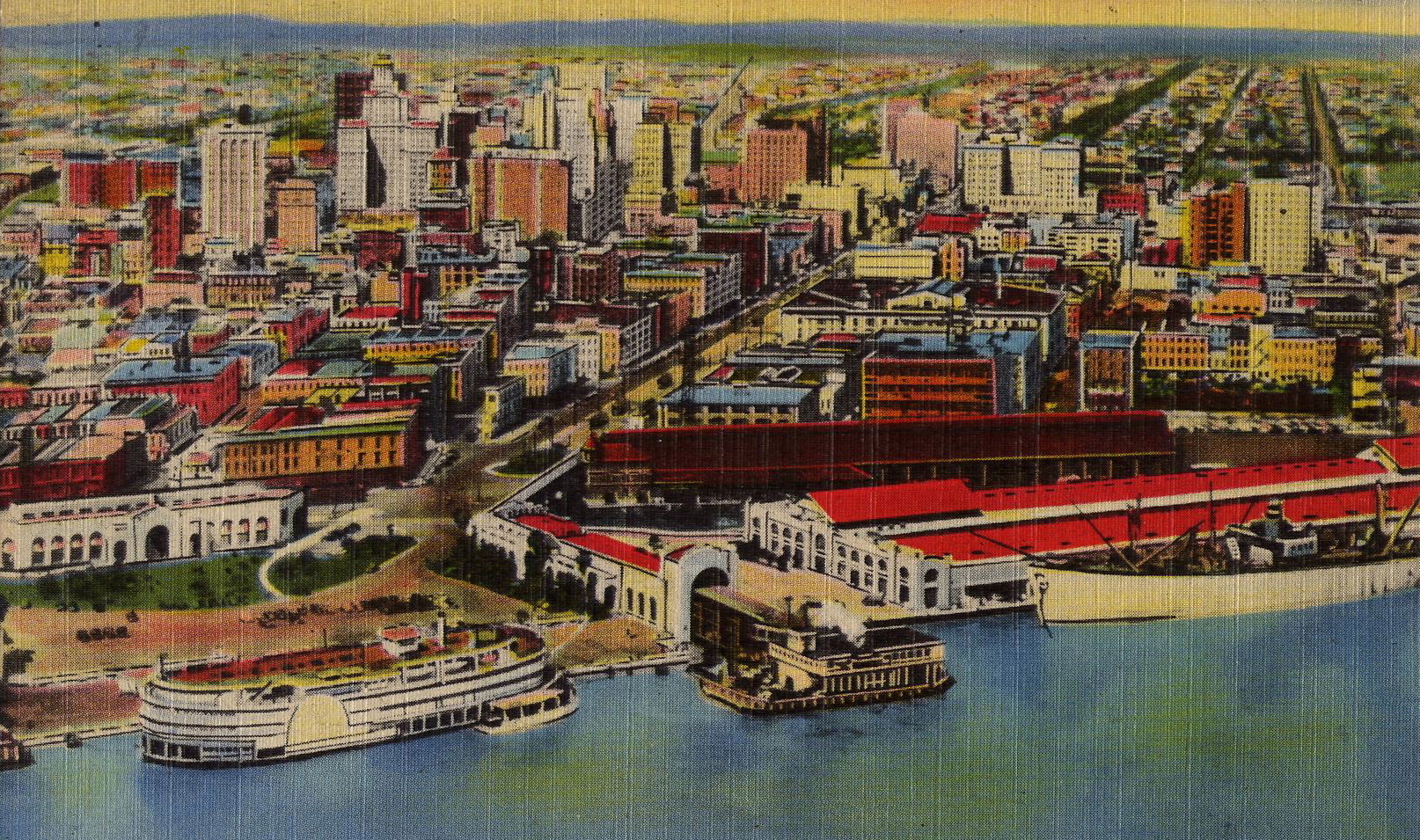
- The Louisville & Nashville Station is visible just behind the Iberville Street Wharf

General information
- Location: Canal Street; New Orleans, Louisiana
- Coordinates: 29°57′2″N 90°03′50″W
- System: Passenger Station
- Operator: Louisville and Nashville Railroad (L&N)
- Tracks: 3

History
- Opened: 1902
- Closed: 1954

Former services
Preceding station	Louisville and Nashville Railroad	Following station
Terminus	Main Line	Pontchartrain Junction toward Cincinnati
Location

The Louisville and Nashville Passenger Station was a former train station of the Louisville and Nashville Railroad in New Orleans, Louisiana. The station was located at the foot of Canal Street, and provided service to New Orleans from Birmingham, Montgomery, and Mobile. By the 1940s, six passenger trains arrived daily on the terminal's three tracks.

The station was demolished in early 1954 after all passenger service was relocated to the new Union Passenger Terminal.

== Design ==
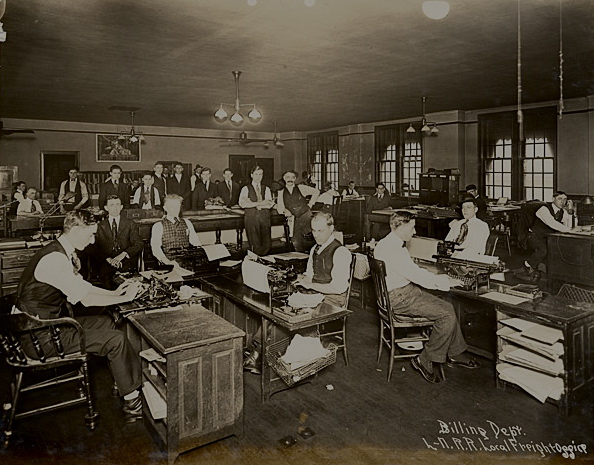
L&N's New Orleans billing department in 1917

The one-story brick building constructed in 1902 with a 165-foot-long (50 m) concourse that paralleled the main building. An open side, steel train shed spanned the three tracks and was 550 feet (170 m) long. The station contained the following rooms:

- general waiting room (30 ft wide and 45 ft long)
- colored waiting room (25 ft wide and 35 ft long)
- two small rest rooms
- one baggage room (30 ft wide and 60 ft long)

Mail and express packages were handled direct from the cars to trucks.
