= New Orleans Union Passenger Terminal =

Rail station in New Orleans, Louisiana

New Orleans, Louisiana
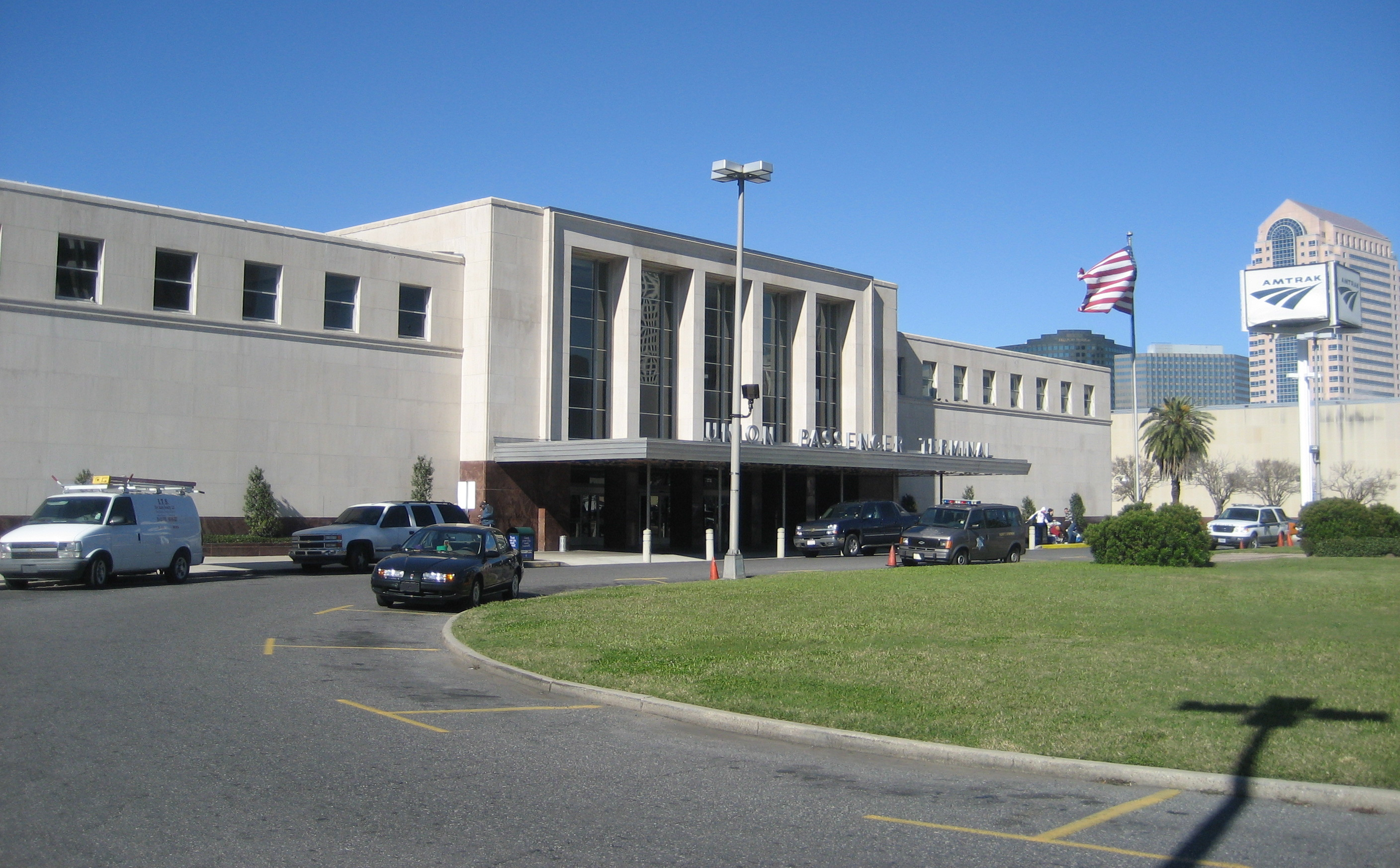

General information
- Location: 1001 Loyola Avenue; New Orleans, Louisiana; United States
- Coordinates: 29°56′46″N 90°04′43″W
- Owner: City of New Orleans
- Platforms: 4 island platforms (3 in use), 1 side platform
- Tracks: 7, 2 removed
- Train operators: Amtrak
- Bus stands: 16
- Bus operators: Greyhound Lines; Megabus
- Connections: RTA: 103, 114A, 114B, 202

Construction
- Parking: 180 long term spaces
- Accessible: Yes

Other information
- Station code: Amtrak: NOL

History
- Opened: 1954
- Rebuilt: 2005

Passengers
- FY 2025: 188,071 (Amtrak)

Services
Preceding station	Amtrak	Following station
Terminus	City of New Orleans	Hammond toward Chicago
Terminus	Crescent	Slidell toward New York
Terminus	Mardi Gras Service	Bay St. Louis toward Mobile
Schriever toward Los Angeles	Sunset Limited	Terminus
Preceding station	New Orleans Regional Transit Authority	Following station
Terminus	Rampart/Loyola	Julia Street toward Elysian Fields Avenue
Future services
Preceding station	Amtrak	Following station
Jefferson Parish toward Baton Rouge	New Orleans–Baton Rouge (possibly 2027)	Terminus
Former services
Preceding station	Amtrak	Following station
Schriever toward Los Angeles	Sunset Limited (1993–2005)	Bay St. Louis toward Orlando or Miami
Terminus	Gulf Coast Limited	Bay St. Louis (1996–1997) toward Mobile
Terminus	Gulf Coast Limited	East New Orleans (1984–1985) toward Mobile
Preceding station	New Orleans Regional Transit Authority	Following station
Terminus	Loyola–Riverfront	Julia Street toward French Market
Preceding station	Illinois Central Railroad	Following station
Terminus	Main Line	Carrollton Avenue toward Chicago
Terminus	New Orleans – Baton Rouge	Carrollton Avenue toward Baton Rouge
Preceding station	Kansas City Southern Railway	Following station
Carrollton Avenue toward Hope	Louisiana and Arkansas Railway	Terminus
Preceding station	Louisville and Nashville Railroad	Following station
Terminus	Main Line	Carrollton Avenue toward Cincinnati
Preceding station	Missouri Pacific Railroad	Following station
Avondale toward Alexandria	Alexandria – New Orleans	Terminus
Carrollton Avenue toward El Paso	Texas and Pacific Railway Main Line	Terminus
Carrollton Avenue toward Houston	Houston – New Orleans	Terminus
Preceding station	Southern Pacific Railroad	Following station
Carrollton Avenue toward Los Angeles	Sunset Route	Terminus
Preceding station	Southern Railway	Following station
Terminus	New Orleans – Cincinnati	Carrollton Avenue toward Cincinnati
Track layout
Location

New Orleans Union Passenger Terminal (NOUPT) is an intermodal facility in New Orleans, Louisiana, US. Located at 1001 Loyola Avenue, it is served by Amtrak, Greyhound Lines, Megabus, and NORTA with direct connections to the Rampart–Loyola Streetcar Line.

The station is the major southern terminus hub for Amtrak, serving three long-distance trains, the City of New Orleans, the Crescent, and the Sunset Limited, and one regional train, the Mardi Gras Service. Between 1993 and the strike of Hurricane Katrina in 2005, the Sunset Limited continued east to Florida. Since the hurricane, New Orleans has been the eastern terminus of the route, although in 2016 Amtrak did propose bringing back service east of New Orleans.

Amtrak operates a coach and engine yard near the terminal.

== History ==
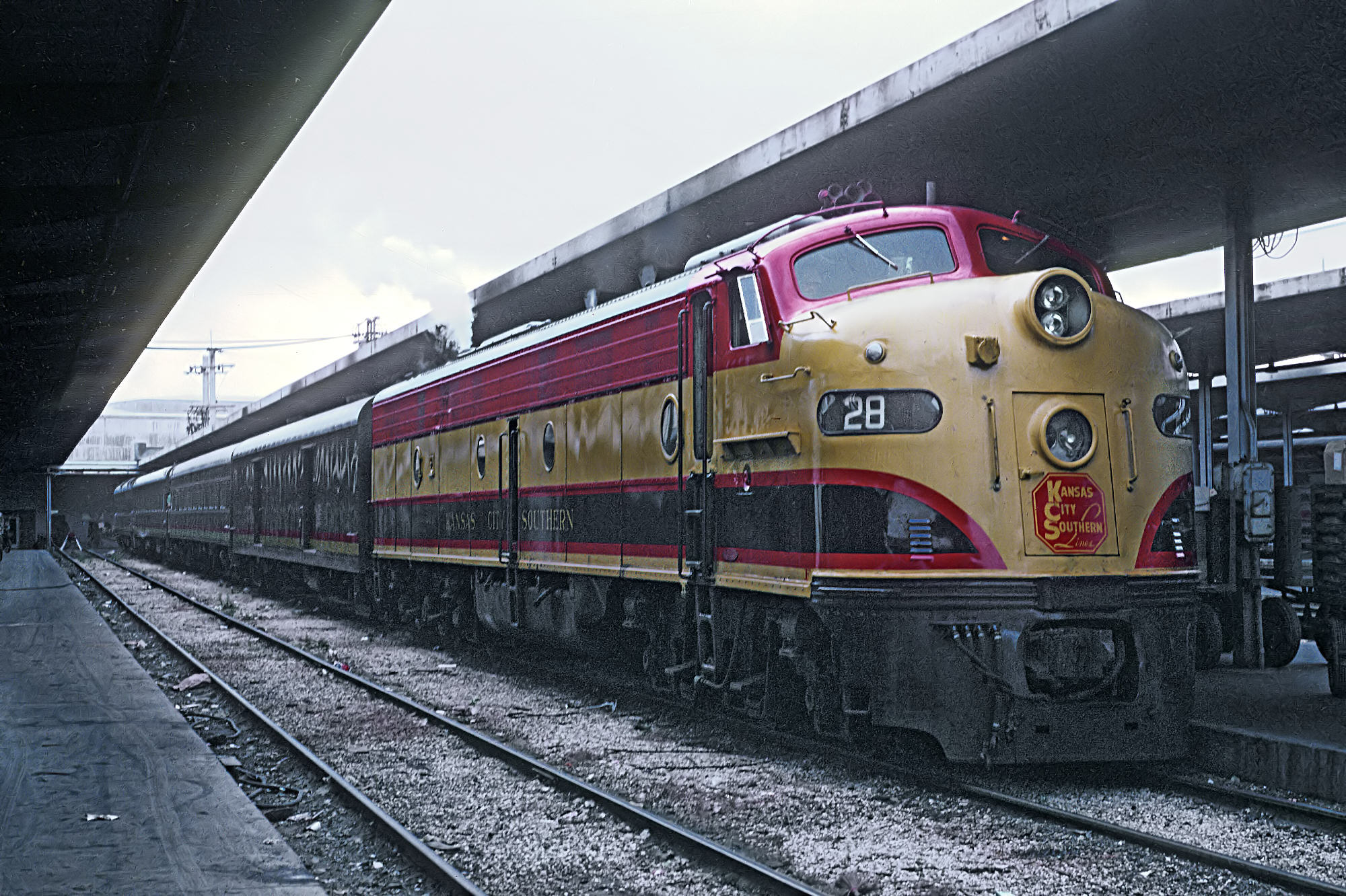
The Kansas City Southern Railway's Flying Crow at New Orleans Union Terminal on November 22, 1967

Union Passenger Terminal was built just west of the older New Orleans Union Station to consolidate the city's passenger rail operations. Previously, New Orleans had been served by five stations–Union Station, the Southern Railway Terminal, T&P Station, Louisiana & Arkansas Station, and Louisville & Nashville Station.

Parts of the station property also are over what once was the turning basin for the New Basin Canal. The main lead track to the terminal follows the path of the old canal (which was filled in) and the Pontchartrain Expressway/I-10.

NOUPT was designed in 1949 by the New Orleans architectural firms of Wogan and Bernard, Jules K. de la Vergne, and August Perez and Associates. When it opened in 1954, it was considered an ultramodern facility, completed just at the time that air travel was taking off at the expense of rail travel.

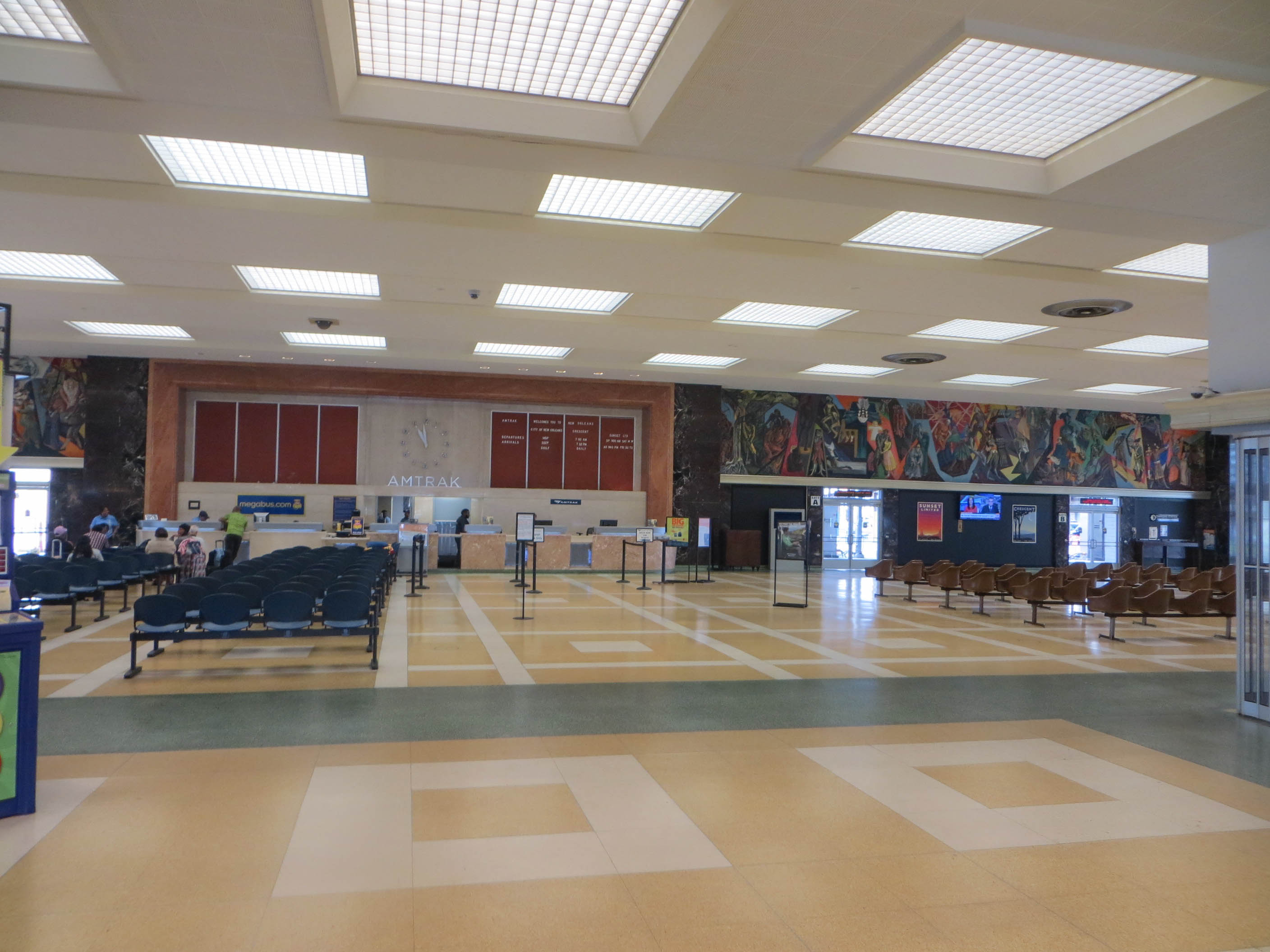
Interior of New Orleans Union Passenger Terminal

The stub-end terminal consists of covered platforms and a modern waiting hall. A 120-foot (37 m) long mural of Louisiana and New Orleans history, painted by Conrad A. Albrizio with the assistance of James Fisher, was restored after 2005's Hurricane Katrina. The freight and express houses are now the domain of the Smoothie King Center and Main Post Office.

In the 1970s, parts of two platforms were shortened to allow for Greyhound Lines to move its service there, creating an intermodal facility.

Following Hurricane Katrina, Amtrak provided the first commercial transportation out of New Orleans. During the recovery efforts, the bus station at NOUPT was used for a temporary jail nicknamed Camp Greyhound.

In January 2013, the station became the terminus for the new mile-long Loyola Avenue-Union Passenger Terminal Streetcar Line connecting Canal Street with the Central Business District and destinations such as the Superdome. The $52 million project was largely funded through a $45 million Transportation Investments Generating Economic Recovery (TIGER) grant awarded to the New Orleans Regional Transit Authority by the U.S. Department of Transportation.

Megabus started operations at the Union Passenger Terminal in 2015.

Gulf Coast regional officials have been advocating for restoration of daily train service between New Orleans and Florida since 2016.

In February 2021, it was announced that passenger rail service would return to the Gulf Coast with a new Amtrak route (later named the Mardi Gras Service) between New Orleans and Mobile. Stops include Bay St. Louis, Gulfport, Biloxi, and Pascagoula. Service began on August 18, 2025.
