= NO&M Subdivision =

Railroad line from Alabama to Louisiana

The NO&M Subdivision is a railroad line owned by CSX Transportation in the U.S. states of Alabama, Mississippi, and Louisiana. The line runs from Mobile, Alabama, to New Orleans, Louisiana, for a total of 138.5 miles (222.9 km). At its east end it continues west from the M&M Subdivision and at its west end it continues west as the CSX Transportation.

== See also ==
- List of CSX Transportation lines
