= Valena =

Valena may refer to:

- Valena, Mississippi in Attala County, Mississippi, US

== People with the given name Valena ==
- Valena C. Jones (1872–1917) American educator and principal
- Valena Valentina (born 1988) Indian karate player

== Other ==
- Valena C. Jones School (Mississippi) in Bay St. Louis, Mississippi, US
