= Arthur Piper =

Arthur Piper may refer to:

- Arthur Lewis Piper (1883–1983), medical missionary in the Belgian Congo
- Arthur William Piper (1865–1936), judge of the Supreme Court of South Australia
- Arthur Maine Piper (1898-1989), geologist, researcher and inventor of the Piper diagram
