= Southwestern Christian Advocate =

African-American newspaper in the southern U.S.

- Type: Weekly African-American
- Publisher: Methodist Episcopal Church
- Launched: 1877; 149 years ago
- Ceased publication: 1929; 97 years ago
- City: New Orleans, Louisiana
- Country: United States
- ISSN: 2639-0124
- OCLC number: 10123905

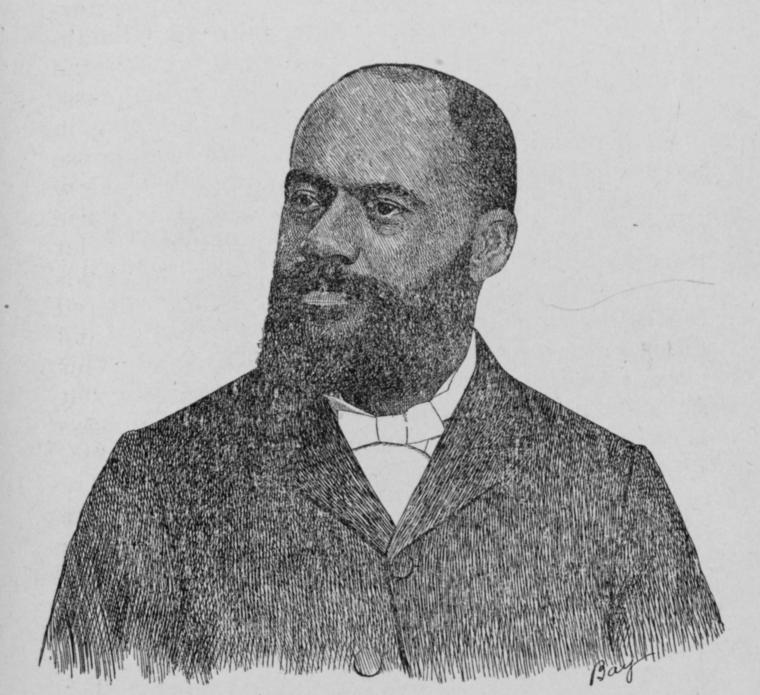
Dr. I. B. Scott, Editor of the Southwestern Christian Advocate, 1900

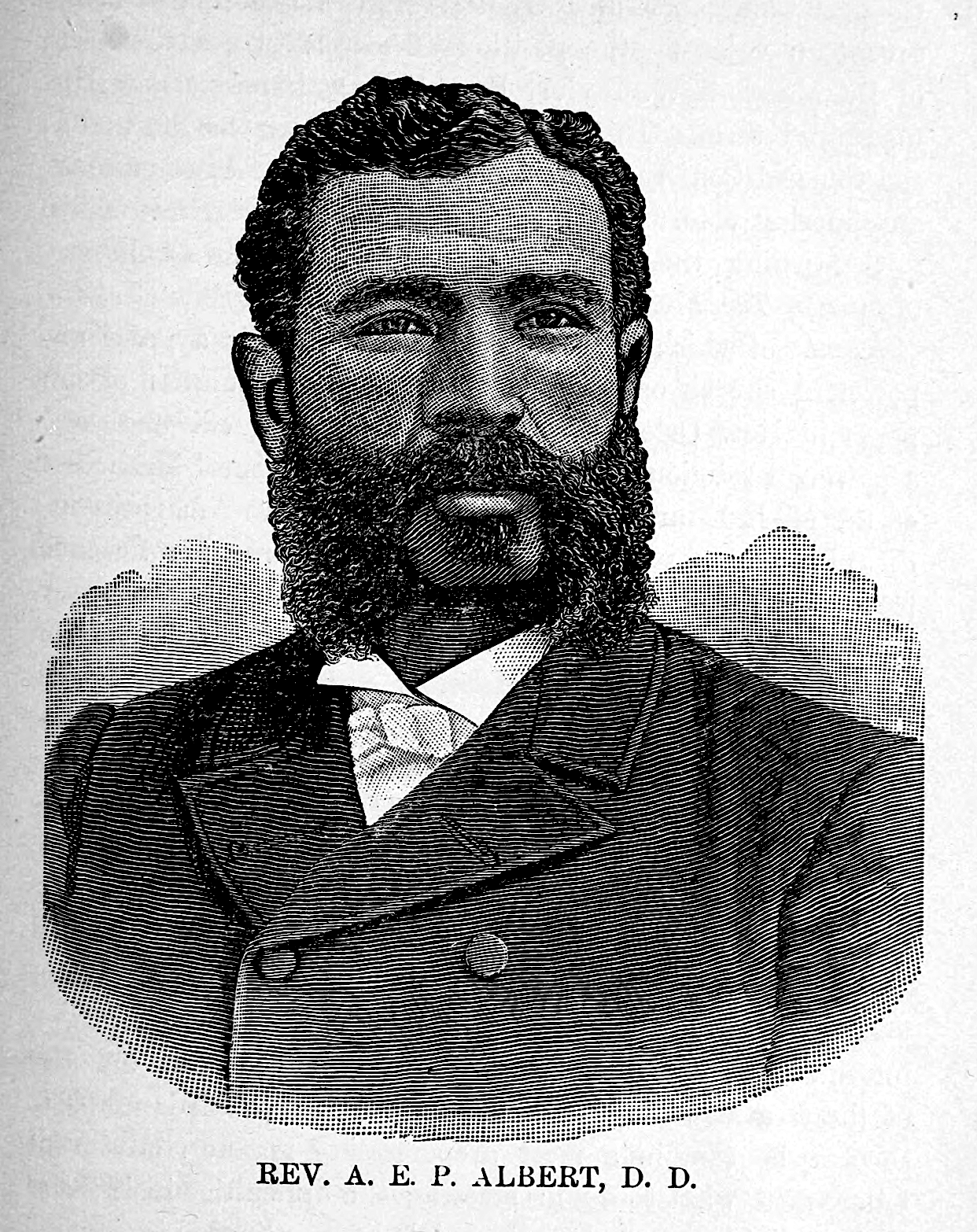
Rev. A. E. P. Albert, D. D., Editor of the Southwestern Christian Advocate, 1891.

The Southwestern Christian Advocate (1877–1929) was an American newspaper published by the Methodist Episcopal Church in New Orleans, Louisiana and distributed in the Southern United States. It was an African American newspaper that was also read by the White community more so than any other African American newspaper in the Union.

== History ==
The Advocate was an official publication of the Methodist Episcopal Church, and was printed in New Orleans, Louisiana. The publication targeted a Methodist, and served both an African-American and White audience. It featured a "Lost Friends" section for people searching for loved ones lost to slavery. The newspaper was instrumental in organizing Booker T. Washington's tour of Louisiana in 1915.

Editors of the Advocate included Joseph C. Hartzell (from c. 1877 to 1881), A. E. P. Albert (from 1879 to 1880), I. B. Scott, Hiram Rhodes Revels and Rev. Robert E. Jones from 1904 to 1920. The newspaper business manager was Matthew Simpson Davage from 1905 to 1915. Valena C. Jones, the wife of Rev. Robert E. Jones, assisted with editing the newspaper between 1901 and 1913.

The Library of Congress has microfilm of the paper in its collection.

== See also ==
- Christian Advocate, a weekly newspaper
- Nashville Christian Advocate, successor newspaper
