= Old Bay St. Louis Historic District =

District in Hancock County, Mississippi, US

- U.S. National Register of Historic Places
- U.S. Historic district
- Location within Mississippi
- Location: Roughly bounded by Beach Blvd, Third St on the E; Breath Ln and Hwy 90 on the N; Seminary Dr, St. Francis St, and Old Spanish Trail on the W, and Carre Ct., Washington St., and Bookter St. on the S Bay St. Louis, Hancock County, Mississippi, US
- Area: 504 acres (204 ha)
- Architectural style: Late 19th And 20th Century Revivals, Late 19th And Early 20th Century American Movements, Modern Movement
- NRHP reference No.: 10000441
- Added to NRHP: July 8, 2010

The Old Bay St. Louis Historic District is a historic district in the small coastal town of Bay St. Louis, Mississippi, US. The district is composed of 504 acres (204 ha) and contains 939 resources, including 681 contributing properties. In 1980, the National Park Service had certified the boundaries of four historic districts in the city. The earlier four historic district were named the Beach Boulevard Historic District, Washington Street Historic District, Sycamore Street Historic District, and Main Street Historic District. The city's districts were reassessed by the Federal Emergency Management Agency (FEMA) in the aftermath of Hurricane Katrina on August 29, 2005 and reclassified as the Old Bay St. Louis Historic District. It has been listed by the National Register of Historic Places since July 8, 2010.

== History ==
=== Beach Boulevard Historic District ===
The largest of the four distinct districts is the Beach Boulevard Historic District, which encompassed 690 buildings and 362.5 acres (146.7 ha) and includes a nearly two-mile strip of Beach Boulevard, as well as a business core and residential neighborhood. The Old Bay St. Louis Historic District includes the extant sections of the 1980s defined Beach Boulevard Historic District, as well as a large residential area to the west of the old district boundaries.

Around 30% of the buildings in Beach Boulevard Historic District were destroyed after Hurricane Katrina; and many were lost in the earlier Hurricane Camille in 1969. Those houses that survive were built mostly between 1860 and 1960, and they include Central-passage houses, Queen Anne, Colonial Revival, Spanish Revival, and Craftsman style houses.

=== Washington Street Historic District ===
The Washington Street Historic District is a 2.18 acres (0.88 ha), twelve-building district located primarily on the south side of Washington Street.

=== Sycamore Street Historic District ===
The Sycamore Street Historic District is composed of buildings mostly on the north side of Sycamore Street, and to the east and west of Old Spanish Trail. Much of the historic resources listed in the Sycamore Street Historic District in 1980 were destroyed after Hurricane Katrina.

=== Main Street Historic District ===
The Main Street Historic District is 10 acres (4.0 ha) and six buildings located on the south side of Main Street, near U.S. Highway 90.

== Notable buildings and structures listed ==
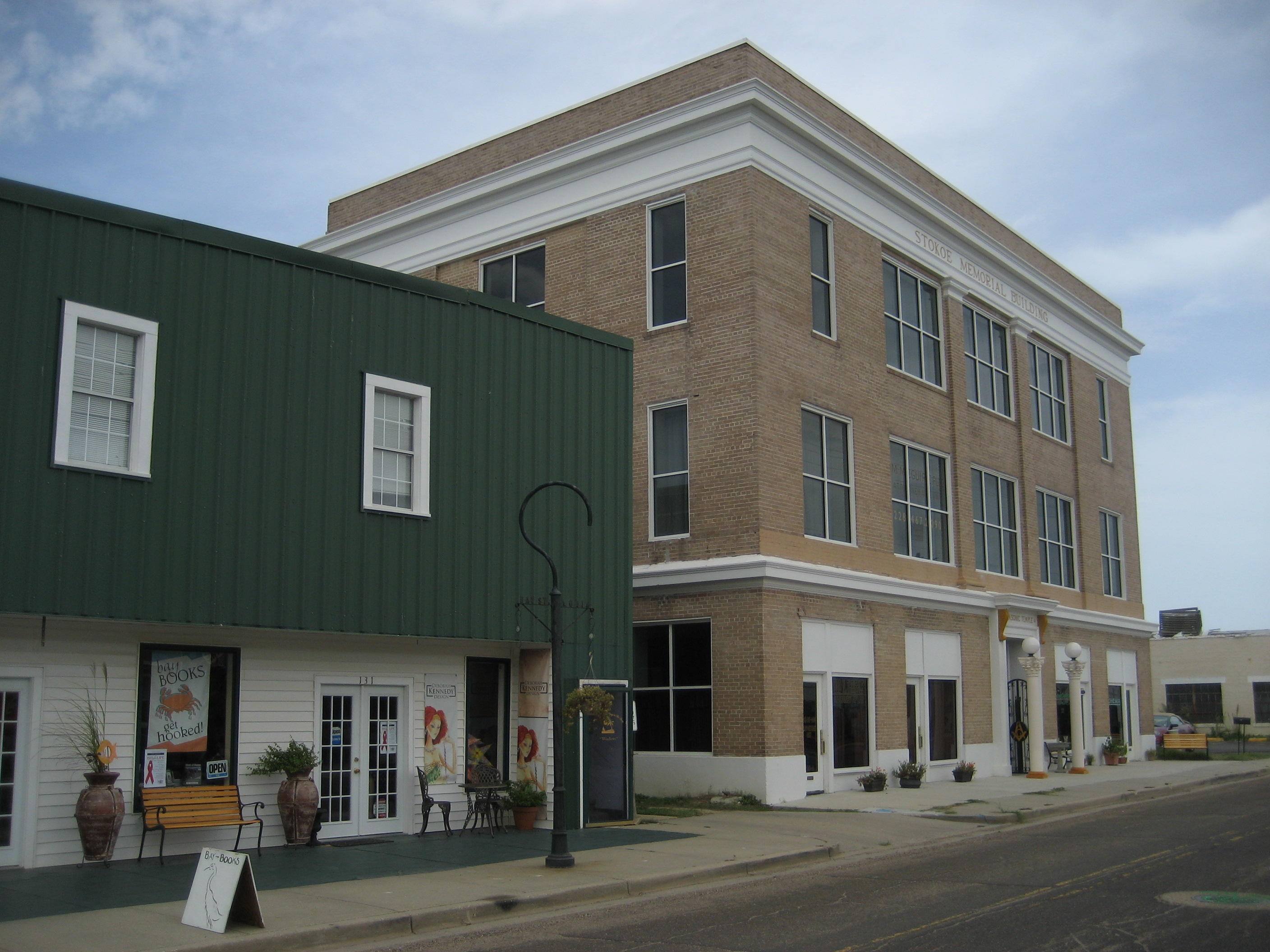
Masonic Temple (1925), on right

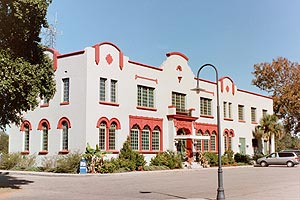
Louisville and Nashville Railroad Depot in Bay St. Louis (1929)

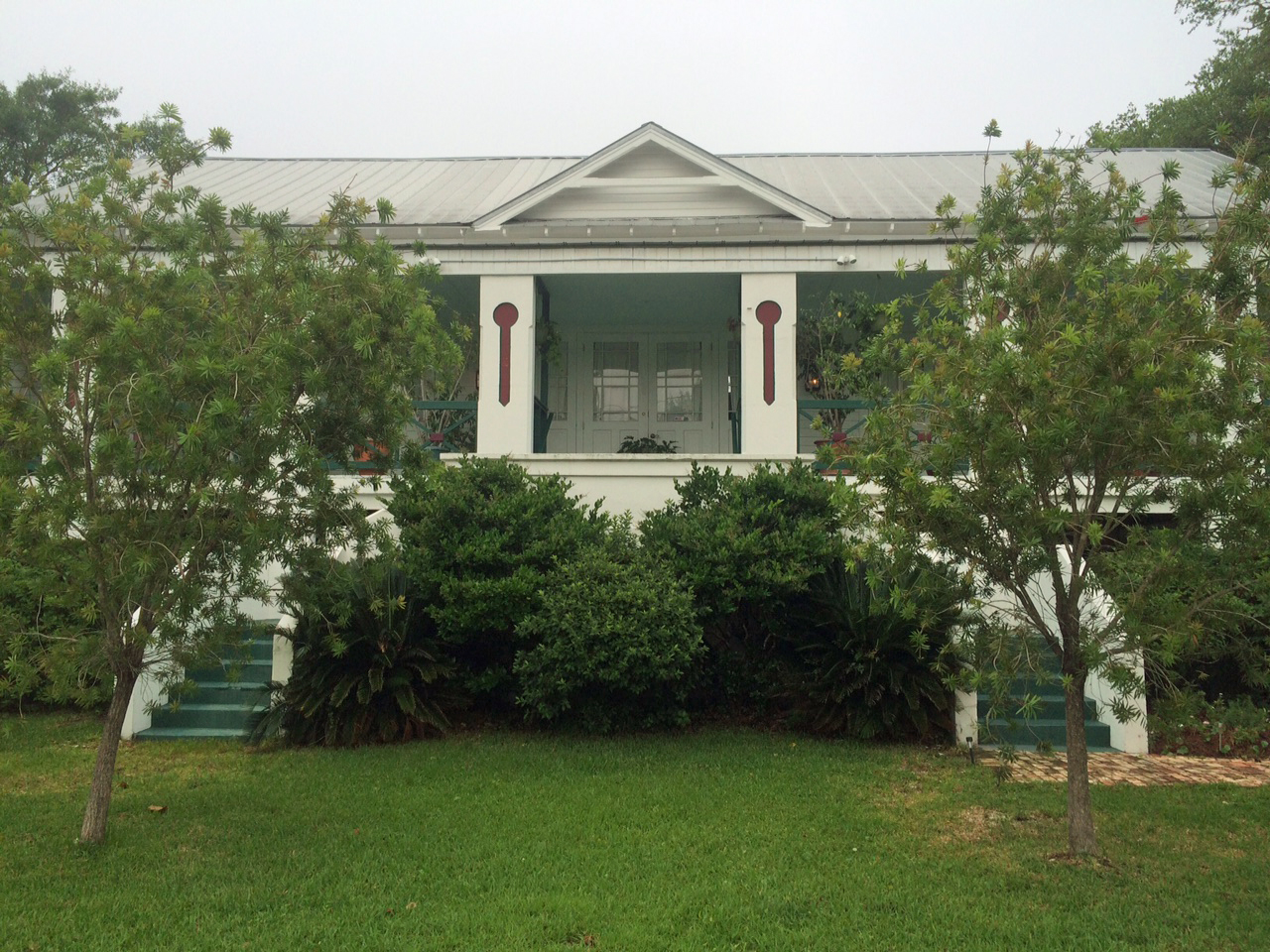
Webb School (1913)

=== Cemeteries ===
- Cedar Rest Cemetery (1860)
- Brothers of the Sacred Heart Cemetery (1867); part of the St. Stanislaus Catholic School complex
- St. Mary’s Catholic Cemetery (1872)
- St. Augustine Seminary Cemetery (1929)

=== Churches ===
- Main Street United Methodist Church (c. 1895), 162 Main Street
- Divine Word Chapel (1920)
- Valena C. Jones Memorial United Methodist Church (1926), 248 Sycamore Street
- St. Rose de Lima Catholic Church (1926), 301 South Necaise Avenue
- First Baptist Church of Bay St. Louis (2007),141 Main Street

=== Commercial ===
- Bay St. Louis Ice, Light & Bottling Works Building (1900), 398 Blaize Avenue
- Hancock Bank Building (1900), 100 South Beach Boulevard
- Sea Coast Echo Building (c. 1902) 200 North Beach Boulevard
- Woodmen of the World Hall (1909) 112 South Second Street
- Masonic Temple (1925), 125 Main Street
- A&G Theater (1927), 150 North Beach
- Louisville and Nashville Railroad Depot (1929), 1928 Depot Way
- Porter’s Gas Station (c. 1930) 109B Ulman Avenue

=== Residential ===
- 206 Union Street (c. 1860); Central-passage style
- 146 Main Street (c. 1865); Creole Cottage style
- 235 Washington Street (1880); Creole Cottage style
- 217 St. Charles Street (c. 1890); Creole Cottage style
- 247 Ballentine Street (c. 1890); Shotgun style
- 304 North Toulme Street (c. 1895); Shotgun style
- 304 South Second Street (1900); Double Shotgun style
- 313 Carroll Avenue (c. 1905); Biloxi Cottage style
- 204 Union Street (1917); Shotgun style
- 241 Washington Street (1925); Double Shotgun Craftsmen style
- 416 Citizen Street (1875); Central-passage style

=== Schools ===
- Webb School (1913), 300 Third Street; NRHP-listed
- Second Street School (c. 1926), 400 North Second Street
- Valena C. Jones School (1947), 310 Old Spanish Trail; ML-listed
- Ingram Building (1954), 213 Ulman Avenue
- St. Rose de Lima Catholic School (1955), 301 South Necaise Avenue

== See also ==
- National Register of Historic Places listings in Hancock County, Mississippi
