= Taylor School =

Taylor School may refer to:

- Taylor School (Davenport, Iowa), listed on the National Register of Historic Places in Scott County, Iowa
- Taylor School (Bay St. Louis, Mississippi), formerly listed on the National Register of Historic Places in Hancock County, Mississippi. Destroyed by Hurricane Katrina.
