= Isaiah Scott =

Isaiah Scott may refer to:

- Isaiah Benjamin Scott, American clergyman
- Swerve Strickland, American professional wrestler formerly known as Isaiah "Swerve" Scott
