= Thomas M. Scott =

Confederate Army brigadier general

Thomas Moore Scott
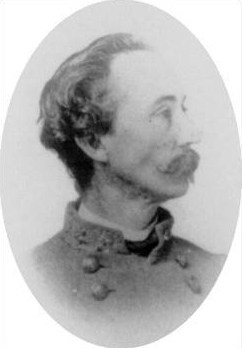
- Born: 1829; Athens, Georgia
- Died: April 21, 1876 (aged 46–47); New Orleans, Louisiana
- Burial place: Greenwood Cemetery, New Orleans
- Military career
- Allegiance: Confederate States of America
- Branch: Confederate States Army
- Service years: 1861–1865
- Rank: Brigadier General
- Commands: 12th Louisiana Infantry Regiment; Scott's Brigade
- Conflicts: American Civil War

Thomas Moore Scott (1829 – April 21, 1876) was a Confederate States Army brigadier general during the American Civil War. He saw active service in several battles in the Western Theater of the American Civil War. He was a planter before and after the war.

== Early life ==
Thomas M. Scott was born in Athens, Georgia in 1829 but moved to Louisiana, Tennessee, back to LaGrange, Georgia and finally back to Louisiana where he was a planter.

== American Civil War ==
Scott was appointed colonel of the 12th Louisiana Infantry Regiment on August 13, 1861. He served at the Battle of Belmont, although not actively engaged, and at the battles of Island Number Ten, New Madrid, Fort Pillow, the Siege of Vicksburg, including the Battle of Baker's Creek and the operations of General Joseph E. Johnston in Mississippi in which he tried to relieve the forces besieged at Vicksburg, and during the Atlanta campaign, initially under the command of Lieutenant General Leonidas Polk.

Scott was promoted to the grade of brigadier general on May 10, 1864 after distinguished service at the beginning of the Atlanta campaign. He was severely wounded in the back from concussion of a shell on November 30, 1864 at the Battle of Franklin and apparently saw no further action. No record of his parole has been found.

== Aftermath ==
Scott returned to farming in Louisiana, operating a sugar plantation on the Gulf Coast for some years.

Thomas Moore Scott was found dead in a chair in the Sample Coffee House in New Orleans on April 21, 1876. He died from alcoholic arrest of brain functions. He is interred in Greenwood Cemetery, New Orleans.

== See also ==
- List of American Civil War generals (Confederate)
