= Octavia Rogers Albert =

African-American author and biographer (1853–889)

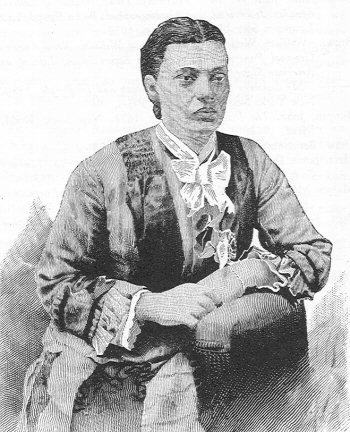
- Born: Octavia Victoria Rogers; December 24, 1853; Oglethorpe, Georgia
- Died: August 19, 1889 (aged 35)
- Occupations: Author and biographer
- Spouse: Aristide Elphonso Peter Albert (m. 1874)
- Children: 1
- Writing career
- Genre: Biography
- Notable works: The House of Bondage, or Charlotte Brooks and Other Slaves (1890)

Octavia Rogers Albert (December 24, 1853 – August 19, 1889) was an African-American author and biographer. She documented slavery in the United States through a collection of interviews with formerly enslaved people in her book The House of Bondage, or Charlotte Brooks and Other Slaves, which was posthumously published in 1890.

== Early life ==
Octavia Rogers Albert, born, Octavia Victoria Rogers grew up in Olgethorpe, Georgia. She was born into slavery and experienced the harsh realities that came with it during her early life. After gaining her freedom following the abolition of slavery in the United States, she was determined to pursue an education. She enrolled at Atlanta University, now known as Clark Atlanta University, in 1870 with the goal of becoming a teacher. In 1873, she began her first teaching position in Montezuma, Georgia, where she dedicated herself to educating others in her community. Albert also viewed her role as teacher as form of Christian service, using both education and faith to uplift those around her.

=== Personal life ===
While working in Montezuma, Georgia, Octavia Rogers Albert met Aristide Elphonso Peter Albert, who was both a teacher and a physician. The two married in 1874 and later had one daughter named Laura T. Albert. Throughout her life, Albert maintained a strong religious faith that played an important role in both her personal and professional life. While living in Olgethorpe, she attended the African Methodist Episcopal (AME) Church under the leadership of Bishop Henry M. Turner, who was formerly a congressman and influential political activist. In 1877, her husband, A.E.P Albert was ordained as a minister in the African Methodist Episcopal Church, making a significant moment for their family's religious life. After his ordination, Octavia Rogers Albert later converted to Methodism and was baptized by her husband in 1888.

The family later relocated to Houma, Louisiana, where Albert became widely recognized as both a community and a religious leader. She remained actively engaged in supporting and uplifting others, especially in the African American community. Albert opened her home to community members, encouraging them to gather at her home to share their personal experiences of their lives while being enslaved. Understanding the importance of these stories, Albert took the time to document them. The collected stories were later published in her book, The House of Bondage; or, Charlotte Brooks and the Other Slaves, which was an important contribution to preserving the lived experiences of formerly enslaved individuals and highlighting their voices for future generations.

== Literary contributions ==
=== The House of Bondage, or Charlotte Brooks and Other Slaves ===
This book was published in December 1890. Octavia Rogers Albert was a 19th- century African American writer and educator. She used her work to preserve the voices and memories of slavery, more specifically from the Louisiana community. To document the stories of enslaved people in the Louisiana area, Albert used interviews to document these experiences. Octavia Rodgers Albert began conducting interviews with men and women in Houma, Louisiana, who were once enslaved. She first met Charlotte Brooks in 1879 to interview her, along with other formerly enslaved people from Louisiana.The House of Bondage, or, Charlotte Brooks and other Slaves by Octavia Rodgers Albert focuses heavily on the religious faith, resilience, and moral reflections of slavery during this time. The emphasis on religion further illustrates how faith functioned as a source of strength and meaning for many individuals during this time period. Some major themes addressed in these narratives include the cruelty and violence of slavery, family separation, and resistance. After the American Civil War, formerly enslaved people were free but faced many challenges as they tried to rebuild their lives in the south. The connection between local Louisiana history and broader national narratives of slavery lies in how individual and community experiences reflect the larger systems and impacts of slavery.This book emphasizes the historical significance of oral history by demonstrating how firsthand stories from formerly enslaved people are a source of information about slavery and the reconstruction era experiences in Louisiana. Oral history preserves these accounts. The main purpose of Albert’s book was to reveal the harsh realities of slavery through personal testimonies including the testimony of Charlotte Brooks. This book remains relevant because it documents perspectives that are often underrepresented in historical records.

=== Purpose ===
The stories of formerly enslaved people documented by Octavia Rogers Albert challenged the plantation myth and the belittlement of black freedom that had been perpetuated by some white novelists and historians. One recurring theme in Albert's writing is the conditions of slavery, including physical punishment, harsh labor, and the separation of families. The narratives she gathered also provide insight into how black women navigated and resisted the limitations imposed upon them. Her book is based on interviews with formerly enslaved individuals and showcases a collection of personal narratives describing life in the American South during slavery. Albert's work functions as both a literary text and a historical record, documenting individual experiences in the nineteenth century. It is particularly valuable for its focus on the contributions of black women, who played a significant role in sustaining family structures and cultural traditions despite systemic oppression.

In addition to its historical and literacy significance, the work can also be viewed as a religious text. Albert's strong Christian faith often served as a source of hope, resilience, and moral guidance during slavery and in the years following emancipation. References to prayer, divine justice, and spiritual endurance highlight how religion shaped the world's view of formerly enslaved people and provided framework for understanding their suffering and perseverance. The book also highlights the struggle for freedom and the challenges African Americans faced both before and after emancipation. Some scholars have compared Albert's work to that of Harriet Jacobs, as both emphasize that those who directly experienced slavery were the best to testify to its realities. Through her interviews, Albert wanted to present an accurate account of slavery by centering the voices of those who lived through it.

== See also ==
- Slave narrative
