= Young Marshall Moody =

American brigadier general (1822–1866)

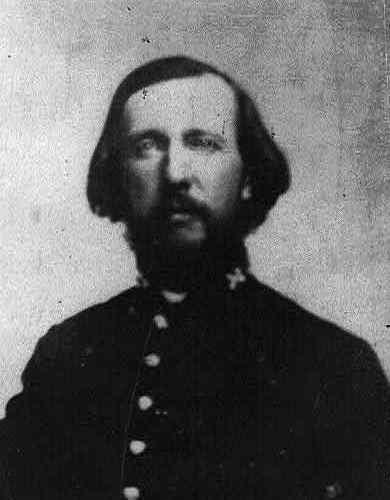
- Library of Congress
- Born: June 23, 1822; Chesterfield County, Virginia, U.S.
- Died: September 18, 1866 (aged 44); New Orleans, Louisiana, U.S.
- Burial place: Greenwood Cemetery
- Military career
- Allegiance: Confederate States of America
- Branch: Confederate States Army
- Service years: 1861—1865
- Rank: Brigadier General
- Unit: 11th Alabama Infantry
- Commands: 43rd Alabama Infantry; Moody's Brigade
- Conflicts: American Civil War

Young Marshall Moody (June 23, 1822 – September 18, 1866) was a Confederate States Army officer who was promoted to brigadier general near the end of the American Civil War. He was a teacher, merchant, and circuit court clerk in Marengo County, Alabama, before the war. He died from yellow fever during a business trip to New Orleans, Louisiana, on September 18, 1866.

== Early life ==
Young Marshall Moody was born on January 23, 1822, in Chesterfield County, Virginia. In 1842, he moved to Alabama where he worked as a teacher, merchant, and between 1856 and 1861, clerk of the circuit court of Marengo County, Alabama.

== American Civil War ==
Young Marshall Moody entered Confederate States Army service as captain of Company A of the 11th Alabama Infantry Regiment on June 11, 1861. Archibald Gracie III was major of the regiment. Gracie and Moody served with the 11th Alabama Infantry in northern Virginia but returned to Mobile in order to recruit the 43rd Alabama Infantry Regiment in April 1862. Gracie became colonel and Moody became lieutenant colonel of the regiment. In November 1862, Gracie was promoted to brigadier general and Moody was appointed colonel of the regiment on November 4, 1862.

Moody fought in the Kentucky Campaign, including the Battle of Perryville, and at the Battle of Chickamauga, the Siege of Chattanooga, the Siege of Knoxville and the Battle of Bean's Station. While Gracie was recovering from a wound, Moody supervised the transfer of the brigade to the Petersburg, Virginia, area where they served under the command of General P.G.T. Beauregard.

On May 16, 1864, Moody was wounded in the right ankle at Drewry's Bluff during the Battle of Proctor's Creek, part of the Bermuda Hundred Campaign. Moody's regiment served with Gracie's brigade during the Siege of Petersburg until Gracie was killed by an exploding artillery shell on December 2, 1864. Moody then took command of the brigade but he was not promoted to brigadier general until March 4, 1865. Moody led the brigade until he was captured at Appomattox Court House, Virginia, on April 8, 1865, the day before the surrender by General Robert E. Lee of the Army of Northern Virginia to Union Army forces led by Lieutenant General Ulysses S. Grant.

Moody was paroled at Appomattox Court House on April 9, 1865. He was pardoned on July 20, 1866, two months before his death.

== Aftermath ==
Moody became a businessman in Mobile, Alabama, after the war. On September 18, 1866, Young Marshall Moody died of yellow fever while on a business trip to New Orleans. He is buried in Greenwood Cemetery there.

== See also ==
- List of American Civil War generals (Confederate)
