= Leonard Olivier =

His Excellency, The Most Reverend Leonard James Olivier S.V.D
- Auxiliary Bishop of Washington
- Archdiocese: Archdiocese of Washington

Orders
- Ordination: June 29, 1951 by Richard Oliver Gerow
- Consecration: November 7, 1988 by James Aloysius Hickey

Personal details
- Born: October 12, 1923 Lake Charles, Louisiana, US
- Died: November 19, 2014 (aged 91)

Leonard James Olivier, SVD (October 12, 1923 – November 19, 2014) was an African-American Catholic prelate who served as an auxiliary bishop for the Archdiocese of Washington from 1988 to 2004. He was a member of the Society of the Divine Word.

== Biography ==
=== Early life ===
Leonard Olivier was born in Lake Charles, Louisiana, on October 12, 1923 to Mathilde (nee Rochon) and James L. Olivier. After entering the Society of the Divine Word in 1939, he began studying for the priesthood at St. Augustine Seminary in Bay St. Louis, Mississippi. After finishing his studies, he remained at St. Augustine to teach other seminarians. He professed his religious vows to the Society in 1944.

=== Priesthood ===
On June 29, 1951, Olivier was ordained a priest in Bay St. Louis by Bishop Richard Oliver Gerow for the Society of the Divine Word. He received a Master of Education degree from the Catholic University of America in Washington, D.C. He was named as assistant dean and then dean of seminarians.

In 1952, Olivier was named dean of students at St. Augustine, then in 1967 became rector of the seminary. He left St. Augustine in 1974 to serve as rector of Divine Word Seminary in Epworth, Iowa and as secretary for education and formation for the Order. In 1983, his Order returned Olivier to Louisiana, where he served as pastor at St. Anthony Parish in Lafayette. He also served as part-time vicar for Black Catholics in the Diocese of Lafayette in Louisiana. He became full-time vicar for Black Catholics in 1986.

=== Auxiliary Bishop of Washington ===
On November 7, 1988, Olivier was appointed as an auxiliary bishop of Washington by Pope John Paul II. He was consecrated on December 20, 1988 at the National Shrine of the Immaculate Conception in Washington by Cardinal James Aloysius Hickey. Olivier served as regional bishop of most of the deaneries in the archdiocese.

Olivier served as the convener of the African American Catholic Bishops Subcommittee on Youth, the Ad Hoc Steering Committee for the National Strategy on Vocations, and the Task Force Group for American Adaptations to the Order of Christian Marriage, and the Liturgy Committee of the USCC/NCCB.

Within the National Conference of Catholic Bishops, Olivier was a member of the Committee on Bishops Life and Ministry. He was also a board member of Covenant House Washington, a member of the Inter-Faith Conference, a member of the Maryland Catholic Conference, a board member of the National Black Catholic Congress, a member of the National Black Catholic Clergy Caucus, and episcopal moderator of the Pan African Roman Catholic Clergy Conference.

=== Retirement and death ===
Olivier retired as auxiliary bishop of Washington on May 18, 2004. He died on November 19, 2014, at age 91.

== Personal life ==
Olivier was a Fourth Degree Knight of Peter Claver, Knight of St. John and a Knight of Columbus.
