= A. E. P. Albert =

American newspaper editor and physician (1853–1910)

A. E. P. Albert Sr.
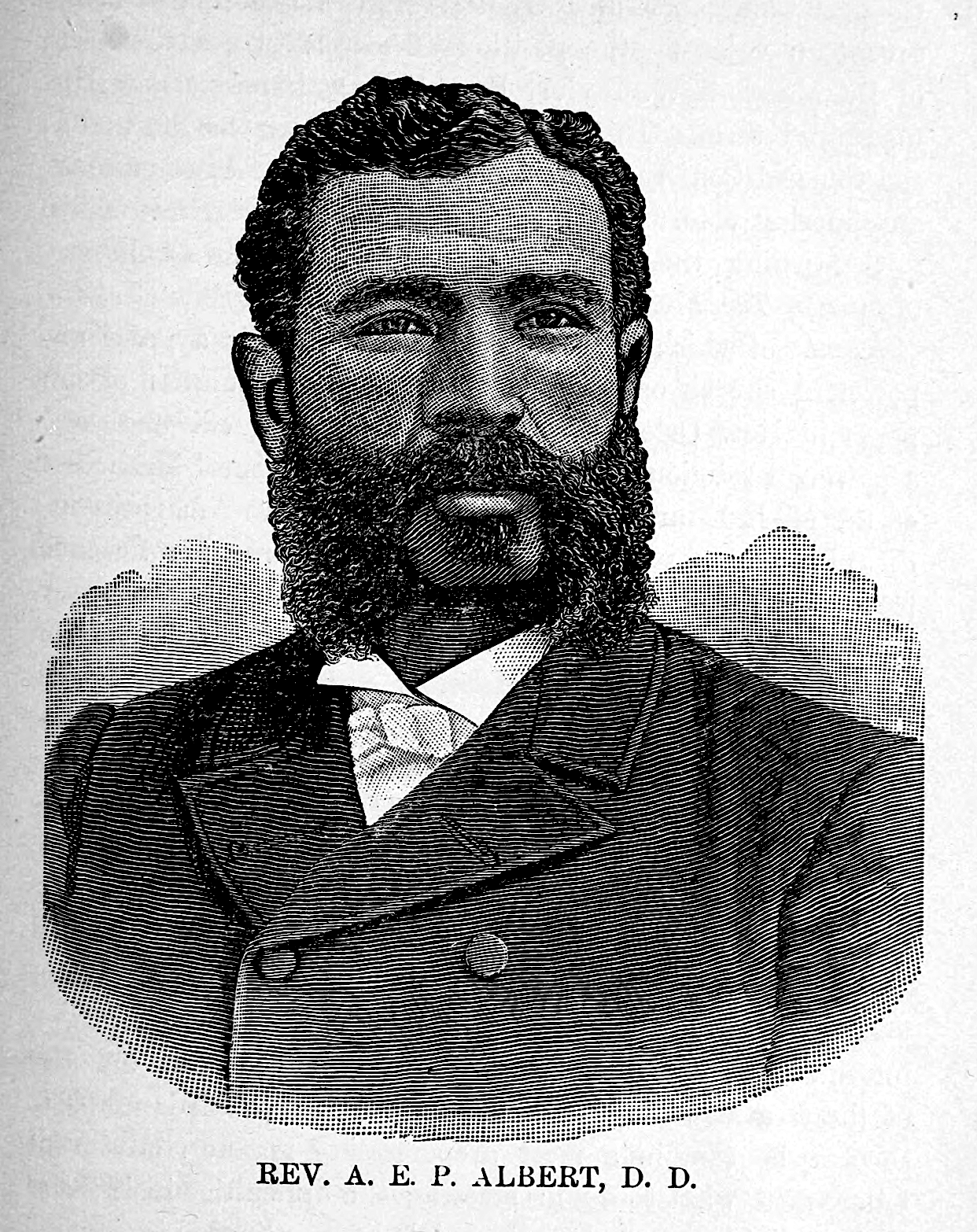
- Born: Aristide Elphonso Peter Albert; December 10, 1853; New Orleans, Louisiana, U.S.
- Died: September 6, 1910 (aged 56); Carrollton, New Orleans, Louisiana, U.S.
- Education: Straight University
- Occupations: Newspaper editor, physician, surgeon, minister, theologian, educator
- Spouse: Octavia Victoria Rogers Albert

Rev. Aristide Elphonso Peter Albert Sr. (December 10, 1853 – September 6, 1910), was an American newspaper editor, theologian, professor, Methodist minister, physician, and surgeon. He edited the South-Western Christian Advocate newspaper.

== Biography ==
A. E. P. Albert was born on December 10, 1853, in New Orleans, Louisiana, United States. His father was Pierre Albert from Bordeaux, France (some sources state he was from Louisiana), and his mother Elizabeth was of African heritage and enslaved by a French man in Louisiana. After the Union Army captured New Orleans during the American Civil War, he ran away from home and attended private school taught by William Barner.

He continued his education at a Freedmen's Bureau school, public schools in Atlanta, the Congregational Theological school, and Clark College of Atlanta. Albert graduated with a B.D. degree (1881) from Straight University(now Dillard University) in New Orleans. Rust University (now Rust College) awarded him an honorary degree in 1885; and he received an honorary degree from Central Tennessee College in the 1870s.

Albert edited The Kentucky Methodist newspaper in 1872, while he pastored the Coke Chapel (later known as New Coke, and then Coke Memorial Church) in Louisville, Kentucky. He served as the editor of the Southwestern Christian Advocate newspaper from 1879 to 1880, and he was the first Black person to hold this role. On June 30, 1882, Albert spoke at the Central Church of New Orleans, in response to a 1879 speech by Sen. John Percival Jones of Nevada on the status and labor rights of Chinese immigrants to the United States. By 1891, Albert was a professor of theology at New Orleans University, and served as the president of the board of trustees of the university.

He died on September 6, 1910, of tuberculosis (or consumption) at age 57 at his home in the Carrollton neighborhood at 1420 Lowerline Street, New Orleans. A profile of him is included in the book The Afro-American Press and Its Editors (1891).
