= Greenwood Cemetery, New Orleans =

Historic cemetery in Orleans Parish, Louisiana

Greenwood Cemetery
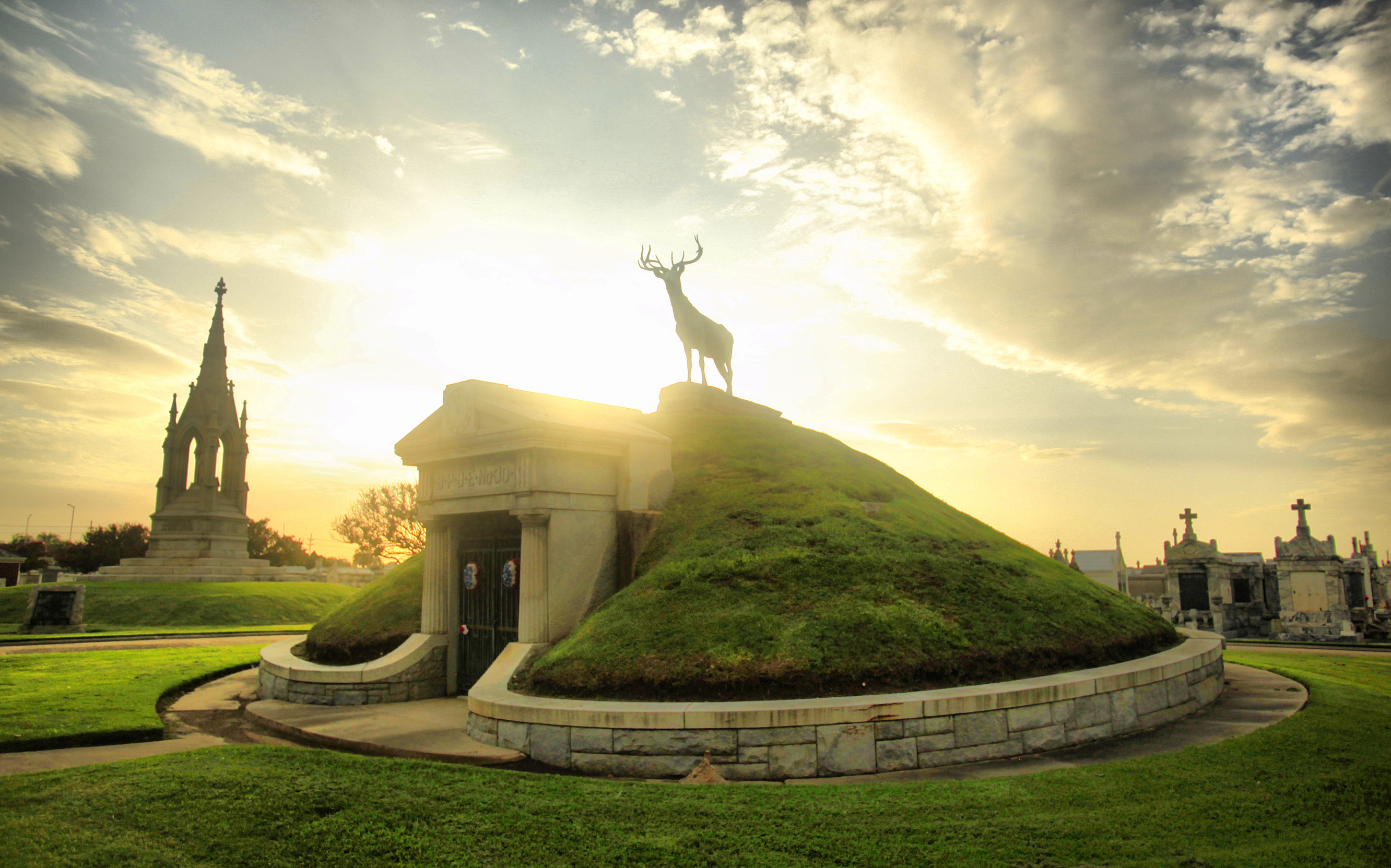
- Front of Greenwood Cemetery with Fireman and Elks tomb monuments in sunset
- Interactive map of Greenwood Cemetery

Details
- Established: 1852
- Location: New Orleans, Louisiana
- Country: United States
- Coordinates: 29°59′03″N 90°06′46″W
- Owned by: Firemen’s Charitable & Benevolent Association (FCBA)
- No. of interments: >100,000
- Website: Official website

Greenwood Cemetery is a historic rural cemetery in New Orleans, Louisiana, United States. The cemetery was opened in 1852, and is located on City Park Avenue (formerly Metairie Road) in the Navarre neighborhood. The cemetery has a number of impressive monuments and sculptures. It is one of a group of historic cemeteries in New Orleans.

== Notable burials ==
=== Military figures and civil war veterans ===
- Tomb of hundreds of unknown Confederate soldiers.
- Confederate Generals Young Marshall Moody (1822–1866), who died of yellow fever, Thomas M. Scott (1828–1876)
- Confederate supporter and resister of Union occupation William Bruce Mumford (1819–1862), who was hanged on June 7 for tearing down a United States flag during Union Army occupation of New Orleans during the American Civil War
- Union Army Brigadier General and Brevet Major General William Plummer Benton (1828–1867), who was Collector of Internal Revenue in the City of New Orleans after the Civil War and died of yellow fever
- There are nine British Commonwealth service personnel, registered by the Commonwealth War Graves Commission, who are buried or specially commemorated here – four from World War I and five from World War II.

=== Athletes ===
- Al Jurisich (1921–1981) MLB pitcher
- Jack Kramer (1918–1995) MLB pitcher
- Joe Martina (1889–1962) MLB pitcher
- George "Bo" Strickland (1926–2010) MLB player, coach, and manager

=== Musicians ===
- Sam Butera (1927–2009), jazz musician
- Nick LaRocca (1889–1961) Jazz musician
- Leon Roppolo (1902–1943) jazz musician
- Thaïs St. Julien (1945–2019) soprano

=== Others ===
- Kate Walker Behan (1851–1918), club leader and Confederate memorial organizer
- Gwen Bristow (1903–1980), journalist and author of Louisiana topics
- Edgar Hull (1904–1984), physician
- Effingham Lawrence (1820–1878) politician who served a single day (March 3, 1875) as a US Congressman
- Valena C. Jones (1872–1917) educator
- A. J. McNamara (1936–2014) US District Court Judge, also served in the Louisiana House of Representatives
- Emile Meyer (1910–1987) actor
- Oramel H. Simpson (1870–1932) governor
- John Kennedy Toole (1937–1969), novelist who wrote A Confederacy of Dunces, a Pulitzer Prize winner

== Gallery ==
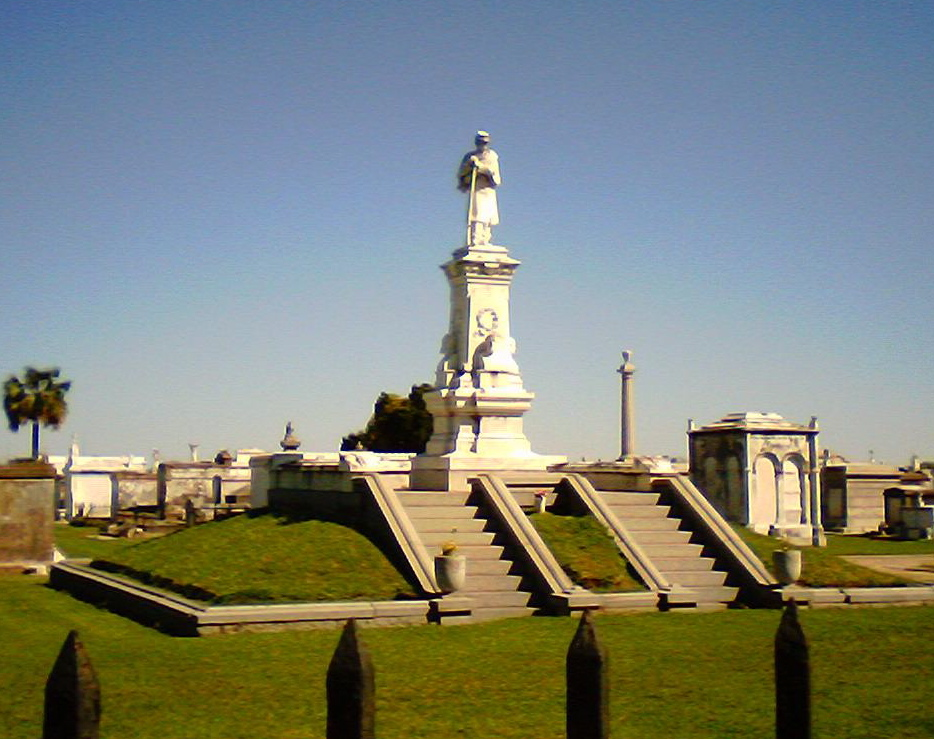
Confederate Tomb, Greenwood Cemetery, New Orleans

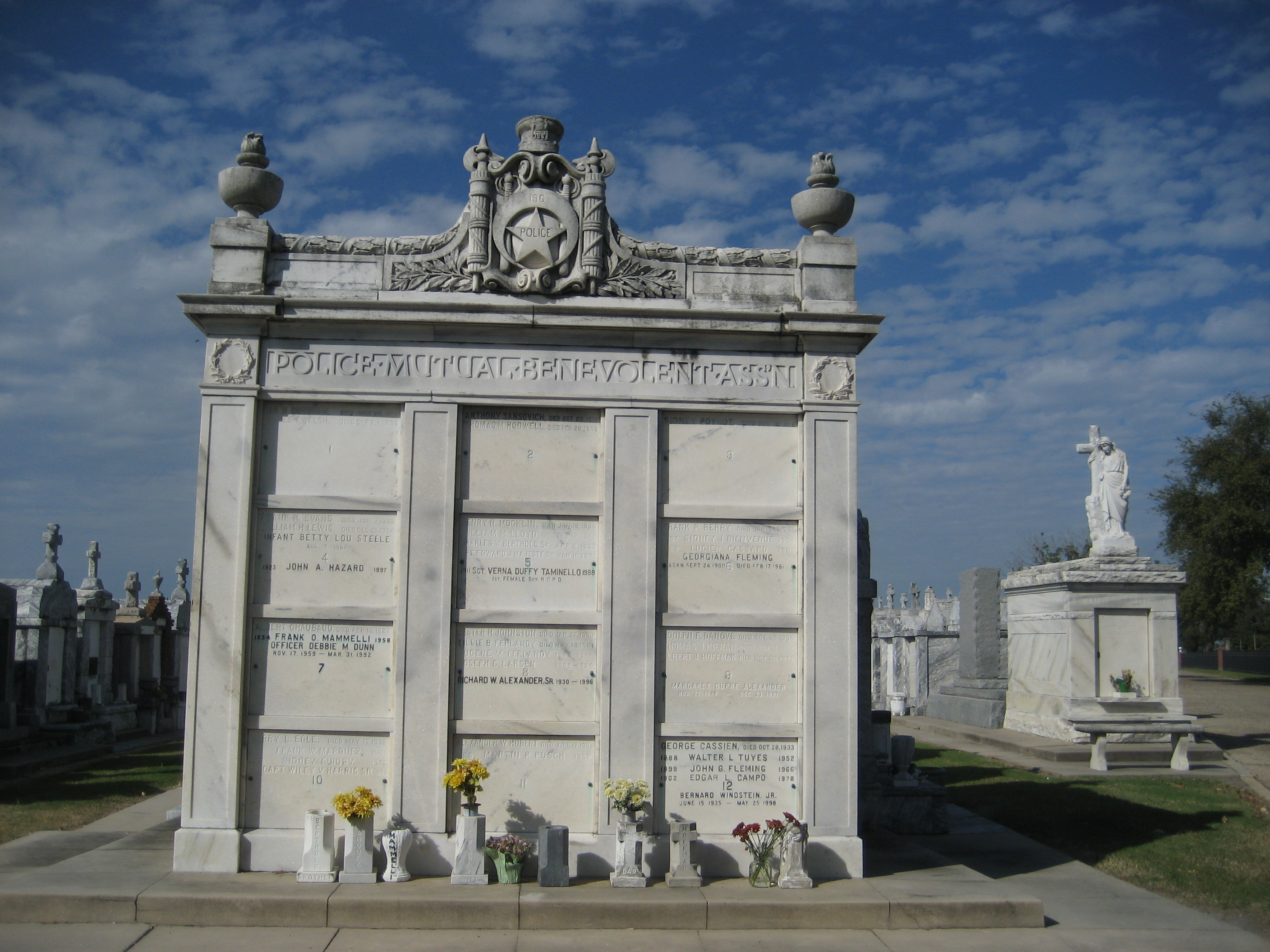
Police Crypt at Greenwood Cemetery

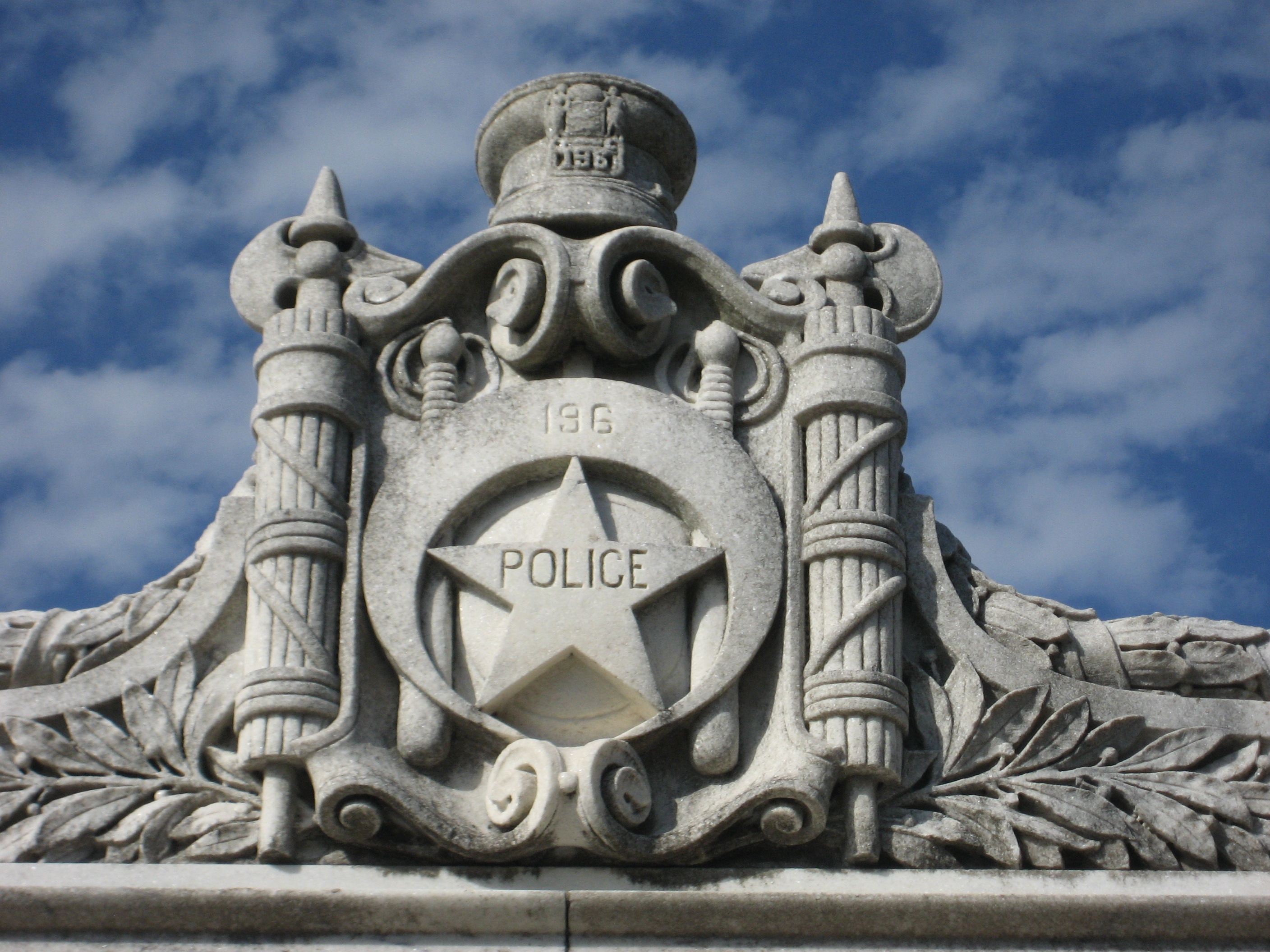
Police Hat on the Police Crypt

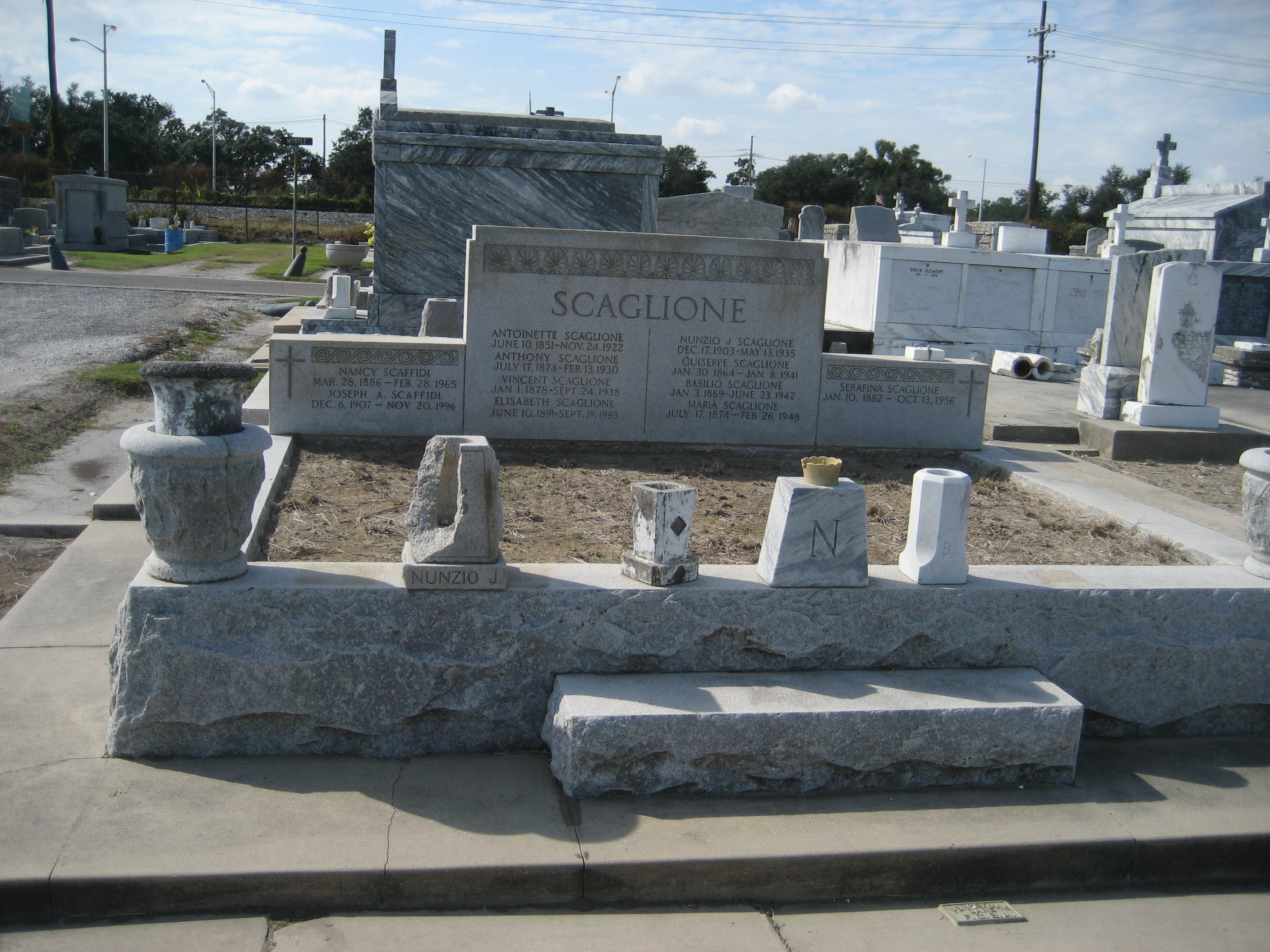
Tomb of jazz musician Nunzio Scaglione

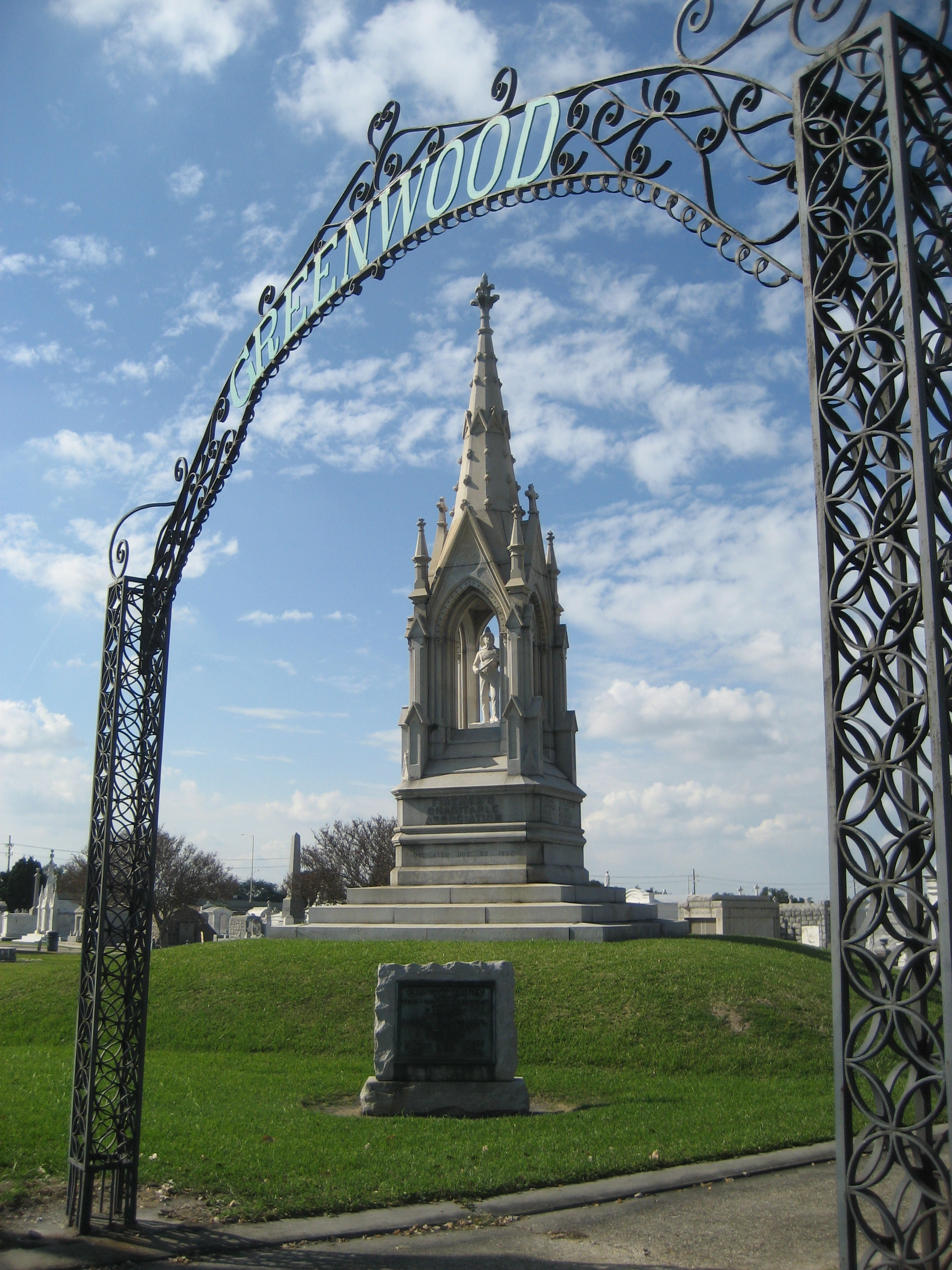
Fireman's Tomb at Greenwood Cemetery

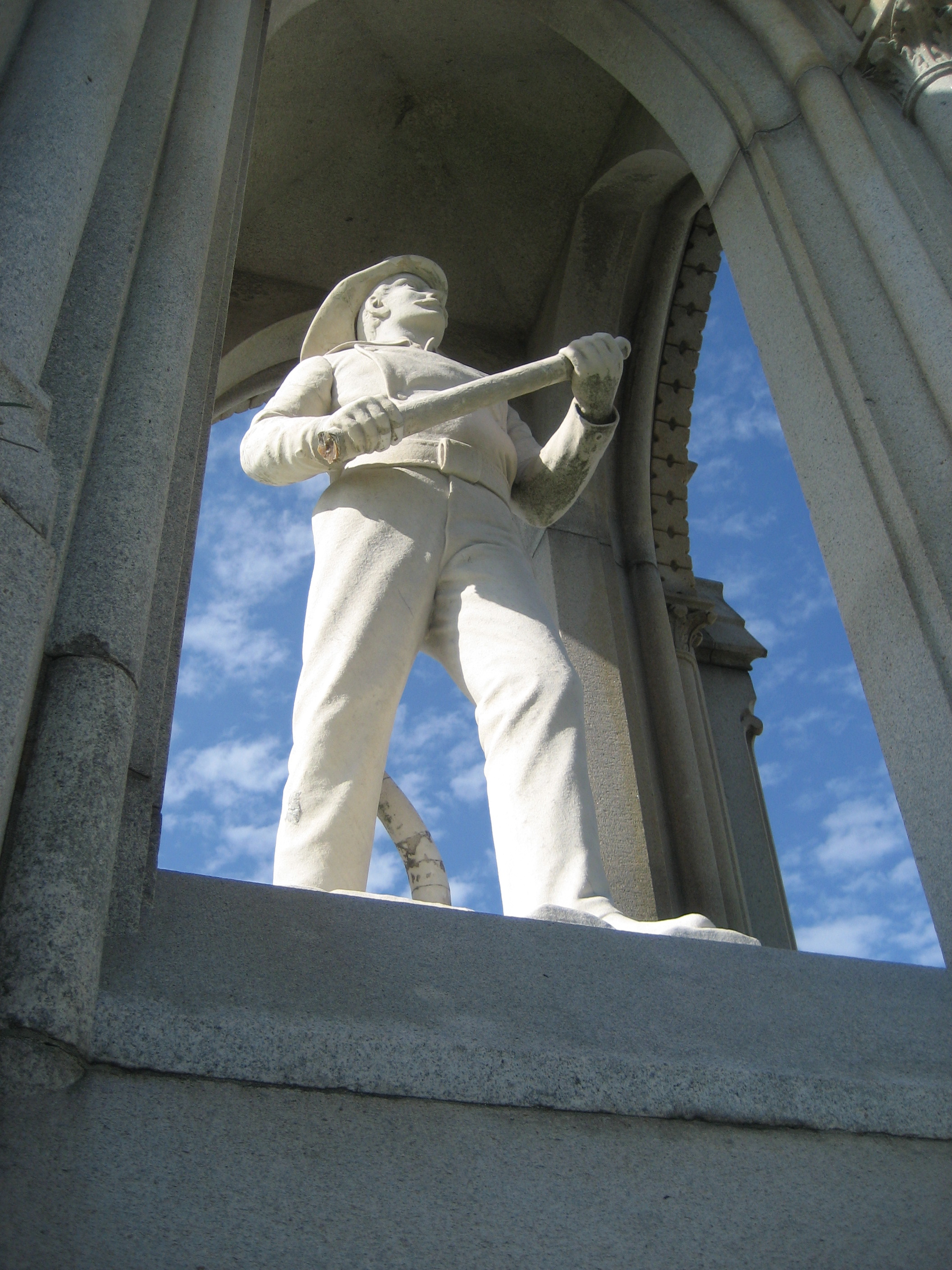
Fireman's Statue at Greenwood Cemetery

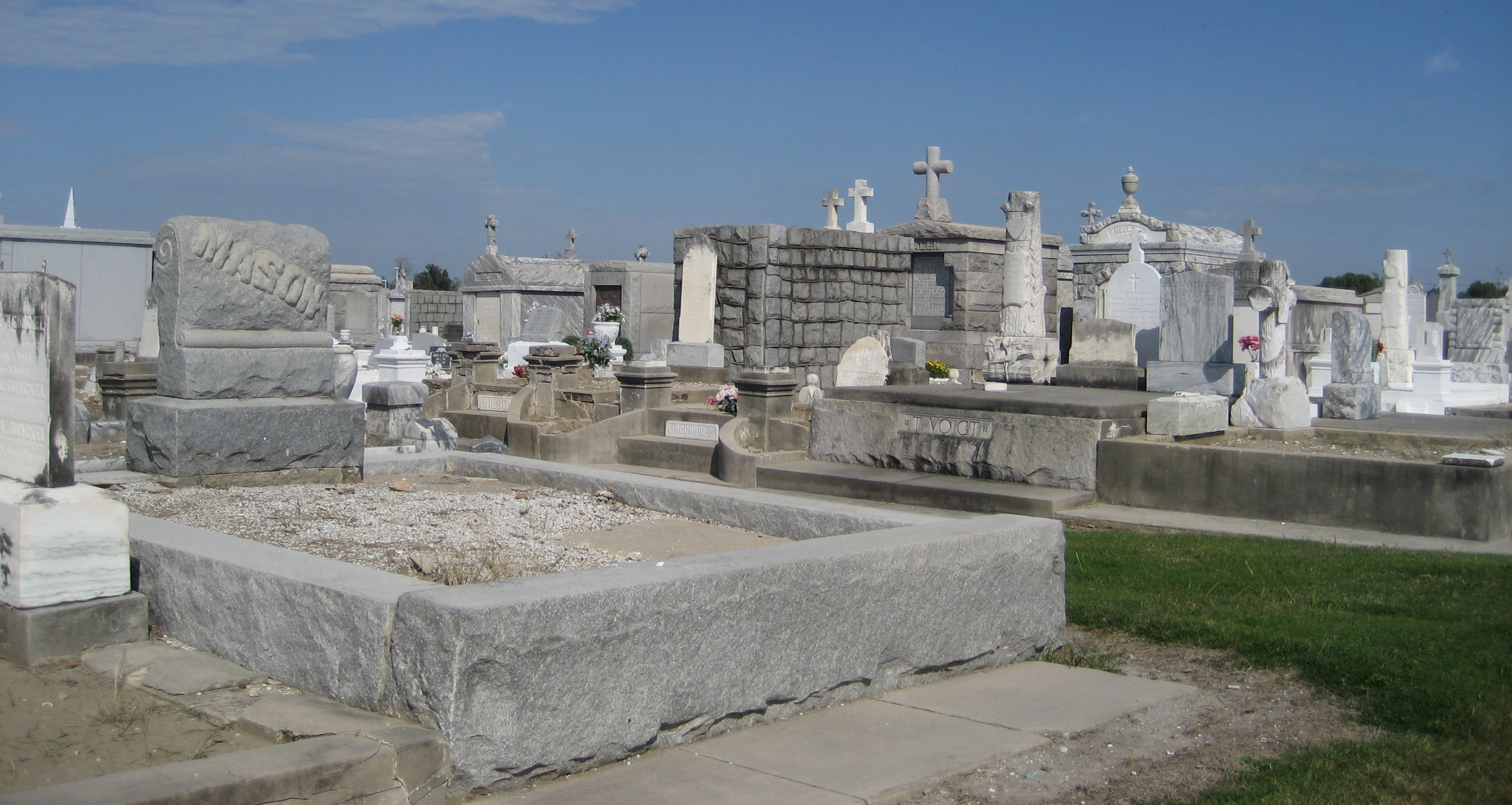
Mason Tomb at Greenwood Cemetery

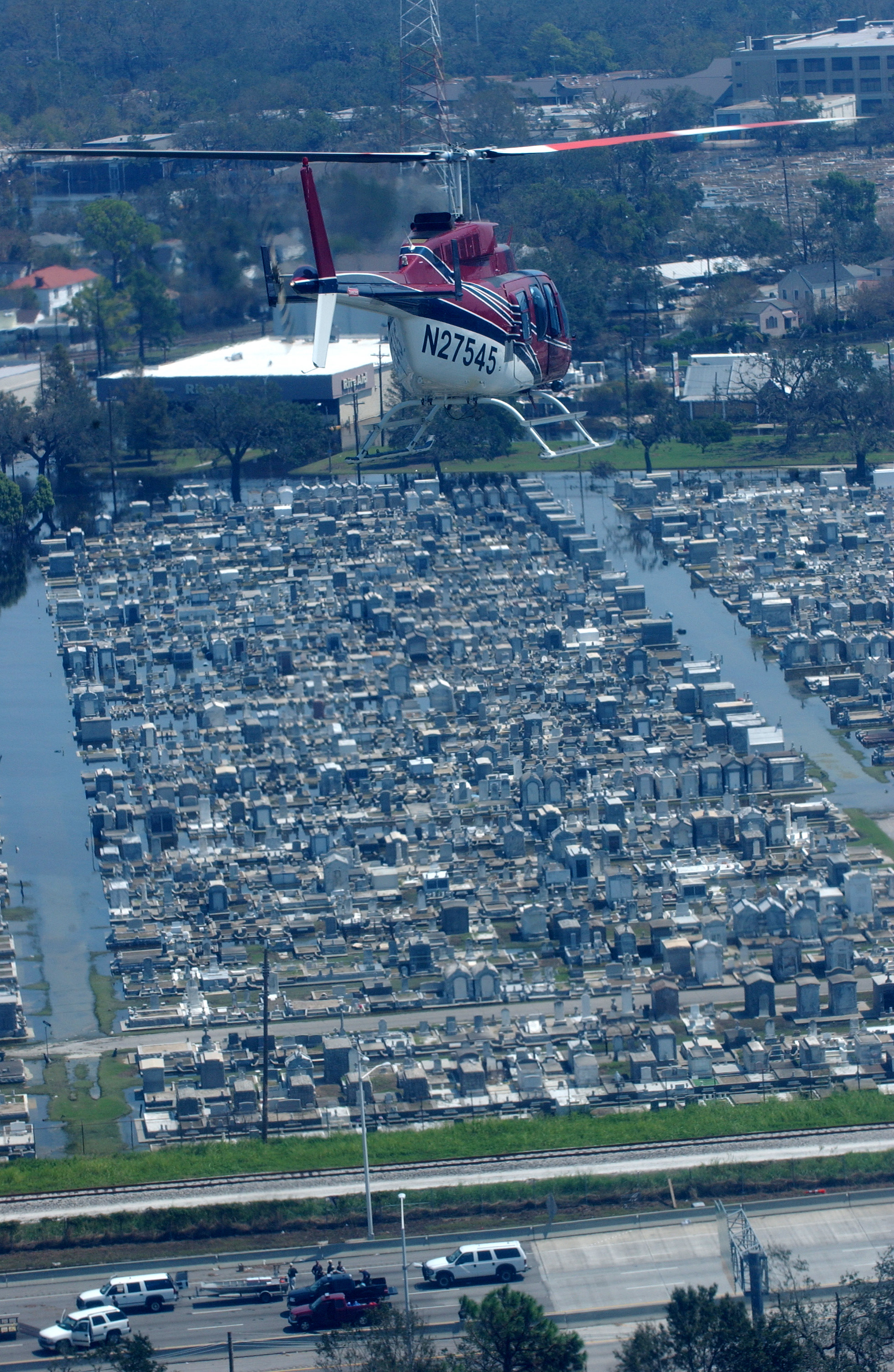
Greenwood Cemetery after Hurricane Katrina (photograph by Jocelyn Augustino)

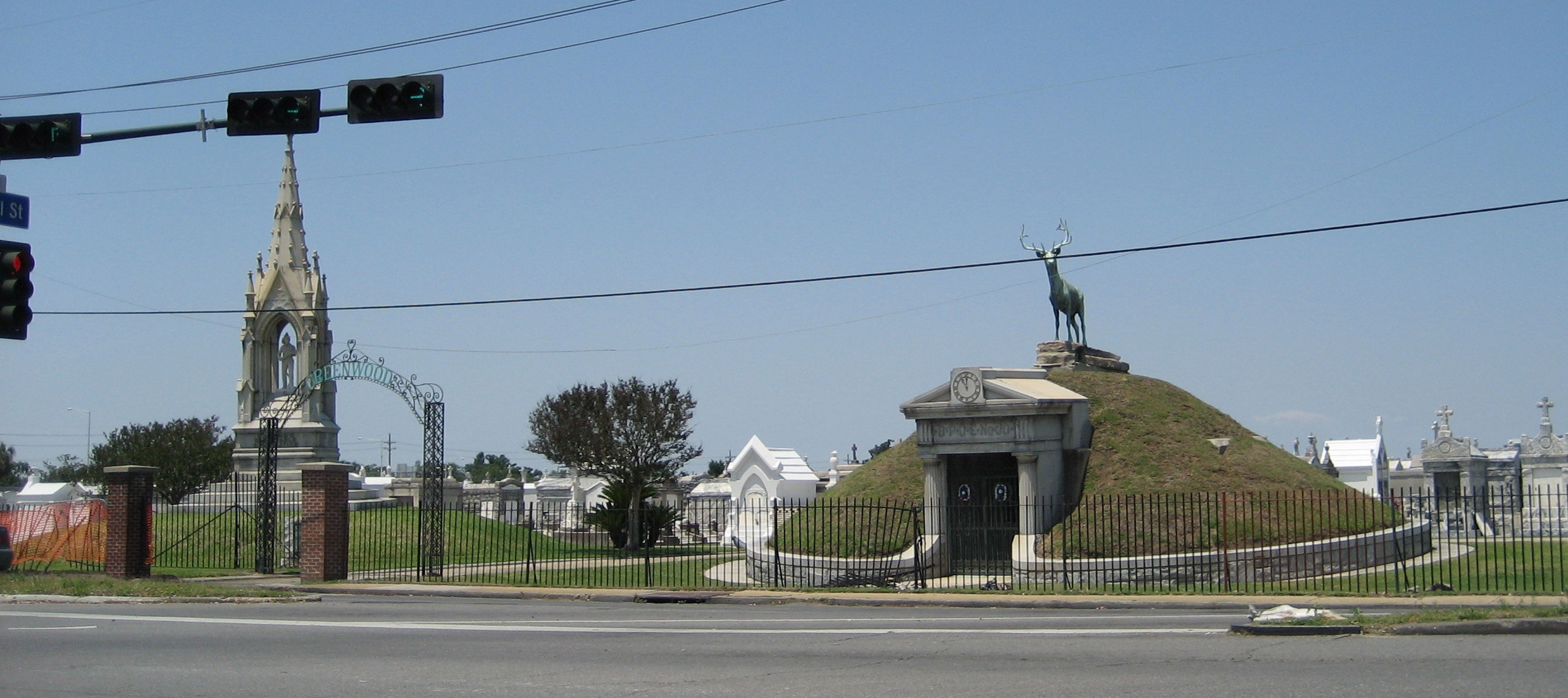
Part of the front of Greenwood, with Fireman and Elks tomb monuments.
