= John McKendree Springer =

American Methodist bishop (1873–1963)

Methodist John McKendree Springer Bishop
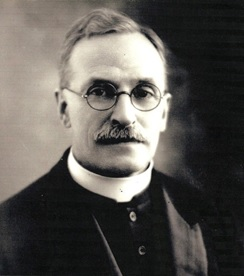
- Elected: 1936

Personal details
- Born: September 7, 1873 Cataract, Wisconsin
- Died: December 2, 1963 (aged 90)
- Buried: Mulungwishi, Katanga Province, DRC
- Denomination: Methodist
- Parents: Rev. Henry Martin Springer
- Spouse: Helen Springer
- Occupation: Methodist pastor and missionary
- Education: Garrett Biblical Institute; Northwestern University; Taylor University
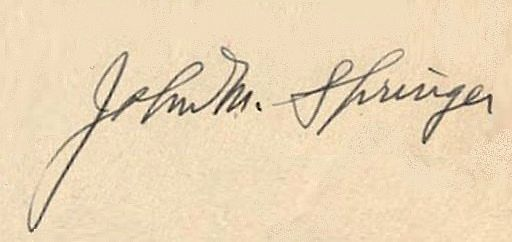
- Signature

John McKendree Springer (7 September 1873 – 2 December 1963) was an American bishop of the Methodist Episcopal Church and The Methodist Church, elected Missionary Bishop for Africa in 1936. He was also a pioneering missionary instrumental in developing Methodism on the continent of Africa. There, he introduced schools which came to be welcomed by many of the tribal chiefs and which the young Africans came to be very fond of. Springer is noted for exploring and journeying 1500 miles across central Africa on foot in 1907, along with his wife Helen.

== Family background ==
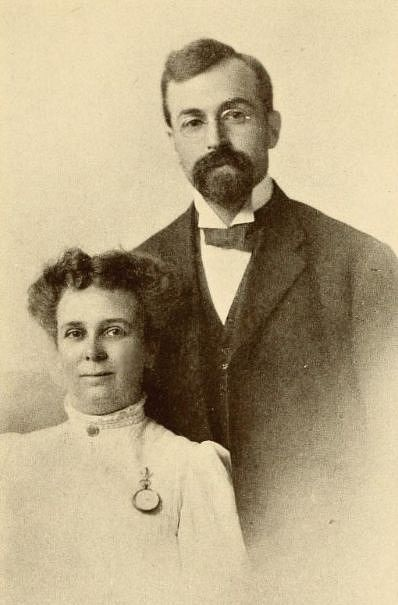
John and Helen Springer in younger years

Springer was born in Cataract, Wisconsin, the son of the Rev. Henry Martin Springer, and the grandson of the Rev. Elihu Springer, both Methodist Episcopal preachers. Elihu was a soldier in the American Indian Wars. Henry served four years with the Colorado cavalry during the American Civil War.

In 1905, John Springer had become mission superintendent of Old Umtali where he married Helen Emily Rasmussen, who also did missionary work in Southern Rhodesia.

After the death of Helen in 1946, Springer married a second Helen, Helen Newton Everett, who did missionary work in the Congo.

On December 1, 1963, Springer died in the Congo and was buried at the United Methodist mission station in Mulungwishi, Katanga Province, DRC.

The Springer family is of Swedish origin. John's mother was descended from the Scarritts family, which was involved in the Indian Missions.

== Education ==
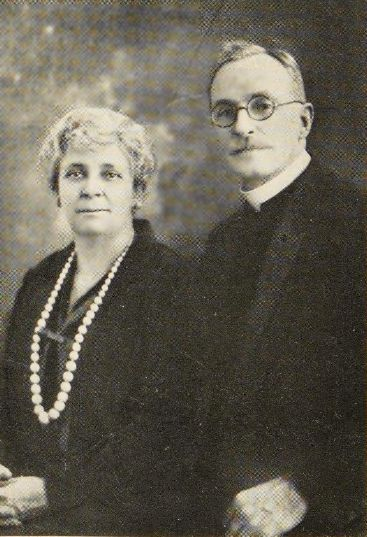
John and Helen Springer

Springer graduated from Northwestern University (1895 and 1899). He earned a B.D. degree from the Garrett Biblical Institute (1901) and Taylor University.

Having performed missionary work in many capacities throughout most of Africa, he authored a number of books about missionary work in Africa during the course of his career. His first wife, Helen, also authored a work about life in Africa, in 1906.

== Missionary service ==
Springer was appointed a missionary in 1901. He was assigned as a pastor and the superintendent of the Old Umtali Industrial Mission in Rhodesia from 1901 until 1906. He and his wife crossed central Africa by foot in 1907, walking approximately 1,500 miles. During their voyage they found accommodations at Cachoa in a house where the explorer and missionary David Livingstone had stayed some years before. He is said to have known Africa as the average man knows his home county. He took furlough from 1907 to 1909. Upon his return to Africa in 1910, he was stationed in the Lunda country of Angola and Belgian Congo. He held various appointments between 1910 and 1915, including Kalalua in North Western Rhodesia (1910–11), Lukoshi in Belgian Congo (1911–13), and Kambove (1913-15). He took a second furlough, from 1915 to 1916.

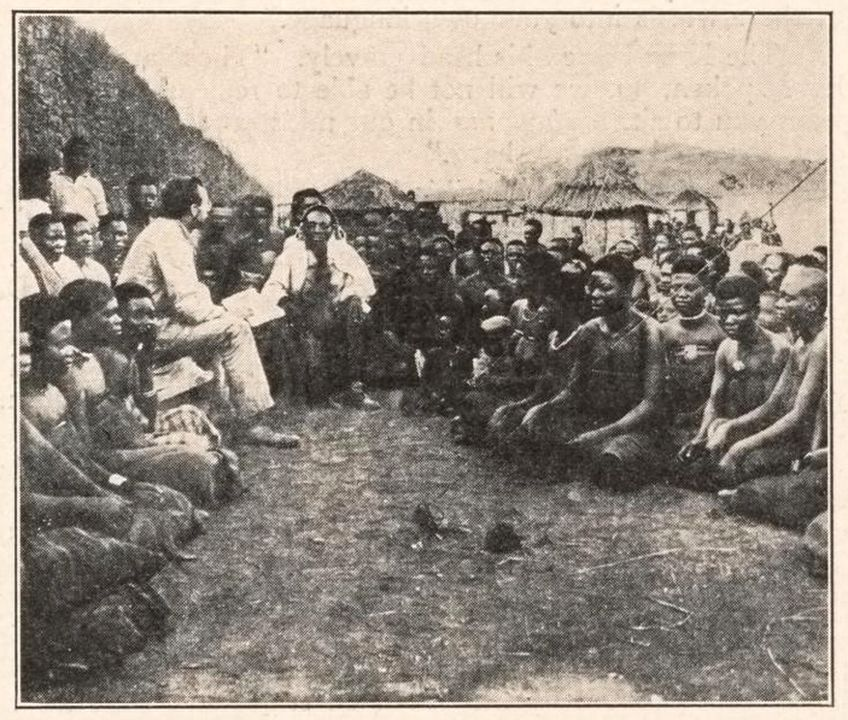
Springer holding service with Mwata Yamvo at Kapanga in 1912

Upon his return to Africa in 1916, Springer became superintendent of the Congo Mission Conference, helping other medical missionaries, such as Dr. Arthur Lewis Piper, get acclimated. He returned to the U.S. in 1918 to work on the Centenary and Inter-Church World Movement projects. In 1920, he was appointed Superintendent of the Elisabethville-Luba District. In 1921, he was transferred to the Rhodesia Mission Conference to serve as Superintendent of the Mutumbara District. Another transfer occurred in 1924, when Springer joined the Congo Mission Conference a second time, again appointed superintendent. During this time he was stationed at Panda-Likasi. A third furlough took place from 1925 to 1928, and he again returned to the U.S. In 1936, he was elected bishop for Africa, serving until his retirement in 1944.

Both John and his wife were gifted and admired orators. They wrote books highlighting the needs and opportunities of Africa. They established the Methodist higher education for many of the African peoples and founded the Congo Institute. His wife Helen translated hymns and scriptures, and established Methodist girls' education. She translated and published a Shona grammar in 1905.

== Works ==
- Springer, John M. (1909). The heart of Central Africa; mineral wealth and missionary opportunity. Cincinnati, Jennings and Graham; New York, Eaton and Mains.
- Springer, Helen (1909). Snap shots from sunny Africa. New York: Katanga Press.
- Springer, John M. (1916). Pioneering in the Congo. New York: Katanga Press.
- —— (1927). Christian conquests in the Congo. The Methodist Book Concern.
- —— (1927). Amos Chimbu : Congo mystic and saint. New York: Board of Foreign Missions].
- ——. The task of tomorrow in Africa. New York: Student Volunteer Movement (year of publication not specified).
- —— (1943). Episcopal address to the Africa Provisional Central Conference of the Methodist Church. Cleveland: Transvaal : Central Mission Press.

== See also ==
- List of bishops of the United Methodist Church
- Joseph Crane Hartzell (1842–1928) — Methodist missionary bishop in Africa
- David Livingstone — Africa explorer and missionary
- Robert Moffat — missionary in South Africa, printed the Bible in 1825 in the native language
- William Taylor (1821–1902) — Methodist missionary bishop in Africa

== Bibliography ==
- Hayes, Mollin (1945). Africa Missionaries : an honor roll of the missionaries of the Methodist Church in [Africa]. New York, NY: Board of Missions and Church Extension, the Methodist Church.
- Springer, John M. (1909). The heart of Central Africa; mineral wealth and missionary opportunity. Cincinnati, Jennings and Graham; New York, Eaton and Mains.
- Springer, Helen (1909). Snap shots from sunny Africa. New York: Katanga Press.
- Robert, Dana L. (2005). Yrogoyen, Charles Jr.; Warrick, Susan E. (eds.). Historical dictionary of Methodism. Lanham, Md.: Scarecrow Press. ISBN 978-0-81087-8945.
- "Bishop John McKendree Springer". United Methodist Communications. 2024.
- Papers of Bishop John McKendree Springer, 'General Commission on Archives and History of The United Methodist Church' (Madison, New Jersey).
