= Harold Robert Perry =

American Catholic bishop (1916–1991)

Harold Robert Perry S.V.D.
- Auxiliary Bishop of New Orleans
- Archdiocese: New Orleans
- Appointed: September 29, 1965
- In office: 1965–1991

Orders
- Ordination: January 6, 1944 by Richard Oliver Gerow
- Consecration: January 6, 1966 by Egidio Vagnozzi

Personal details
- Born: October 9, 1916 Lake Charles, Louisiana, U.S.
- Died: July 17, 1991 (aged 74)
- Denomination: Catholic
- Parents: Frank J. and Josephine Perry
- Education: Divine Word Seminary

Harold Robert Perry, S.V.D. (October 9, 1916 – July 17, 1991) was an American Catholic prelate who served as an auxiliary bishop for the Archdiocese of New Orleans from 1966 to 1991. He was the first openly African-American Catholic bishop, the second overall, and the first since 1875.

A member of the Society of the Divine Word, Perry was also the first Black male provincial superior in the United States, and the first African-American clergyman to deliver the opening prayer in Congress.

== Biography ==
=== Early life and education ===
Harold Perry was born in Lake Charles, Louisiana, to Frank J. Perry, a rice mill worker, and his wife Josephine, a domestic cook. The eldest of six children, he was raised in a devoutly Catholic and French-speaking home. His cousin Louis V. Ledoux would become the first Black diocesan priest in the Deep South. At age 13, Perry entered St. Augustine Seminary in Bay St. Louis, Mississippi, the Black seminary of the Society of the Divine Word. He continued his studies at ecclesiastical institutions in Illinois and Wisconsin. In 1938, he took vows as a member of the order.

=== Early priesthood ===
On January 6, 1944, Perry was ordained to the priesthood. He was the 26th African American to become a Catholic priest. He then served as assistant pastor at Immaculate Heart of Mary Church in Lafayette until 1948, when he was transferred to Notre Dame Church in St. Martinville. He served at St. Peter's Church in Pine Bluff, Arkansas, (1949–1951) and at St. Gabriel's Church in Mound Bayou, Mississippi, (1951–52) before returning to Louisiana as founding pastor of St. Joseph's Church in Broussard. During his six years as pastor there, he built the church, rectory and school.

In 1958, Perry was named rector of his alma mater, St. Augustine Seminary in Bay St. Louis. Becoming more active in the civil rights movement, he joined the National Catholic Council for Interracial Justice upon its founding in 1960. Writing in the Catholic monthly Interracial Review in 1961, Perry said:

Catholic institutions could have won great respect among Southern Negroes if they had dropped segregation long ago. In many instances, segregation continues up to and including the Communion rail. We have missed a real opportunity to impress the Negro with the true attitude of the church.

In 1963, he and other religious leaders were invited to the White House to discuss peaceful desegregation with President John F. Kennedy. Perry's tenure as rector came to an end in 1964, when he became provincial superior of the Southern province of the Divine Word Society in the United States. That same year, he also became the first African-American clergyman to deliver the opening prayer in Congress.

=== Episcopacy ===
On September 29, 1965, Perry was appointed titular bishop of Mons in Mauretania and auxiliary bishop of the Archdiocese of New Orleans by Pope Paul VI. He was the second-ever African American to become a Catholic bishop. Announcing Perry's appointment, Archbishop Philip Hannan said, "We welcome the first American-born Negro bishop." However, Bishop James Healy, the son of a white plantation owner and a biracial slave, holds the distinction of being the first African American to be elevated to the Catholic episcopate.

Perry's appointment was praised by many civil and religious leaders, including President Lyndon B. Johnson, whom Perry credited as having "accomplished more for our own people than any President since Lincoln". However, Perry declared, "My appointment is a religious one, not a civil rights appointment. My religious work comes first. I have no desire to work directly as a civil rights leader." He received his episcopal consecration on January 6, 1966, from Archbishop Egidio Vagnozzi, with Archbishops Philip Hannan and John Cody serving as co-consecrators. White protestors held a demonstration outside his consecration, and one woman described it as "another reason why God will destroy the Vatican".

As an auxiliary bishop, Perry served as pastor of Our Lady of Lourdes Church and St. Theresa of the Child Jesus Church in New Orleans, vicar general of the archdiocese, and rector of the National Shrine of Our Lady of Prompt Succor. He lived in the rectory on the grounds of Ursuline Academy, the oldest girls' school in the United States. For many years he also served as national chaplain of the Knights of Peter Claver.

=== Death ===
He remained an auxiliary bishop until his death at the age of 74, due to complications of Alzheimer's disease at Wynhoven Health Care Center. Upon his death, Archbishop Francis B. Schulte said, "As the first African-American bishop in this century, [Bishop Perry] was a symbol of the great changes which have taken place in our church and in our country."

== See also ==
Catholic Church titles
Preceded by –	Auxiliary Bishop of New Orleans; 1965–1991	Succeeded by –
