= Joseph Crane Hartzell =

American Missionary Bishop

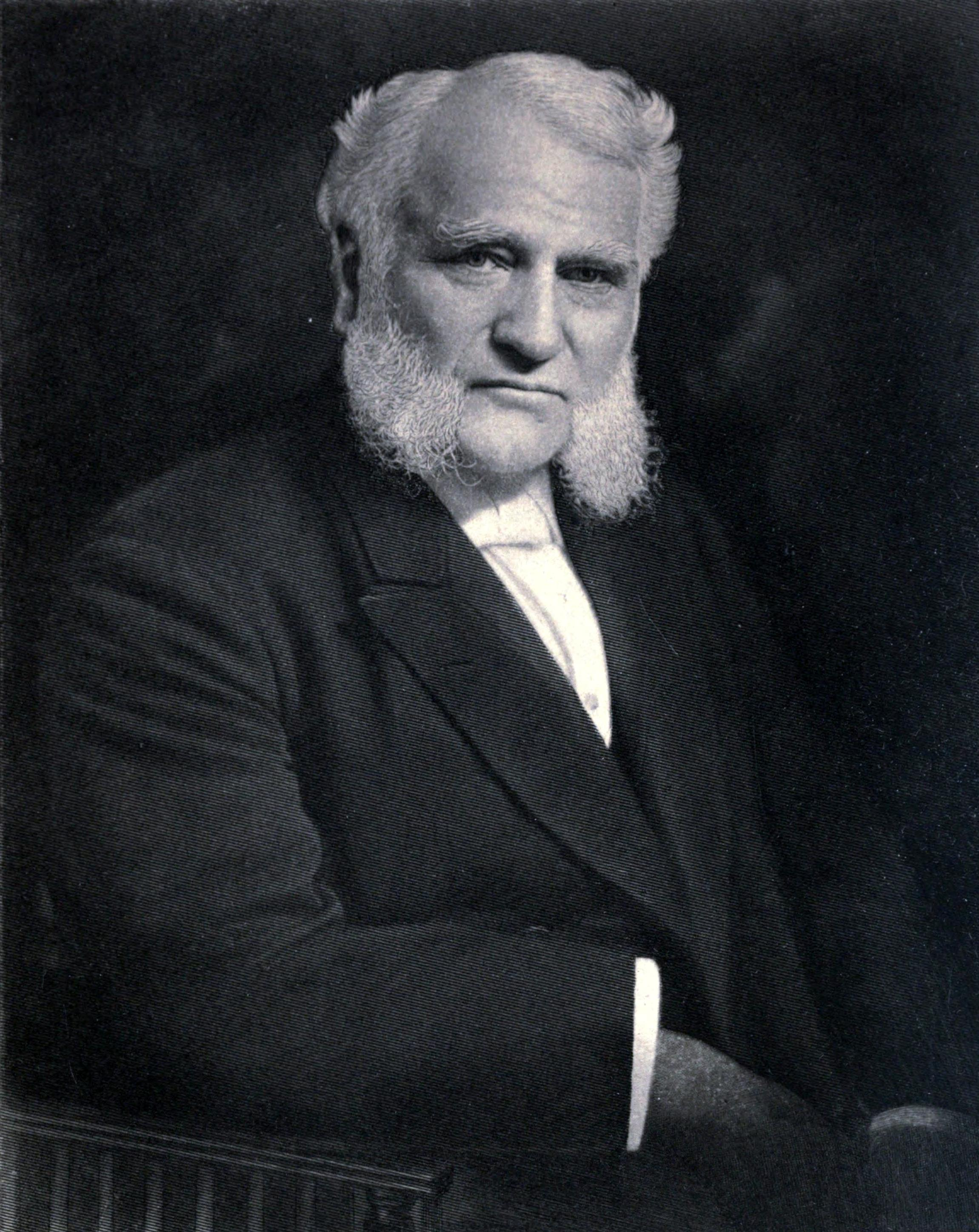
- Born: June 1, 1842; Moline, Illinois
- Died: September 6, 1928 (aged 86); Blue Ash, Ohio
- Resting place: Rosehill Cemetery

Signature
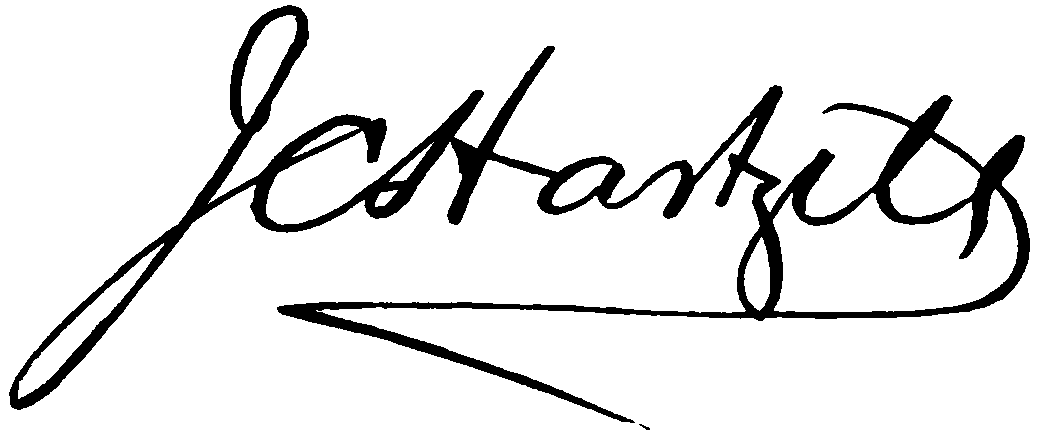

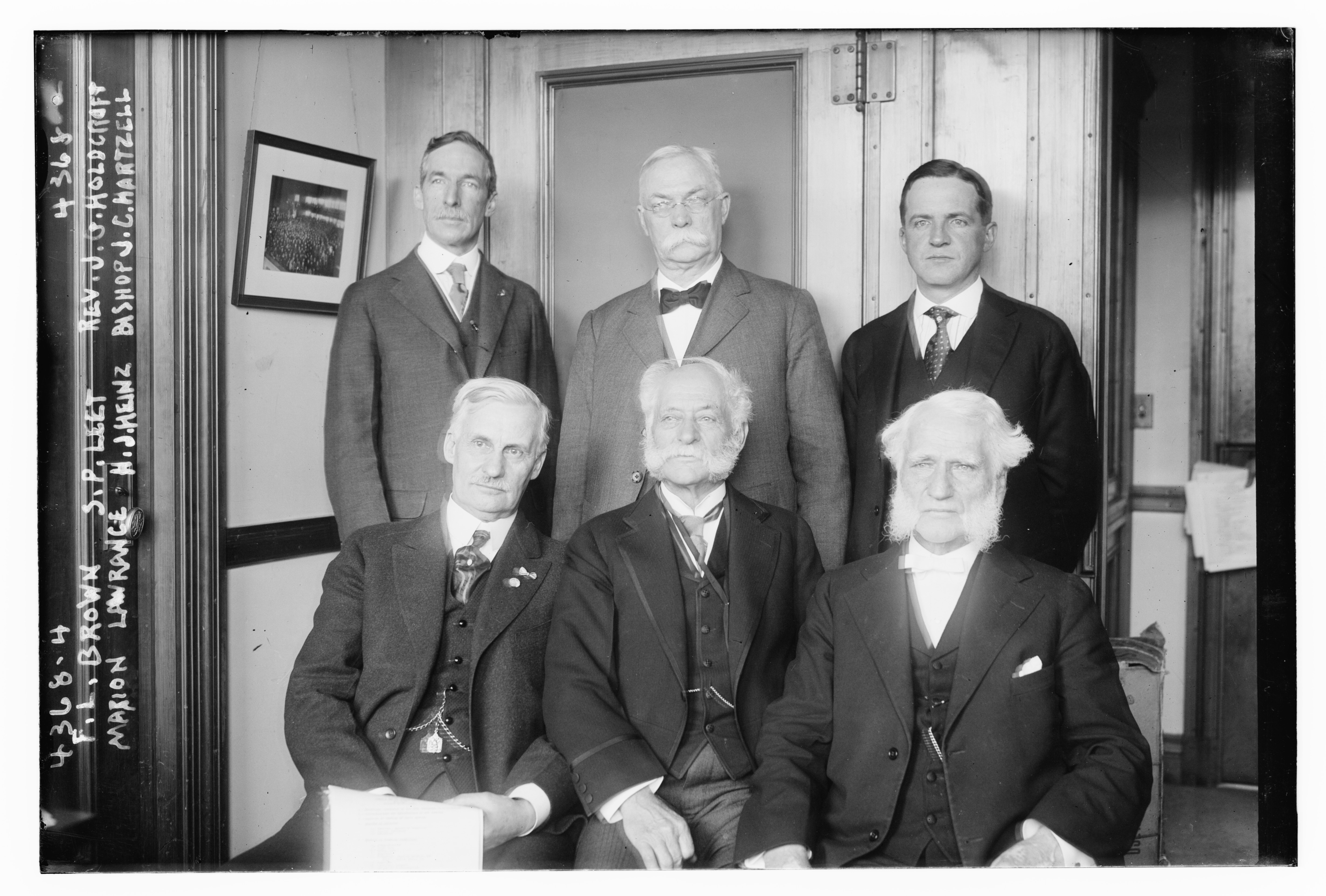
Frank L. Brown, Seth Penn Leet (1851-?), Reverend James Gordon Holdcroft, Marion Lawrence, Henry John Heinz, and Bishop Joseph Crane Hartzell in 1917

Joseph Crane Hartzell (June 1, 1842 – September 6, 1928) was an American Missionary Bishop of the Methodist Episcopal Church who served in the United States and in Africa. Hartzell's missionary work included presiding over four Annual Sessions of the Liberia Annual Conference, organizing the Congo Mission Conference and presiding over the first sessions of the East Central Africa and West Central Africa Mission Conferences for which he was made a Knight Commander of the Order for the Redemption of Africa.

== Early life and family ==
Joseph was born to Methodist parents, Michael and Nancy, on a farm near Moline, Illinois. He was converted to the Christian faith as a boy. In 1863 he rescued four men from drowning in Lake Michigan and was honored by the City of Evanston, Illinois, for his heroism. In 1869 Joseph married Miss Jennie Culver of Chicago.

Joseph earned his own education, entering upon an eleven years' course of study at the age of sixteen. He earned a B.D. degree in 1868 from Garrett Biblical Institute. Prior to this, he had received a B.A. degree from Illinois Wesleyan University. Illinois Wesleyan and Allegheny College both granted him the honorary degree of D.D. in 1875. He taught school for a period of time in the early and mid-1860s, before entering the ministry.

== Ordained ministry ==
The Rev. Hartzell entered the Central Illinois Annual Conference in the fall of 1866, being appointed pastor of Pekin and Bloomington. In February 1870 he transferred to the Louisiana Annual Conference of the M.E. Church. He served for three years at Ames Chapel (later the St. Charles Avenue Methodist Church) in New Orleans. This was the only Methodist church in New Orleans to remain with the northern branch of the Church after the division over slavery in 1844. During the next nine years, Rev. Hartzell served as the Presiding Elder of various districts in the Louisiana Conference. For several years he also was a prominent member of the New Orleans School Board.

In 1873 Rev. Hartzell began publication of The Southwestern Christian Advocate, which he carried as a private enterprise until its adoption as an official paper of the M.E. Church by the 1876 General Conference. He was editor of this paper until February 1881, when he resigned to become the Assistant Secretary of the Freedmen's Aid Society. At a General Conference he was elected Corresponding Secretary of the Freedmen's Aid and Southern Education Society, to which office he was re-elected by the 1892 General Conference.

In 1874, Hartzell formally supported the ordination of a woman, Maggie Newton Van Cott, to preach in the Methodist Church.

At the same time, Jennie Hartzell was working with the Freedwomen’s Aid Society and was an advocate for the education and training of African-American girls, publishing a book on the subject.

== Episcopal ministry ==
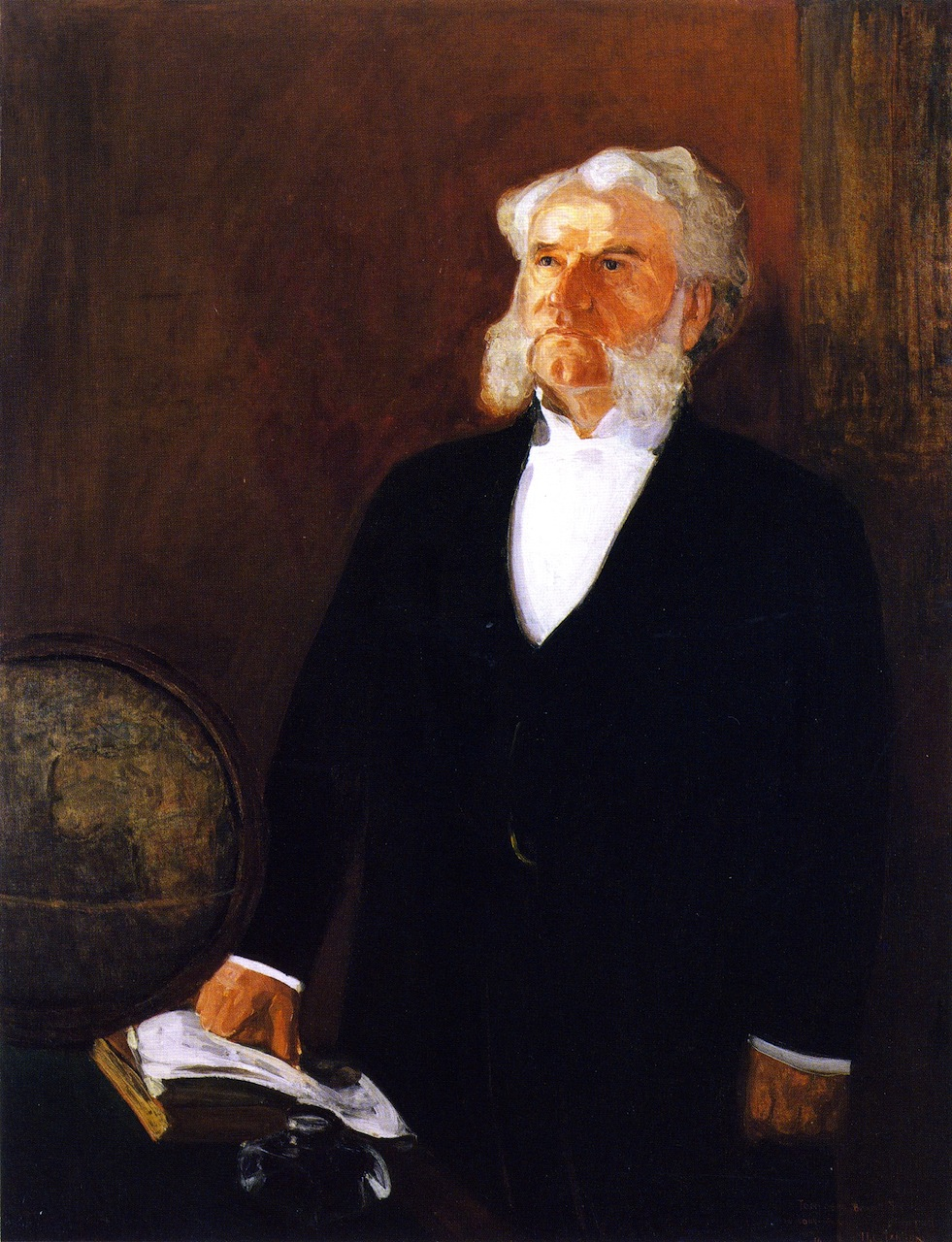
Bishop Joseph Crane Hartzell, by Henry Ossawa Tanner. Hartzell and his wife helped Tanner get started in his artistic path by sponsoring his trip to France, buying his paintings.

When the retirement of Bishop William Taylor made necessary a successor, the 1896 General Conference elected Dr. Hartzell Missionary Bishop for Africa. For the next four years, Bishop Hartzell traveled 70,000 miles (110,000 km) performing the duties of his office. He presided over four Annual Sessions of the Liberia Annual Conference. On July 9, 1897, he organized the Congo Mission Conference. He also laid the foundations of the Mission in New and Old Umtali in Manicaland. He received, as donations from the British South Africa Company, valuable lots in New Umtali. These came with appropriations of funds for the maintenance of a school among Europeans, and a tract of several thousand acres with twelve buildings (worth over $100,000 at that time) at Old Umtali, for the establishment of an industrial Mission.

Bishop Hartzell held the first sessions of the East Central Africa and West Central Africa Mission Conferences, where were each formed in 1901 from the Congo Mission Conference. He dedicated the St. Andrew's M.E. Church September 20, 1903, the first Methodist Episcopal Church erected for the use of white people in Africa. In the spring of 1910, Bishop Hartzell organized the American Mission in North Africa.

For his service in Africa Bishop Hartzell was made a Knight Commander of the Order for the Redemption of Africa by the Republic of Liberia. He retired at the 1916 General Conference.

Bishop Hartzell died September 6, 1928, as a result of injuries sustained during a robbery at his home in Blue Ash, Ohio. He was 86. He was buried in Rosehill Cemetery in Chicago. Jennie had died in 1916.

== Legacy ==
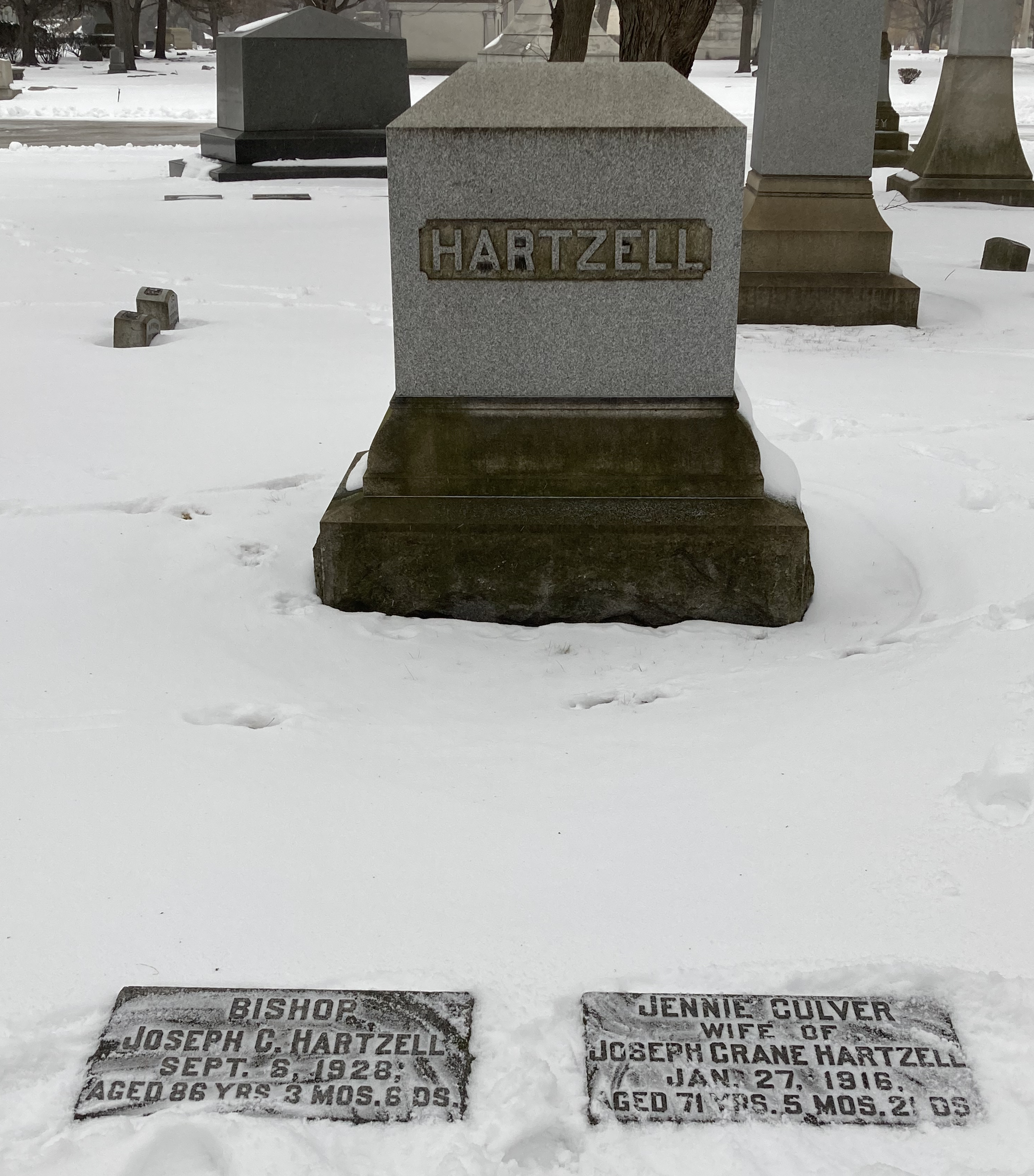
Hartzell's grave at Rosehill Cemetery, Chicago

Hartzell Hall at Dillard University in New Orleans, Louisiana, is named in his honor. Hartzell United Methodist Church, in Cincinnati, Ohio, and Hartzell High School, in Mutare, Zimbabwe are also named in his honor. Located 2.5 miles from Bishop Hartzell's home in Blue Ash, the church maintains a number of artifacts related to the Bishop's life as donated by his family. Hartzell Memorial United Methodist Church in Hickory, NC is also named in his honor, as is Hartzell Street in Evanston, Illinois.

== Selected writings ==
- Comp. and edited, Christian Educators in Council, record of two important educational conventions, organized by Bishop Hartzell, who gave three addresses: The Freedmen Progressing, The Methodist Episcopal Church in the South Since the War, and a brief farewell word. Published, 1883.
- Address: Christian Work in Agricultural Districts, Second Ecumenical Conference, Washington, 1891.
- Address: The Open Door in Africa, First General Missionary Convention, Cleveland, 1903, also a pamphlet.
- Introduction, Springer, J.M., Heart of Central Africa, 1908.
- Minutes of African Mission Conferences presented to the General Conference, 1908. Autographed by Bishop Hartzell, in the Methodist Bishops' Collection at the library of Perkins School of Theology, Southern Methodist University.
- Africa Diamond Jubilee Documents, Forward Movements, The Africa Mission, Diamond Investments in Africa, 1908–1909.
- Unification and Minorities, leaflet, n.d., in the Methodist Bishops' Collection.

== Biographies ==
- Poem, Williams, Dwight, Wreck of the Schooner "Storm," 1891, in the Methodist Bishops' Collection at the library of Perkins School of Theology, Southern Methodist University.
- Account of youthful heroism of Joseph C. Hartzell in 1863 in saving four lives from a wreck on Lake Michigan, in the Methodist Bishops' Collection at the library of Perkins School of Theology, Southern Methodist University.

== See also ==
- John McKendree Springer (1873–1963) — Methodist missionary Bishop in the Congo
- Robert Moffat (missionary), Missionary in Africa
- William Taylor (missionary), Missionary in Africa
- Alexander Murdoch Mackay (1849–1890) — 19th century missionary in Uganda
- List of bishops of the United Methodist Church

== Archive ==
- Joseph C. Hartzell Papers, Mss. 506, Louisiana and Lower Mississippi Valley Collections, LSU Libraries, Baton Rouge, La.
