= St. Augustine Seminary (Bay St. Louis) =

American Catholic seminary (1920–1982)

- Former name: Sacred Heart College
- Type: Private
- Active: 1920–1982
- Founder: Matthew Christman
- Religious affiliation: Divine Word Missionaries
- Location: Bay St. Louis, Mississippi, 39520, United States; 30.31721956387°N 89.331133307718°W
- Language: English

St. Augustine Seminary, originally named Sacred Heart College, was a Black Catholic seminary run by the Society of the Divine Word in Bay St. Louis, Mississippi. Founded in 1920 in Greenville at Sacred Heart Catholic Church, it relocated in 1923 was the first seminary intended to educate African Americans for the priesthood.

Started by Fr Matthew Christman, SVD during the era of Jim Crow and widespread opposition to the idea of Black Catholic priests in the United States, the school educated and ordained many of the first Black priests in the United States. It eventually integrated as tensions eased somewhat in the Church, and closed for higher studies in 1967. It remained a high school seminary and novitiate house until 1982.

== History ==
=== Background and founding ===
The idea for an all-Black seminary dated back to the early 19th century, when various bishops saw the need for ministry to African Americans, especially following the Civil War. The climate of racism, which was displayed even among the bishops themselves, was such that the only Black priests ordained before the late 19th century were the Healy brothers, all of whom passed for White during their ministries. As a result, most US seminaries remained closed to Black applicants through the mid 20th century.

The Society of the Divine Word, a Dutch congregation founded by Fr Arnold Janssen, had arrived in America in 1895 when Brother Wendelin Meyer arrived to sell SVD publications. Several more members followed, and by 1897 they had established operations in Techny, Illinois. In 1905, the order arrived in the Deep South among African Americans. At the time, African-American men were barred from all but two US seminaries (those of the Josephites) and only a few had been ordained, almost all overseas. The Josephites would also soon shut down Black vocations in their society following early struggles involving their early Black members.

By 1920, The Divine Word Fathers had gained the support and funds necessary to establish a seminary of their own for African Americans, which originally began at the order's Sacred Heart Catholic Church in Greenville, Mississippi. It was named Sacred Heart College and founded as a parochial school in 1913, before officially becoming a minor seminary. It was separated from the high school and moved to Bay St. Louis in 1923 to be closer to a large city and avoid harassment from the Ku Klux Klan.

=== Vocations ===
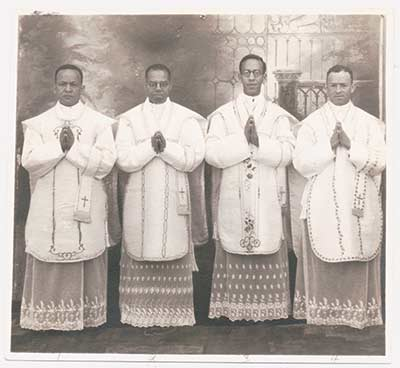
SVD Fathers and St Augustine graduates Vincent Smith, Francis Wade, Maurice Rousseve and Anthony Bourges

Its first students included some of the first Black men ever to study in a Catholic seminary in the United States, and its first ordination class in 1934 included four well-received Black priests. In the following years, it educated many of the nation's African American priests, as most US seminaries remained closed to Blacks through the mid to late 20th century.

As such, nearly all of the first openly Black Catholic bishops in the US came from the SVD ranks and studied at St. Augustine, as did the first Black bishop educated stateside, the Dominican prelate Joseph O. Bowers. The first African-American Catholic bishop since 1875 was St. Augustine grad Harold R. Perry.

=== Integration and closure ===
The seminary continued operations as an all-Black seminary for a number of years, before integrating in the mid 20th century. As more seminaries began to accept Black men into formation in the United States, including the Josephites' formerly integrated institutions, St. Augustine's exclusive hold on Black male vocations waned. The seminary closed for higher studies in 1967, and became a high school seminary before closing 15 years later.

American SVD seminarians now study at Divine Word College in Epworth, Iowa and St. Augustine Seminary now serves as a retreat center for the SVD's southern province. It also serves as the headquarters of In a Word, the province's periodical on African-American Catholic news.

== Buildings ==
St Augustine Seminary
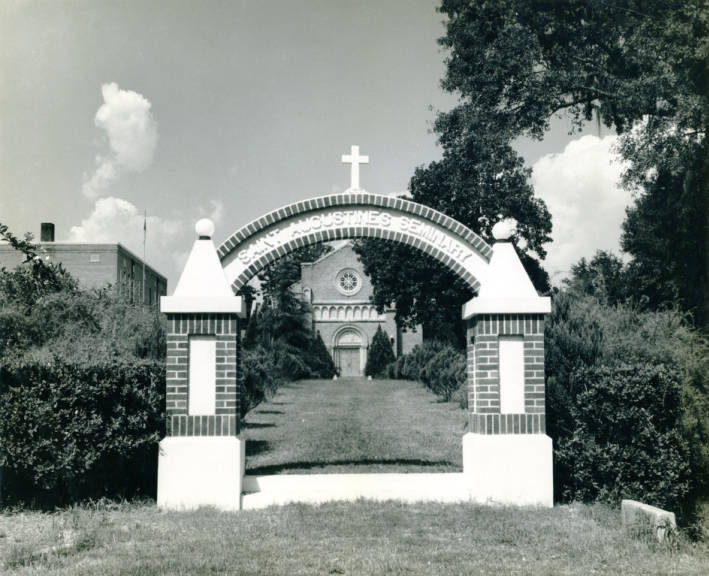
- Entrance to St. Augustine Seminary in Bay St. Louis, Mississippi.

Religion
- Affiliation: Catholic Church
- Rite: Latin Church
- Ecclesiastical or organisational status: Defunct
- Ownership: Society of the Divine Word
- Year consecrated: 1920

Location
- Location: Bay St. Louis, Mississippi
- Country: United States
- Interactive map of St Augustine Seminary

Architecture
- Established: 1920

=== Lourdes Grotto ===
On the seminary property stands a Marian grotto dedicated to Our Lady of Lourdes, a French apparition from the 19th century. The grotto is open to the public by appointment and has become a minor tourist attraction.

=== National Register of Historic Places ===
The Divine Word Chapel of the former seminary is a contributing property in the Old Bay St. Louis Historic District, listed on the National Register of Historic Places in 2010, as are two other buildings on the property, including an Agony Grotto and Sacred Heart Shrine.

== Notable alumni ==
- Harold Robert Perry
- Joseph Oliver Bowers
- Dominic Carmon
- Leonard Olivier
- Joseph Abel Francis
- Raymond Caesar
- J. Terry Steib
- Curtis J. Guillory

== See also ==
- Black Catholicism
- Society of the Divine Word
- St. Joseph's Seminary (Washington, DC)
- St. Anthony's Mission House
