= Arthur Lewis Piper =

American missionary in the Belgian Congo

Personal life
- Born: December 31, 1883 Knapp's Corner, Pennsylvania, USA
- Died: 1971 (aged 87–88) Tampa, Florida, USA
- Spouse: Maude E. Garret (m. 1913)
- Children: 2
- Education: University of Buffalo Medical School; White's Bible School; Post Graduate Hospital; London School of Tropical Medicine

Religious life
- Religion: Christianity
- Denomination: Methodist Episcopal Church
- Institute: Epworth League

Arthur Lewis Piper (December 31, 1883 – 1971) was a medical missionary in the Belgian Congo, supported by the Detroit Epworth League. He worked for the Mission Conference of the Methodist Episcopal Church in the most remote mission station near Kapanga in the Belgian Congo. Piper helped the Lunda tribe battle malaria, sleeping sickness, and leprosy, among many other diseases.

In 1925, he encouraged use of tryparsamide to cure sleeping sickness. The drug was developed by Walter Abraham Jacobs, Michael Heidelberger, Louise Pearce, and Wade Hampton Brown of the Rockefeller Foundation and tested in the Belgian Congo in 1920 by Louise Pearce. He also established the area's first leper treatment center in 1932 and the first tuberculosis treatment center in 1939.

== Early life ==
Arthur Lewis Piper was born in Knapp's Corner, a small village close to the Pennsylvanian-New York border. He was one of seven children, with three of his siblings dying at an early age. From the age of twelve, he meticulously read and studied the bible in order to gain acceptance into the Methodist Church and by fifteen, had joined the chapter in Bradford, Pennsylvania.

== Education ==
He studied at Eden High School, during which he developed his ambition to be a missionary in China, and provide medical care in addition to pastoral care. After he graduated in 1901, he attended the University of Buffalo Medical School, where he was an average student. He took an absence to care for his diabetic father and did not resume studies until 1903. However, his father died of its complications in 1907, a few months before his medical school graduation.

In 1912, he attended the White's Bible School and the Post Graduate Hospital, in New York City, to prepare for his pastoral missionary work and to acquire knowledge of tropical medicine. He would further his studies into tropical medicine in 1913 at the London School of Tropical Medicine.

== Personal life ==
He met his wife, Maude E. Garret, through introduction by her sister. Maude graduated from Wesleyan and went to the New York Deaconess Training School. For six years, she was a deaconess for the New York Methodist Church. At first, she was arranging to go with another missionary group to Labrador. However, Piper and Maude married on October 17, 1913, right before they sailed to the Congo.

Piper had two daughters named Ruth and Margaret. The first white child born in that area, Ruth was born in 1915. Margaret was born in 1920. Ruth and Margaret both quickly learned Lunda. Although they were home-schooled for a while, they attended the English boarding school in Akeji, Northern Rhodesia. Both daughters returned to America to attend college and became nurses.

== The Journey ==
In 1911, Piper was notified by the New York Methodist Mission Field Office that a medical missionary was required in the Belgian Congo. Despite the fact that the mortality rate for medical missionaries at the time was 21%, the accepted the 5-year contract and closed his Buffalo medical practice to prepare for his missionary work in New York City. He received a modest annual salary of $400 for the next five years.

By early 1913, in anticipation for Piper's arrival, a mission was built near Masumba, the village of Mwata Yamvo, the Paramount Chief of the Lunda tribe. The Lunda tribe was part of the Bantu people. Piper and his team would be the only whites, besides two nearby government officials, in the area of 15,000 square miles (39,000 square kilometres) with 45,000 Africans. The remoteness of Mwata-Yamvo was evident as it was about 1,200 miles (1,900 kilometres) from the coast, 500 miles (800 kilometres) away from the Northern Rhodesian border and 100 miles (160 kilometres) away from the border of Angola.

A day after his marriage, Piper and his wife sailed to London and to acquire additional equipment for the journey. By March 14, 1914, they arrived in Kambove to stay and prepare for the trip to Masumba with John McKendree Springer, after 75 days of sail and railroad since leaving London. While at Kambove, Piper would have his first experience in treating remote patients through setting up a small clinic.

Leaving on April 28, the Pipers finally arrived at Masumba on June 22, 1914, after traveling for 55 days overland via rail and trail. They were graciously greeted by over 300 people singing hymns under an arboreal arch. Springer stated about the joyous celebration, "I have never heard of another instance where missionaries, coming for the first time to reside in a country, have had so unique and so royal a welcome."

The Pipers were pleased to discover that the soil and climate allowed a plentiful farm to be grown; thus, the Pipers camp always had enough fruits and vegetable. It was an "oasis for food, medicine, and the spirit."

== Religious associations ==
Piper stated in his report to the Methodist Episcopal Church, "We believe that opportunity in this field is one which cannot be excelled anywhere, and that every effort made, and every dollar expended, for the work in this field, will be in due course of time show, in a very large and very real way, that God's name is being glorified, and His kingdom spread."

At the first meeting of the Congo Mission of the Methodist Episcopal Church on January 2, 1915, Piper and his wife were two of the four missionaries on the Board of Foreign Missionaries. The Conference Group, consisting of Dr. Springer, R.S. Guptill, Mrs. Miller, Mrs. Springer, Bishop Hartzell, Mrs. Guptill, and the pupils of the Fox Bible Training School, agreed that Piper should be a member of the annual conference and ordained. Springer, with the approval of the Bishop, recommended Piper, given his passing of his studies, to be on the West Central Africa Mission Conference for reception on trial. Piper was also recommended that the conference elect him to deacon's and elder's orders under the missionary rule. Additionally, Piper was licensed as a local preacher, per Springer's recommendation.

The preacher Mwata Yamvo was stationed with Piper. They had Sunday chapel service at 7:30 AM. Regular church service was then held at the mission at 10:30 AM, with about 45-65 people attendees. Later after dinner, there are about 10-11 short services at different parts in Mwata Yamvo's village about half a mile away. About 100 people attended.

Every weekday, Piper rang the morning bell at 6:30 AM, met with the mission members at 7:00 AM for morning chapel service, and finally started the regular work for the day. Lunch was at 12:00 PM and at 5:30, they ended the work day. On Saturdays, they only worked until noon.

== Medical practice at Masumba ==
In order to treat his patients at Masumba, Piper started learning the culture. First, to converse, he learned Lunda by using the translated hymns and the Gospel of Mark. He also familiarized himself with their old medical traditions; the Lunda tribe worshiped fetishes and deferred to witch doctors.

Piper built a dispensary and a small surgery room. The main colony had 350 houses. It also had a nine-room dispensary, a four-room schoolhouse, and a church that seated 500 people. By 1939, the main mission center had more than 800 patients. Meanwhile, the other four rural dispensaries had 300-400 more patients. He routinely treated "yaws, sleeping sickness, venereal diseases, leprosy, tropical ulcers, hernias, elephantiasis, tumors, goiters, fractures, urinary stones, dental caries, dysentery, a multitude of skin conditions and intestinal worm infections."

The natives visited the clinic once they had already attempted all the local remedies. Patients came with their families who cooked for them, talked to them, and protected them. As a result, native lodgings were constructed for the patients' families. Piper even successfully treated Mwata Yamvo, the king of the Lunda tribe, for two weeks daily. Unfortunately, due to the contagious, risky nature of his work, Piper and his family contracted malaria. However, they all persevered and overcame the illness.

During his sabbaticals, Piper brought back useful supplies, including furniture, building supplies, and even a car and a truck.

== Legacy ==
Piper implemented important sanitation measures. For example, he protected the well from animal and human contamination. The act of keeping patients and patients' dwellings clean also spread to nearby villages.

Piper also trained more than 60 physician assistants. In addition, he trained women to become midwives. As a result, infant mortality went down drastically. In fact, quality infant care was one of the reasons why the natives trusted the Pipers.

Moreover, Sleeping sickness, trypanosomiasis, was a major threat to the native population. The disease was prevalent in swampy areas due to its carrier, the tsetse fly. Piper was one of the first to introduce the Rockefeller Foundation's drug tryparasmide, after receiving some training during his 1925 sabbatical. Then, he went on to train his assistants in preventive measures, like keeping away from the swamps. During his sabbatical, he stated, "Three cures are now in existence and give definite hope for the future. They are the German preparation known as Bayer 20S, a Rockefeller Institute preparation called tryparsamide, and a French specific. These are not yet in general use, but I hope to adopt them when I get back." [2] As a sacrifice, Piper was infected, but used his trained assistants to administer the injections and recovered completely.

Piper also established the first leper treatment center in the area in 1932. He dedicated ten years to lobbying, drafting letters, and requesting for the Belgian authorities and the American Leprosy Mission to give them adequate funds for the land and buildings. With his assistants, Piper gave 32,000 injections of Chaulmoogra oil in one year. By 1940, the main clinic boasted of about 260 Hansen patients.

Before the treatment center, he had stated earlier to The New York Times, "Last year I made my first attempt to treat the lepers in the district. They are not segregated, as the disease is of a comparative mild variety, and they constitute 4% of the population." Only sporadic attempts were made to help the lepers in the area. [2] He selected his friend and most trusted aide, Chimbu, who he cured from leprosy, as the treatment center's teacher and pastor.

He also established the first treatment center for tuberculosis in the Belgian Congo. This was a result of his 1939 sabbatical in the Post Graduate Hospital and Sea View Sanitarium on Staten Island, learning the causes, prevention, and treatment of tuberculosis.

== Later years ==
Like many missionaries, Piper returned home to the United States for retirement. He retired in 1953 at the age of 70 to Center Ossipee, New Hampshire. On November 21, 1959, he returned one last time to the Belgian Congo for the opening of the modern Piper Memorial Hospital, which was dedicated to his work in raising the health standards in Masumba. The hospital was later renamed the Samuteb Hospital after the rebellions in the 1960s.

Later, in 1968, Piper got sick in Tampa, Florida, and died in 1971 at the age of 87.
