= Bay St. Louis station =

Intercity train station in Bay St. Louis, Mississippi, US

Bay St. Louis, MS
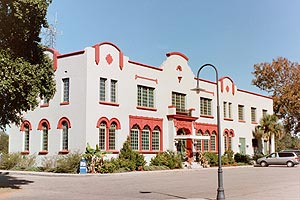
- The former L&N depot, photographed in 2001

General information
- Location: 303 South Railroad Avenue; Bay St. Louis, Mississippi
- Coordinates: 30.30852°N 89.33423°W
- Line: CSX NO&M Subdivision

Other information
- Station code: Amtrak: BAS

History
- Opened: April 29, 1984; March 31, 1993; August 18, 2025
- Closed: 1971; January 6, 1985; August 28, 2005
- Rebuilt: 1929

Passengers
- FY 2025: 2,310 (Amtrak)

Services
Preceding station	Amtrak	Following station
New Orleans Terminus	Mardi Gras Service	Gulfport toward Mobile
Former services
Preceding station	Amtrak	Following station
New Orleans toward Los Angeles	Sunset Limited (1993–2005)	Gulfport toward Orlando or Miami
East New Orleans (1984–1985) toward New Orleans	Gulf Coast Limited	Gulfport toward Mobile
New Orleans (1996–1997) Terminus	Gulf Coast Limited	Gulfport toward Mobile
Preceding station	Louisville and Nashville Railroad	Following station
Claiborne toward New Orleans	Main Line	Pass Christian toward Cincinnati

Mississippi Landmark
Location

Bay St. Louis station is an Amtrak intercity train station in Bay St. Louis, Mississippi.

== History ==
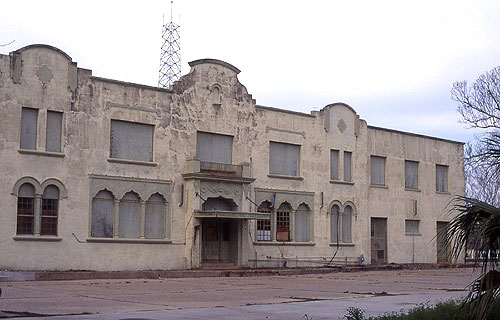
The station building in 1995

The Louisville and Nashville Railroad (L&N) built the station in 1929, replacing an older structure. L&N services to Bay St. Louis included the Pan-American, Gulf Wind, and Humming Bird. Into the late 1960s, the Southern Railway Crescent and Piedmont Limited also used the station.

Amtrak service to the station began with the Gulf Coast Limited, which operated between 1984 and 1985. The stop was reactivated on March 31, 1993, with the eastward extension of the Sunset Limited. Damage to the rail line resulting from Hurricane Katrina in 2005 caused Amtrak to suspend service east of New Orleans, including at Bay St. Louis. In anticipation of restored service, Amtrak began construction of a new ADA-compliant platform in 2022.

Service to Bay St. Louis returned with the establishment of the New Orleans–Mobile Mardi Gras Service on August 18, 2025.
