= Valena C. Jones School (Mississippi) =

School in Hancock County, US 1892–1969

Location
- 310 Old Spanish Trail, Bay St. Louis, Mississippi, US
- Coordinates: 30.309730°N 89.343177°W

Information
- Former name: Bay St. Louis Negro School
- Established: 1892
- Closed: 1969
- Grades: 1–10th
- Designation: Mississippi Landmark
- Designation date: May 26, 2023

Valena C. Jones School (1892–1969) also known as Bay St. Louis Negro School, was a public school for African American students in Bay St. Louis, Mississippi, US. The school offered classes for first grade through tenth grade. The former school building is part of the Old Bay St. Louis Historic District, and is listed as a contributing property by the National Register of Historic Places, since July 8, 2010; and listed as a Mississippi Landmark since May 26, 2023.

== History ==
It was founded as the Bay St. Louis Negro School in 1892. The school was renamed after Valena Cecelia MacArthur Jones (1872–1917), a noted 19th-century African American educator, who served as the principal at the school from 1892 until 1897.

A one-story, L-plan, modern style brick school building was constructed in 1947, at 310 Old Spanish Trail. In 1969, the school closed.

From 1969 to 1972, the campus was reopened and served as a primary school until its full closure. After the campus served as the Hancock County branch of the Boys & Girls Clubs of the Gulf Coast. The Valena C. Jones Memorial United Methodist Church (1926) at 248 Sycamore Street is located nearby.

== Notable alumni ==
- Beverly Anderson (born 1943), mathematician and professor emeritus at University of the District of Columbia

== See also ==
- Education segregation in the Mississippi Delta
- Education segregation in the Mississippi Red Clay region
- Brown v. Board of Education (1954)
