= National Register of Historic Places listings in Hancock County, Mississippi =

Location of Hancock County in Mississippi

This is a list of the National Register of Historic Places listings in Hancock County, Mississippi.

This is intended to be a complete list of the properties and districts on the National Register of Historic Places in Hancock County, Mississippi, United States. Latitude and longitude coordinates are provided for many National Register properties and districts; these locations may be seen together in a map.

There are 19 properties and districts listed on the National Register in the county, including 1 National Historic Landmark. Another 4 properties were once listed but have been removed.

This National Park Service list is complete through NPS recent listings posted October 23, 2026.

== Current listings ==
	Name on the Register	Image	Date listed	Location	City or town	Description
1	Beach Boulevard Historic District		November 25, 1980 (#80002239)	Roughly bounded by Beach Boulevard, Necaise Ave., Seminary Dr., and 2nd and 3rd Sts. 30°18′24″N 89°20′30″W	Bay St. Louis	
2	Building at 242 St. Charles Street	Building at 242 St. Charles Street	November 25, 1980 (#80002240)	242 St. Charles St. 30°18′12″N 89°20′35″W	Bay St. Louis	
3	Claiborne Site (22Ha501)	Claiborne Site (22Ha501)	November 12, 1982 (#82000574)	Address restricted	Pearlington	
4	Holly Bluff on-the-Jordan		January 30, 2025 (#100011347)	6670 Crump Road; 30°23′41″N 89°25′38″W	Kiln vicinity	
5	House at 5098 MS 604		January 19, 2016 (#15000985)	5098 MS 604; 30°14′34″N 89°36′34″W	Pearlington	
6	Jackson Landing Site	Jackson Landing Site	July 27, 1973 (#73001009)	Address restricted	Pearlington	
7	Main Street Historic District	Main Street Historic District	November 25, 1980 (#80002241)	Main St. 30°18′56″N 89°20′37″W	Bay St. Louis	
8	William and Mary McGee House	William and Mary McGee House	October 4, 2021 (#100006893)	16634 Whites Rd. 30°15′14″N 89°36′39″W	Pearlington	
9	Nugent Site (22HA592)	Nugent Site (22HA592)	April 13, 1988 (#88000307)	Address restricted	Kiln	
10	Old Bay St. Louis Historic District		July 8, 2010 (#10000441)	Roughly bounded by Beach Boulevard and 3rd St. on the east, Breath Ln. and Highway 90 on the north, Seminary Dr., St. Francis St., and Old Spanish Trail on the west, and Carre Ct., Washington St., and Bookter St. on the south 30°18′32″N 89°19′48″W	Bay St. Louis	
11	Rocket Propulsion Test Complex	Rocket Propulsion Test Complex	October 3, 1985 (#85002805)	National Space Technology Laboratories; 30°21′56″N 89°35′13″W	Bay St. Louis	
12	SJ Mound (22HA594)	SJ Mound (22HA594)	April 13, 1988 (#88000304)	Address restricted	Pearlington	
13	Sycamore Street Historic District		November 25, 1980 (#80002242)	Sycamore St. 30°18′31″N 89°20′39″W	Bay St. Louis	
14	Three Sisters Shell Midden (22-Ha-596)	Three Sisters Shell Midden (22-Ha-596)	July 28, 1988 (#88001138)	Address restricted	Pearlington	
15	Up the Tree Shell Midden (22HA595)	Up the Tree Shell Midden (22HA595)	April 13, 1988 (#88000306)	Address restricted	Pearlington	
16	Washington Street Historic District		November 25, 1980 (#80002243)	Washington St. 30°18′24″N 89°20′30″W	Bay St. Louis	
17	Waveland Elementary School	Waveland Elementary School	June 2, 2014 (#14000273)	335 Coleman Ave. 30°17′11″N 89°22′28″W	Waveland	Now houses the Ground Zero Hurricane Museum
18	Webb School/Gulf Coast Community Action Agency	Webb School/Gulf Coast Community Action Agency	November 21, 1986 (#86003554)	300 3rd St. 30°18′16″N 89°20′19″W	Bay St. Louis	
19	Williams Site (22-Ha-585)	Williams Site (22-Ha-585)	July 28, 1988 (#88001137)	Address restricted	Pearlington	

== Former listings ==
	Name on the Register	Image	Date listed	Date removed	Location	City or town	Description
1	Glen Oaks		November 21, 1986 (#86003271)	July 16, 2008	806 North Beach Boulevard	Bay St. Louis	Also known as the Kimbrough House. Destroyed by Hurricane Katrina in 2005.
2	Onward Oaks		November 1, 1996 (#96001265)	July 16, 2008	972 South Beach Boulevard	Bay St. Louis	Suffered major damage from Hurricane Camille in 1969. Destroyed by Hurricane Katrina in 2005.
3	Taylor House		November 21, 1986 (#86003273)	July 16, 2008	808 North Beach Boulevard	Bay St. Louis	Destroyed by Hurricane Katrina in 2005.
4	Taylor School		January 15, 1987 (#87000209)	July 16, 2008	116 Leonard Street	Bay St. Louis	Destroyed by Hurricane Katrina in 2005.

== See also ==
- List of National Historic Landmarks in Mississippi
- National Register of Historic Places listings in Mississippi
