= Valena C. Jones =

American educator (1872–1917)

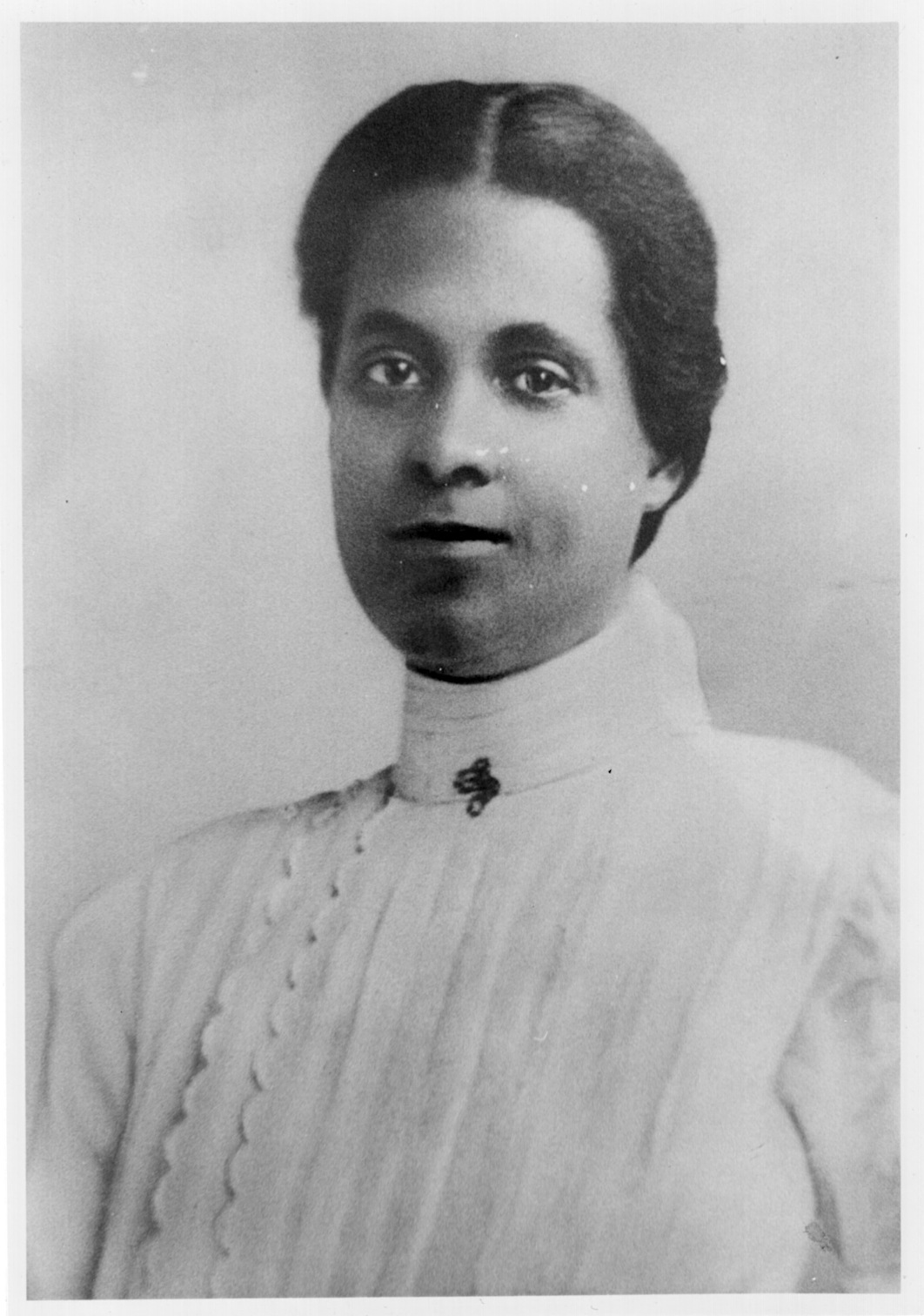
- Born: Valena Cecilia MacArthur; August 3, 1872; Bay Saint Louis, Mississippi, U.S.
- Died: January 13, 1917 (aged 44); New Orleans, Louisiana, U.S.
- Burial place: Greenwood Cemetery, New Orleans, Louisiana, U.S.
- Other names: Valena Cecelia MacArthur Jones, Valena C. McArthur Jones
- Education: Straight University
- Occupations: Educator, principal, assistant editor
- Spouse: Rev. Robert R. Jones (m. 1901–1917; her death)

Valena Cecilia Jones (née MacArthur; August 3, 1872 – January 13, 1917) was an American educator and principal. Several schools have been named in her honor, including in New Orleans, and Bay Saint Louis, Mississippi.

== Life and career ==
Valena Cecilia Jones was born as Valena Cecilia MacArthur on August 3, 1872, in Bay Saint Louis, Mississippi; to parents Henrietta Knight and Elbert Eldridge MacArthur. Jones graduated in 1892 from Straight University in New Orleans (later merged with Dillard University).

After graduation, she became the principal of the Bay Saint Louis Negro School in her hometown, where she remained until 1897. She returned to New Orleans to teach at public schools for the next few years. She was awarded a bicycle after being voted "most popular colored teacher in the city".

In 1901, she married Rev. Robert R. Jones, and together they had three children. Jones had to leave teaching after marriage, and helped her husband edit the Southwestern Christian Advocate for the next 12 years.

After struggling for six months with an illness she died on January 13, 1917, in New Orleans, and is buried at Greenwood Cemetery.

== See also ==
- Valena C. Jones School (Mississippi)
