= Isaiah Benjamin Scott =

American theologian (1854–1931)

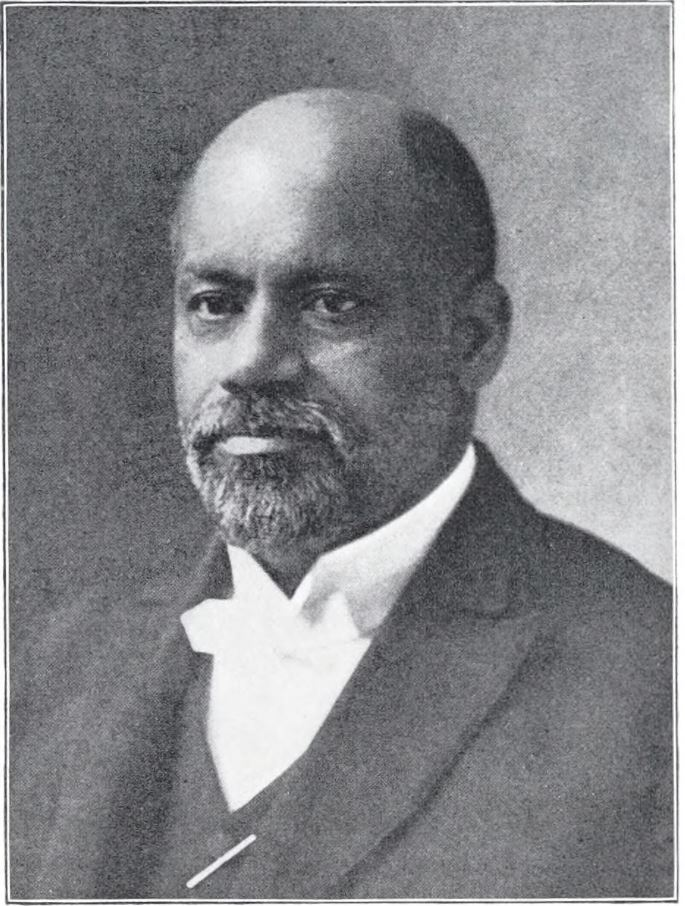
- Isaiah Benjamin Scott, c. 1910
- Born: September 30, 1854; Woodford County, Kentucky
- Died: July 4, 1931 (aged 76); Nashville, Tennessee
- Resting place: Greenwood Cemetery
- Education: Central Tennessee College
- Occupation(s): Clergyman, journalist
- Spouse: Mattie J. Evans (m. 1881)
- Children: 6

Isaiah Benjamin Scott or I. B. Scott (September 30, 1854 - July 4, 1931) was an American theologian, educator, and journalist.

== Biography ==
Isaiah Benjamin Scott was born in Woodford County, Kentucky on September 30, 1854. He attended private schools in Frankfort, public schools in Austin, Texas, and Clark Atlanta University, before graduating from Central Tennessee College in 1880.

He married Mattie J. Evans in Franklin, Tennessee on May 24, 1881, and they had six children.

Scott was an ordained Methodist Episcopal reverend and elder; and was active in the leadership of the denomination. He attended five general conferences, three Ecumenical Methodist conferences and served on the church's National Book and Missionary committees. Scott was appointed by the Methodist Episcopal Church to be the first African-American President of Wiley College in Marshall, Texas and to serve as a Missionary Bishop in Liberia. Scott served as one of the African-American commissioners from Texas to the Chicago World's Fair in 1893 and the Atlanta Exposition in 1895. In 1909 Scott was honored with knighthood in the Humane Order of African Redemption.

Isaiah Benjamin Scott died at his home in Nashville, Tennessee on July 4, 1931, He was buried at Greenwood Cemetery.

== See also ==
- List of bishops of the United Methodist Church
