= Terre Haute Union Station =

Former train station in Terre Haute, Indiana

Coordinates: 39.47321°N 87.40317°W

Terre Haute
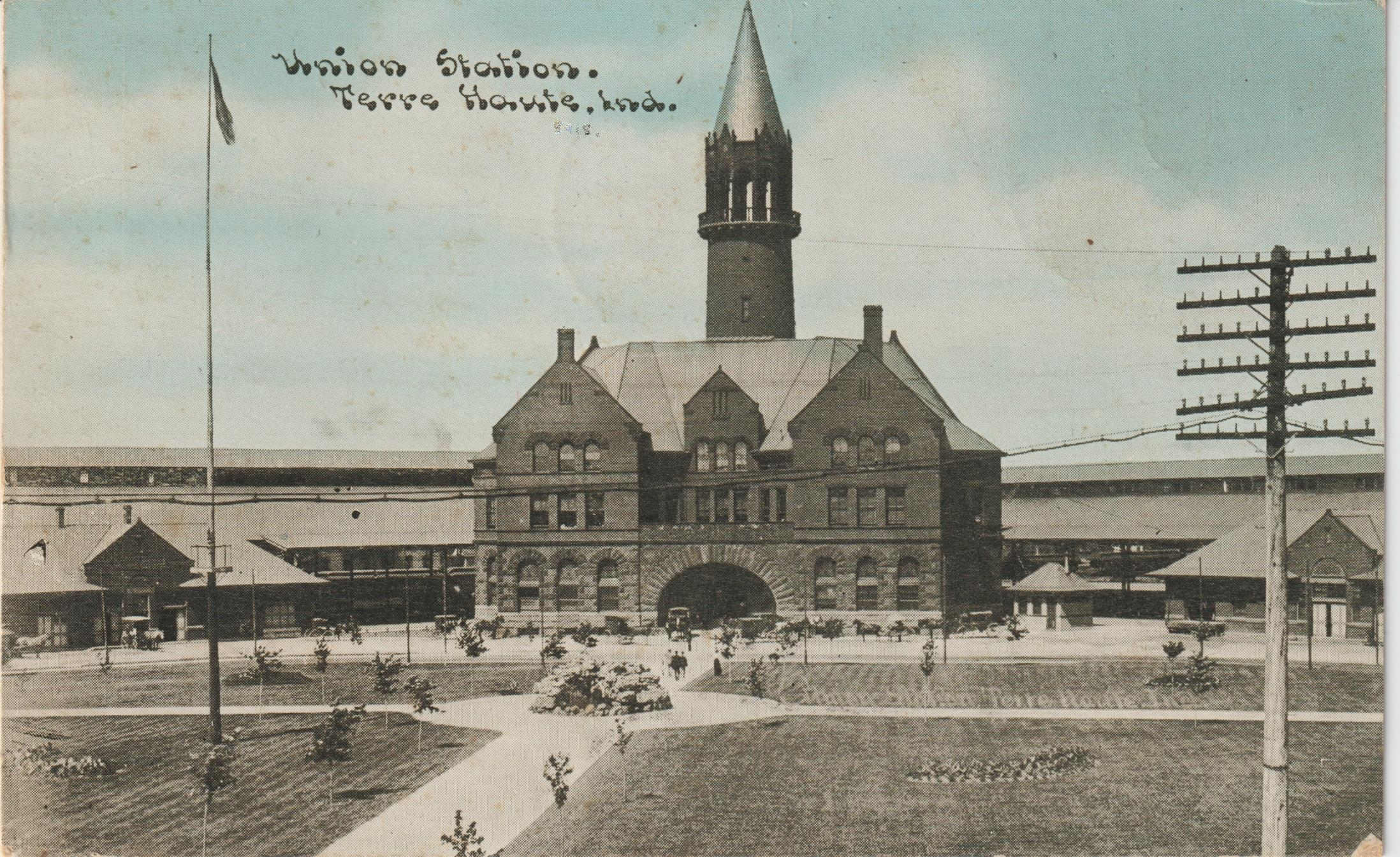
- Terre Haute Union Station, c. 1910

General information
- Location: 301 North 8th Street; Terre Haute, Indiana

History
- Opened: August 15, 1893
- Closed: February 28, 1969

Key dates
- June 1960: Union Station demolished

Former services
| Preceding station | Chicago and Eastern Illinois Railroad | Following station |
|---|---|---|
| Baker toward Evansville | Main Line | Dewey toward Chicago |
| Preceding station | Milwaukee Road | Following station |
| Bradshaw toward Terre Haute | Terre Haute Division | Dewey toward Westport |
| Preceding station | Pennsylvania Railroad | Following station |
| Farrington toward St. Louis | St. Louis – Pittsburgh | Prairie toward Pittsburgh |
Location

Terre Haute Union Station was a passenger train station located at Ninth Street and Spruce Street, Terre Haute, Indiana, serving riders for nearly 67 years. It was completed on August 15, 1893, at the cost of $273,000.

Union Station was designed by Cincinnati architect Samuel Hannaford. The station was a three and a half story structure built in the Romanesque style. Originally, it served the Chicago and Eastern Illinois Railroad and the Terre Haute & Indianapolis Railroad (which was bought by the Pennsylvania Railroad three days after Union Station opened), as it was at the junction of the two lines. The station also served the Chicago, Milwaukee, St. Paul and Pacific Railroad (also known as the ‘Milwaukee Road’). The last Milwaukee Road service was a short line route to Bedford, Indiana to the southeast. The company moved its last service out of the station in the 1930s.

Barbara Carney, a railroad museum administrator, said that Buffalo Bill, Jack Benny, and presidents Benjamin Harrison, William McKinley, Theodore Roosevelt, William Howard Taft, Franklin D. Roosevelt, Harry S. Truman and Richard Nixon all stopped at Union Station at some point.

The station was demolished in the middle of June, 1960, with a crowd of approximately 1,000 observing the event. In subsequent years, the adjacent Railway Express Agency building served as the passenger station, and was later the site of the African American Culture Center at Indiana State University.

Passenger service of the Chicago & Eastern Illinois Railroad was withdrawn in 1968, and Penn Central ended service on February 28, 1969, after the remaining passenger trains were moved to the ex-New York Central Railroad line.

== Named passenger trains serving Union Station ==
- Chicago and Eastern Illinois Railroad, in 1954, daily departures, except where marked *:
  - Dixie Flagler* (Chicago - Miami)
  - Dixie Flyer (Chicago - Jacksonville)
  - Georgian (Chicago – Atlanta)
  - Humming Bird (Chicago – New Orleans)
- Pennsylvania Railroad, in 1953, daily departures:
  - Allegheny (eastbound only) (St. Louis – New York)
  - American (St. Louis – New York)
  - Mail and Express (westbound only) (Pittsburgh – St. Louis)
  - Penn Texas (St. Louis – New York)
  - Spirit of St. Louis (St. Louis – New York)
  - St. Louisan (St. Louis – New York)

== See also ==
- Terre Haute station (Amtrak)
