= Meadowlark (disambiguation) =

A meadowlark is a bird belonging to either of two genera, Leistes or Sturnella, in the New World family Icteridae.

Meadowlark or Meadowlarks may also refer to:

== Arts and entertainment ==
- The Meadowlarks, a musical group
- Meadowlark (band), a British indie pop duo
- "Meadowlark" (song), from the musical The Baker's Wife
- "Meadowlarks", a song from the album Fleet Foxes by Fleet Foxes
- Meadowlark, protagonist of the novel Shopping

== Transportation ==
- Meadowlark (train), operated by the Chicago and Eastern Illinois Railroad
- Meadowlark Airport, a former airport in Southern California
- Meadowlark Ultralight Meadowlark, an ultralight aircraft

== Other uses ==
- Meadowlark Lemon (1932–2015), American basketball player and actor
- Northampton Meadowlarks, a minor league baseball team
- USS Meadowlark (AMS-196), a coastal minesweeper
- Meadowlark Botanical Gardens, Vienna, Virginia, United States
- Meadowlark, a holistic retreat created by Evarts G. Loomis

== See also ==
- Meadow Lark Lake, Wyoming, United States, an unincorporated community
- Meadowlark Park
