= Dixie Flagler =

Passenger train between Chicago and Miami, ca. 1940

Henry M. Flagler Dixie Flagler Dixieland
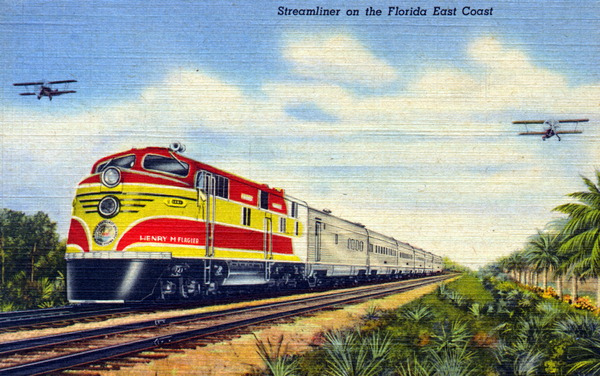
- Postcard of the Henry M. Flagler c. 1939–1940

Overview
- Service type: Inter-city rail
- Status: Discontinued
- Locale: Midwestern United States/Southeastern United States
- First service: December 3, 1939
- Last service: 1957
- Former operators: Chicago & Eastern Illinois, Louisville & Nashville, Atlantic Coast Line Railroad and Florida East Coast Railway

Route
- Termini: Chicago, Illinois; Miami, Florida
- Distance travelled: 1,454 miles (2,340 km)
- Average journey time: Southbound: 31 hrs 35 min; northbound: 29 hrs 20 min
- Service frequency: Every third day
- Train number: Southbound: 11, Northbound: 12

On-board services
- Seating arrangements: Reclining Seat Coaches
- Sleeping arrangements: Open sections, roomettes, double bedrooms, compartments and a drawing room
- Catering facilities: Dining car
- Observation facilities: Tavern lounge
- Baggage facilities: Baggage car

Technical
- Track gauge: 1,435 mm (4 ft 8 1/2 in)

The Dixie Flagler was a streamlined passenger train operated by the Florida East Coast Railway (FEC) between Chicago, Illinois and Miami, Florida. It began in 1939 as the Henry M. Flagler, a regional service between Miami and Jacksonville, Florida; the FEC renamed it and extended it to Chicago a year later. It was one of the few Chicago to Florida trains that passed through Atlanta. As an overnight streamliner it was part of the every-third-day pool shared by the City of Miami and South Wind. It was renamed Dixieland in 1954 and discontinued altogether in 1957.

== History ==
The train began as the Henry M. Flagler, a daily streamliner between Jacksonville and Miami, named for industrialist Henry Flagler. This service began on December 3, 1939, using a set of equipment built by the Budd Company. With the introduction of two new overnight all-coach streamliners on cooperating railroads, the Henry M. Flagler equipment was placed in service on a rotating once every three days overnight schedule between Chicago and Miami as the Dixie Flagler beginning December 17, 1940. Together with its counterparts the South Wind and City of Miami, the trains offered daily service between Chicago and the east coast of Florida. Originally intended as a winter-season-only service, the public response was strong enough that the trains were placed into permanent year-round service by the summer of 1941.

The FEC dropped the Dixie Flagler name in 1954 in favor of Dixieland; it discontinued the service altogether in 1957. However, the Dixie Flyer, operating over the same route, with a night departure from Chicago, endured until 1965, and carried on by the Atlantic Coast Line Railroad and the Seaboard Coast Line Railroad until 1969.

== Route ==
As a daytime streamliner, the Henry M. Flagler operated entirely over the Florida East Coast Railway, however, this particular train ended in 1940.

To travel from Chicago to Florida, the Dixie Flagler used six separate railroads. The train left Chicago's Dearborn Station on the Chicago and Eastern Illinois Railroad (C&EI). Between Evansville, Indiana, and Nashville, Tennessee, it used the Louisville and Nashville Railroad (L&N). From Nashville south to Atlanta, Georgia's Union Station, via Chattanooga, TN, it used the Nashville, Chattanooga and St. Louis Railway (NC), a subsidiary of the L&N. From Atlanta southeast to Waycross, Georgia, it travelled over the Atlanta, Birmingham and Coast Railroad (AB&C), a subsidiary of the Atlantic Coast Line Railroad (ACL). At Waycross it joined the ACL itself, and stayed on it until reaching Jacksonville, the northern terminus of the FEC. From there, the train proceeded over the FEC to Miami. At Jacksonville it had sections that split and joined with the ACL's West Coast Champion and went to Sarasota via Orlando and Tampa, and St. Petersburg via Gainesville.

=== Major stops ===
- Chicago (Dearborn Station)
- St. Louis (Union Station) [the Chicago and St. Louis branches converged in Evansville]
- Terre Haute (Union Station)
- Evansville (L&N station)
- Nashville (Union Station)
- Chattanooga (Union Station)
- Atlanta (Union Station)
- Jacksonville (Union Station)
- Daytona Beach
- West Palm Beach
- Fort Lauderdale
- Miami (FEC station)

Separate connecting Atlantic Coast Line branches from Jacksonville served Gainesville, Orlando, Tampa, St. Petersburg, Sarasota and Ft. Myers.

== Equipment ==
Sample consist
1939
- Train: Original consist
- Baggage-dormitory-coach "Stuart" (14 seats); Coach "Hobe Sound" (60 seats); Coach "Delray Beach" (52 seats); Dining car "Fort Lauderdale" (48 seats); Coach "Hollywood" (60 seats); Coach "Melbourne" (60 seats); Tavern-lounge-observation "Lake Worth"

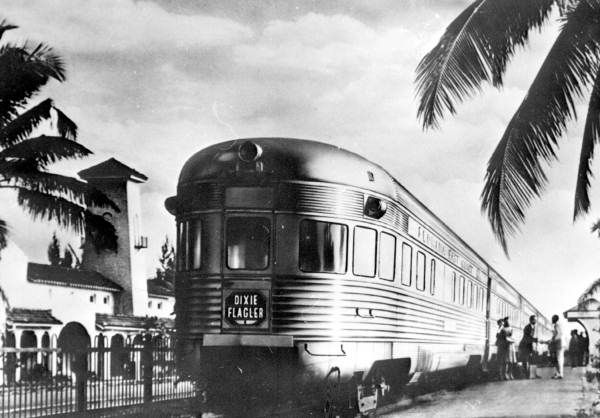
The tavern-lounge-observation car Lake Worth brings up the rear of the Dixie Flagler in Hollywood, Florida in 1941

The Budd Company delivered the original equipment set for the Henry M. Flagler in November 1939. The consist matched three sets delivered for the new Champion. Each equipment set consisted of a baggage-dormitory-coach, four coaches, a dining car, and a tavern-lounge-observation car.

Originally a coach-only train, the Dixie Flagler later received sleeping cars. In 1950 the train departed Chicago with six sleeping cars, five for Miami and one for Jacksonville. These cars had the following configuration:

- 3 compartments, 1 double bedroom, buffet-lounge
- 6 sections, 6 double bedrooms
- 8 sections, 2 compartments, 1 drawing room
- 12 roomettes, 2 single bedrooms, 3 double bedrooms
- 6 compartments, 3 double bedrooms
- 8 sections, 2 compartments, 1 double bedroom

The train carried a full dining car for the entire trip: a C&EI dining car operated between Chicago and Jacksonville, after which an FEC dining car replaced it. The FEC's tavern-lounge-observation car made the entire trip.
