= Georgian (train) =

Overview
- Service type: Inter-city rail
- Status: Discontinued
- Locale: Midwestern United States/Southeastern United States
- First service: 1946
- Last service: 1968
- Former operators: Chicago and Eastern Illinois Railroad, Louisville and Nashville Railroad and Nashville, Chattanooga and St. Louis Railway

Route
- Termini: Chicago, Illinois and St. Louis, Missouri; Atlanta, Georgia
- Distance travelled: 731 miles (1,176 km) (Chicago - Atlanta)
- Service frequency: Daily
- Train number: 53, 54, 93, 94

On-board services
- Seating arrangements: coach
- Sleeping arrangements: sections, roomettes, double bedrooms and a compartment
- Catering facilities: dining cars and tavern-lounge cars

The Georgian was a long-distance passenger train operated by the Louisville and Nashville Railroad in conjunction with the Chicago and Eastern Illinois Railroad. It operated between St. Louis Union Station and Atlanta's Union Station with a section operated by the C&EI from Evansville to Chicago's Dearborn Station. From Nashville to Atlanta it operated over the tracks of the Nashville, Chattanooga and St. Louis Railway. The introduction of this train made the C&EI's Chicago-Evansville Whippoorwill train superfluous.

It was begun in 1946 as a streamliner. As a night train, it offered sleeping car and dining car services. In 1968 the L&N Railroad discontinued the Georgian. In its place was an unnamed St. Louis-Evansville train, and an unnamed Evansville-Atlanta train. (The Chicago branch from Evansville eliminated, passengers seeking an L&N route would need to wait several hours at Nashville for a connection to the South Wind.) The St. Louis-Evansville and the Evansville-Atlanta trains were among the trains that Amtrak chose not to pick up when it assumed long-distance operations on May 1, 1971. Since that time Atlanta has had no service heading directly north to Tennessee.

== Important station stops ==
- Chicago
- Danville
- Terre Haute
- Vincennes
- Evansville
- Nashville
- Chattanooga
- Dalton
- Marietta
- Atlanta

=== Important stops on St. Louis section ===
- St. Louis
- Evansville
