= Evansville station (Louisville and Nashville Railroad) =

- Louisville and Nashville Railroad Station
- Formerly listed on the U.S. National Register of Historic Places
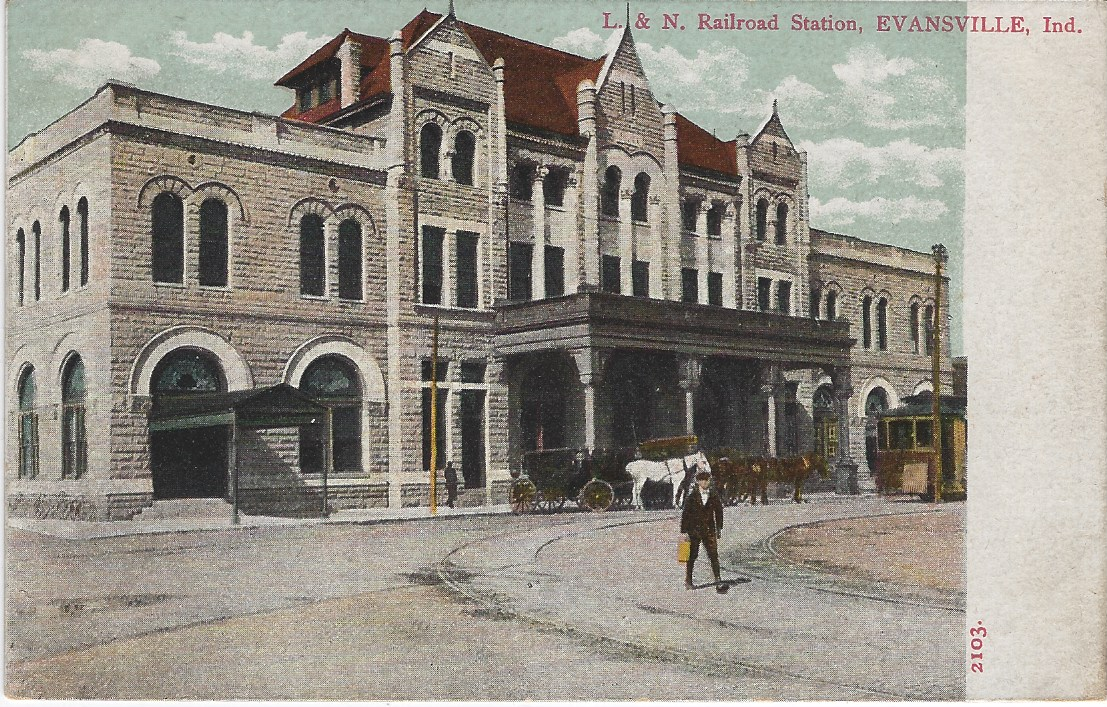
- L&N Railroad Station (Evansville, Indiana)

- Location within Indiana Location within the United States
- Location: 300 Fulton Avenue, Evansville, Indiana
- Coordinates: 37.9763°N 87.5819°W
- Area: 17 acres (6.9 ha)
- Built: 1902
- Architect: Montfort, Richard
- Architectural style: Romanesque, Richardsonian Romanesque
- NRHP reference No.: 79000049

Significant dates
- Added to NRHP: August 24, 1979
- Removed from NRHP: June 14, 1985

Louisville and Nashville Railroad Station, also known as L & N Station, was a historic train station located in downtown Evansville, Indiana. It was built in 1902 for the Louisville and Nashville Railroad, and was a Richardsonian Romanesque style rock-faced limestone building. It consisted of a three-story central block with two-story flanking wings, and a one-story baggage wing. It had projecting gabled pavilions and a slate hipped roof.

The station was host to tenant railroads, in addition to the L&N. In 1935 the Chicago and Eastern Illinois Railroad closed its depot and ran its trains to the L&N's station. The Big Four (by this point, fully integrated into the New York Central Railroad) also ran its trains to the station. With the end of Illinois Central passenger trains into its Evansville station in 1941, the L&N station that year became the sole passenger train station in the city that year.

Temporarily, immediately after the Ohio River flood of 1937, the trains serving the station were diverted to the Chicago & Eastern Illinois' deactivated depot.

== Named trains ==
In its heyday it served as a significant hub for Chicago & Eastern Illinois Railroad and Louisville and Nashville trains, notably:

- the Dixie Flagler (Chicago-Miami)
- the Dixie Flyer (Chicago-Miami)
- the Georgian (Chicago-Atlanta).

Each of these trains had sections originating from St. Louis. Those sections would link at Evansville with their counterpart train sections from Chicago's Dearborn Station and would continue south. Furthermore, a St. Louis-Nashville section of the New Orleans-bound Humming Bird made a stop at the station. Additionally, the station was a mid-point for overnight and day trains on an east-west St. Louis-Evansville-Owensboro-Louisville (Union Station) trains.

== Final years ==
Unnamed remnants of the Georgian last served the station in 1971. It was demolished February 27, 1985

It was listed on the National Register of Historic Places in 1979 and delisted in 1985.

Preceding station	Louisville and Nashville Railroad	Following station
Mt. Vernon toward St. Louis	St. Louis – Nashville	North Howell toward Nashville
Mt. Vernon toward St. Louis	St. Louis – Louisville	McLeansboro toward Louisville
Preceding station	Chicago and Eastern Illinois Railroad	Following station
Terminus	Main Line	Haubstadt toward Chicago
Preceding station	New York Central Railroad	Following station
Cynthiana toward Mt. Carmel	Chicago – Cairo Evansville branch	Terminus
Terminus	Evansville, Indianapolis and Terre Haute Railway	Daylight toward Terre Haute
