= Union Station (Nashville) =

Hotel and former railroad terminal in Nashville, Tennessee

Nashville, TN
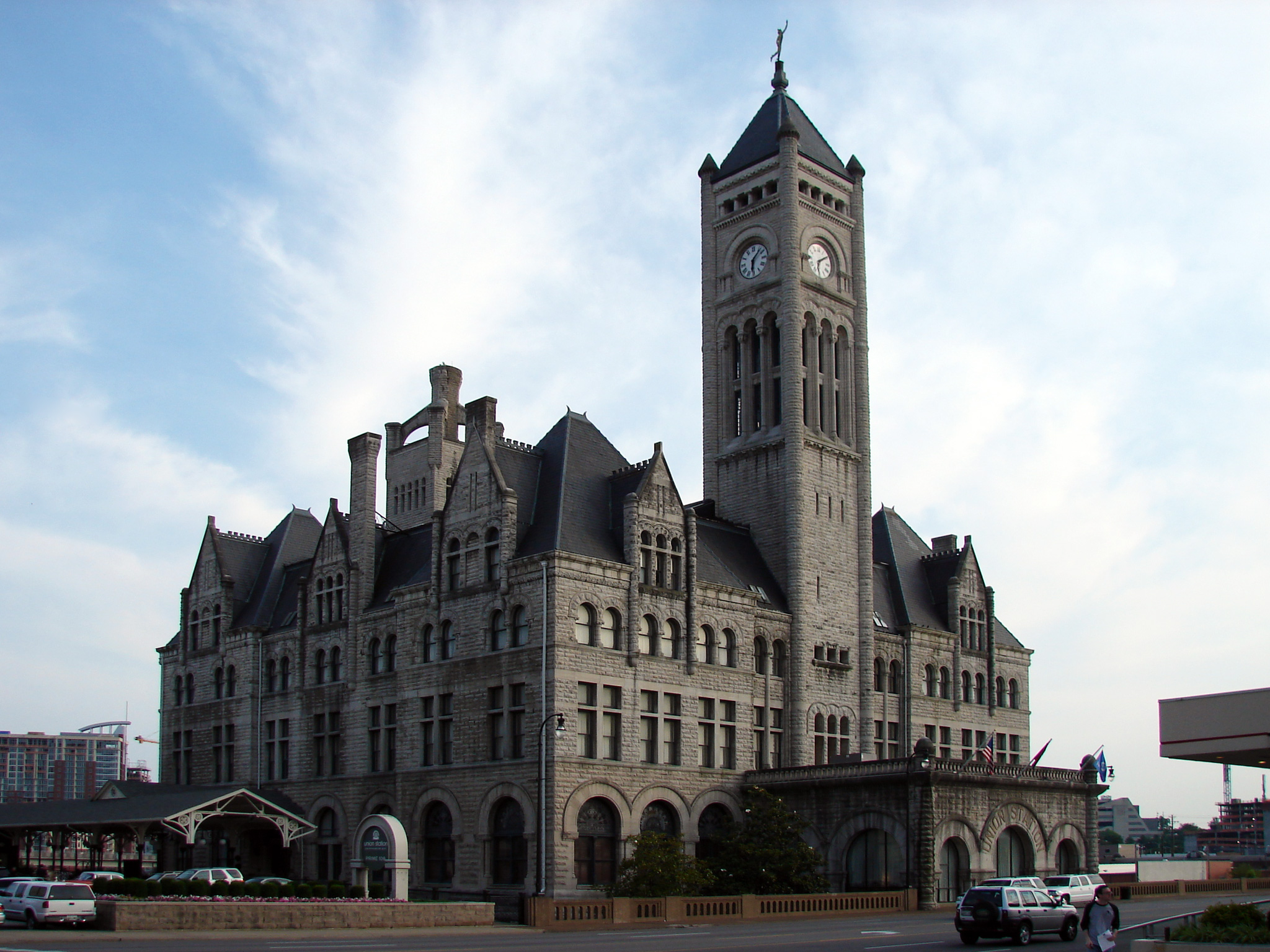
- The former Union Station, converted to a hotel, seen in 2008

General information
- Location: 1001 Broadway, Nashville, Tennessee; United States

History
- Closed: 1979

Former services
Preceding station	Amtrak	Following station
Decatur toward St. Petersburg or Miami	Floridian	Bowling Green toward Chicago
Preceding station	Louisville and Nashville Railroad	Following station
Harpeth toward New Orleans	Main Line	Montfort toward Cincinnati
North Capitol toward St. Louis	St. Louis – Nashville	Terminus
Preceding station	Nashville, Chattanooga and St. Louis Railway	Following station
Harding toward Memphis	Main Line	Lavergne toward Atlanta
- Nashville Union Station and Trainshed
- U.S. National Register of Historic Places
- Former U.S. National Historic Landmark
- Coordinates: 36.1572°N 86.7848°W
- Architect: Richard Montfort
- NRHP reference No.: 69000178

Significant dates
- Added to NRHP: December 30, 1969
- Designated NHL: 1975
- Delisted NHL: July 31, 2003
Location

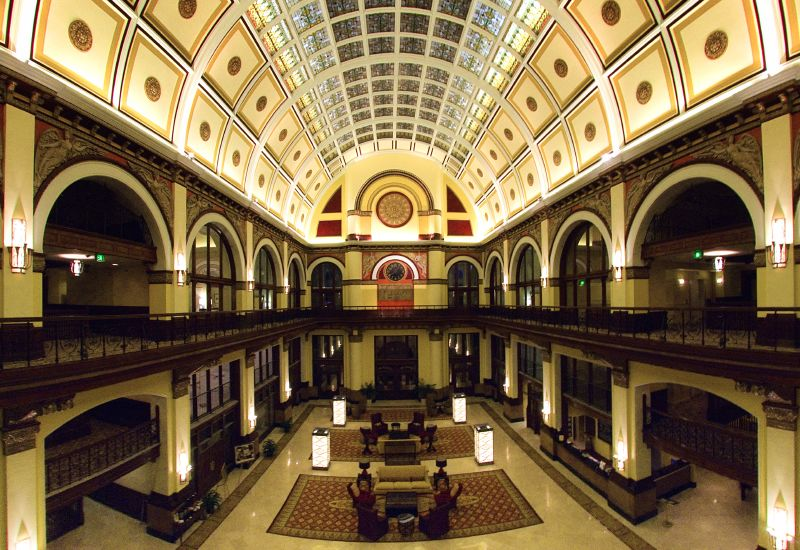
Interior of the hotel

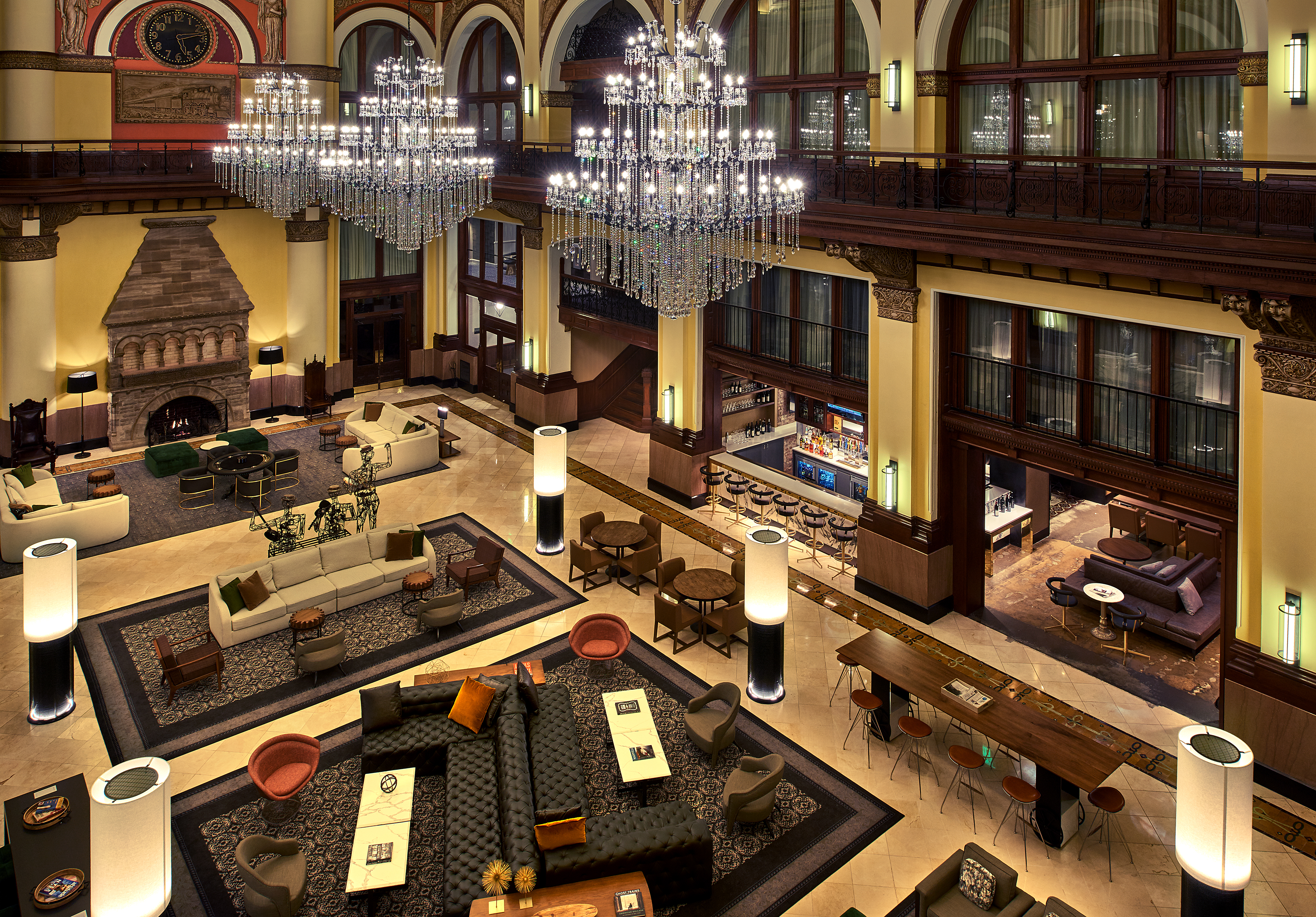
Hotel lobby and chandeliers

Nashville's Union Station is a former railroad terminal designed by Henry Hobson Richardson and Richard Montfort that was constructed beginning in 1898 and officially opened over two years later in 1900. Montfort - an engineer of the Louisville and Nashville Railroad (L&N) - spent several years planning the building's construction, and it is now known for its striking Romanesque Revival architecture that stands out from other train stations of the time. At the time, Nashville was becoming a modern metropolis in the South, and the terminal was created to cater to an increasing amount of guests who used trains to reach the city. The station served passengers of multiple railroads, the most prevalent of which being the L&N and the Nashville, Chattanooga, & St. Louis Line (NC&StL).

Built just west of the downtown area, it was spanned by a viaduct adjacent to the station and positioned to the east and above a natural railroad cut, through which most of the tracks in the area were routed. The station was also used by streetcars prior to their discontinuance in Nashville in 1941.

The last passenger train left the station in 1978, and in 1975 the building was designated a National Historic Landmark. Union Station reopened as the "Union Station Hotel" in 1986 after being abandoned for several years. The hotel became a Marriott Autograph Collection Hotel in 2012 and completed a full renovation of all guest rooms and public spaces in 2016. It became a member of Historic Hotels of America in 2015 and is considered a luxurious and charming choice for accommodations in Nashville today.

== History ==
The Louisville & Nashville Railroad (L&N) was the primary railroad operating routes through the Union Station. This line ran routes throughout the Southeastern U.S., eventually reaching some Midwestern hubs such as Chicago. The company's principal railroads began being built in 1853 between Kentucky and Tennessee, and the first segments of the railroad opened in 1855. The L&N's charter was completed in 1859 when it reached Nashville, but Civil War tensions between Union-led Kentucky and Confederate-led Tennessee halted further construction of the railroad.

Union Station (Nashville) was opened October 9, 1900 as a Louisville & Nashville Railroad station, and it had a long history of operation before it shut down in October 1979. It quickly became one of the busiest railway stations in the United States, with hundreds of people moving through it each day. When a new post office was built in Nashville in 1935, it was located adjacent to Union Station. A connecting passageway between the two was used to transport mail to and from trains for more than three decades.

The station reached peak usage during World War II when it served as the shipping-out point for tens of thousands of U.S. troops and was the site of a USO canteen. The station's decline started in the 1960s, amid the larger nationwide decline in passenger rail service. As the government increased construction of interstates and other highways - and the cost of the personal vehicle became more affordable - passenger services on the railways began to decline rapidly. By the end of the decade, the L&N was the only railroad using the station. Only six trains per day stopped there, down from 16 in the late 1940s.

The primary passenger trains through Nashville over the years included:

Operators	Named trains	Western or northern destination	Eastern or southern destination	Year discontinued
Amtrak	Floridian	Chicago	St. Petersburg, Florida; Miami sections separating in Wildwood, Florida	1979
Chicago and Eastern Illinois, Louisville & Nashville	Dixie Flagler	Chicago and alternate section originating in St. Louis Union Station	Miami via Atlanta	1957
Chicago and Eastern Illinois, Louisville & Nashville	Dixie Flyer	Chicago and alternate section originating in St. Louis Union Station	Miami via Atlanta	1965
Chicago and Eastern Illinois, Louisville & Nashville	Dixieland	Chicago and alternate section originating in St. Louis Union Station	Miami via Atlanta	1957
Chicago and Eastern Illinois, Louisville & Nashville	Georgian	Chicago and alternate section originating in St. Louis Union Station	Atlanta	1971
Louisville & Nashville, Pennsylvania Railroad; Atlantic Coast Line; Florida East Coast	Florida Arrow	Chicago	Miami, Florida; Sarasota and St. Petersburg sections	1949
Louisville & Nashville	Humming Bird	Cincinnati, Ohio via Louisville	New Orleans via Birmingham	1969
Louisville & Nashville	Pan-American	Cincinnati, Ohio via Louisville	New Orleans via Birmingham	1971
Louisville & Nashville	South Wind	Chicago	St. Petersburg and Miami	1971
Nashville, Chattanooga & St. Louis	City of Memphis	Memphis	[terminus]	1958
Southern Railway, Tennessee Central	Carolina Special	[terminus]	Goldsboro, North Carolina; Charleston, South Carolina	ca. 1948

=== Decline ===
Amtrak took over intercity service on May 1, 1971. For much of 1971, Nashville was severed from the national rail network. On November 14, 1971, Amtrak began running a single route through Nashville, the Floridian, successor of the South Wind, with service once in each direction between Chicago and–via a split in Wildwood, Florida–St. Petersburg and Miami. However, the Floridian made its final run on October 9, 1979, after being plagued by rampant delays. The last train to call at Union Station was a southbound Floridian, ending over 120 years of intercity rail service in Nashville. Many of its open spaces were roped off, and its architectural features became largely a habitat for pigeons for several years.

After it closed, the station fell into the custody of the federal government's General Services Administration, which struggled for years to find a viable redevelopment plan as the station continued to decline. Nashville locals continuously rejected plans that did not include retaining the main terminal building.

=== Redevelopment ===
The site remained vacant until 1986 when a group of investors worked together to turn it into a luxury hotel with 125 luxury rooms and 12 suites. The hotel plan was based on the use of "junk bond" financing, and the interest payments were so high the hotel required 90% occupancy at an average room rate of $135 per night to break even. This was not a supportable business model in the 1980s Nashville hotel market, and the project soon went bankrupt, calling the future of the station into question again. However, a new investor group bought the hotel in bankruptcy and was able to operate profitably without charging exorbitant room rates or requiring such a high occupancy rate due to the lower cost basis.

More problematic was the effort to find a modern use for the massive trainshed adjacent to the terminal building. Said to be the largest of its kind in the world at the time and an engineering masterpiece, the structure continued to deteriorate. Several suggested plans, including one to raise it up to street level (from the cut level) and turn it into a farmers' market, never came to fruition. A fire damaged the structure in 1996, and it was eventually demolished in late 2000 after several years of failing to come up with a viable preservation plan.

Since the site's conversion to a hotel in 1986, Union Station has undergone several renovations. The first occurred in 2007 and cost $11 million. An additional $1.9 million of upgrades were made in 2012 when the hotel became a Marriott Autograph Collection hotel. In 2014, Pebblebrook Hotel Trust bought Union Station Hotel for $52.3 million and hired Gobbell Hays Partners, Inc., to design renovations that ultimately cost $15.5 million. Southwest Value Partners now own and manage the Hotel.

The restoration led through the partnership of Southwest Value Partners and Gobbel Hays Partners focused on preserving the station’s historic Romanesque Revival architecture while incorporating modern elements. Key updates included ADA-compliant elevations designs, custom bi-fold windows for open-air dining, and meticulous cleaning and preservation of the hotel's limestone masonry. Original architectural details, colors, and motifs were integrated into the design, with historic granite stairs uncovered and the original entrance restored. This revitalization of Union Station has reinforced its role as a gateway to the city of Nashville, blending its rich architectural history with contemporary functionality.

=== Historical landmark ===
Many efforts were extended towards the preservation of Union Station and its importance to the city of Nashville. Notable figures include Mrs. William Coke and Mrs. Fred Cowden, who worked with the Tennessee Historical Commission. They are most recognized for their establishment of the daylong workshop advocating for the station's preservation called S.O.S., or "Save Our Station".

The additional efforts of Historic Nasvhille, Inc. (HNI), beginning in 1975, were instrumental in the salvation and restoration of this important structure. The Junior League of Nashville, led by Fletch Coke, worked to organize a historical recount of the station, which culminated in the publication of Speaking of Union Station: An Oral History of a Nashville Landmark. The book was based on the interviews of 112 different individuals, ranging from travelers and local residents to railroad and station employees, and proceeds from its sale went to the Union Station Trust Fund.

Along with the adjoining trainshed, Union Station became a National Historic Landmark in 1976. However, its historical landmark status was withdrawn in 2003 due to the fire damage to the trainshed that occurred in 1996 and ultimately led to the demolition of that part of the property. Union Station remains on the National Register of Historic Places (listed in 1969) for its local relevance to the city of Nashville and the state of Tennessee.

== Architecture and interior ==
The station is an example of late-Victorian Romanesque Revival architecture and has high towers and turrets that are reminiscent of a castle. The tower originally contained an early mechanical digital clock, but it was replaced by a traditional analog clock when replacement French silk drive belts became unavailable during World War I. The original bronze statue of the Roman god Mercury that sat on top of the tower was toppled in the Tornado outbreak of March 21–22, 1952 but was later replaced in the mid-1990s with a two-dimensional form painted in trompe-l'œil style to replicate the original. This second Mercury was destroyed in the 1998 downtown Nashville tornado but was also replaced.

The décor in the hotel includes features like three crystal chandeliers, Italian marble floors, wrought iron accents, oak-accented doors, and three limestone fireplaces, along with a 65-foot, barrel-vaulted, stained glass lobby ceiling. The walls are covered with art, including numerous bas-relief sculptures. The two sculptures known as "Miss Nashville" and "Miss Louisville" are said to be images of two of the builder's daughters. Other bas-reliefs depict various historical modes of transportation. Some of the station's original tile remains in the hotel's bar and restaurant area. The station also featured some absurd attractions, for example, the infamous alligator pools that found their home in the train station's lobby.

== See also ==
- Dixiana (passenger train)
- Dixie Flagler
- Humming Bird (passenger train)
- Pan-American (passenger train)
- Tennessean (passenger train)
