= Meadowlark (train) =

Passenger train formerly operated by the Chicago and Eastern Illinois Railroad

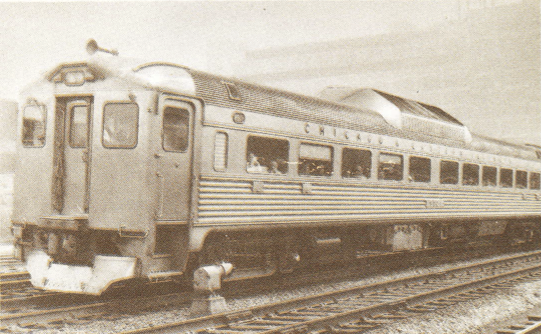
- The Meadowlark in 1957, after a Budd Rail Diesel Car replaced the streamlined equipment.

Overview
- First service: October 6, 1946
- Last service: January 5, 1962
- Former operator: Chicago and Eastern Illinois Railroad

The Meadowlark was a streamlined passenger train operated by the Chicago and Eastern Illinois Railroad between Chicago, Illinois and Cypress, Illinois. It operated from 1946 to 1962. The Meadowlark was the C&EI's last train to Southern Illinois.

== History ==
The Meadowlark was one of two new streamliners introduced by the C&EI in late 1946, the other being the short-lived Whippoorwill which served Evansville, Indiana. The C&EI billed the train as a "Chicago-liner" and promised "quieter, smoother, roomier lounge-car luxury." The new streamliner made the 345-mile (555 km) journey from Chicago to Cypress, Illinois in seven hours. The train departed Cypress at 5:15 AM, arriving at Chicago's Dearborn Station at 12:25 PM. Five hours later the train began the journey back to Cypress, arriving after midnight. Writing in 2006, railroad historian Joe Welsh called the Meadowlark "inviting" while noting that the destination of Cypress was "obscure." On the train's first anniversary the C&EI claimed total ridership of 150,000 passengers and that the train had "girdled the globe 10 times in her daily travels."

In the early 1950s the Meadowlark continued south to Joppa, on the Ohio River, but by the middle of the decade it was cut back to West Vienna, Illinois, 6 miles (9.7 km) north of Cypress. The C&EI discontinued the Meadowlark altogether on January 5, 1962, ending the railroad's service to Southern Illinois.

== Equipment ==
Pullman-Standard delivered four cars for the original Meadowlark: a baggage/mail/grill car (the Sparhawk Inn) and three 60-seat coaches. In 1956 the C&EI replaced the streamlined equipment with a Budd Rail Diesel Car (RDC). In a 1957 company publication C&EI touted the "comfort and speed" of the RDC and touted its suitability for operation in "sparsely settled areas." While the language echoed earlier advertisements, the downgrade was obvious.
