= Dixie Flyer (train) =

Former American passenger rail service

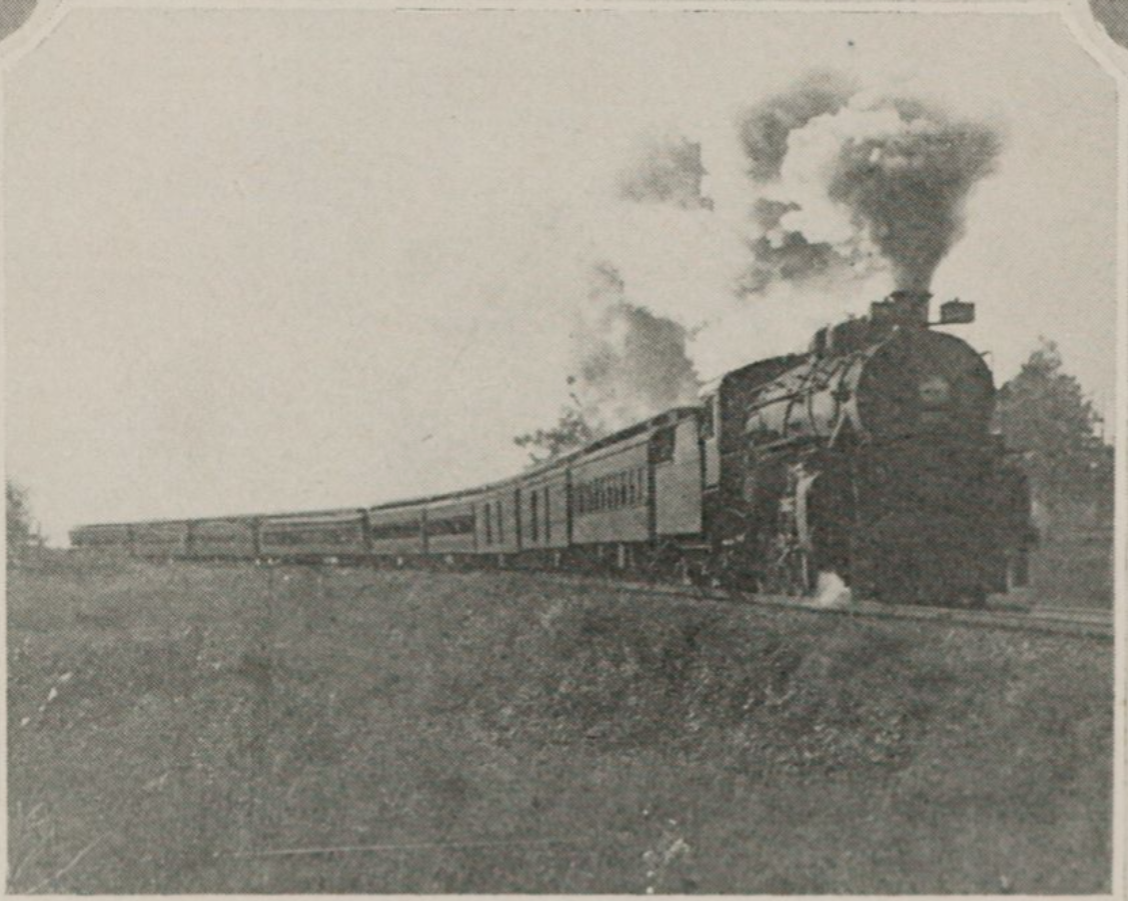
- The Dixie Flyer in 1924, just outside of Atlanta

Overview
- Service type: Inter-city rail
- Status: Discontinued
- Locale: Midwestern United States/Southeastern United States
- First service: 1892
- Last service: 1969
- Former operator(s): Chicago and Eastern Illinois Railroad, Louisville and Nashville Railroad, Nashville, Chattanooga and St. Louis Railway, Central of Georgia Railway, Atlantic Coast Line Railroad/Seaboard Coast Line Railroad, and Florida East Coast Railway

Route
- Termini: Chicago; Miami
- Distance travelled: 1,454 miles (2,340 km) (1949)
- Service frequency: Daily (1949)
- Train number(s): Southbound: 95; Northbound: 94

On-board services
- Seating arrangements: Reclining seat coaches
- Sleeping arrangements: Sections, compartments and drawing rooms
- Catering facilities: Dining car
- Baggage facilities: Baggage car

Technical
- Rolling stock: Streamlined passenger cars by Pullman Standard
- Track gauge: 4 ft 8 1/2 in (1,435 mm)

The Dixie Flyer was a premier named American passenger train that operated from 1892 to 1965 via the "Dixie Route" from Chicago and St. Louis via Evansville, Nashville, and Atlanta to Florida. However, the train continued until 1969 as an Atlanta to Florida operation, run solely by the Atlantic Coast Line Railroad and its successor, the Seaboard Coast Line. The Flyer's route varied in early years, but by about 1920 was set as follows:

- Chicago and Eastern Illinois (C&EI), Chicago (Dearborn Station) to Evansville (Louisville and Nashville Railroad Station), or
- Louisville and Nashville (L&N), St. Louis to Evansville section
- Louisville and Nashville, Evansville to Nashville (Nashville Union Station)
- Nashville, Chattanooga and St. Louis (NC&StL), Nashville to Atlanta (Atlanta Union Station)
- Central of Georgia (CofG), Atlanta to Albany (Albany Union Station), via Macon
- Atlantic Coast Line (ACL), Albany to Jacksonville
- Florida East Coast (FEC), Jacksonville to Miami, or
- Atlantic Coast Line, Jacksonville to Tampa and Sarasota, and Jacksonville to St. Petersburg sections

== History ==
After the NC&StL acquired the lease of the Western and Atlantic Railroad in 1890, it began promoting its passenger business from northern connections through Tennessee, and in early 1892 christened its existing trains 1 and 2 from Nashville to Atlanta as the Dixie Flyer, with through Pullman Palace sleeping cars from Nashville to Jacksonville; these at first were routed south of Atlanta via the East Tennessee, Virginia and Georgia Railway (controlled by the Southern Railway), and later rerouted via the CofG and ACL.

In 1899, the NC&StL made an agreement with the Illinois Central (IC) to handle passengers via the IC from Chicago and from St. Louis, via Fulton, Kentucky and Martin, Tennessee on the Dixie Flyer with limited stops and a fast schedule. In 1908, the Chicago traffic was rerouted via the CE&I from Chicago to Evansville, and the L&N from Evansville to Nashville; during World War I, the L&N also took over the traffic from St. Louis to Evansville. Soon after the war ended, the route south of Atlanta to Jacksonville was settled on the CofG to Macon and Albany, and from there via the ACL via Tifton and Waycross. In Jacksonville, through Pullmans were handed over to the FEC for Miami or to other ACL trains for Tampa and other west coast (Gulf of Mexico) points.

At the height of the Florida land boom in 1925, the popular Dixie Flyer was split into three sections: the all-Pullman Dixie Flyer from Chicago/St. Louis to Florida; the coaches and Atlanta and Augusta sleepers were carried on the second section, named the Dixie Express; mail and express went by the third section, the Dixie Mail. Following the collapse of the Florida boom and the effects of the Great Depression, services were cut back in the 1930s, with the Flyer handling both coaches and Pullmans.

A short-lived Jacksonville-Yellowstone National Park Pullman route was created in the summer of 1925, carrying a sleeper via the Dixie Flyer to St. Louis, via the Wabash to Kansas City, and via the Union Pacific to West Yellowstone.

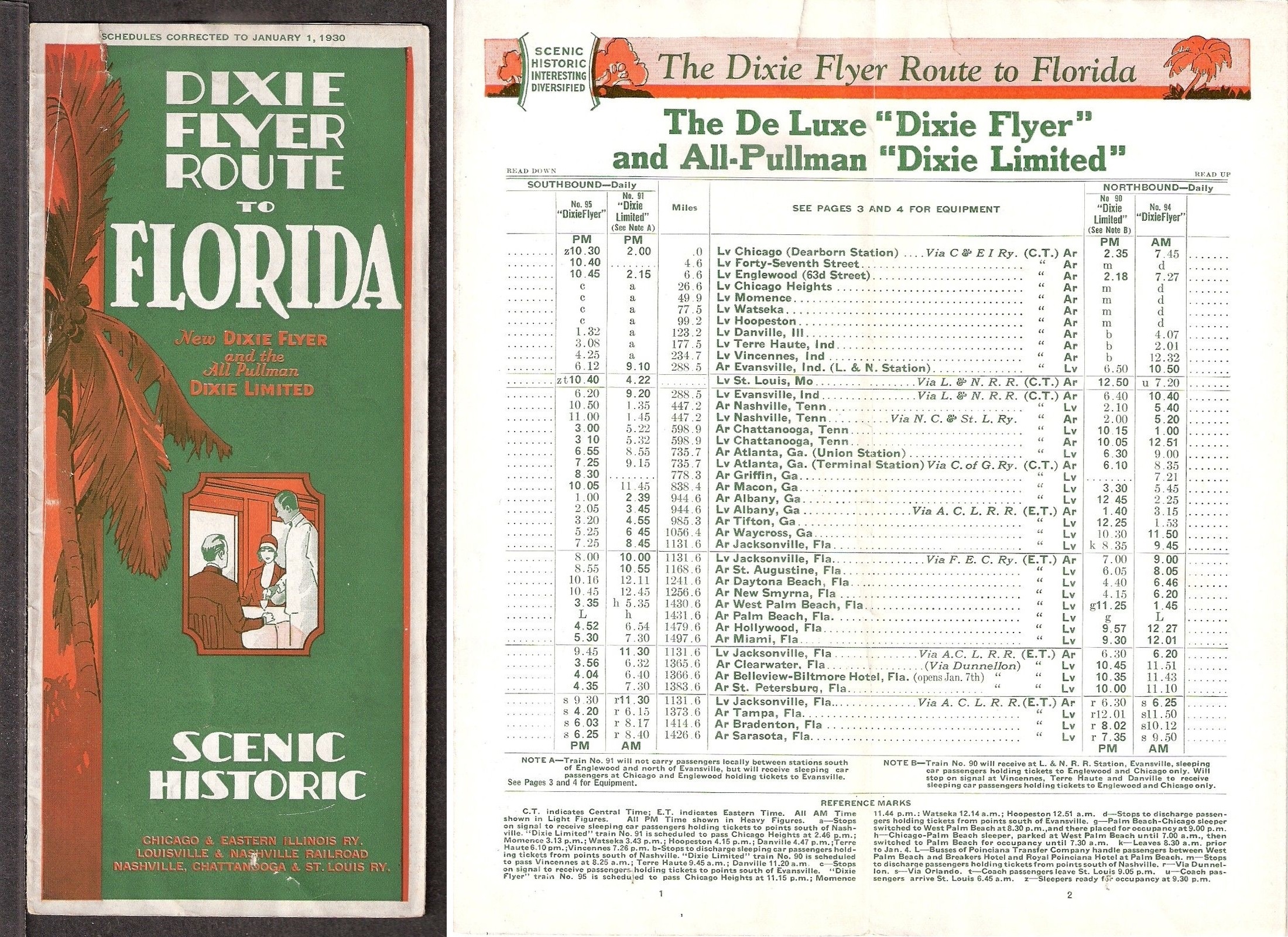
Dixie Route brochure with timetables for the Dixie Flyer and Dixie Limited, 1930.

By the postwar 1940s, the Florida East Coast Railway route along the coast was carried by the Atlantic Coast Line's Miamian. The other sections to St. Petersburg, Tampa and Sarasota were covered by ACL local trains. By the mid-1950s, the Atlantic Coast Line terminated the route at Jacksonville, including the sleeping cars. Passengers wishing to continue on the traditional Florida East Coast route to Miami would need to transfer to the ACL's East Coast Champion.

The Dixie Flyer was discontinued north of Atlanta by December 1965, From 1965 the Atlantic Coast Line RR (and then its successor, the Seaboard Coast Line Railroad) kept the train running on the route from Atlanta Union Station south to Jacksonville, on an overnight schedule, but without sleeping cars. The train was finally discontinued on January 8, 1969. Like many other passenger trains a victim of plummeting ridership in the face of airline and highway competition.

== Major stops ==
The following were major stops. Precise stops are in the diagram map at the right.

- Chicago
- St. Louis (the Chicago and St. Louis branches converged in Evansville)
- Terre Haute
- Evansville
- Nashville
- Tullahoma
- Chattanooga
- Dalton
- Atlanta
- Albany
- Jacksonville
- West Palm Beach
- Fort Lauderdale
- Miami

Separate connecting Atlantic Coast Line branches from Jacksonville served Gainesville, Orlando, Tampa, St. Petersburg, Sarasota and Fort Myers.

== Dixie Route trains ==
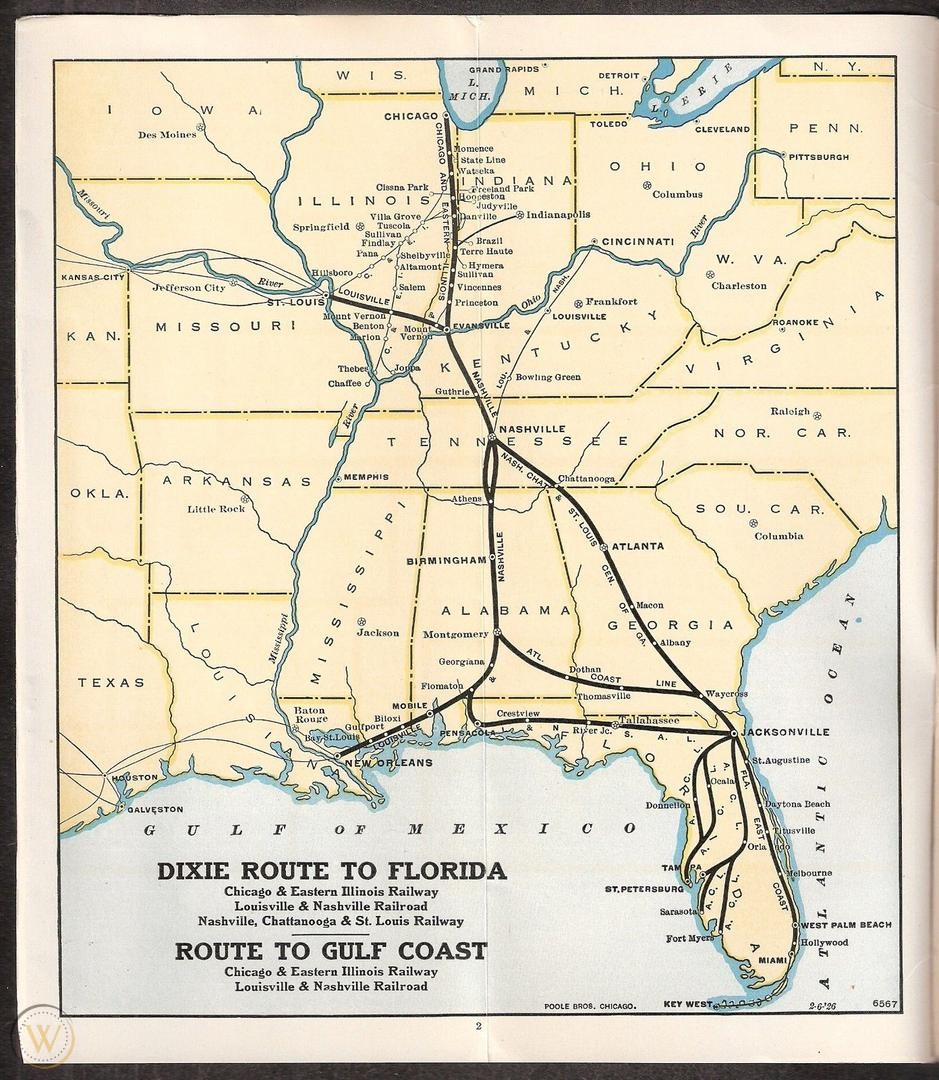
Map of the Dixie Route to Florida and connecting lines, published by the C&EI, L&N, and NC&StL railroads, 1926.

Other trains from the Midwest to Florida using the Dixie Route included:

- Dixie Flagler (streamliner)
- Dixiana
- Dixie Limited
- Dixieland
- Dixie Express
- Dixie Mail
- Southland (diverged from the Dixie Flyer route at Albany, Georgia, where it followed the Perry Cutoff to reach Tampa and St. Petersburg)
