= Terre Haute station (Amtrak) =

Terre Haute, IN
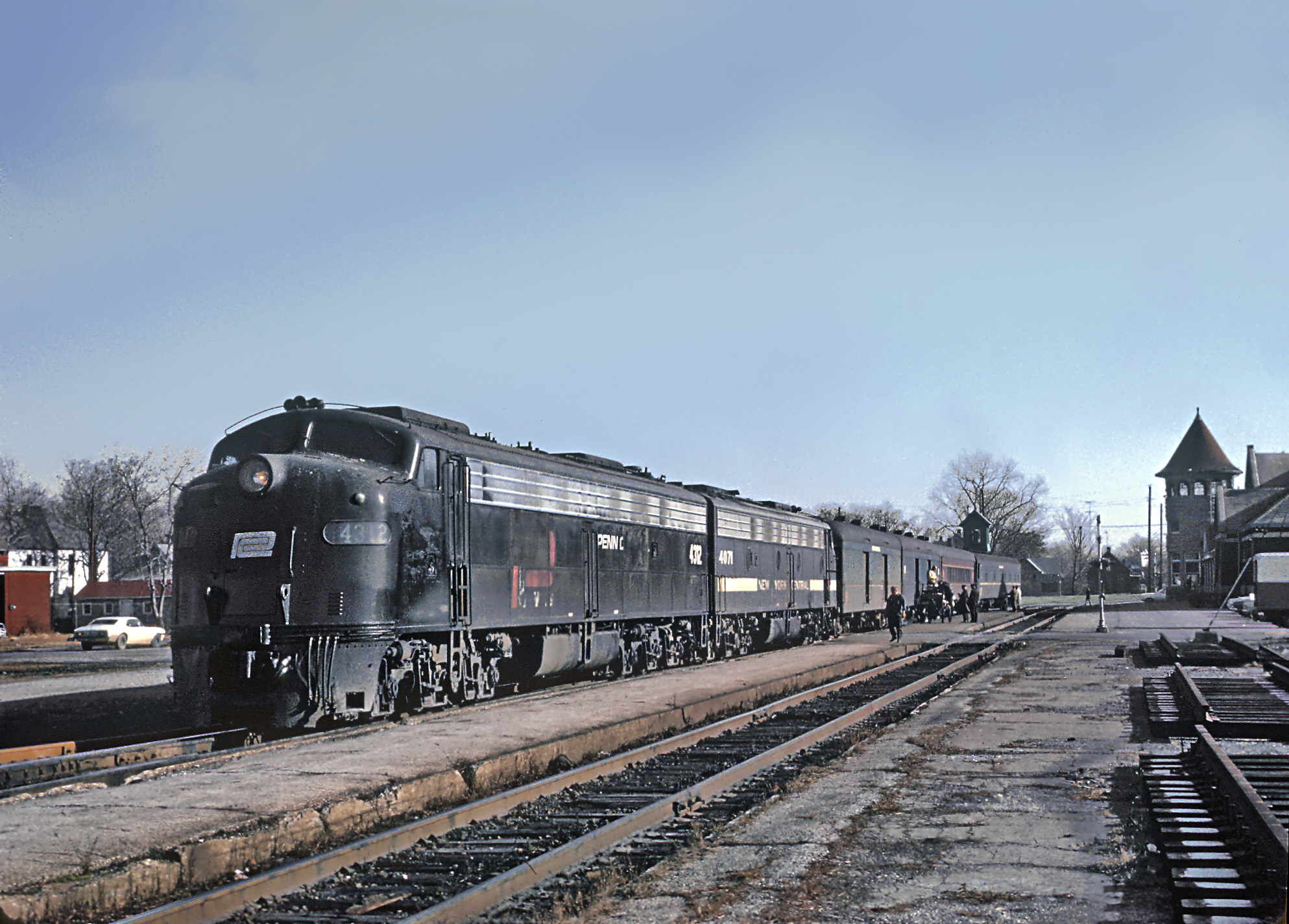
- The Spirit of St. Louis at Terre Haute in 1970

General information
- Location: 700 North 7th Street; Terre Haute, Indiana
- Coordinates: 39°28′31″N 87°24′27″W

History
- Opened: July 27, 1899; March 1, 1969 (Note: Relocated from Terre Haute Union Station)
- Closed: February 1, 1968 (Note: Withdrawn by Penn Central in favor of ex-Pennsylvania Railroad line); October 1, 1979

Former services
Preceding station	Amtrak	Following station
Effingham toward Kansas City	National Limited	Indianapolis toward New York or Washington, D.C.
Preceding station	New York Central Railroad	Following station
St. Louis Terminus	Big Four Route Main Line	Indianapolis toward Cleveland
St. Mary of the Woods toward St. Louis	Big Four Route Main Line	Markles toward Cleveland
Riley toward Evansville	Evansville, Indianapolis and Terre Haute Railway	Terminus

Terre Haute station, also known as the Big Four Depot, was a train station in Terre Haute, Indiana.

Construction on the Big Four Railroad station started in 1898 and it opened to passengers on July 27, 1899. The station served Big Four (Cleveland, Cincinnati, Chicago and St. Louis Railway) trains, and after the railroad was absorbed into the New York Central, it served trains under that name.

The station was on the New York Central's St. Louis - Indianapolis - Cleveland corridor, and it served several named trains on that route. The trains heading toward Cleveland included Missourian (St. Louis - New York City, with a section to Detroit), Southwestern Limited (St. Louis - New York City), as well as named and unnamed trains running strictly between St. Louis and Cleveland.

The Amtrak National Limited (Kansas City–New York City and Washington, D.C.) ceased operation on October 1, 1979, ending rail service to the city. It was demolished in 1986.

== See also ==
- Terre Haute Union Station
