= Rennert railroad accident =

1943 train wreck in the USA

Coordinates: 34°45′06″N 79°07′46″W

The Rennert railroad accident occurred in Rennert, North Carolina, on December 16, 1943. Seventy four people were killed when the northbound Tamiami Champion, an Atlantic Coast Line Railroad passenger train, struck the rear two cars of its southbound counterpart, which had derailed. It remains the deadliest train wreck ever in North Carolina.

== Derailment ==
The southbound Tamiami Champion, consisting of 18 cars and three locomotives, departed Fayetteville, 20.5 miles (33.0 km) north of Rennert, at 12:25 am, over an hour late. While traveling at 85 miles per hour (137 km/h), its rear three cars derailed and separated from the rest of the train.

All three cars remained upright, but the rear two—a dining car and a Pullman sleeping car—fouled the northbound track. The enginemen (traveling in the locomotive) became aware of a problem when the emergency brakes were automatically applied and the front part of the train came to a halt nearly 1/2 mi (0.80 km) beyond the derailed cars, at about 12:50 am. The brakeman (traveling in the derailed rearmost car) evacuated the passengers from the derailed cars and showed a light to inform the men working the front of the train that it had parted.

A passenger offered to protect the northbound track but the flagman said that the crew in the front of the train would do so; the brakeman then proceeded north to provide flag protection.

Meanwhile, the enginemen, investigating the cause of the brake application, found that the third car had separated from the second. They were still unaware of the derailment further back. The conductor (in the 13th car) saw the light but assumed it had been dropped from the rearmost car. The engineer said that soon after the train stopped he instructed the fireman to provide flag protection on the northbound track while he attempted to repair the broken coupling.

== Collision ==
The fireman proceeded southwards. Upon seeing the headlight of the approaching northbound Tamiami Champion, which had 16 cars and three locomotives and was traveling at 80 mph (130 km/h), he attempted to light a fusee but instead slipped and fell on the icy ballast. He waved stop signals, which were apparently not seen.

After passing the front of the stopped southbound train, the engineer of the northbound train saw stop signals being given by a passenger at the same time he saw the derailed cars, about 1,000 feet (300 m) ahead. Despite applying the emergency brakes, the northbound train collided with the derailed cars.

Of the 74 passengers killed (some sources say 72), most were servicemen on the northbound train, traveling home for the holidays; only one fatality was on the southbound train. Most of the fatalities were in the second and third cars of the northbound train, the latter having come to a stop on top of the former.

== Causes ==
The initial derailment was caused by a rail breaking beneath the train. The subsequent collision could have been prevented if the crew had obeyed operating rules that required a thorough inspection of the train within 40 minutes of the initial derailment and had adequately protected their train using torpedoes.
