= Whippoorwill (train) =

Overview
- First service: 1946
- Last service: 1948
- Former operator: Chicago and Eastern Illinois Railroad

The Whippoorwill was a short-lived passenger train operated by the Chicago and Eastern Illinois Railroad (C&EI) between Chicago, Illinois and Evansville, Indiana.

The C&EI introduced the Whippoorwill in 1946 as a day train supplement to the express streamliners it operated in conjunction with the Louisville and Nashville Railroad (L&N). The Whippoorwill was one of the first new streamliners introduced after World War II, with completely new equipment delivered by Pullman-Standard. A C&EI advertisement in Trains magazine touted the "ultra-modern chair car accommodations" and "latest type passenger Diesel locomotives."

The train's original consist, as delivered by Pullman-Standard, included the following cars:

Number	Type	Name	Disposition
#304	Baggage-coach	Turkey Run	Sold to the Shedd Aquarium and used as a fish transport. Now at the Monticello Railway Museum.
#460	Coach	Vigo Trail	Sold to the Illinois Central Railroad (IC) in 1961; converted to maintenance of way in 1971.
#461	Coach	Vincennes Trail	Sold to the IC in 1961; destroyed in a derailment involving the City of New Orleans in 1971.
#462	Coach	Vanderburg Trail	Sold to the IC in 1961; sold to Silcott Railroad Equipment in 1971.
#463	Coach	Vermillion Trail	Sold to the IC in 1961. Sold to Black Hills Central Railroad in 1971. Sold to the Oregon, Pacific and Eastern Railway (OP&E) after 1971; possibly 1972 and no later than 1975. Sold to Louisiana and Arkansas Railway (LA) in 1975 and named "Sierra Madre."
#505	Diner	Shakamak Inn	Sold to the IC in 1962. Conveyed to the Louisiana Arts and Sciences Center in Baton Rouge. Now at the Monticello Railway Museum.
#702	Parlor observation	Chicagoland	Rebuilt as a coach in 1964.

A famous publicity photograph, which the C&EI used long after the train's discontinuance, showed a single EMD E7 locomotive (#1102), leading these seven cars which made up the train's original consist. The photograph was colorized to accentuate the train's blue and yellow color scheme. The northbound train (#4) departed Evansville at 7:00 am and arrived in Chicago's Dearborn Station at 12:20 pm. The train then returned south (as #3) at 5:30 pm, arriving in Evansville at 10:50 pm.

The C&EI discontinued the Whippoorwill in 1948 after the L&N began running a section of the Georgian to Chicago over a similar schedule. The C&EI reassigned the Whippoorwill's equipment to the Georgian and the Humming Bird until finally selling most of it to the Illinois Central in the early 1960s.
