= Meadowlark Park =

Meadowlark Park may refer to various communities in Alberta, Canada, named for the meadowlark bird:

- Meadowlark Park, Edmonton
- West Meadowlark Park, Edmonton
- Meadowlark Park, Calgary
