= Lounge car =

Train car where passengers can purchase food or drink

A lounge car (sometimes referred to as a buffet lounge, buffet car, club car, café car, or grill car) is a type of passenger car on a train, in which riders can purchase food and drinks. The car may feature large windows and comfortable train seats to create a relaxing diversion from standard coach or dining options. In earlier times (and especially on the "name" trains), a lounge car was more likely to have a small kitchen, or grill and a limited menu. Food was prepared to order and often cooked, though items such as club sandwiches would have usually been part of the offerings. The cars were often operated by the Pullman Company, and in other cases by the railroad directly as part of the dining car department (on the Atchison, Topeka and Santa Fe Railway the Fred Harvey Company operated the food concession).

Lounge cars operated by Pullman were exclusively for the use of sleeping car passengers, while those operated by the railroad were available to coach as well as first-class travelers. Buffet lounge cars were often found in trains which did not offer full dining car service. On other trains they supplemented the diner and offered sandwiches, burgers and short orders at times when the diner was not serving; e.g. mid-afternoon and late night. To qualify as a buffet lounge the car had to offer both food and drink service. Buffet lounges should not be confused with snack or grill cars which did not offer a full range of libations.

In Britain, luxury lounge cars are known as "Pullman" cars, after the American Pullman Company.

== Gallery ==
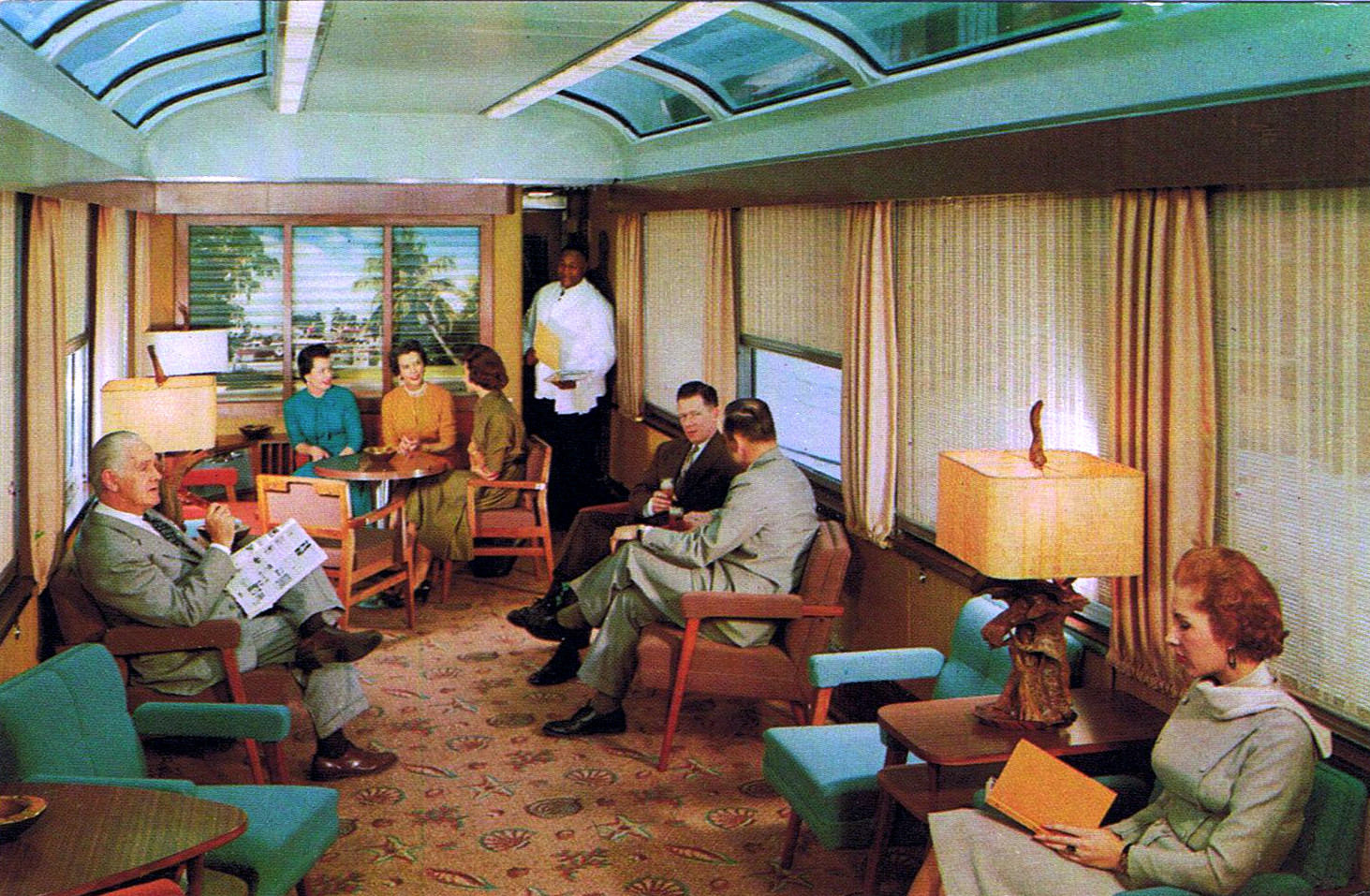
Postcard of a Seaboard Air Line Sun Lounge interior in the 1960s.

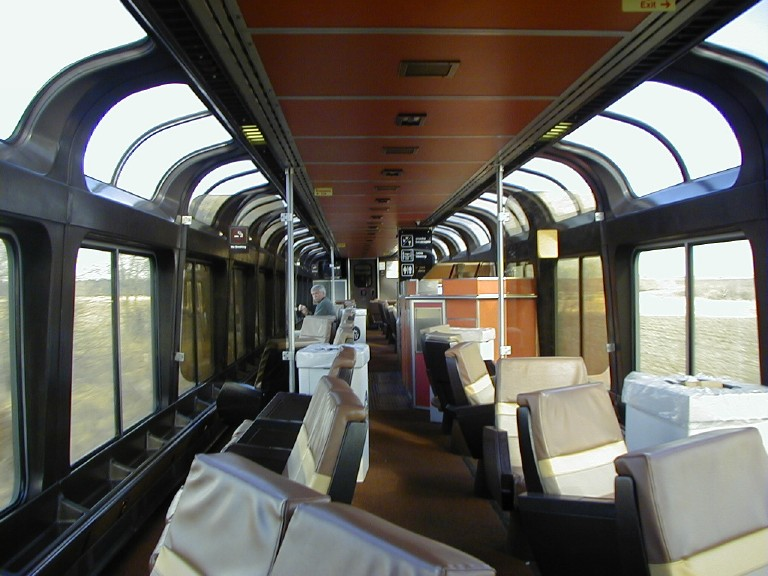
Interior of an Amtrak Superliner Sightseer lounge car. These were based on the Seaboard’s Sun Lounge and the ATSF’s Hi-Level lounge.

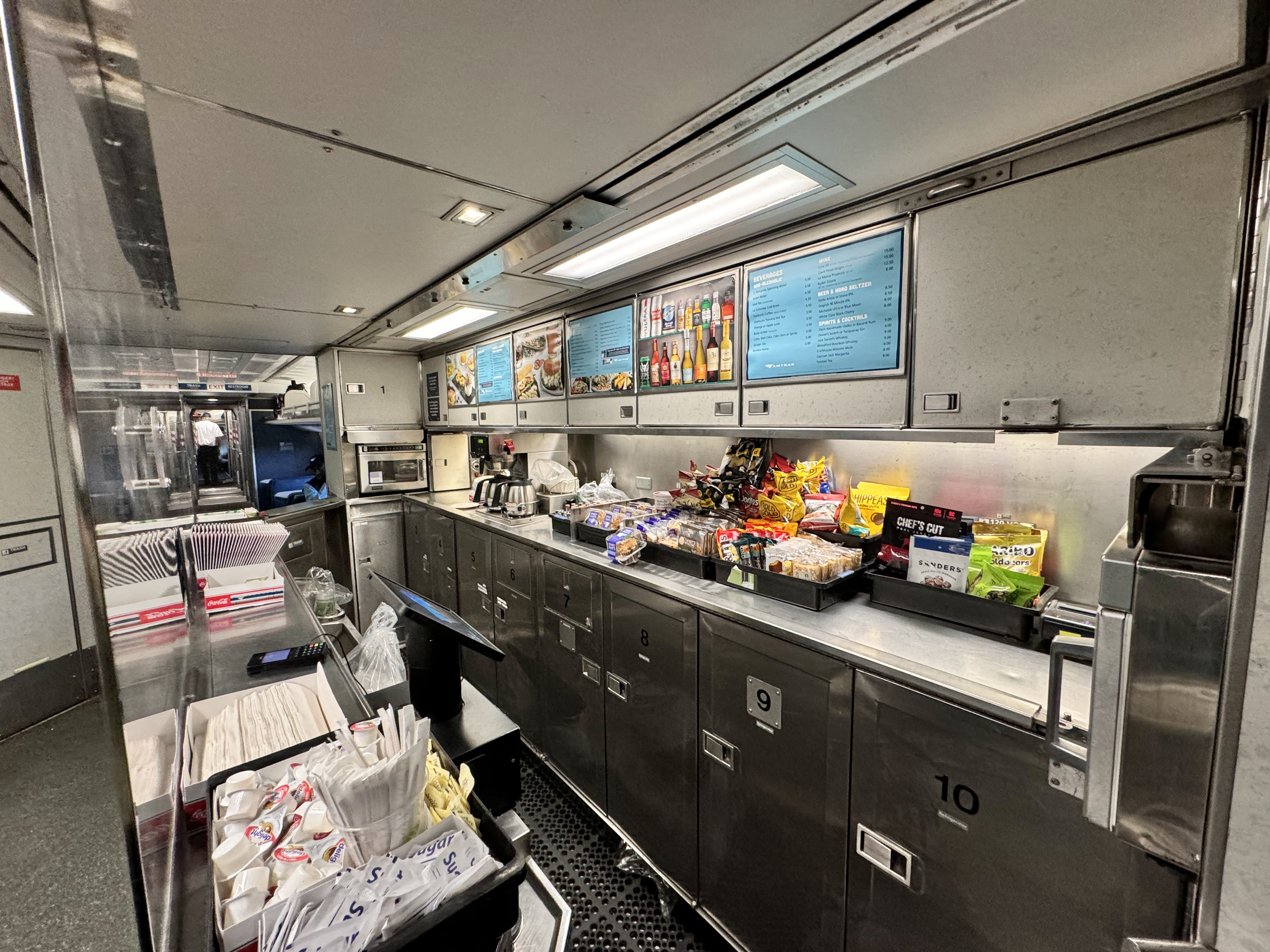
The cafe car food service area aboard Amtrak's Vermonter train

== Tavern-lounge cars ==
Tavern-lounge cars, alternatively called tavern-observation cars, were lounge cars often with partitions, where refreshments were offered for sale. They came in either round-end or flat-end configurations. In use from the post-World War II years, into the 1970s, these appeared on long-distance routes, such as the Atlantic Coast Line's Champion, the Erie Lackawanna's Phoebe Snow, the Kansas City Southern's Southern Belle, Louisville and Nashville's Humming Bird, Georgian, the New York Central's New York-St. Louis Southwestern Limited, and the Seaboard Air Line’s Silver Meteor. As apparent in the ACL's all-coach Vacationer, this sub-class of car was not only used in Pullman trains. Like standard lounge cars, these had seats and couches facing away from windows and toward the aisles. Many of these were equipped with radios with which to play music via radio or recordings. The Seaboard’s Silver Meteor in particular was well known to have kept its tavern-lounge-observation car on the end of the train where it was supposed to be until Amtrak’s inception in 1971. This was after many railroads had discontinued the practice, and would place the car wherever it needed to be in the train.

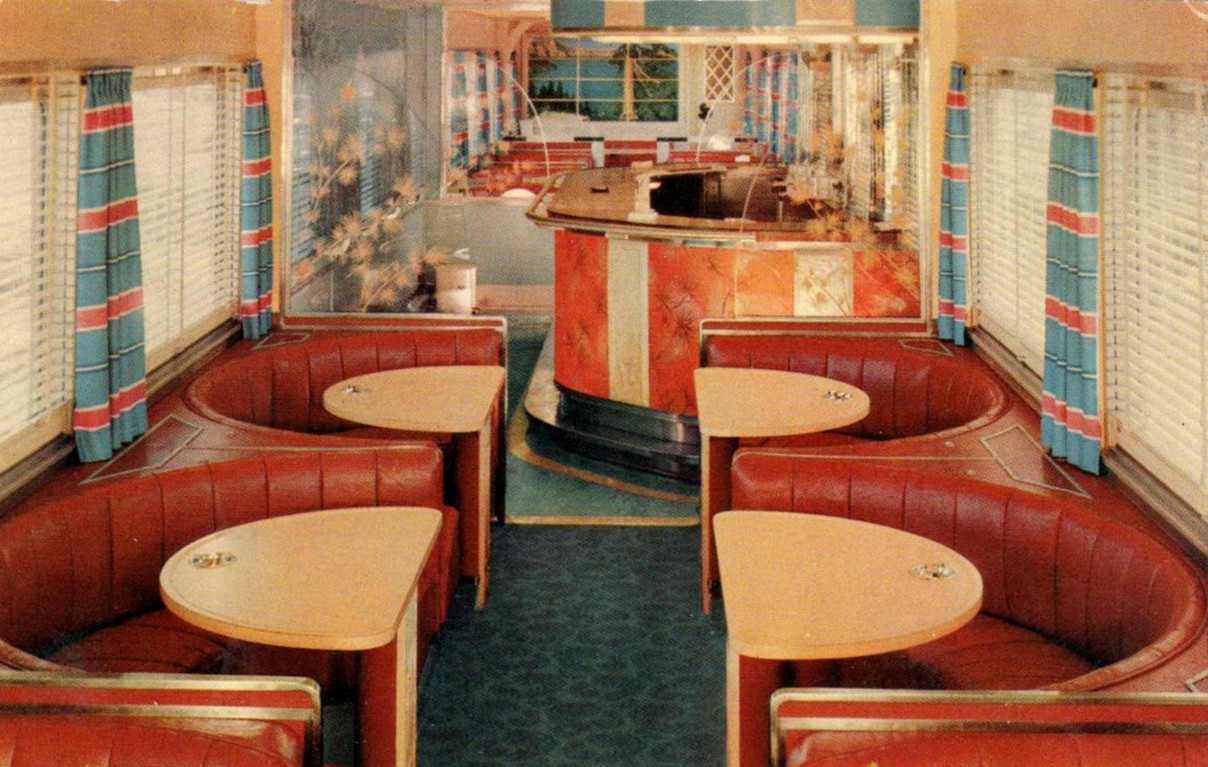
Shasta Daylight Timberline Tavern lounge car

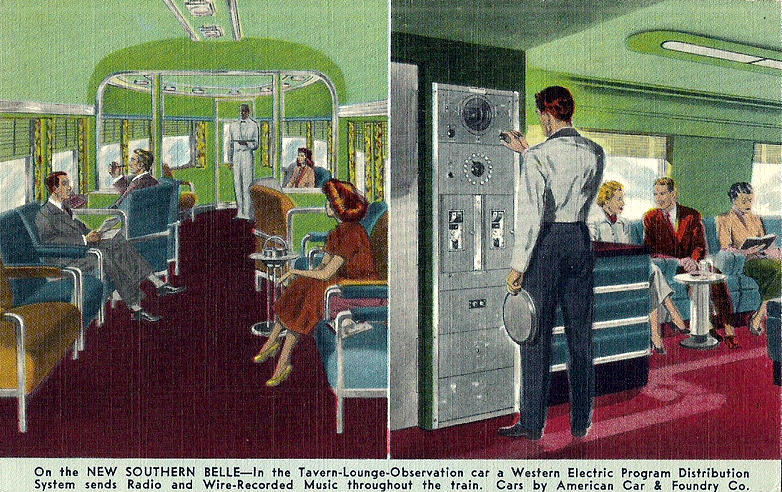
Postcard depiction, circa 1948, of the tavern-observation car. A radio allowed broadcasts and music to be heard throughout the train.

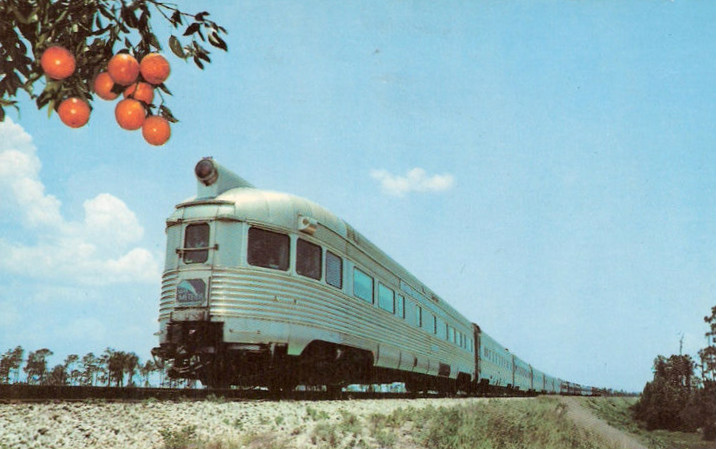
Publicity photo of the Silver Meteor’s round-end tavern-lounge-observation still bringing up the rear in the 1960s.

== See also ==
- Buffet car
- Dining car
- Observation car
