= South Wind (train) =

Former American passenger train

Overview
- Service type: Inter-city rail
- Status: Discontinued
- Locale: Midwestern United States/Southeastern United States
- First service: December 1940
- Last service: November 14, 1971
- Successor: Floridian
- Former operators: Pennsylvania Railroad, Louisville and Nashville Railroad, Atlantic Coast Line Railroad (later Seaboard Coast Line), Florida East Coast Railway; Amtrak

Route
- Termini: Chicago, Illinois; St. Petersburg, Florida; Miami, Florida
- Distance travelled: 1,526 miles (2,456 km) (Chicago-Miami); 1,478 miles (2,379 km) (Chicago-St. Petersburg)
- Average journey time: Southbound: 29 hrs 10 min Northbound: 29 hrs 30 min (1941)
- Service frequency: Every third day
- Train numbers: Southbound: 15; Northbound: 16

On-board services
- Seating arrangements: Reclining seat coaches
- Sleeping arrangements: Original consist was all-coach; Pullmans added in later years
- Catering facilities: Dining car
- Observation facilities: Buffet-Lounge-Observation car
- Baggage facilities: Baggage car

Technical
- Track gauge: 4 ft 8 1/2 in (1,435 mm)

The South Wind was a named passenger train equipped and operated jointly by the Pennsylvania Railroad, the Louisville and Nashville Railroad, the Atlantic Coast Line Railroad (later Seaboard Coast Line), and the Florida East Coast Railway. The South Wind began operations in December 1940, providing streamliner service between Chicago, Illinois and Miami, Florida. This was one of three new seven-car, all-coach streamliners operating in coordination every third day along different routes between Chicago and Miami. The other two longest enduring Chicago-Florida trains were the City of Miami and the Dixie Flagler. The South Wind remained in service through the creation of Amtrak in 1971.

== Route ==
The South Wind departed Chicago Union Station and ran through Logansport and Indianapolis to Louisville Union Station. It then proceeded down the Louisville & Nashville main line through Bowling Green, Nashville, and Birmingham to Montgomery. From Montgomery, it ran down the Atlantic Coast Line through Dothan, Thomasville, Valdosta and Waycross to Jacksonville. The last leg to Miami was over the Florida East Coast. After a number of schedule changes throughout the late 1940s and early 1950s, the train was running every other day opposite the City of Miami, both trains then carrying sleeping cars. By 1955, Florida West Coast service was added, using cars added to the West Coast Champion trains in Jacksonville.

== History ==
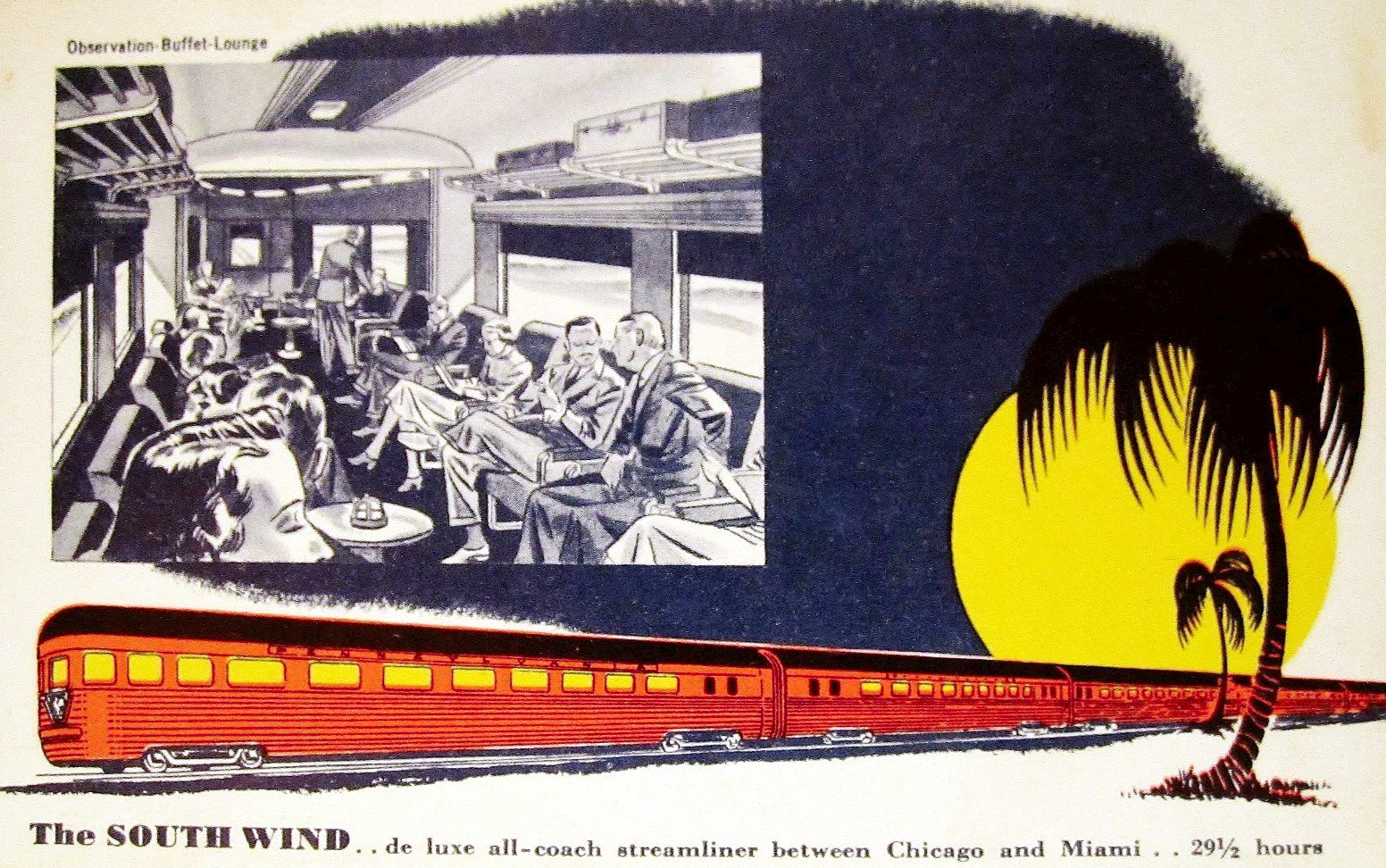
Postcard ad for the train, circa 1940s.

The train, beginning service in December 1940, used a seven-car trainset built by the Budd Company. The set, which did not include sleepers, was similar to trains built for the Seaboard Air Line's New York-Miami Silver Meteor and the Southern's New York-New Orleans Southerner, except that it was painted in the Pennsylvania's Tuscan Red, which required special preparation of the stainless steel that composed the cars' sides.

The South Wind, like most trains that operated in the South, was racially segregated. As required by law in Southern states the train passed through, the combination baggage/coach – colloquially called the "colored coach" – was reserved for black passengers. Blacks were not allowed in the observation lounge and were restricted to two tables behind a curtain in the dining car. The curtains came down after President Truman's 1948 mandate forced railway dining cars to integrate; however, dining car stewards still refused to seat blacks and whites at the same table for many years afterwards.

The South Wind ran every third day between its respective endpoint cities, in coordination with the Dixie Flagler (an FEC-owned train that used the Chicago and Eastern Illinois Railroad (C&EI), L&N, Nashville, Chattanooga and St. Louis Railway (NC&STL), Atlanta, Birmingham and Coast Railroad (AB&C), ACL and FEC) and the City of Miami—another colorful seven car Illinois Central Railroad train, which ran south of Birmingham by the Central of Georgia Railway and ACL to Jacksonville, then on to Miami via the FEC.

Additionally, when service was initiated, there were actually three every-third-day trains on each route. The Dixie Flagler was accompanied by the Dixiana; the South Wind by the Florida Arrow and Jacksonian; and the City of Miami by the Sunchaser and the Floridan (note absence of the second "i"). These alternate trains were not lightweight, all-coach consists like the three new streamliners. This coordination enabled passengers to have the convenience of daily service all along their respective routes between Chicago and Miami. The additional two trains per route were discontinued during World War II.

Originally the coordinated schedules of the three streamliners left Chicago in the morning, arriving Miami early the next afternoon. The trains were quickly turned and left Miami in the late afternoon arriving back in Chicago just before bedtime the next day. After World War II, the Dixieland (nee Dixie Flagler), Sunchaser and Florida Arrow were reinstated. Upon their discontinuation, the City of Miami and South Wind trains began running two days out of three. However, the tight Miami turnaround hampered operations, and after adding trainsets, the City of Miami and South Wind changed to every-other-day operation. The Dixie Flyer remained every third day. In 1954, the latter train was re-equipped and renamed the "new" Dixieland. At least into the mid-1960s, the Chicago segment was supplemented by a segment north of Louisville that continued to Cincinnati. While initially, it was a coach-only service, by the 1950s its consists included modern sleeping cars.

In December 1957 both the Dixie Flagler and the Southland were discontinued. The Southland had run daily from various Midwestern cities, through Atlanta and Albany, directly to the Florida west coast cities of Tampa and St. Petersburg, thus bypassing Jacksonville. However, since 1955, west coast cars were added to the City of Miami and South Wind, and they had already begun to serve the west Florida market. These cars were attached to the West Coast Champion sections going from Jacksonville to Tampa-Sarasota and to St. Petersburg via Trilby, which is now largely dismantled. After the merger of the ACL and Seaboard, the combined Seaboard Coast Line changed the west coast operations, in April 1968, to the single section to St. Petersburg with a motor connection to Tampa.

The 1963 strike of non-operating unions on the Florida East Coast Railway resulted in the abrupt end of all passenger services on that railroad. While passenger trains would return in two short E9-powered consists that operated due to a requirement in FEC's charter to provide such trains, the South Wind along with other named trains such as the City of Miami, Florida Special and East Coast Champion shifted from using the FEC Railway coastal route to use internal lines: the Atlantic Coast Line's Jacksonville-Palatka-Tampa main line between Jacksonville and Auburndale (a town adjacent to Winter Haven) and the Seaboard Air Line route from Auburdale to Miami. This would be a harbinger of the future with the upcoming Seaboard Coast Line (July 1, 1967) merger and the eventual operation of this train by Amtrak.

While the train grew in size throughout the 1940s, and 1950s, the 1960s saw the decline that caught most passenger trains in the United States. The Pennsylvania Railroad merged in 1968 with the New York Central to form Penn Central. Over time, the PC became increasingly hostile to passenger service, much like the Southern Pacific was at the time. Unlike the SP, the PC's passenger services–especially outside the Northeast Corridor–were noted for their poor quality. The increasingly cash-strapped PC made consistent efforts to reduce its passenger services outside the Northeast.

The South Wind was not immune and the PC stopped handling it between Chicago and Louisville in December 1969, choosing instead to operate a coach only connection. This left the L&N and SCL to carry on the truncated service until May 1, 1971, when Amtrak assumed responsibility for the provision of passenger services over the L&N, SCL, and Penn Central, among others.

=== Amtrak ===
Amtrak made the South Wind a daily service. Under Amtrak the South Wind departed Chicago's Central Station in the morning and arrived in St. Petersburg, Florida or Miami, Florida late afternoon the following day. Total trip time was 33–34 hours, depending on the endpoints. The itinerary varied slightly. Whereas Van Station (Logansport) was the west-central Indiana stop for the earlier PRR version of the train, Amtrak made Lafayette station the west-central Indiana stop. On November 14, 1971, Amtrak renamed the train the Floridian, and changed it to a two-night schedule: trains would leave Union Station in the late evening and arrive in Florida the morning of the third day. The Floridian was discontinued in 1979 as part of the Federal budget cuts that year that impacted several major Amtrak routes.

== Bibliography ==
- Prince, Richard E. Louisville and Nashville Steam Locomotives, 1968 rev. ed. Bloomington: Indiana University Press, 2000 (reprint). ISBN 978-0-253-33764-1 (Includes photographs, route map, and timetable of the South Wind on pp. 161–164; see Google Books preview.)
