= Champion (train) =

Former passenger train in the US

The Champion
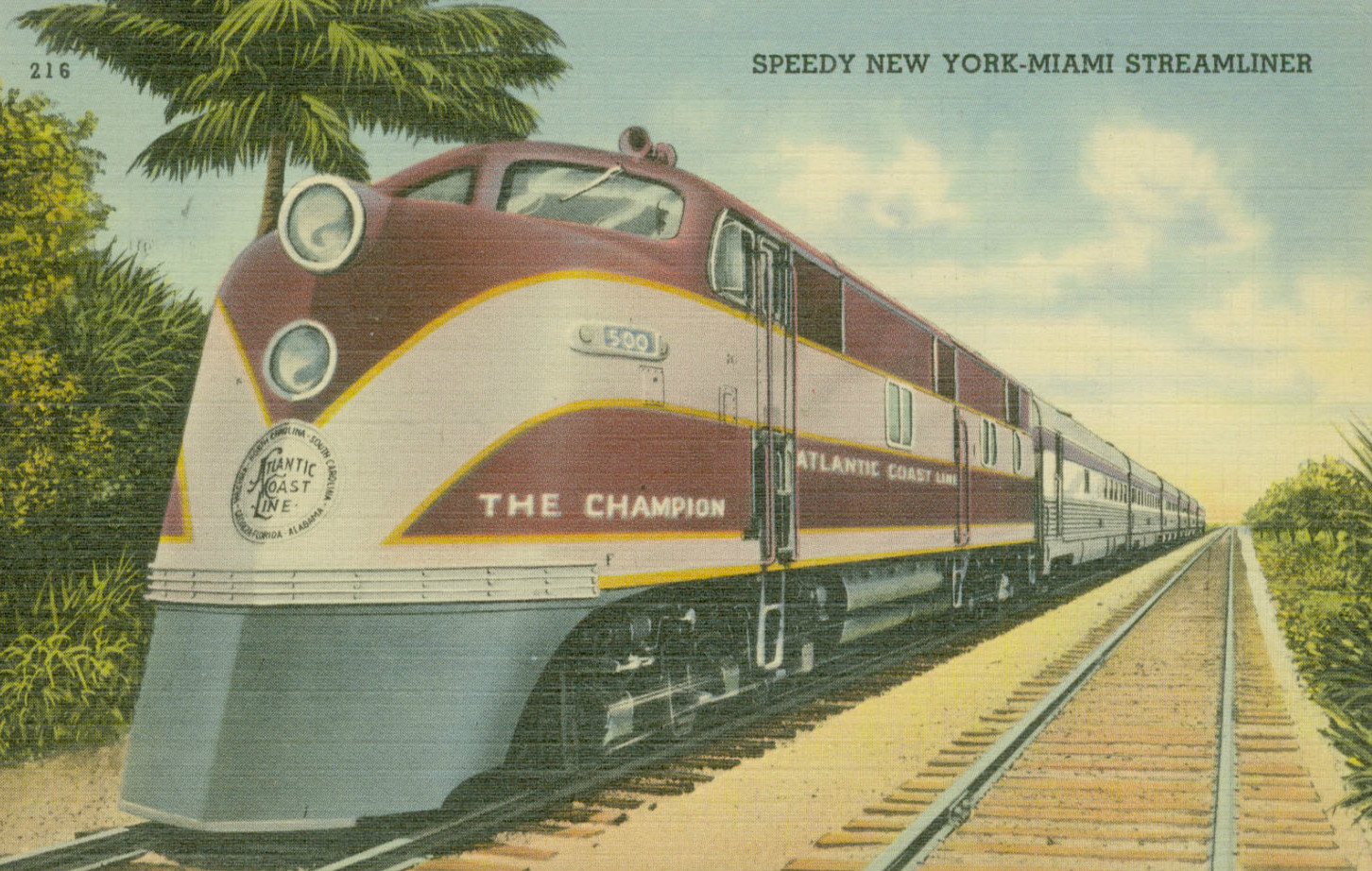
- A postcard depiction of the Champion.

Overview
- Service type: Inter-city rail
- Status: discontinued
- Locale: Northeastern United States/Southeastern United States
- First service: December 1, 1939
- Last service: October 1, 1979
- Successor: Silver Meteor
- Former operators: Atlantic Coast Line (1939–1967); Seaboard Coast Line (1967–1971); Amtrak (1971–1979)

Route
- Termini: New York City; West Coast section: St. Petersburg; East Coast section: Miami
- Distance travelled: 1,046 miles (1,683 km)
- Service frequency: Daily
- Train numbers: East Coast Champion: 1 (southbound), 2 (northbound); West Coast Champion: 91 (southbound), 92 (northbound); Amtrak: 85 (southbound), 86 (northbound)

On-board services
- Seating arrangements: Reserved coach
- Sleeping arrangements: Roomettes and double bedrooms
- Catering facilities: Dining cars
- Observation facilities: Tavern-lounge cars

The Champion was a streamlined passenger train operated by the Atlantic Coast Line Railroad and Florida East Coast Railway between New York City and Miami or St. Petersburg, Florida. It operated from 1939 until 1979, continuing under the Seaboard Coast Line and Amtrak. It was a direct competitor to the Seaboard Air Line Railway's Silver Meteor, the first New York-Florida streamliner.

== History ==
=== Atlantic Coast Line ===
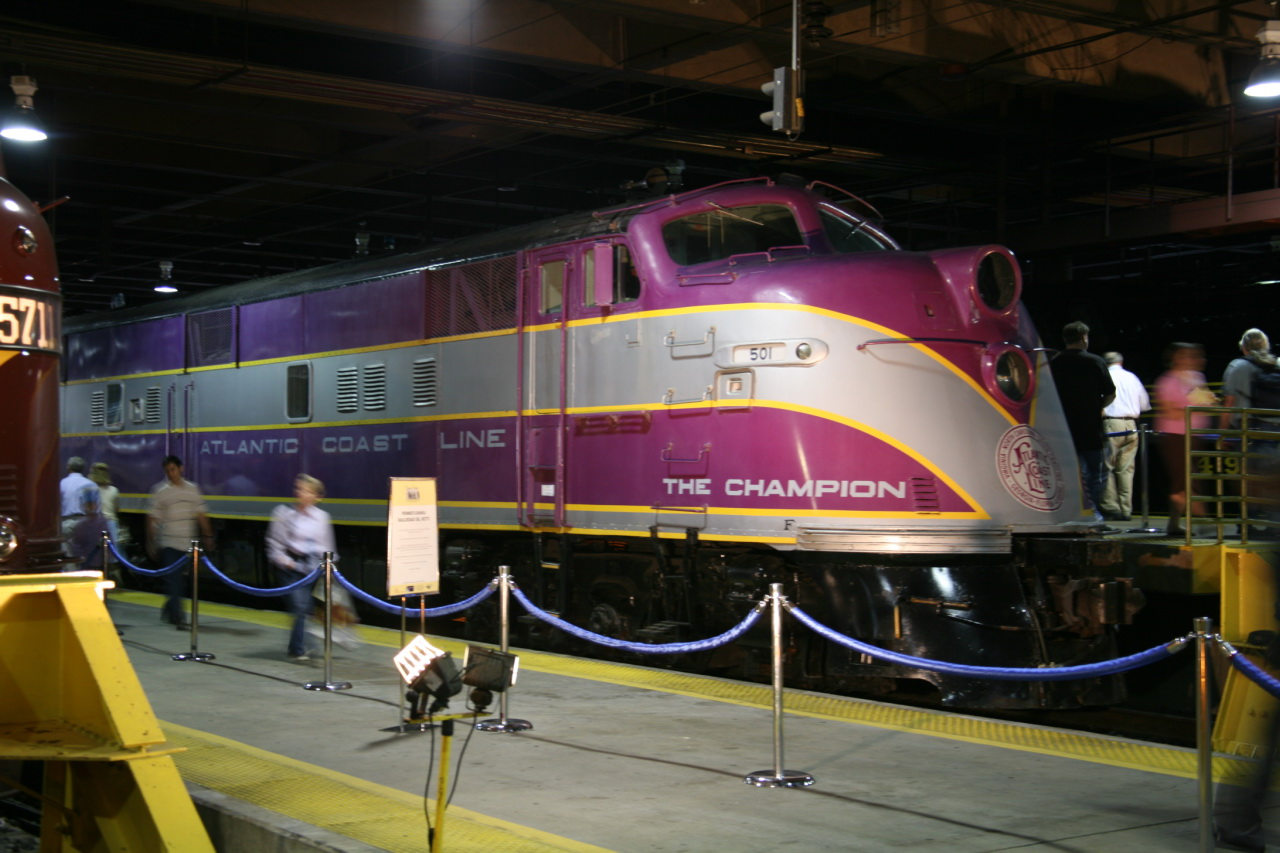
ACL No. 501, an EMC E3, at the North Carolina Transportation Museum.

The Champion started as a daily service of the Atlantic Coast Line Railroad (ACL) in 1939, competing with the Silver Meteor of the Seaboard Air Line (SAL) on the New York-Florida route. Initially just a New York-Miami service, the ACL added a section serving St. Petersburg and the Tampa Bay area in 1941 once enough streamlined equipment was available. The train was rebranded as the Tamiami Champion, with the St. Petersburg section called the Tamiami Champion (West Coast) (91 northbound/92 southbound), and the Miami section called the Tamiami Champion (East Coast) (1 northbound/2 southbound). In 1943 the names became East Coast Champion and West Coast Champion.

Southbound trains originated in New York's Pennsylvania Station, and traveled south over the Pennsylvania Railroad-owned Northeast Corridor through Philadelphia, Pennsylvania to Washington, D.C. There, a radio-equipped lounge car was added to the train. Leaving Washington, trains used the Richmond, Fredericksburg and Potomac Railroad to Richmond, Virginia, the north end of the ACL's main line. From Richmond, trains followed the Atlantic coast through Charleston, South Carolina and Savannah, Georgia to Jacksonville, Florida. Here the train split, with the West Coast section moving south then west through DeLand and Sanford on ACL rails to St. Petersburg, while the East Coast section turned south south-east to run along Florida's east coast to Miami via the Florida East Coast Railway.

Prior to the Civil Rights Movement, black passengers on the Champion and other trains running through the southern United States were restricted to the "colored" coach, a combination baggage/coach behind the diesel. African Americans ate behind a curtain at two designated tables next to the kitchen of the dining car, but were barred from the observation-tavern-lounge on the rear of the train. Racial segregation on trains serving the South persisted even though the Interstate Commerce Commission (ICC), U. S. courts, and President Harry S. Truman's 1948 mandate (banning segregation in railroad dining cars) had ordered interstate carriers to desegregrate.

By 1955 the West Coast Champion began hauling thru-cars for the City of Miami and South Wind streamliners to and from Chicago on its Jacksonville–Tampa/Sarasota leg via Orlando and its Jacksonville–St. Petersburg section via Gainesville, Ocala and Clearwater. During its long successful career the Champion network reached virtually every major city and resort in the Sunshine State except Florida Panhandle cities like Pensacola and Tallahassee, which were served by Seaboard's Jacksonville–New Orleans overnight Gulf Wind. By the early 1960s the West Coast Champion also had different sections north of Florida: in Wilson, North Carolina a section branched southeast to Wilmington, North Carolina and in Florence, South Carolina a branch left bound for Augusta, Georgia. However, these through services were only offered southbound. By 1966 these Augusta service was offered northbound also. In 1967 these sections to Wilmington and Augusta shifted over the East Coast Champion. The Gulf coast branch lines carried West Coast Champion thru-cars to three different Florida branches, one to St. Petersburg, a second to Tampa, Bradenton and Sarasota, and a third to Fort Myers and Naples. By April 1967 the Augusta branch was switched over to the Everglades and Palmetto trains.

The East Coast Champion ran up and down the Florida East Coast Railway stopping at popular east coast resorts. In 1963 the ACL rerouted the East Coast Champion from the coastal FEC tracks to an interior ACL route through Sanford and Auburndale, a town adjacent to Winter Haven, and then on SAL tracks from Auburndale to West Palm Beach and then to Miami.

At the outset, the Champion was an all-coach streamliner pulled by a diesel electric locomotive. Pullman sleeping cars were added by 1941. One Champion A-unit resides at the North Carolina Transportation Museum in Spencer, North Carolina.

=== Seaboard Coast Line ===
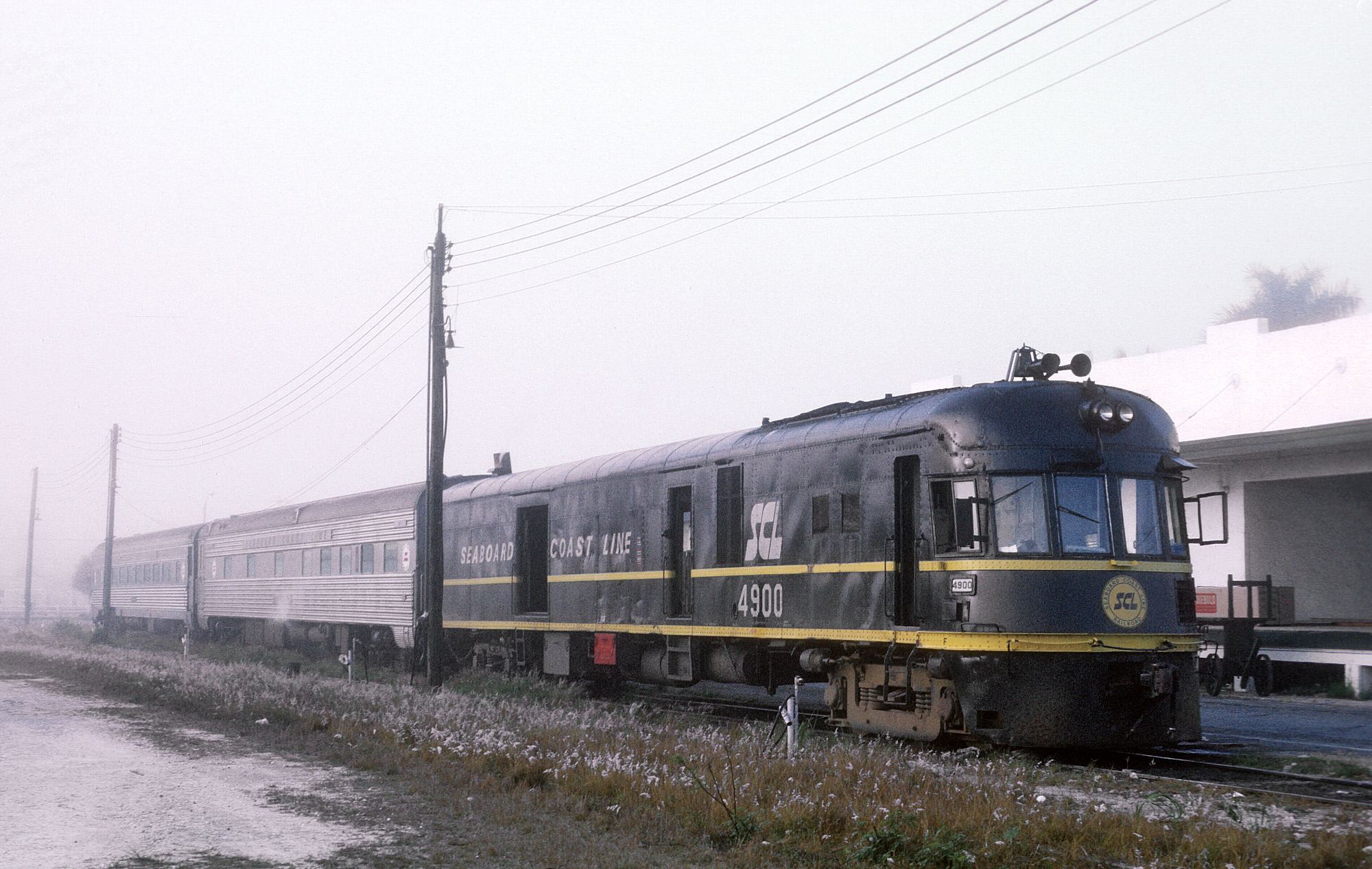
The Venice section of SCL's Champion in 1971; led by SCL 4900

In 1967, the Atlantic Coast Line merged with the Seaboard Air Line to form the Seaboard Coast Line, making the Champion a sister train to its longtime rivals, the Silver Meteor and Silver Star. Additionally, a few months after the merger, on September 4 northbound, and September 5 southbound, the East and West trains were consolidated into one. By December 1967, the name was simplified to the Champion, with the Miami and southeast Florida destinations eliminated, as the formerly SAL trains, the Silver Meteor and Silver Star had those responsibilities. Nonetheless, the Champion continued to have three different sections south of Jacksonville, simultaneously bound for different aforementioned Gulf Coast destinations from the ACL years. The Sarasota section was extended the next year to Venice. The Champion remained as a New York–St. Petersburg service, numbered #91 southbound and #92 northbound.

=== Amtrak ===
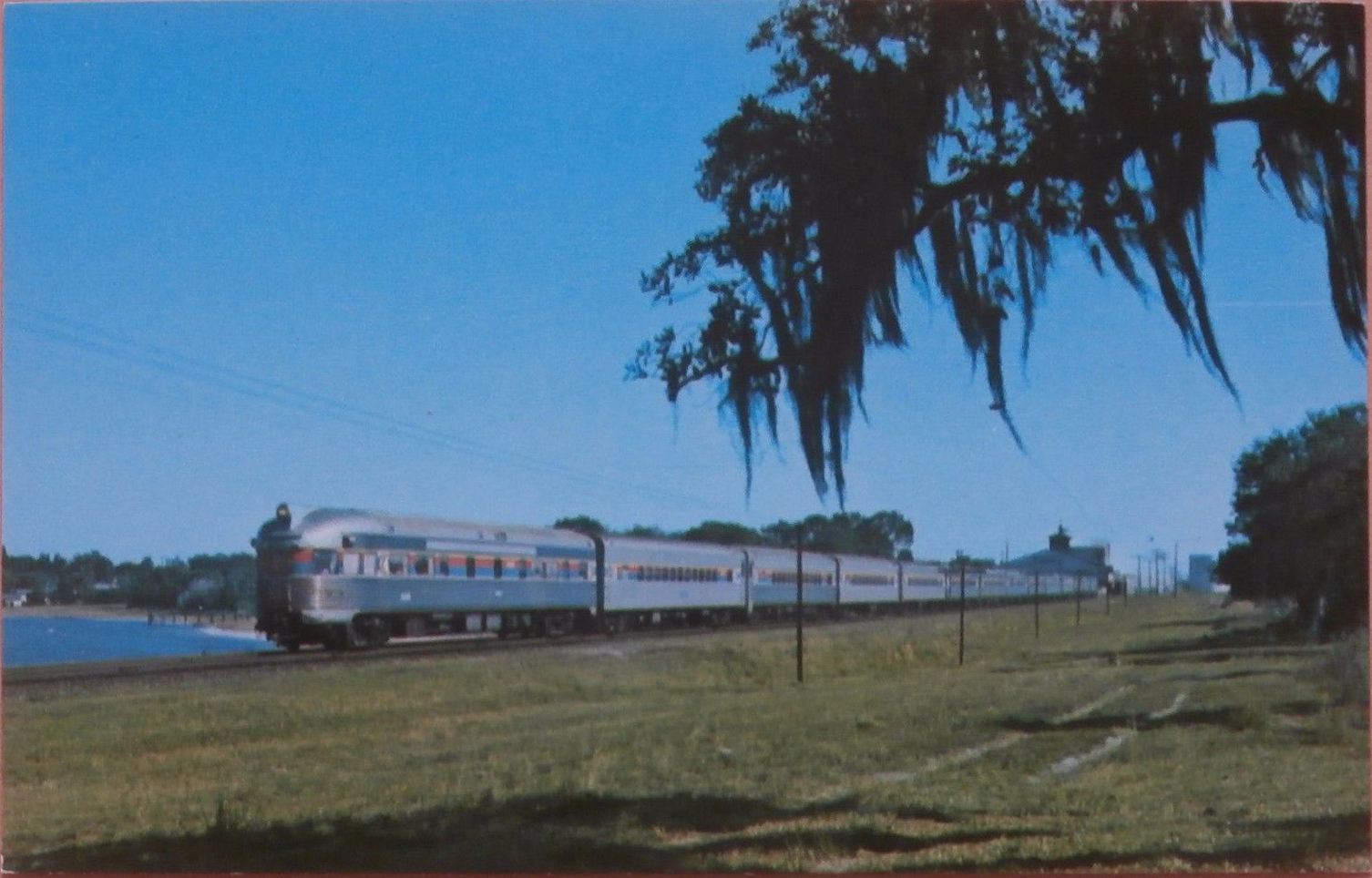
The northbound Champion at Lake Alfred, Florida, during the Amtrak era

When Amtrak assumed control of most of the passenger rail service in the United States in 1971, the Champion was retained as a New York–St. Petersburg service (#85/87) operating over the same line it had for the past thirty-two years. On several occasions throughout the 1970s Amtrak would combine the Champion with its old rival the Silver Meteor. The first of these instances came in the summer of 1972: the train split in Savannah, Georgia, with the Champion section continuing to St. Petersburg and the renamed Meteor section passing west of Jacksonville via Thalmann, Georgia, and Callahan, Florida, on former Seaboard tracks to Miami. These combinations occurred again in 1975, 1976, and 1977, but with two changes: the split occurred at Jacksonville, and the Meteor again became the Silver Meteor. In 1978, the United States Department of Transportation recommended the consolidation of New York - Florida services, leading to the permanent consolidation of the Champion into the Silver Meteor in October 1979, serving as the Silver Meteor's Tampa section. Although there were indications that the Champion name would be preserved, it was dropped altogether with the October 1, 1979, timetable. The Silver Meteor continued to operate the Tampa section until 1994, when it was discontinued. The western terminus of the Tampa section, however, was cut back to Tampa from St. Petersburg in February 1984.

== Equipment ==
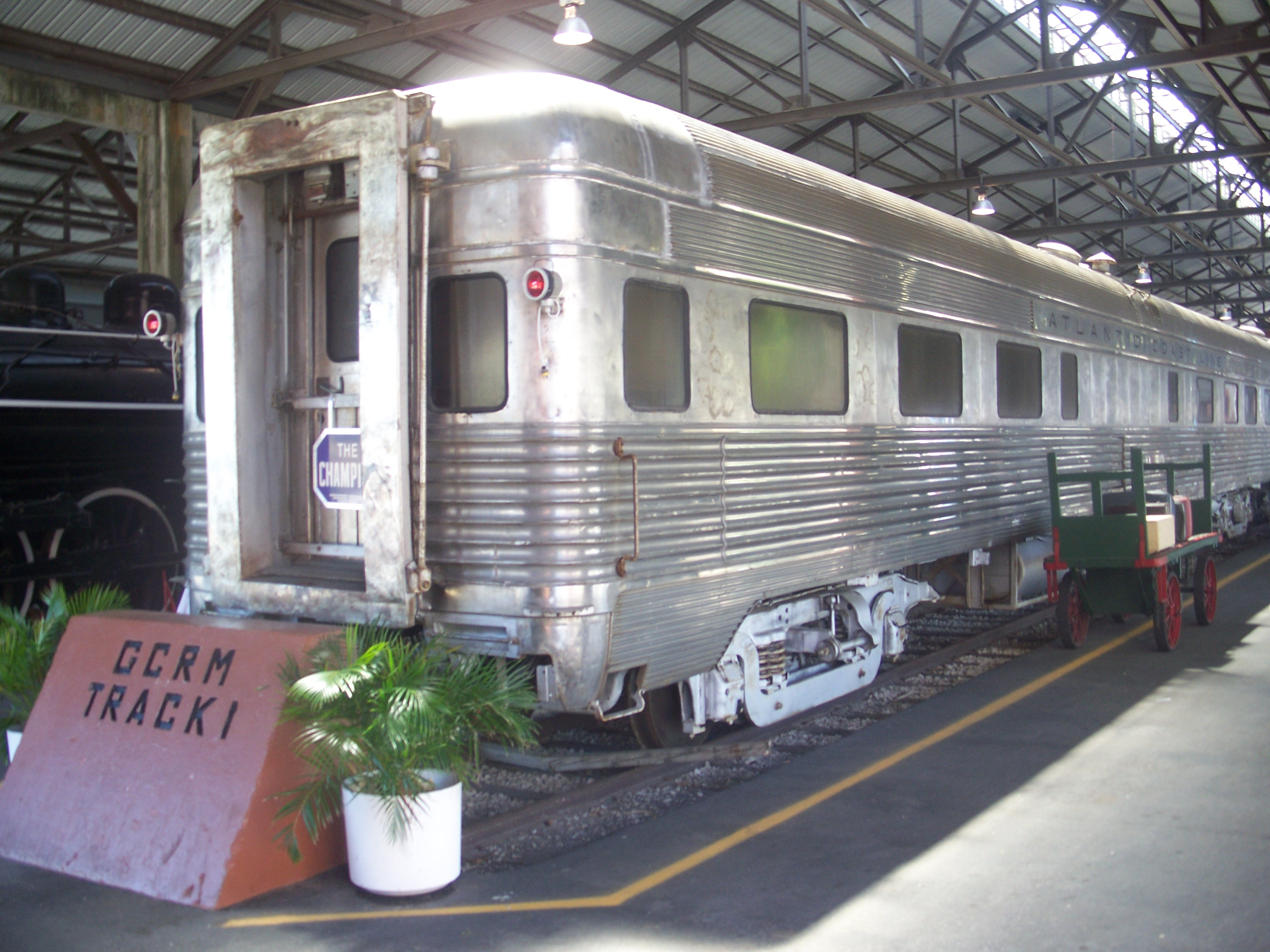
ACL No. 254, a tavern-lounge-observation car built for the Champion in 1940-41. Now at the Gold Coast Railroad Museum.

Sample consist
1939
- Train: Original FEC consist
- Baggage-dormitory-coach "New Smyrna" (14 seats); Coach "Boca Raton" (60 seats); Coach "Vero Beach" (52 seats); Dining car "Fort Pierce" (48 seats); Coach "Cocoa-Rockledge" (60 seats); Coach "Pompano" (60 seats); Tavern-lounge-observation "Bay Biscayne"

The Budd Company delivered three identical equipment sets for the Champion; the ACL owned two and the FEC the third (the FEC received an additional matching set which became the Henry M. Flagler). Each equipment set consisted of a baggage-dormitory-coach, four coaches, a dining car, and a tavern-lounge-observation car. In 1940–1941 Budd delivered additional equipment: three baggage-dorm-coaches, eight coaches, three dining cars, and three observation cars. The new equipment permitted the operation of an additional section between New York and St. Petersburg.

== Legacy ==
ACL, SAL and SCL had maintained exceptionally high standards on its popular Florida streamliners while other railroads gave up on passenger service. According to former ACL/SCL/Amtrak train attendant James Longmire (now retired in Jacksonville, Florida), "The Champ was always packed and we didn't stop serving dinner until everyone got fed... no matter how long it took. We called the Champ "Big Bertha" because tips were so good we didn't have to cash our paychecks."

== See also ==
- Silver Meteor
- Rennert railroad accident (in 1943)

== Bibliography ==
- Goolsby, Larry (1999). Atlantic Coast Line Passenger Service: The Postwar Years (1st ed.). TLC Publishing. ISBN 978-1-883089-45-0.
