= Chicago and Eastern Illinois Railroad =

Defunct American Class I railway

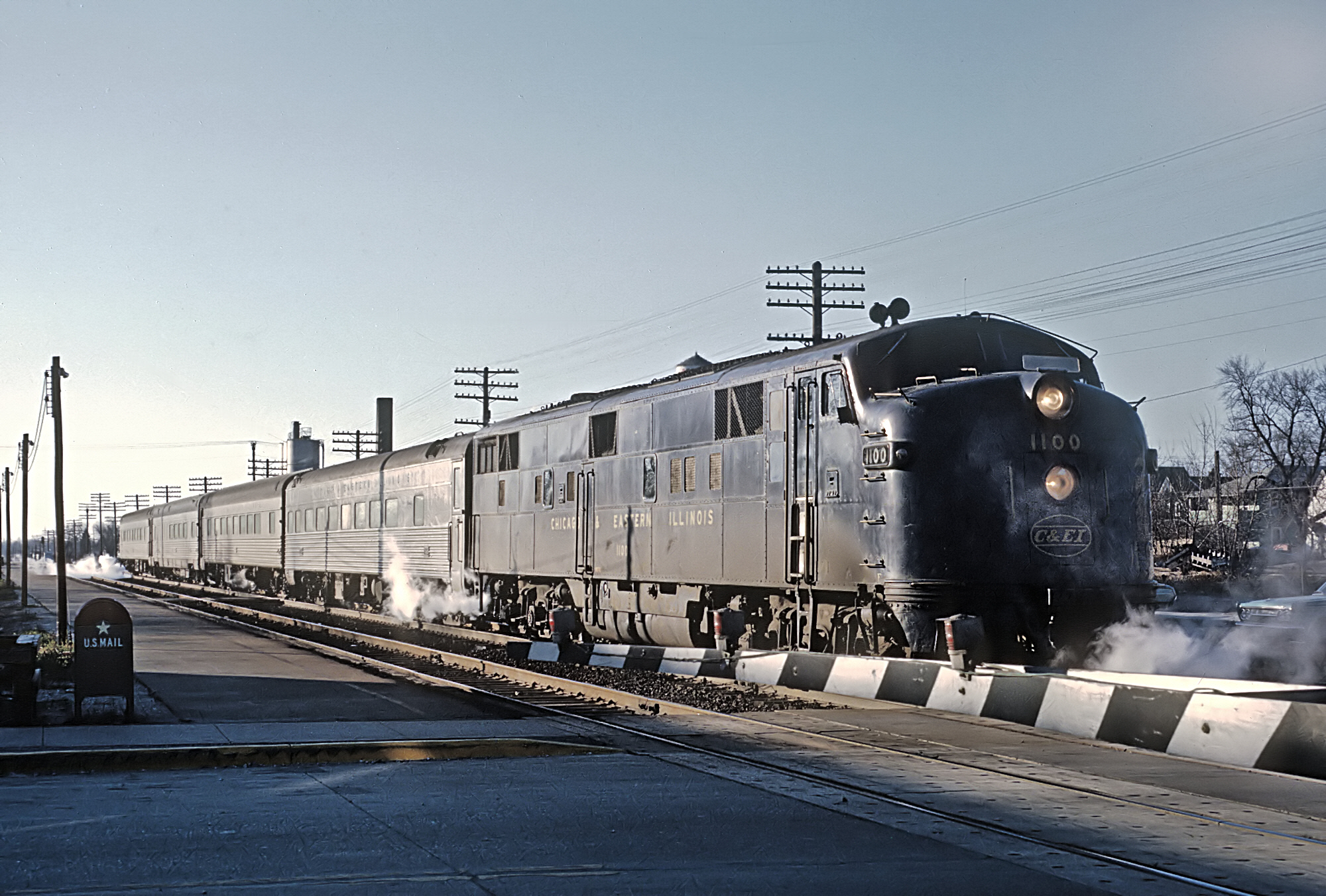
- The Danville - Chicago Flyer at Steger, Illinois on November 26, 1965

Overview
- Headquarters: Chicago
- Reporting mark: CEI
- Locale: Chicago, Illinois, St. Louis, Missouri, Evansville, Indiana and southern Illinois
- Dates of operation: 1877–1976
- Successor: Split between Missouri Pacific Railroad (later Union Pacific Railroad) and Louisville and Nashville Railroad (later CSX)

Technical
- Track gauge: 4 ft 8 1/2 in (1,435 mm) standard gauge

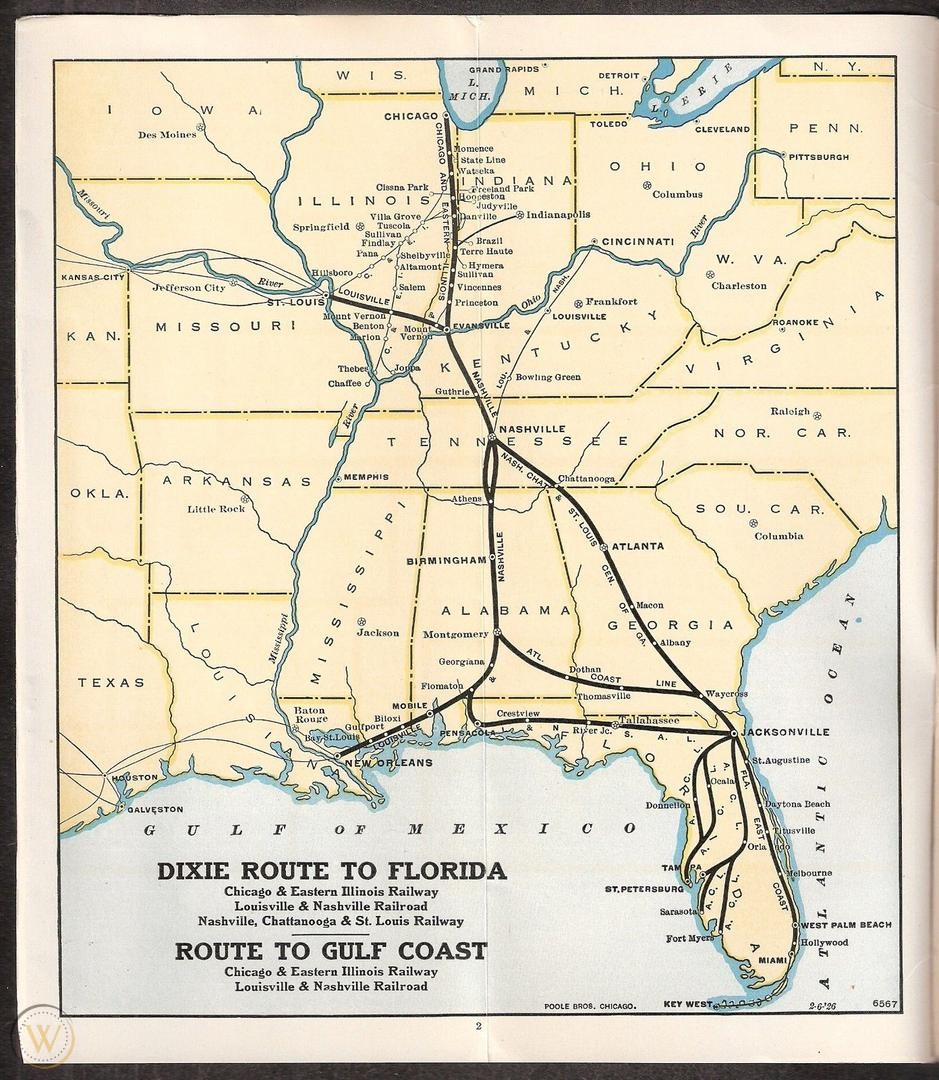
Map of the Dixie Route to Florida and connecting lines, published by the C&EI, L&N, and NC&StL railroads, 1926.

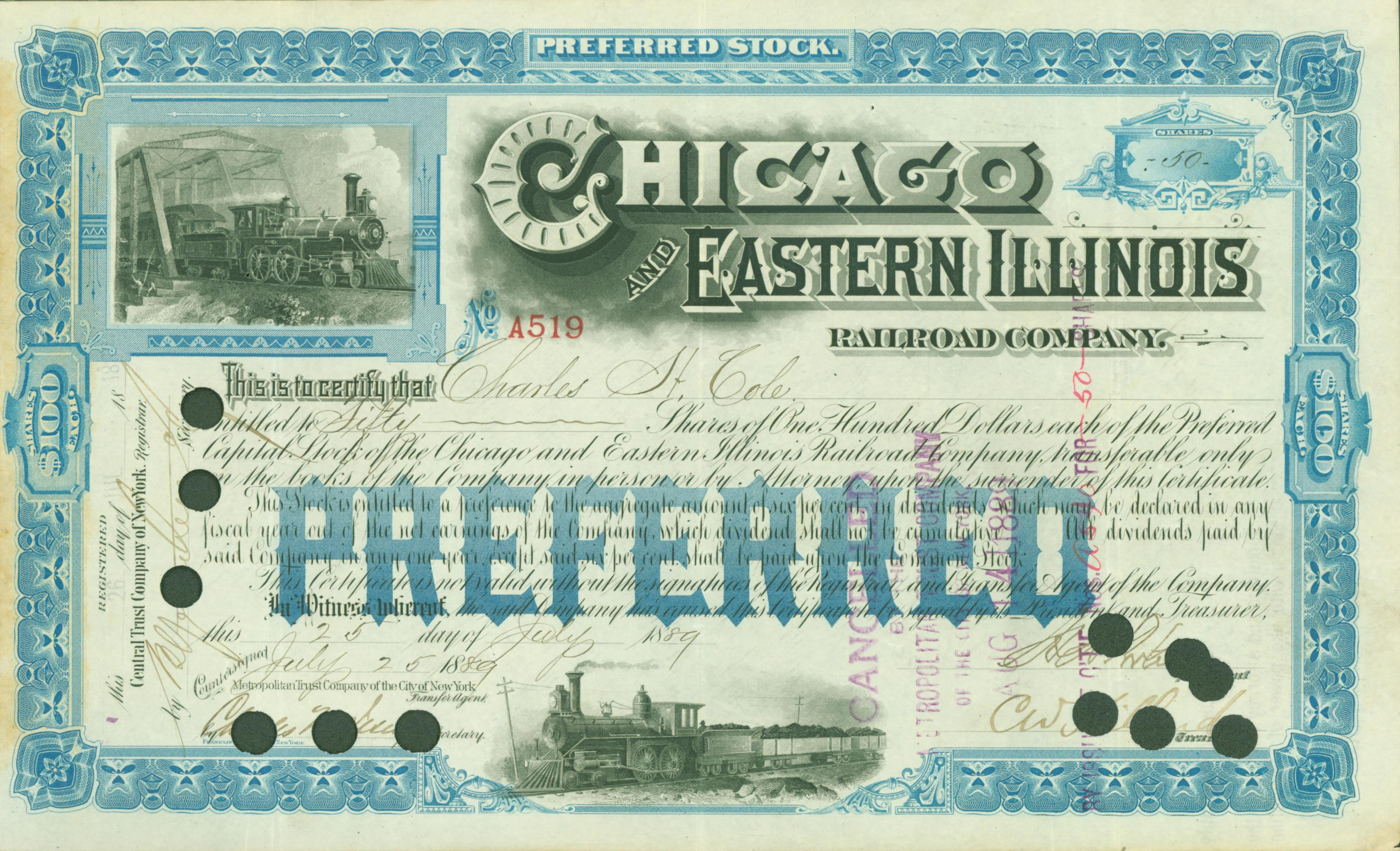
Preferred Share of the Chicago and Eastern Illinois Railroad Company, issued 25. July 1889

The Chicago and Eastern Illinois Railroad (reporting mark CEI) was a Class I railroad that linked Chicago to southern Illinois, St. Louis, and Evansville. Founded in 1877, it grew aggressively and stayed relatively strong throughout the Great Depression and two World Wars before finally being purchased by the Missouri Pacific Railroad (MP or MoPac) and the Louisville and Nashville Railroad (L&N). Missouri Pacific merged with the C&EI corporate entity in 1976, and was later acquired itself by the Union Pacific Railroad.

== History ==
The Chicago and Eastern Illinois Railroad was organized in 1877 as a consolidation of three others: the Chicago, Danville and Vincennes Railroad (Chicago-Danville, November 1871), the Evansville, Terre Haute and Chicago Railroad (Danville-Terre Haute, October 1871) and the Evansville and Terre Haute Railroad (Terre Haute-Evansville, November 1854). Intended to merge or purchase railroads that had built lines between the southern suburbs of Chicago and Terre Haute, Indiana through Danville, Illinois, the C&EI constructed a new line from Chicago to a Mississippi River connection in extreme southern Illinois at Thebes.

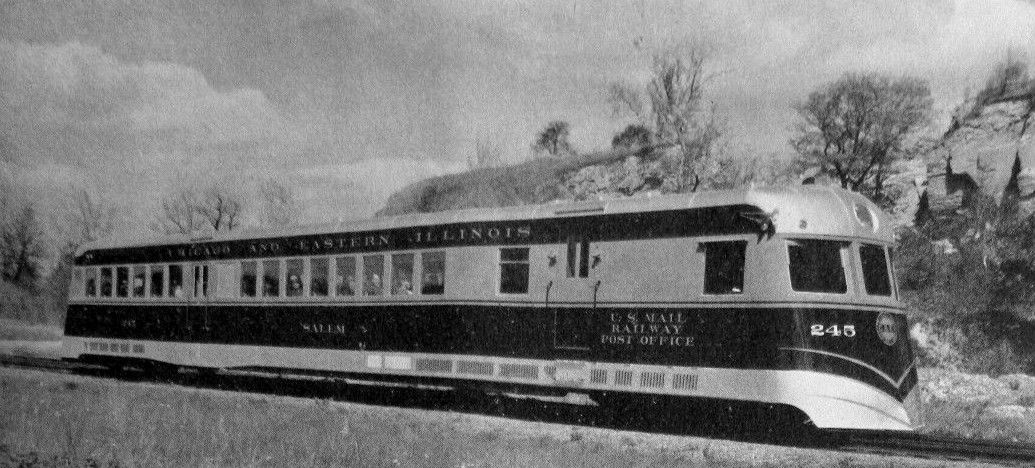
The Egyptian Zipper, 1937

The management of the Chicago and Eastern Illinois and the Chicago and Indiana Coal Railway ("the Coal Road" or C&IC) became intertwined and eventually a connection was built between the two railroads between Goodland, Indiana (on the C&IC) and Momence (on the C&EI). By 1894 the Eastern had merged the C&IC. The C&EI continued this vigorous growth into the next decade.

The city of Danville, Illinois, was the midpoint of the primary mainline between Chicago and Evansville. The first repair shops for locomotives and cars were built on the west side of the city in 1877 at the intersection of East Fairchild and Section Streets. When it became apparent that the original shops had become obsolete, it was decided to build new shops on the east side of town in the Oaklawn neighborhood. By that time the C&EI was considered a large regional railroad with 737 miles of mainline, 159 locomotives, 125 passenger cars, and 11,000 freight cars. Expansion of the railroad in the early 1900s led to the near doubling of the shop capacity just a few years later, at which point about 1,200 people were employed there.

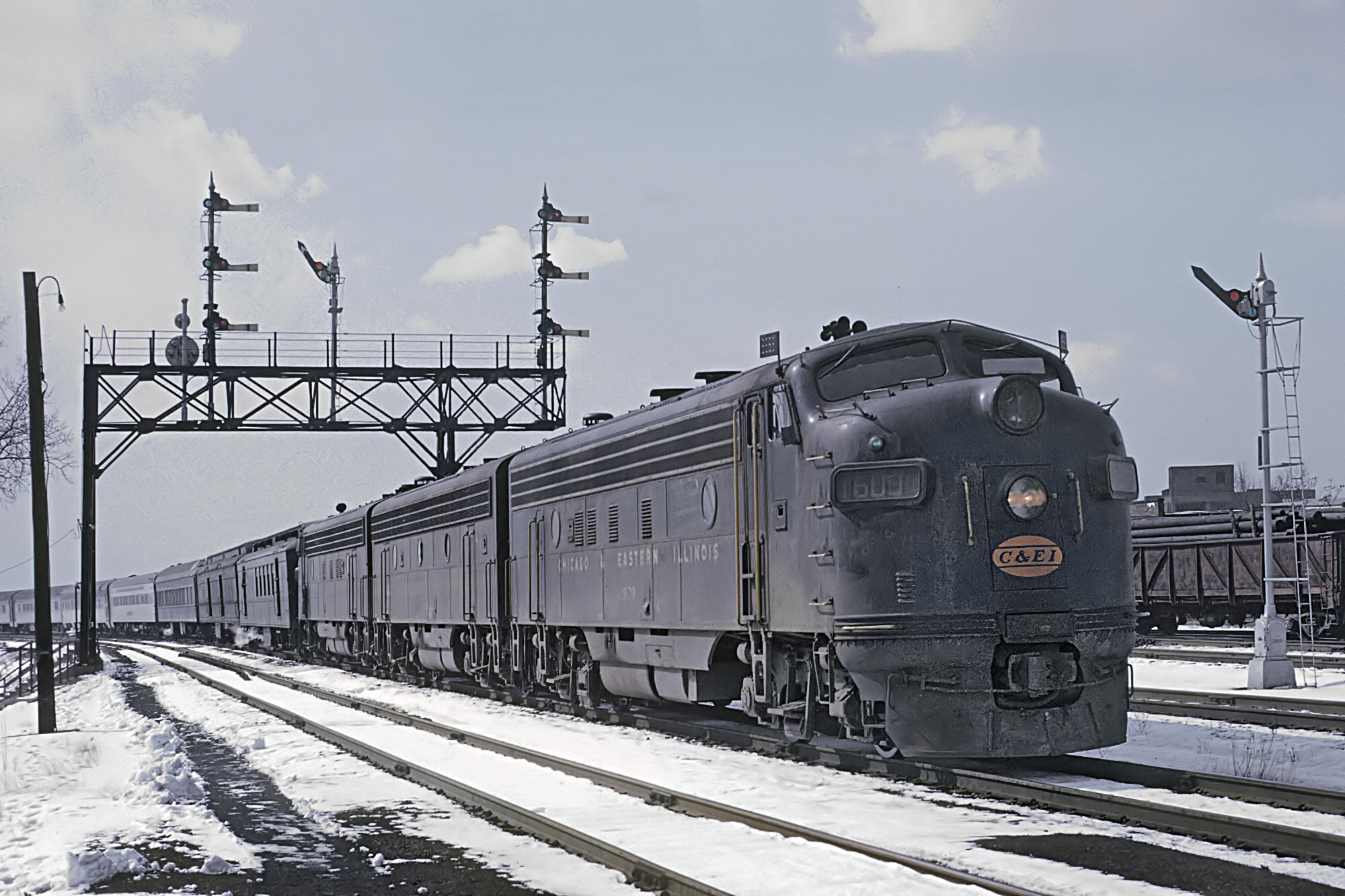
Chicago and Eastern Illinois train with the Hummingbird and the Georgian on March 31, 1964

In 1902, the Frisco purchased a controlling interest in the Chicago and Eastern Illinois and continued building; first a connection between the two railroads at Pana, Illinois, next extending the line in Indiana to Evansville and a connection with the Ohio River. However, in 1913 financial problems led to the collapse of the Frisco, and the Eastern was once again on its own by 1920. The C&EI spun off a variety of their lines, including the "Coal Road" (which became the Chicago, Attica and Southern Railroad). The C&EI did not survive the Great Depression intact, entering bankruptcy in 1933, re-emerging just before World War II in 1940. The railroad continued its brisk growth once again, gaining access to St. Louis, Missouri in 1954.

The Missouri Pacific Railroad began to quietly purchase C&EI stock in 1961. After approval was gained from the Interstate Commerce Commission, Mopac assumed control of the C&EI in May 1967. One of the stipulations of the merger required sale of C&EI's Evansville line to the Louisville and Nashville Railroad in 1969. The line directly south of Chicago to near Danville was actually purchased by both railroads (and continues to be owned and operated jointly by MoPac and L&N's successors, Union Pacific Railroad and CSX Transportation). The C&EI was maintained as a separate subsidiary for a few years, but Missouri Pacific merged it in 1976. The route from Woodland Junction, Illinois through Danville into Indiana became part of L&N and its successors (now CSX), while the western fork toward Thebes and St. Louis became MoPac/UP.

The Chicago terminal for the C&EI passenger trains was Dearborn Station, sometimes known as 'Polk Station.' LaSalle Street Station was used during Frisco control of the railroad.

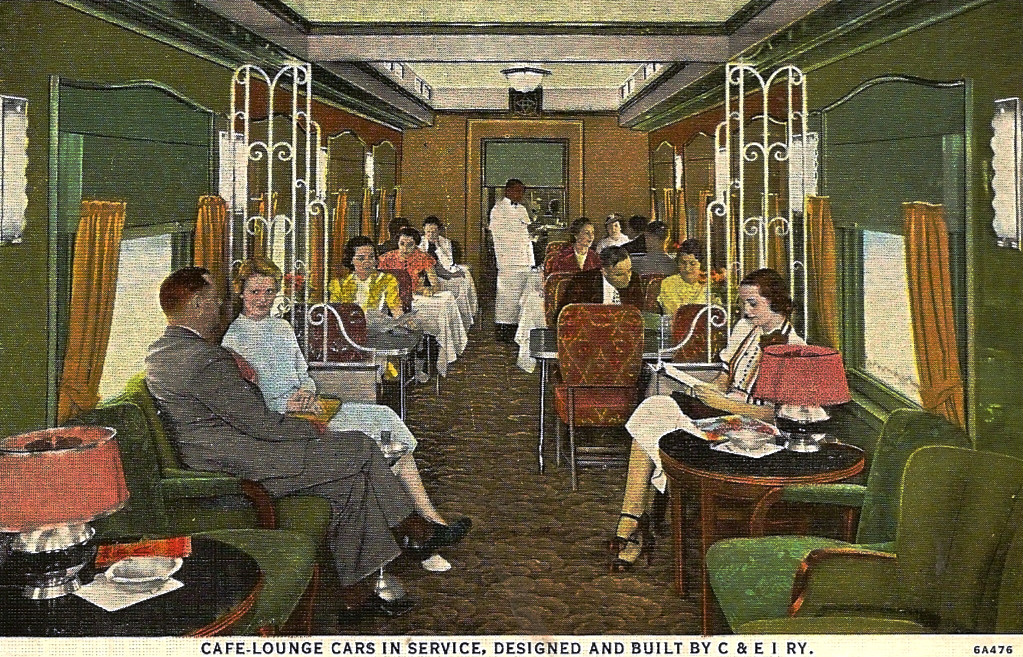
The railroad also built many of its own cars, such as this combination cafe-lounge car.

The C&EI operated many streamliners. Its own trains, the Chicago to Cypress Meadowlark, and the Chicago to Evansville Whippoorwill were short lived. The C&EI ran the Chicago to Evansville portion of the L&N's Humming Bird, and Georgian. The railroad also participated in the Chicago to Florida passenger service on the "Dixie Route", with trains such as the Dixie Limited, the Dixie Flyer, the Dixie Mail, the Dixie Flagler, and the Dixiana. It handled the trains from Chicago to Evansville, which then passed to the Louisville and Nashville, Nashville, Chattanooga and St. Louis, Central of Georgia, Atlantic Coast Line and Florida East Coast. In 1968 the C&EI terminated its Chicago to Evansville passenger operations, resulting in the loss of the Chicago leg of the remaining trains among those mentioned above, the Georgian and the Humming Bird. The Georgian was discontinued as a named train at this point. The C&EI's sole remaining train was the two and a half hour Chicago - Danville, Illinois Danville-Chicago Flyer.

Miles of road operated at year end: 945 in 1925, 863 in 1967, 643 in 1970 after L&N took over its piece. Track-miles operated: 1928 in 1925, 1435 in 1967, 1067 in 1970. In 1967 it reported 3173 million ton-miles of revenue freight and 41 million passenger-miles.
