= Louisville and Nashville Depot =

The Louisville and Nashville Depot, or Louisville and Nashville Railroad Depot or Louisville and Nashville Passenger Station, Louisville and Nashville Railroad Passenger Depot or variations, may refer to the following former and active train stations previously used by the Louisville and Nashville Railroad. Some of these are listed on the National Register of Historic Places (NRHP).

== Alabama ==
- Birmingham, Alabama (L&N station)
- Louisville and Nashville Railroad Depot (Cullman, Alabama)
- Louisville and Nashville Depot (Evergreen, Alabama)
- Louisville and Nashville Depot (Mobile, Alabama)
- Montgomery Union Station

== Florida ==
- Louisville and Nashville Depot (Chipley, Florida) (a.k.a.; "Bill Lee Station")
- Louisville and Nashville Depot (DeFuniak Springs, Florida), currently part of the Walton County Heritage Museum
- Louisville and Nashville Depot (Milton, Florida), currently the West Florida Railroad Museum
- Louisville and Nashville Station (Pensacola, Florida)

== Georgia ==
- Louisville and Nashville Depot (Dalton, Georgia)
- Louisville and Nashville Depot (Marietta, Georgia)

== Illinois ==
- Louisville and Nashville Depot (Nashville, Illinois)

== Indiana ==
- Louisville and Nashville Railroad Station (Evansville, Indiana)

== Kentucky ==
- Louisville and Nashville Railroad Passenger Depot (Berea, Kentucky), listed on the NRHP in Madison County, Kentucky
- Louisville and Nashville Railroad Station (Bowling Green, Kentucky)
- Louisville and Nashville Passenger Depot (Carlisle, Kentucky), listed on the NRHP in Kentucky
- Louisville and Nashville Railroad Depot (Harlan, Kentucky), formerly listed on the NRHP in Harlan County, Kentucky
- Louisville and Nashville Railroad Depot (Henderson, Kentucky), listed on the NRHP in Kentucky
- Hopkinsville L & N Railroad Depot (Hopkinsville, Kentucky)
- Stanford L&N Railroad Depot, Stanford, Kentucky

== Mississippi ==
- Bay St. Louis station, Bay St. Louis, Mississippi, in a building designated a Mississippi landmark
- Pascagoula (Amtrak station), Pascagoula, Mississippi, which includes the Louisville and Nashville Railroad Depot
- Louisville and Nashville Railroad Depot at Ocean Springs, Ocean Springs, Mississippi, listed on the NRHP in Jackson County, Mississippi

== Tennessee ==
- Chattanooga Union Station
- L & N Train Station (Clarksville, Tennessee)
- Louisville and Nashville Freight Depot (Knoxville, Tennessee), listed on the NRHP in Knox County, Tennessee
- L&N Station (Knoxville), NRHP-listed as "Louisville and Nashville Passenger Station"
- Memphis Union Station
- Nashville Union Station

== See also ==
- Louisville and Nashville Railroad Office Building, Louisville, Kentucky
- Mitchellsburg Louisville and Nashville Railroad Culvert, Mitchellsburg, Kentucky, listed on the NRHP in Boyle County, Kentucky
- Louisville and Nashville Combine Car Number 665, New Haven, Kentucky
