= Nashville station =

Nashville station may refer to:

- Nashville station (Pennsylvania), a former Western Maryland station in Nashville, Pennsylvania
- Union Station (Nashville), a former Amtrak station in Nashville, Tennessee
- Music City Star stations in Nashville, Tennessee
- Nashville station (Illinois), a former train station in Nashville, Illinois

== See also ==
- Louisville and Nashville Depot (disambiguation)
