= Pensacola station =

Pensacola station may refer to:

- Pensacola station (Amtrak), former train station in Pensacola, Florida serving Amtrak
- Louisville and Nashville Passenger Station and Express Building, former train station in Pensacola, Florida

== See also ==
- Pensacola (disambiguation)
- Naval Air Station Pensacola
