= Birmingham Xpress =

Bus rapid transit service in Birmingham, Alabama, United States

Birmingham Xpress (BX)
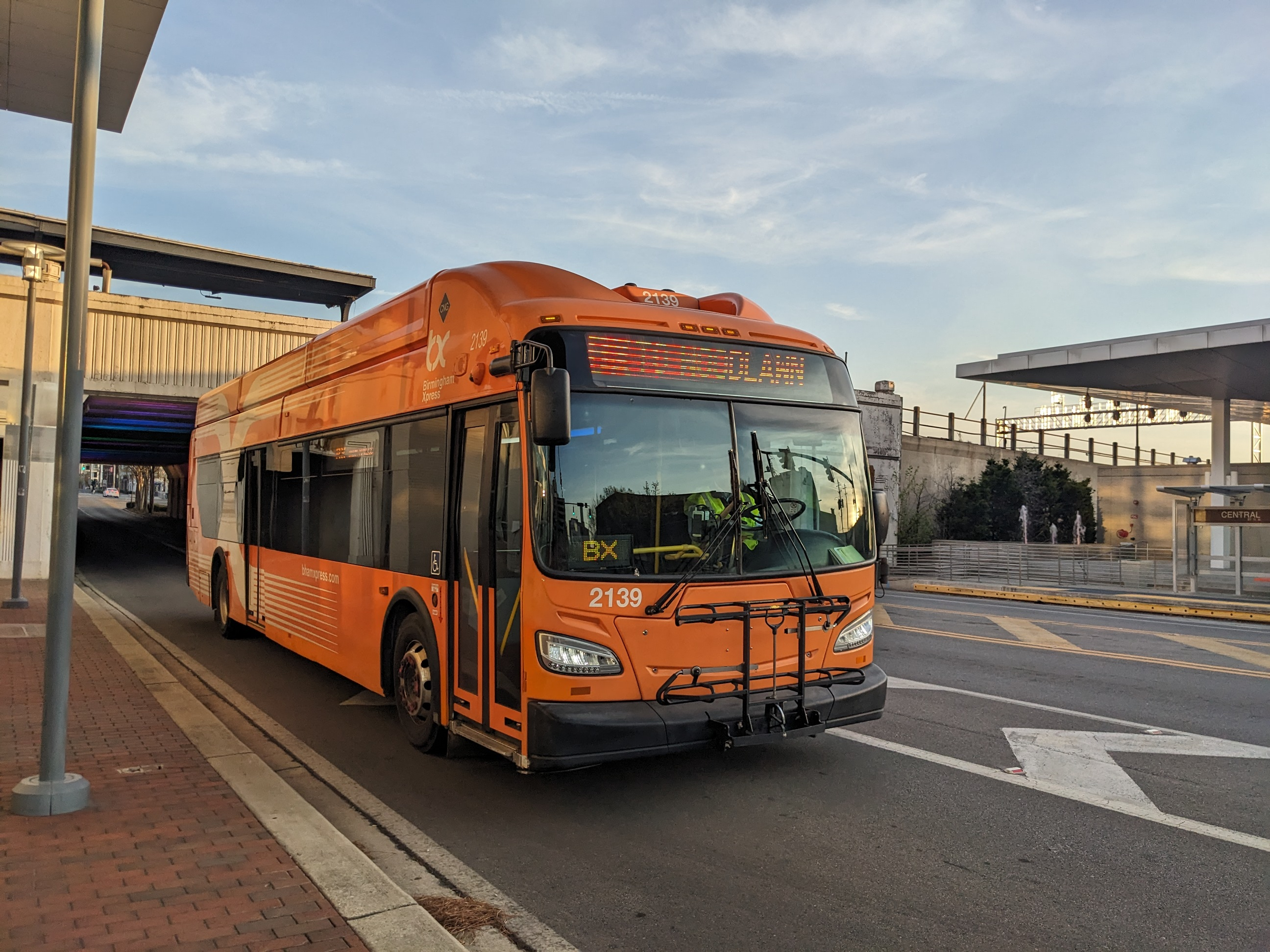
- A Birmingham Xpress bus on 18th Street

Overview
- System: BJCTA
- Vehicle: New Flyer XN40
- Began service: September 22, 2022

Route
- Locale: Birmingham, Alabama
- Start: Woodlawn Transit Center
- End: Crossplex Transit Center
- Length: 10 mi (16 km)
- Stations: 18

Service
- Frequency: Peak: 15 minutes Off-peak: 30 minutes
- Weekend frequency: 30 minutes
- Ridership: 389,911 (2024)

Birmingham Xpress (BX) is a bus rapid transit service in Birmingham, Alabama, United States. It is operated by BJCTA and serves a 10 miles (16 km) corridor between the Woodlawn neighborhood and Birmingham Crossplex. Construction began in December 2020, with full service beginning in the fall of 2022. The system uses 40-foot (12 m) buses powered by compressed natural gas on a route featuring dedicated lanes and transit signal priority.

== History ==
In 2015, a $20 million TIGER grant was awarded to Birmingham by the Federal Transit Administration. A combination of federal and local funding for the $64 million project allowed construction to commence in late 2020 and Xpress service began on September 22, 2022. After opening, the service operated fare-free until the end of 2022.

== Operations ==
=== Stations ===
The route runs northeast–southwest through Birmingham. The eighteen stations include covered platforms, with level boarding, a ticketing kiosk, arrival signage, and bike racks.

List of stations
Stops	Notable places nearby and notes
Woodlawn Transit Center	Woodlawn
West Woodlawn	
North Avondale	
Avondale	Avondale
Sloss Furnace	Sloss Furnace
Central Station	Birmingham station, McWane Science Center
Railroad Park	Railroad Park
Medical Center	UAB, UAB Hospital
Children's Hospital	Children's of Alabama, Regions Field
UAB Parkside	UAB
Memorial Park	Memorial Park Recreation Center
Titusville	
Elmwood	
North Titusville	Elmwood Cemetery
West End	West End Walking Trail
Princeton	Princeton Baptist Medical Center
Rickwood-Rising	Rickwood Field
Crossplex Transit Center	Birmingham CrossPlex, Bill Harris Arena

=== Headways ===
Time	5A	6A	7A	8A	9A	10A	11A	12P	1P	2P	3P	4P	5P	6P	7P	8P	9P	10P	11:30P
Weekdays	30	15				30					15				30				
Saturday	120	—N/a	30																—N/a
Sunday	—N/a																		

=== Buses ===
The Birmingham Xpress system uses New Flyer XN40 buses powered by compressed natural gas. They feature on-board bicycle racks, free Wi-Fi, and accessibility features including level boarding and self-securing wheelchair parking.
