= Atmore station =

Former train station in Atmore, Alabama

Atmore, AL
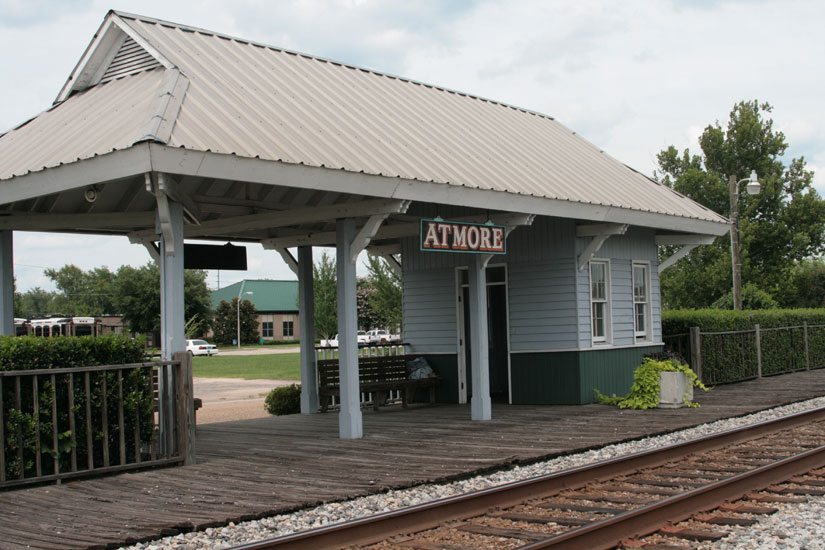

General information
- Location: 107 East Louisville Street; Atmore, Alabama
- Coordinates: 31°1′27″N 87°29′14″W

Construction
- Accessible: yes

Other information
- Status: Closed
- Station code: ATR

History
- Opened: October 29, 1989
- Closed: August 28, 2005 (service suspended)

Former services
Preceding station	Amtrak	Following station
Mobile toward Los Angeles	Sunset Limited (1993–2005)	Pensacola toward Orlando or Miami
Mobile Terminus	Gulf Breeze	Brewton toward Birmingham
Location

Atmore station is a former train station in Atmore, Alabama. It formerly served Amtrak's Sunset Limited line. It has been closed since 2005, after Amtrak stopped service of the Sunset Limited east of New Orleans due to the effects of Hurricane Katrina. The station is located at 107 East Louisville Street. It features an enclosed waiting area, payphones, and partial wheelchair accessibility. Its Amtrak station code is ATR.

The station was a stop on the Gulf Breeze until its discontinuance on April 2, 1995.

Previously, Atmore had a Frisco Railway station, serving trains north to Tupelo, Mississippi and Memphis, Tennessee, and south to Pensacola, Florida. A Louisville and Nashville station served trains due north to Montgomery, Louisville and Cincinnati, and south to New Orleans. The Frisco service ended in 1955, and the L&N in 1971.
