= Louisville station =

Louisville station may refer to two former railroad stations in Louisville, Kentucky:

- Central Station (Louisville) or 7th Street Depot, demolished 1972
- Union Station (Louisville), open 1889–1979, now TARC offices

== See also ==
- Louisville and Nashville Depot (disambiguation)
- Naval Ordnance Station Louisville
