= Thomasville station (Georgia) =

Railway station in Georgia, United States

Thomasville, GA
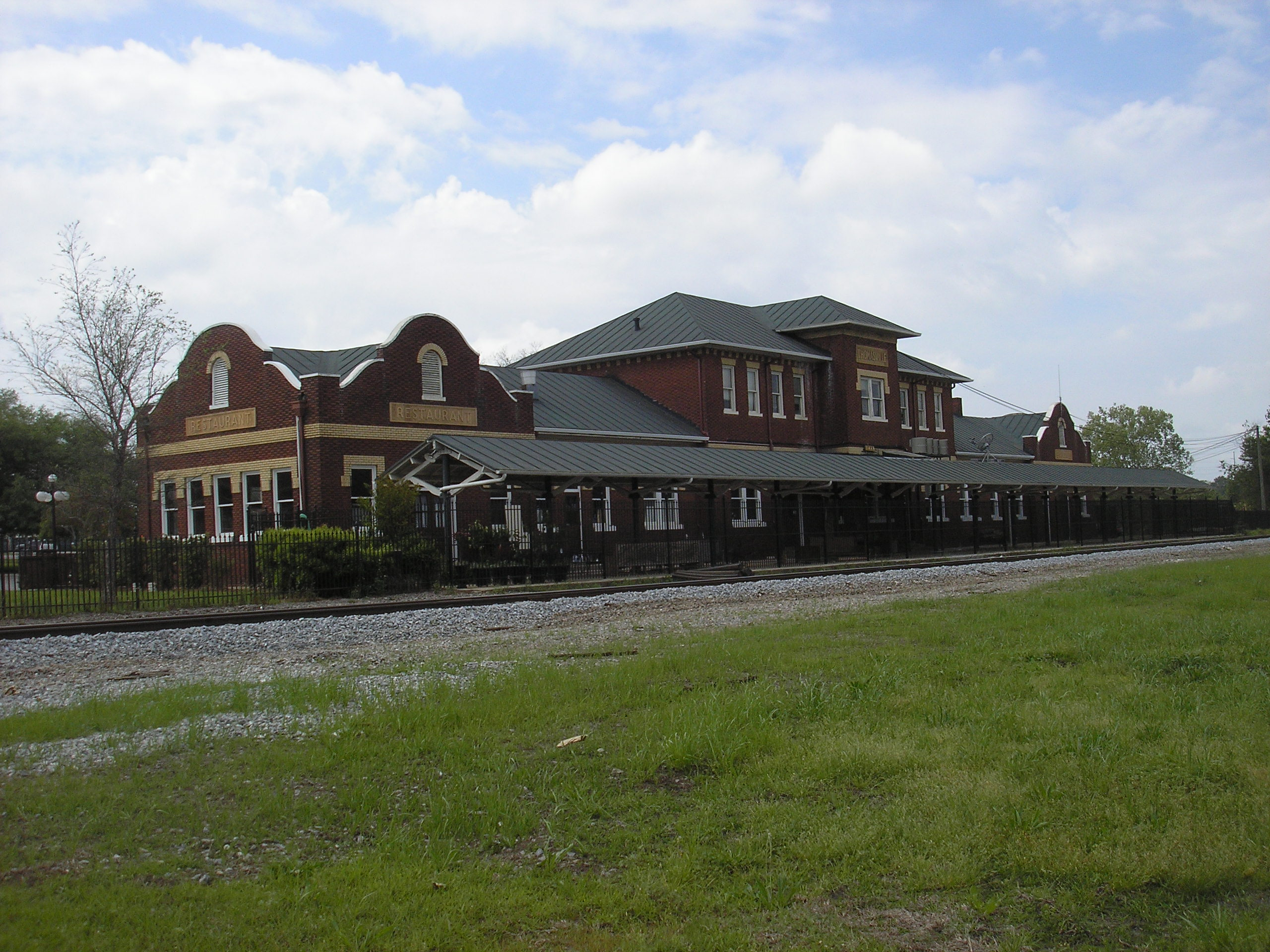
- The former station at Thomasville in April 2015.

General information
- Location: 420 West Jackson Street (US 319), Thomasville, Georgia
- Line: Seaboard Coast Line

History
- Closed: 1979
- Rebuilt: 1914

Former services
Preceding station	Amtrak	Following station
Valdosta toward St. Petersburg or Miami	Floridian	Dothan toward Chicago
Preceding station	Atlantic Coast Line Railroad	Following station
Pine Park toward Montgomery	Montgomery – Waycross	Boston toward Waycross
Pasco toward Albany	Albany – Dunnellon	Metcalf toward Dunnellon
- Thomasville Depot
- U.S. National Register of Historic Places
- Location within Georgia Location within the United States
- Location: 420 W. Jackson St./US 319, Thomasville, Georgia
- Coordinates: 30°50′1″N 83°59′3″W
- Area: less than one acre
- Built: 1914
- Built by: Little, W.H. & Philips, W.C.
- Architect: Atlantic Coast Line Railroad
- Architectural style: Mission/Spanish Revival
- NRHP reference No.: 88000609
- Added to NRHP: May 19, 1988
Location

The Thomasville Depot in Thomasville, Georgia was built in 1914. It was listed on the National Register of Historic Places in 1988.

The station served the Atlantic Coast Line Railroad. In later years it served the ACL's successor, the Seaboard Coast Line, and also Amtrak. Trains included the South Wind (Illinois Central Chicago–Miami train, running over ACL, later, SCL lines) and Amtrak's Floridian (also Chicago–Miami). The station also served a side branch of the ACL's (later, SCL) Champion originating in Montgomery, Alabama and heading northeast to New York City. Passenger service ended with the demise of the Floridian in 1979.

The depot building has two stories and some Mission/Spanish Revival styling. The listing included the depot building, a train platform shed, and a Railway Express Agency (REA) building.

The three buildings are also contributing buildings in the Thomasville Commercial Historic District.
