= Pensacola (disambiguation) =

Pensacola is a city in the western part of the U.S. state of Florida.

Pensacola may also refer to:

== Anthropology ==
- Pensacola people, a Native American people historically of western Florida
- Pensacola culture, an archaeological culture of the Mississippian period along the Gulf coast of the United States

== Entertainment ==
- Pensacola: Wings of Gold, a television series
- "Pensacola", a 1995 song by Joan Osborne from Relish
- "Pensacola", a 1998 song by Soul Coughing from El Oso
- "Pensacola", a 2011 song by Manchester Orchestra from Simple Math
- "Pensacola", a 2013 song by Deerhunter from "Monomania"

== Military ==
- Naval Air Station Pensacola, a major U.S. Navy base
- USS Pensacola (CA-24), a U.S. Navy heavy cruiser, the lead ship of her class of heavy cruiser
- Pensacola class cruiser, a class of U.S. Navy cruisers

== Places ==
- Pensacola Bay, a bay in Florida
- Pensacola Beach, Florida, an unincorporated community and beach
- Historic Pensacola Village, an area of Pensacola, Florida
- Pensacola, Oklahoma
- Pensacola, North Carolina

== Other uses ==
- Pensacola (spider), a genus of jumping spiders
- Pensacola station (disambiguation), stations of the name
- Peniscola, Spain
