= Thomasville Commercial Historic District =

Historic district in Georgia, United States

- U.S. National Register of Historic Places
- U.S. Historic district
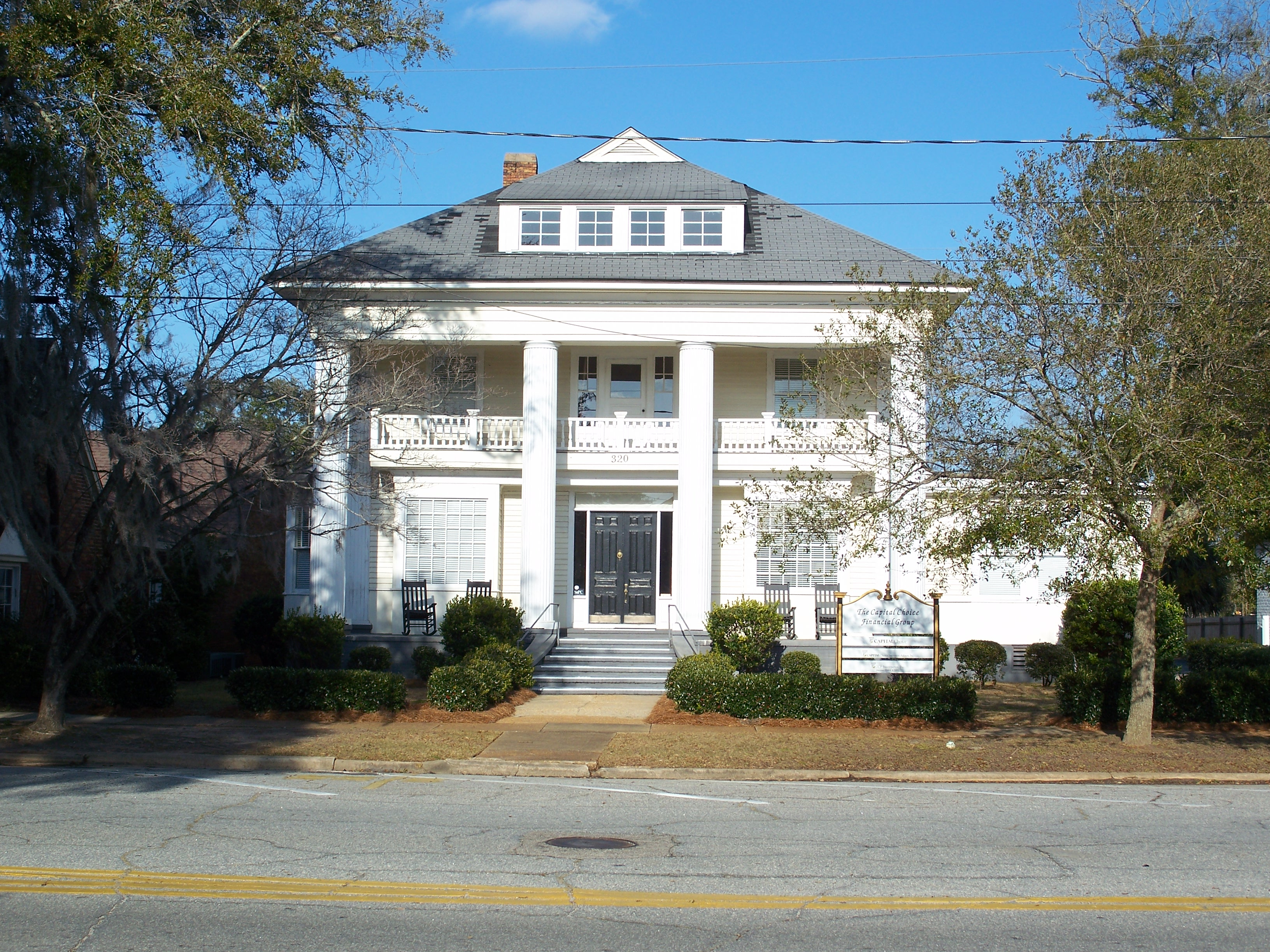

- Location within Georgia Location within the United States
- Interactive map showing the location of Thomasville Commercial Historic District
- Location: Roughly N. Stevens, N. Madison, N. Broad, Remington, Jackson, and Jefferson Sts. (original), Downtown Thomasville bet. Jefferson St. and Smith Ave. and bet. Crawford And Siexas St., Thomasville, Georgia
- Coordinates: 30°50′23″N 83°58′55″W
- Area: 80 acres (32 ha)
- Architect: Bowen Bros.
- Architectural style: Late 19th and 20th Century Revivals, Late Victorian
- NRHP reference No.: 84001258 (original); 04001185 (increase)

Significant dates
- Added to NRHP: September 7, 1984
- Boundary increase: October 28, 2004

Thomasville Commercial Historic District is a historic district that was listed on the National Register of Historic Places in 1984 and was both increased and decreased in 2004. The modified district, about 60 acres (24 ha) in size, then included 123 contributing buildings, three contributing structures, and a contributing object, as well as 65 non-contributing buildings.

The district consists primarily of one- and two-story commercial buildings built between 1880 and the 1940s.

It has a number of buildings dating back to the 1880s. For the historic district the Thomasville Main Street Program helped raise over $44 million for the district.

The district includes:

- Thomas County Courthouse, 225 North Broad Street, separately NRHP-listed
- Thomasville Depot, separately NRHP-listed (three contributing buildings; within the 2004 increase)
- B'nai Israel Synagogue, separately NRHP-listed (within the 2004 increase)
- Hollybrook Building - Brokerage Exchange built in 1882
- Lapham-Patterson House
- Thomasville Cultural Center
