= Evergreen station (Alabama) =

Evergreen, AL
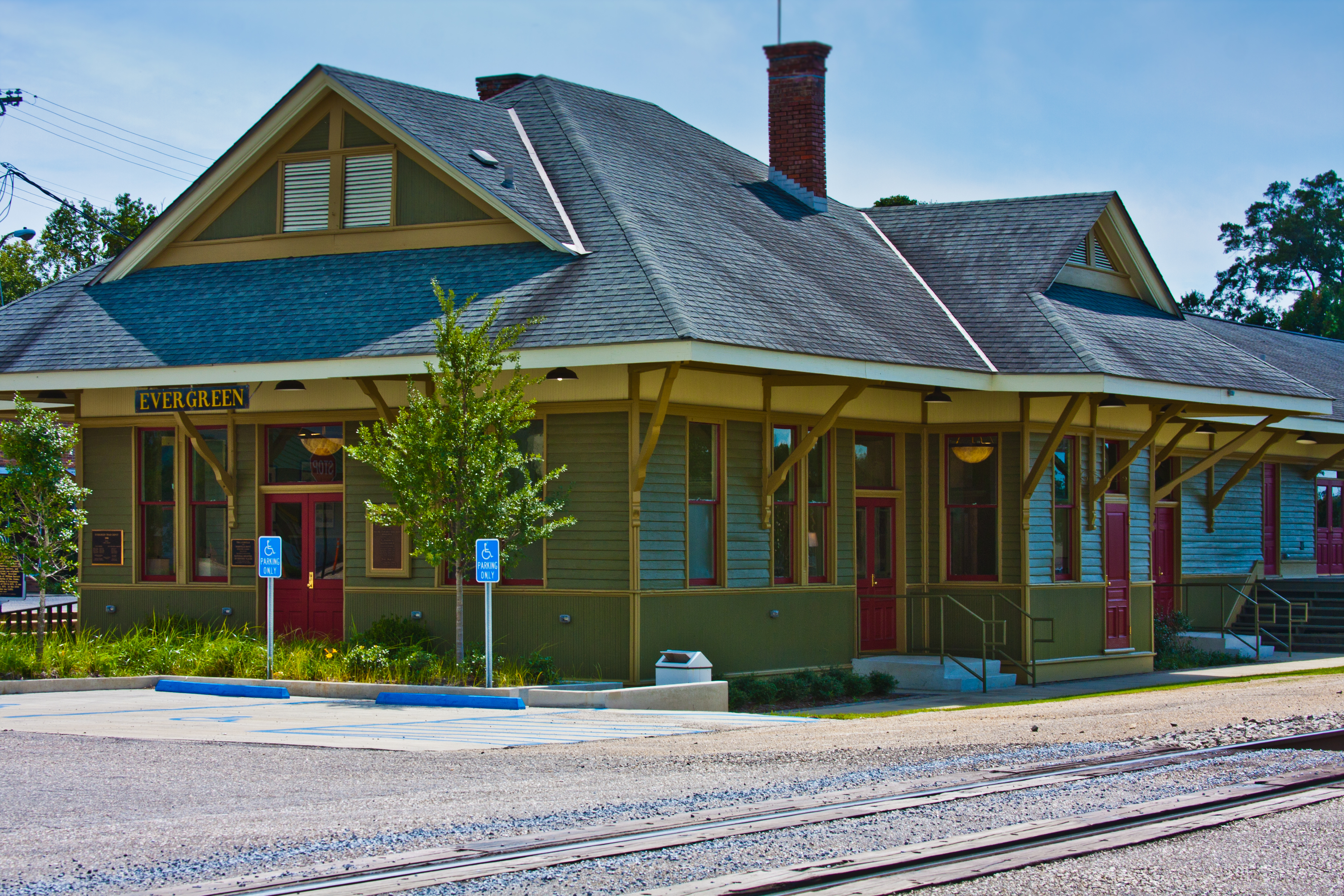
- The station building in 2012

General information
- Location: Evergreen, Alabama

Other information
- Station code: EVE

History
- Opened: 1907 (L&N); October 27, 1989 (Amtrak)
- Closed: April 1, 1995 (Amtrak)

Former services
Preceding station	Amtrak	Following station
Brewton toward Mobile	Gulf Breeze	Greenville toward Birmingham
Preceding station	Louisville and Nashville Railroad	Following station
Sparta toward New Orleans	Main Line	Owassa toward Cincinnati
- Louisville and Nashville Depot
- U.S. National Register of Historic Places
- Location within Alabama Location within the United States
- Location: SW end of Front St., Evergreen, Alabama
- Coordinates: 31°25′57.9″N 86°57′20″W
- Area: less than one acre
- Built: 1907
- Built by: Louisville & Nashville Railroad
- NRHP reference No.: 75000308
- Added to NRHP: April 3, 1975
Location

The Louisville and Nashville Depot is a historic railroad station in Evergreen, Conecuh County, Alabama, United States.

== History ==
The station building was constructed by the Louisville & Nashville Railroad in 1907 at a cost of $14,911 (equivalent to $515,228 in 2025 adjusted for inflation). During the early 19th century, the station served as a gathering place for one of the social occasions of the small town, the meeting of the Sunday afternoon train.

It was threatened by demolition during the 1970s. The station was listed on the National Register of Historic Places on April 3, 1975.

The last train service to utilize the station was Amtrak's Gulf Breeze, which stopped in Evergreen during its run from 1989 to 1995.

== Design ==
The one-story wood-frame building rests atop a low concrete foundation. It is roughly cruciform in plan, measuring 167 by 49 feet (51 m × 15 m) at its widest points.
