= MAX Transit =

Birmingham, Fairfield, Homewood, Bessemer, Hoover, Mountain Brook, Vestavia Hills

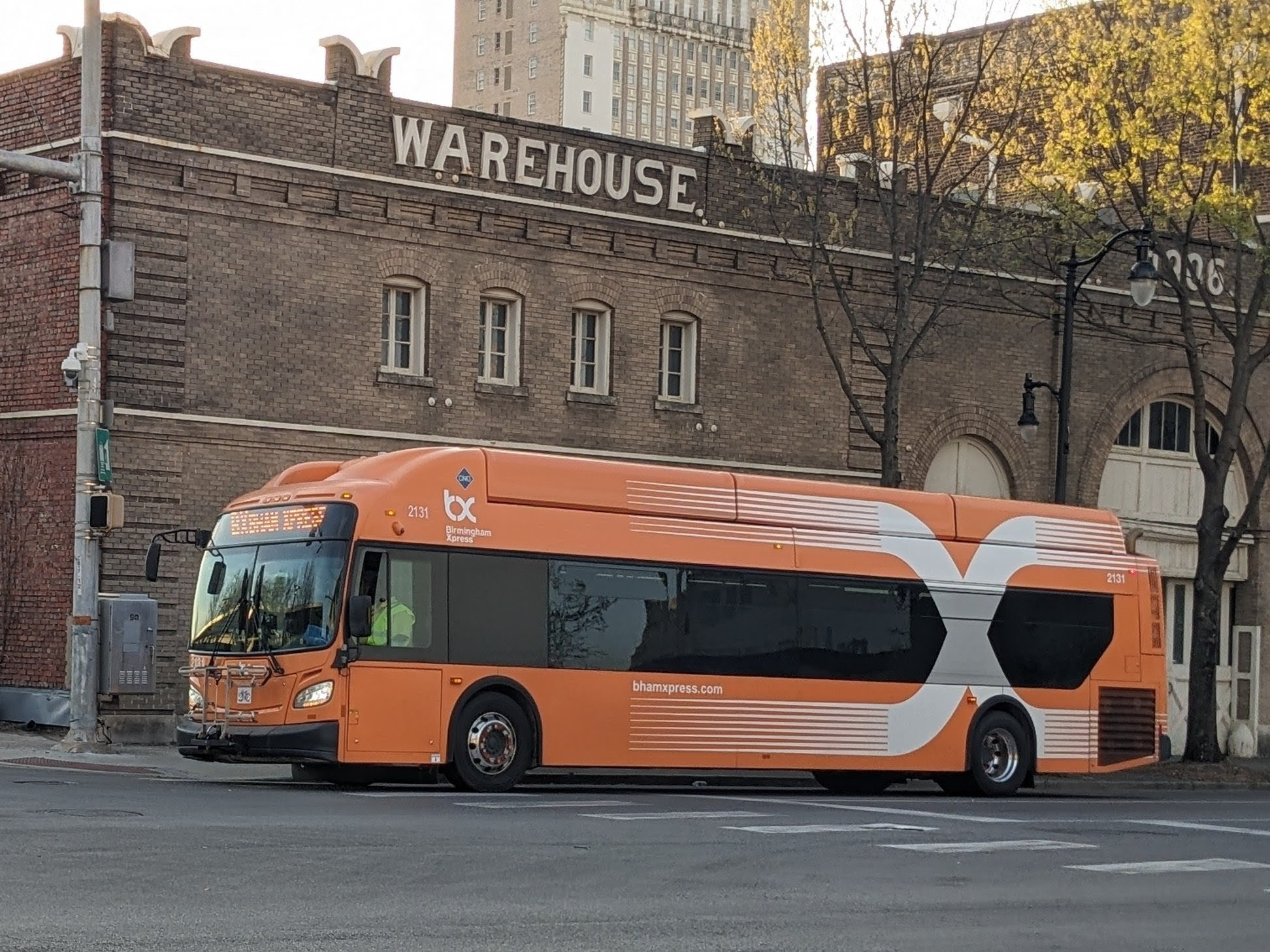
- A Birmingham Xpress bus in downtown Birmingham
- Founded: 1972
- Locale: Birmingham, Alabama
- Service area: Jefferson County, Alabama
- Service type: Bus service
- Routes: 31 fixed routes
- Fleet: 56 standard buses
- Daily ridership: 6,800 (weekdays, Q4 2025)
- Annual ridership: 1,879,300 (2025)
- Fuel type: Compressed natural gas
- Chief executive: Charlotte Shaw
- Website: maxtransit.org

The Birmingham-Jefferson County Transit Authority (BJCTA), branded as MAX Transit, is the public transportation operator in the city of Birmingham, Alabama and surrounding areas. Created in 1972 to take over transit operations from private operators, it operates 109 buses on 38 routes. It also operates paratransit services, as well as micro transit services. In 2025, the system had 1,879,300 rides, or about 6,800 per weekday as of the fourth quarter of 2025.

Alabama does not provide state support for public transit, and so the funding for and service provided by BJCTA is less than other cities of equivalent size. This contributes to Alabama's status as the state with the highest per capita gasoline consumption.

The service runs from 4:00 AM to 11:30 PM on Weekdays and from 4:00 AM to midnight on Saturdays and holidays. There is no service on Sundays.

== History ==
Logo of the BJCTA

The Birmingham-Jefferson County Transit Authority (BJCTA) was created in 1972 after the state legislature passed a law permitting the creation of public transit agencies. In 1985, BJCTA adopted the MAX branding. MAX Transit began shifting to compressed natural gas buses in the 2000s and opened the Birmingham Xpress service in 2022.

== Services ==
MAX Transit operates several bus routes as well as the Birmingham Xpress and on-demand zones.

=== Fixed routes ===
- 1 South Bessemer/UAB Medical West/Wal-Mart
- 3 Jefferson/Wenonah
- 5 Ensley/Wylam
- 6 Pratt/Ensley
- 12 Highland Avenue
- 14 Palisades/Barbara Court
- 17 Century Plaza/Eastwood Mall
- 18 Fountain Heights
- 20 Zion City/Airport
- 22 Tarrant City/Inglenook
- 23 North Birmingham/Collegeville
- 25 Center Point/Jefferson State
- 26 Jefferson State
- 31 Hwy 31 Limited Stop
- 38 Graymont/Ensley
- 39 Homewood/Wildwood
- 45 Bessemer/Jonesboro
- 45 Express/Western Hills Mall
- 48 South Powderly
- 91 East/West Dart
- 95 Westend Shuttle
- 96 Titusville Shuttle
- 280 Hwy 280 Limited Stop

=== Birmingham Xpress ===
A bus rapid transit line, named the Birmingham Xpress, was opened on September 22, 2022, running from Woodlawn to Five Points. The service will speed up journeys by offering dedicated lanes, transit signal priority, off-board fare payment and level boarding. The Birmingham Xpress was set up with funds from the federal government under the Presidency of Joe Biden. It did not receive state funds, because Alabama does not provide state funds for public transit. It has 32 stops across an east-west corridor across the city. After starting service, it quickly became the most utilized route in the BJCTA system.

=== On-Demand ===
In 2019, MAX Transit launched an on-demand service, serving downtown Birmingham. The service saw 25,000 riders in its first 11 months of operation.

== Fleet ==
- 56 standard buses
- 43 Orion VII CNG LF buses
- 22 paratransit buses

== Central station ==
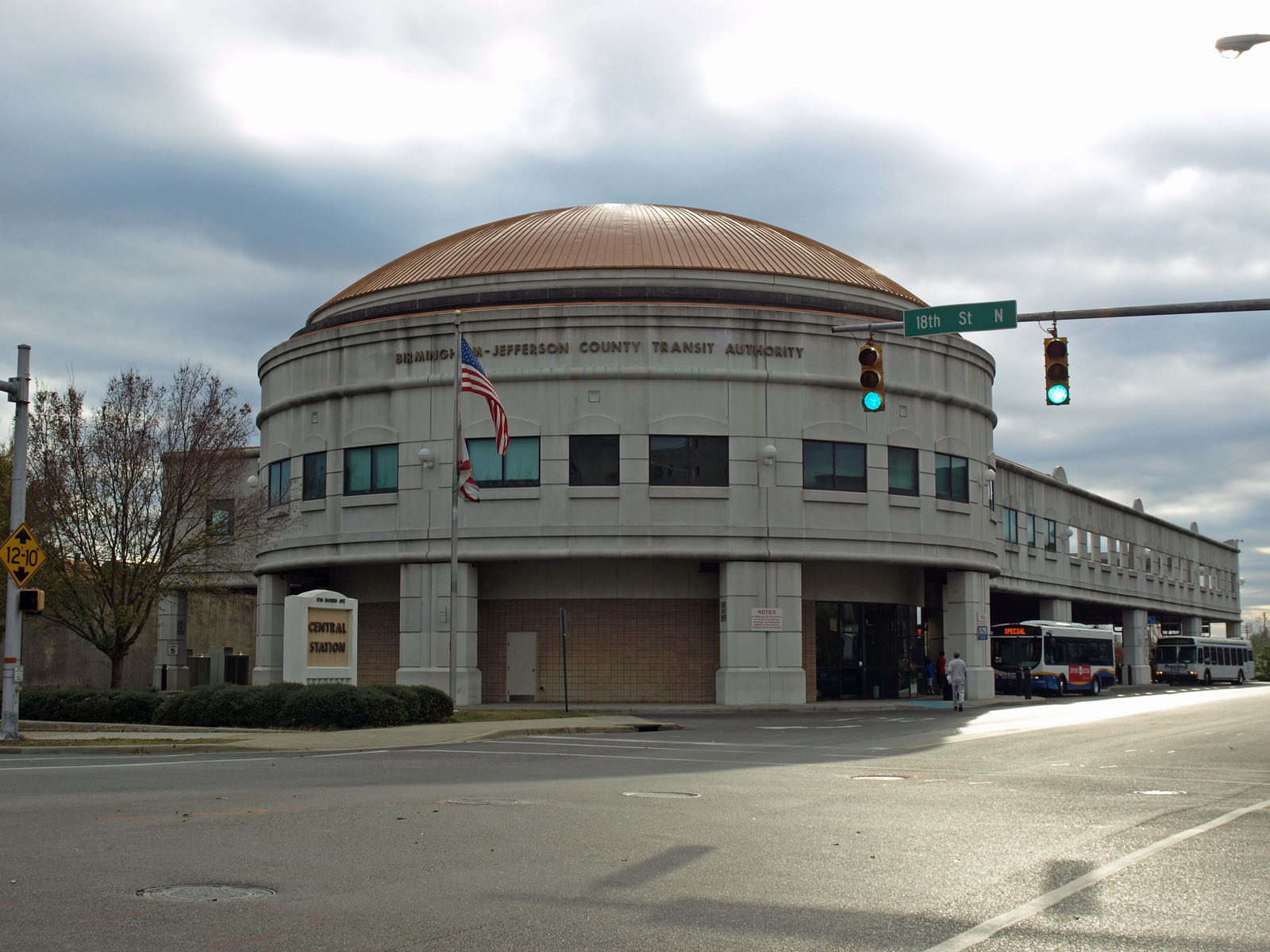
Central Station in 2011

Central Station serves as the primary transfer hub for the BJCTA system. It is located adjacent to the Amtrak station on Morris Ave. The original Central Station was built in 1999 on the site and demolished in 2015 to make way for the current facility. The $32 million project commenced in 2014. Construction was completed in 2017 with MAX Transit buses beginning service on June 19th and a ribbon cutting on June 30. The transit center contains an approximately 300 space parking lot, an indoor waiting area, and a cafe. As of 2024, it serves Max Transit, although it was intended to serve Megabus and Greyhound intercity buses too.

== Fixed route ridership ==
The ridership statistics shown here are of fixed route services only and do not include demand response services.

== See also ==
- List of bus transit systems in the United States
- Birmingham station
