= B'nai Israel Synagogue and Cemetery =

Historic site in Thomas County, Georgia, US

- U.S. National Register of Historic Places
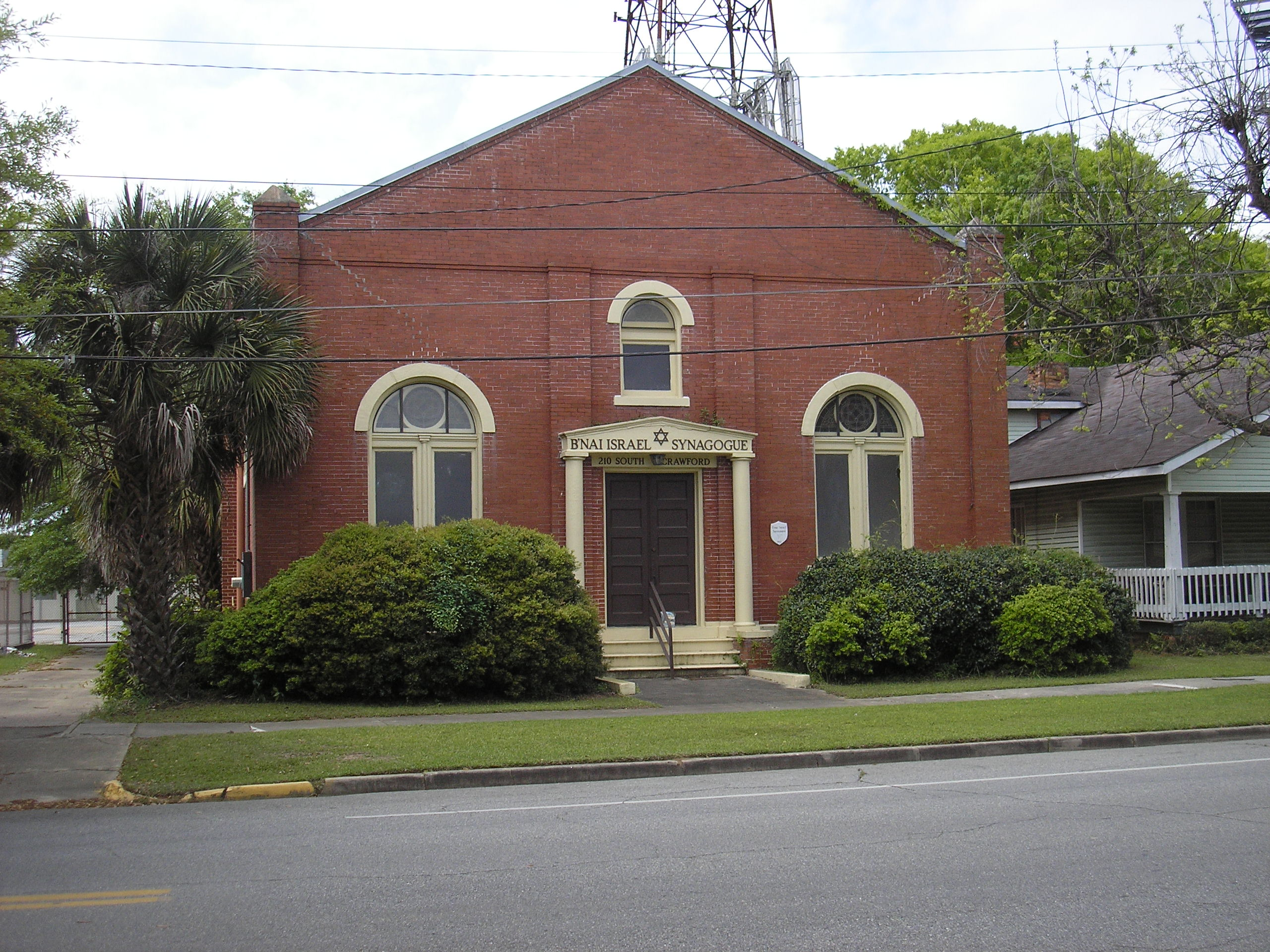

- Location within Georgia Location within the United States
- Location: 210 S. Crawford St., Thomasville, Georgia
- Coordinates: 30°51′6″N 83°59′16″W
- Area: 1.2 acres (0.49 ha)
- Built: 1913 (synagogue)
- Architectural style: Romanesque Revival
- NRHP reference No.: 97001193
- Added to NRHP: October 14, 1997

The B'nai Israel Synagogue and Cemetery in Thomasville, Georgia was listed on the National Register of Historic Places in 1997. According to its NRHP nomination, the synagogue "is the most intact example of the few surviving pre-World War II Orthodox synagogues in Georgia. These synagogues were built by Eastern European Jews arriving between 1881 and 1920."

The Jewish cemetery in Thomasville was established in 1909. It is located on the northeast outskirts of the town, about a mile from the synagogue.

The synagogue is a one-story gable-front building built in 1913 with Romanesque Revival styling. It has a pedimented entry flanked by Tuscan columns that was probably added soon after.

The synagogue's membership peaked in 1925 when there were 35 families (over 100 individuals) as members.

The synagogue is also a contributing building in the Thomasville Commercial Historic District.
