= Crestview station (Florida) =

Railway station in Crestview, Florida, United States

Crestview, FL
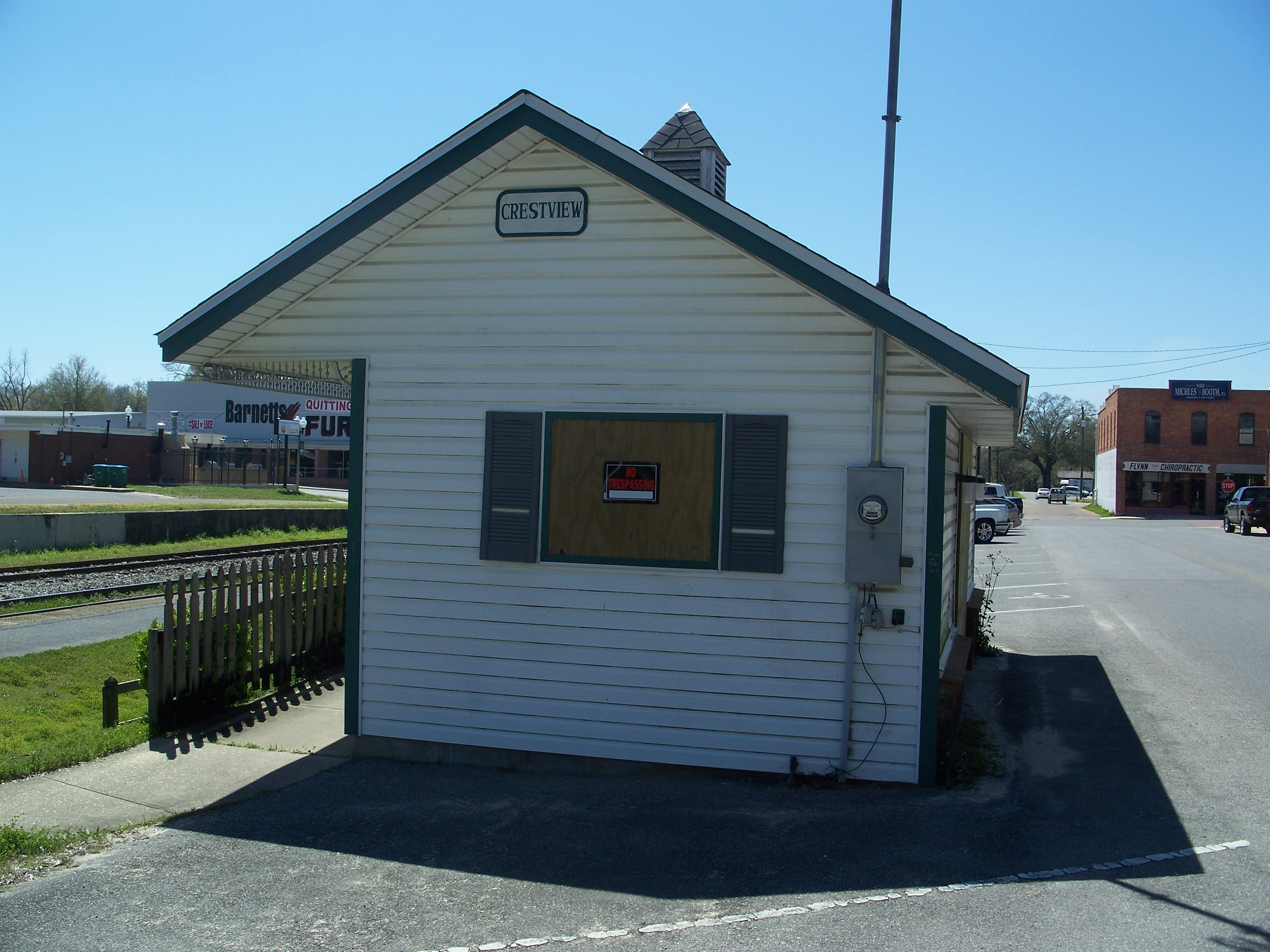

General information
- Location: 101 North Main Street; Crestview, Florida
- Coordinates: 30.757735°N 86.56922°W

Construction
- Parking: free short-term

Other information
- Status: Closed
- Station code: CSV

History
- Opened: March 31, 1993
- Closed: August 28, 2005 (service suspended)

Former services
Preceding station	Amtrak	Following station
Pensacola toward Los Angeles	Sunset Limited (1993–2005)	Chipley toward Orlando or Miami
Preceding station	Louisville and Nashville Railroad	Following station
Milligan toward Myrtlewood	Myrtlewood – Chattahoochee	Deer Land toward Chattahoochee
Location

Crestview station is a former train station in Crestview, Florida. The station was built in 1993 when the Sunset Limited was extended east to Miami. Service to the station has been suspended since Hurricane Katrina struck the Gulf Coast in 2005.

== Notable places ==
- Britton Hill, highest point in Florida.
