= Dothan station =

Historic train station in Dothan, Alabama

Dothan, AL
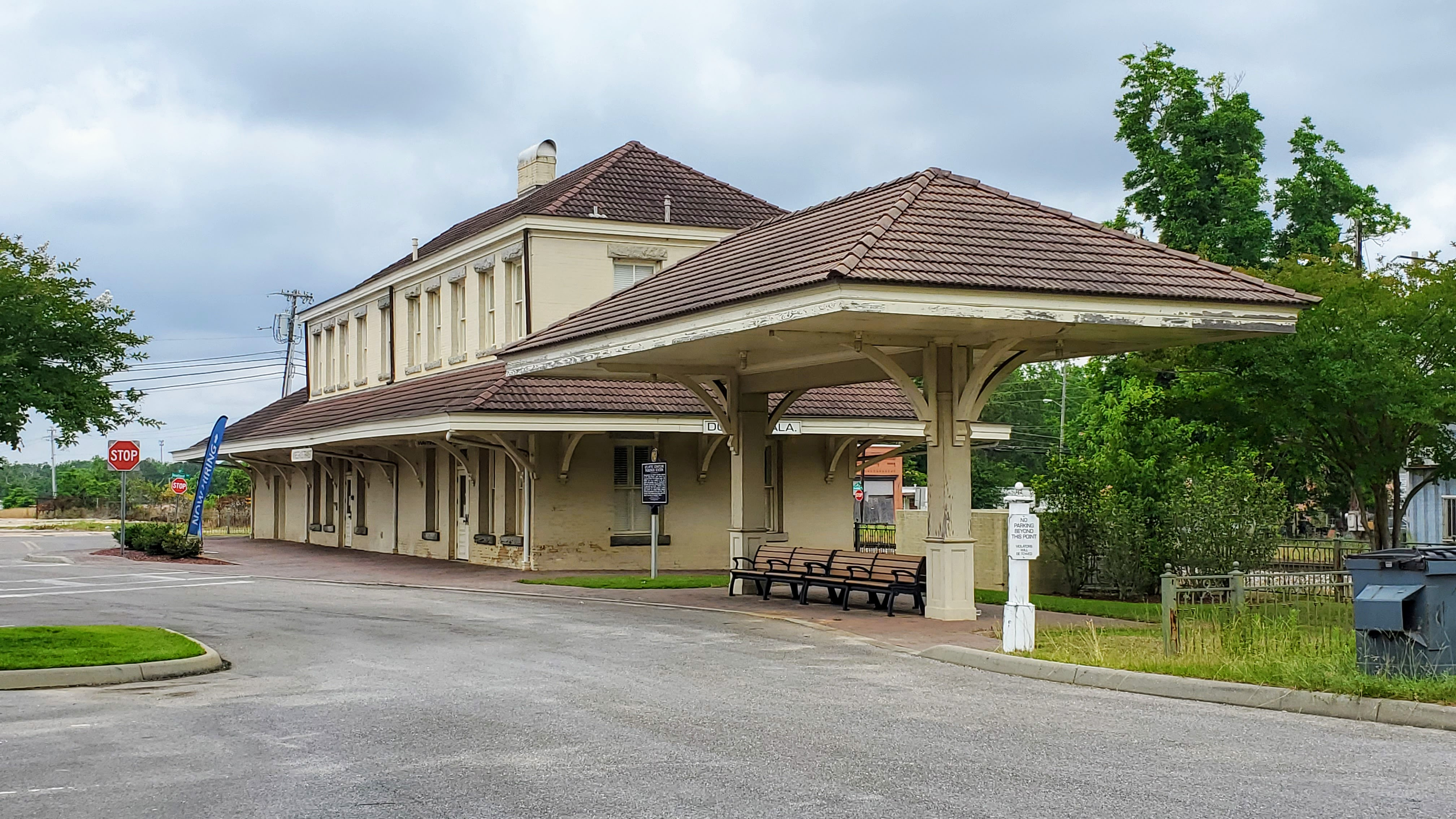

General information
- Location: Powell Avenue and Headland Avenue, Dothan, Alabama; United States
- System: Inter-city rail station
- Owner: Wiregrass Transit Authority

History
- Closed: 1979
- Rebuilt: early 2000s

Former services
| Preceding station | Amtrak | Following station |
|---|---|---|
| Thomasville toward St. Petersburg or Miami | Floridian | Montgomery toward Chicago |
| Preceding station | Atlantic Coast Line Railroad | Following station |
| Grimes toward Montgomery | Montgomery – Waycross | Cowart toward Waycross |
| Terminus | Dothan – Abbeville | Grimes toward Abbeville |
| Grimes toward Elba | Elba – Dothan | Terminus |
- Atlantic Coastline Railroad Passenger Depot
- U.S. National Register of Historic Places
- Alabama Register of Landmarks and Heritage
- Location within Alabama Location within the United States
- Location: Jct. of Powell St. and Headland Ave., Dothan, Alabama
- Coordinates: 31°13′50″N 85°23′30″W
- Area: less than one acre
- Built: 1907
- NRHP reference No.: 93001519

Significant dates
- Added to NRHP: January 21, 1994
- Designated ARLH: August 3, 1990
Location

The Dothan station, also known as Atlantic Coastline Railroad Passenger Depot, is a historic train station in Dothan, Alabama, United States. It was built in 1907 as the largest and busiest on the Atlantic Coast Line Railroad between Montgomery, Alabama, and Thomasville, Georgia and replaced a former freight depot. The Atlantic Coast Line merged with the Seaboard Air Line Railroad in 1967 to form the Seaboard Coast Line Railroad. In 1971, Amtrak took over passenger rail service in the United States and Dothan station was served by the Floridian until 1979.

The depot is two stories, with a one-story portion on the western third. The first story's hipped roof wraps around the entire building, and has deep eaves supported by large brackets. All windows are two-over-two sashes with heavy granite sills and lintels. Double-leaf doors with transoms led to the two waiting rooms. The track side has a projecting bay that served as the ticketing window.

The station was listed on the National Register of Historic Places in 1994.
