= Gulf Breeze (train) =

Former intercity Amtrak service

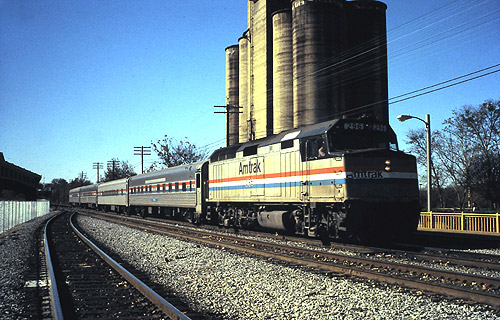
- The Gulf Breeze at Montgomery in June 1990

Overview
- Service type: Inter-city rail
- System: Amtrak
- Status: Discontinued
- Locale: Eastern United States
- First service: October 27, 1989
- Last service: April 1, 1995
- Former operator: Amtrak

Route
- Termini: New York, New York; Mobile, Alabama
- Stops: 31
- Distance travelled: 1,299 miles (2,091 km) (New York–Mobile); 275 miles (443 km) (Birmingham–Mobile)
- Service frequency: Daily each way
- Train number: 519, 520

On-board services
- Classes: Standard and first class
- Seating arrangements: Reserved Coach Seat
- Sleeping arrangements: Roomette; Bedrooms
- Catering facilities: Dining Car; Lounge Car
- Baggage facilities: Checked baggage available at stations north of Birmingham

Technical
- Track gauge: 4 ft 8 1/2 in (1,435 mm)
- Track owner: CSX Transportation

The Gulf Breeze was a daily passenger train operated by Amtrak between New York City and Mobile, Alabama, as a section of the Crescent. Southbound, the Gulf Breeze split from the Crescent in Birmingham to serve an additional seven stations in Alabama on a 275-mile (443 km) route south to Mobile. The service ran from 1989 until 1995.

== History ==
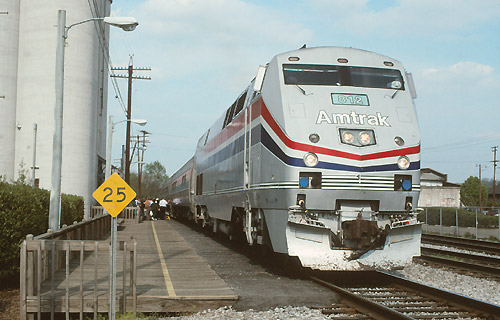
The Gulf Breeze at Montgomery in March 1995, days before being discontinued

Amtrak introduced the Gulf Breeze on October 27, 1989, as a section of the Crescent (New York City–New Orleans). Costs of operation were split between Amtrak and the state, with the latter contributing about $1.3 million per year. Annual ridership in FY 1994, the last full year of operation, was 7,737. In December 1994 Amtrak announced that the Gulf Breeze would be discontinued as part of a broad cost-cutting measure which saw other services eliminated or reduced. The last Gulf Breeze ran on April 1, 1995, and was replaced by bus service.

Later that year attempts were made under the auspices of the Southern High Speed Rail Commission to resurrect the Gulf Breeze as a Mobile–New Orleans service, sharing part of the Sunset Limited's route. This was eventually realized as the Gulf Coast Limited, a joint effort between Alabama, Mississippi and Louisiana which operated 1996–1997.

== Route ==
The Gulf Breeze split from the Crescent at Birmingham and ran south through Montgomery to Mobile on the Gulf of Mexico, while the Crescent continued southwest through Mississippi to New Orleans. At the time Mobile was served also by the Sunset Limited (Orlando, Florida–Los Angeles, California).

As of 2025, Birmingham (served by the Crescent), and Mobile (served by the Mardi Gras Service) are the only Gulf Breeze stations still in operation. Atmore was served by the Sunset Limited from 1993 to 2005. The remaining stations have not seen passenger rail service since the cancellation of the Gulf Breeze.

== Station stops ==
State	Miles (km)	Town/City	Station
Crescent to/from New York City
AL	1,024 (1,648)	Birmingham	Birmingham
AL	1,120 (1,800)	Montgomery	Montgomery
AL	1,164 (1,873)	Greenville	Greenville
AL	1,201 (1,933)	Evergreen	Evergreen
AL	1,225 (1,971)	Brewton	Brewton
AL	1,254 (2,018)	Atmore	Atmore
AL	1,274 (2,050)	Bay Minette	Bay Minette
AL	1,299 (2,091)	Mobile	Mobile
