= Pensacola station (Amtrak) =

Former train station in Pensacola, Florida

Pensacola, FL
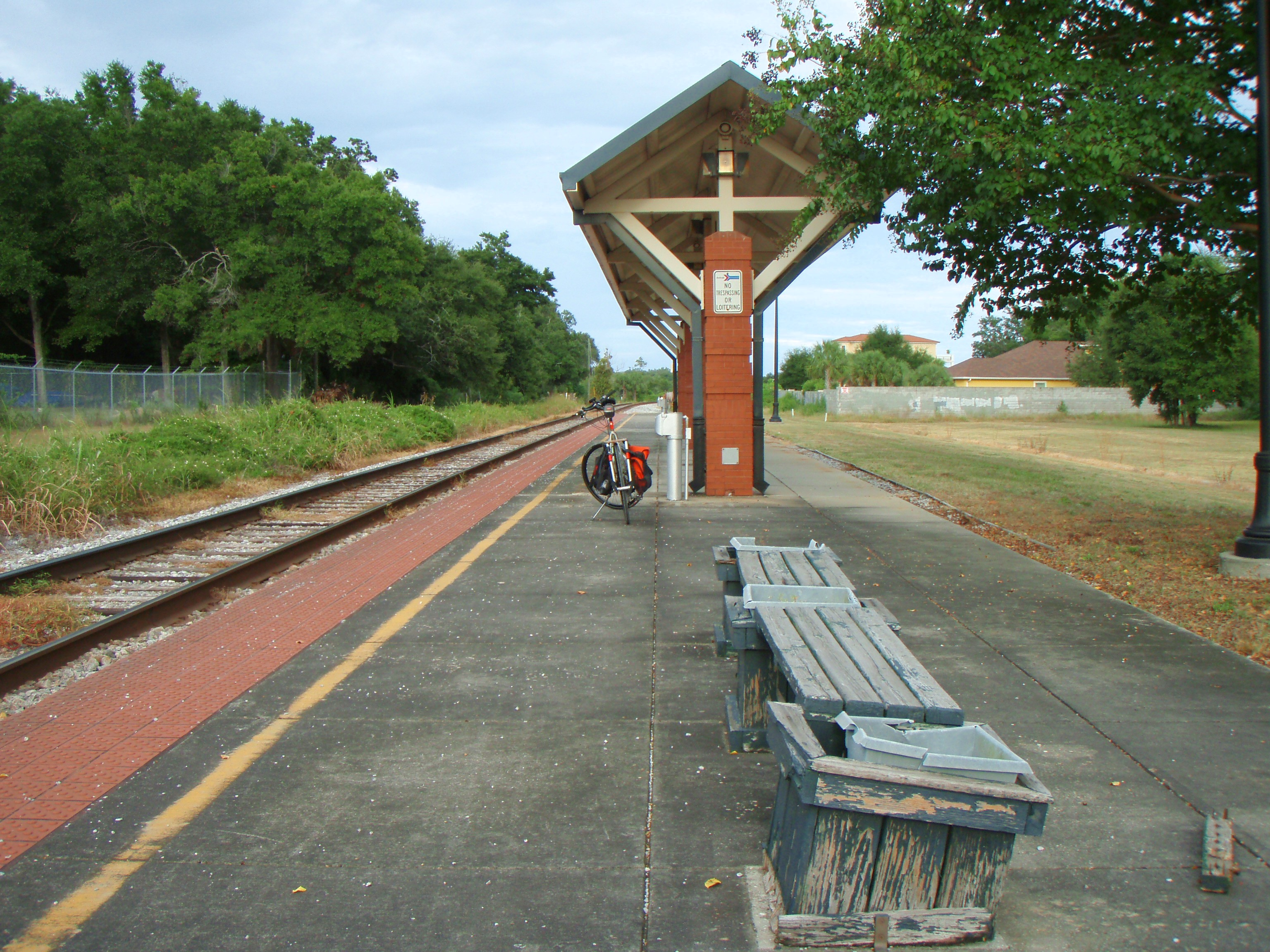
- Pensacola station in September 2010

General information
- Location: 980 East Heinberg Street; Pensacola, Florida
- Coordinates: 30.41971°N 87.19735°W
- Platforms: 1 side platform
- Tracks: 1

Other information
- Status: Closed
- Station code: PNS

History
- Opened: March 21, 1993
- Closed: 28 August 2005
Former services
Preceding station	Amtrak	Following station
Atmore toward Los Angeles	Sunset Limited (1993–2005)	Crestview toward Orlando or Miami
Location

Pensacola station is a former train station in Pensacola, Florida. It was served by Amtrak, the national railroad passenger system. The station served as a replacement for the former Louisville and Nashville Passenger Station and Express Building. Service has been suspended since 2005, when Hurricane Katrina struck Pensacola. In late 2021, the station building was converted into a veterans memorial museum.
