= Cullman station (Louisville and Nashville Railroad) =

- Louisville and Nashville Railroad Depot
- U.S. National Register of Historic Places
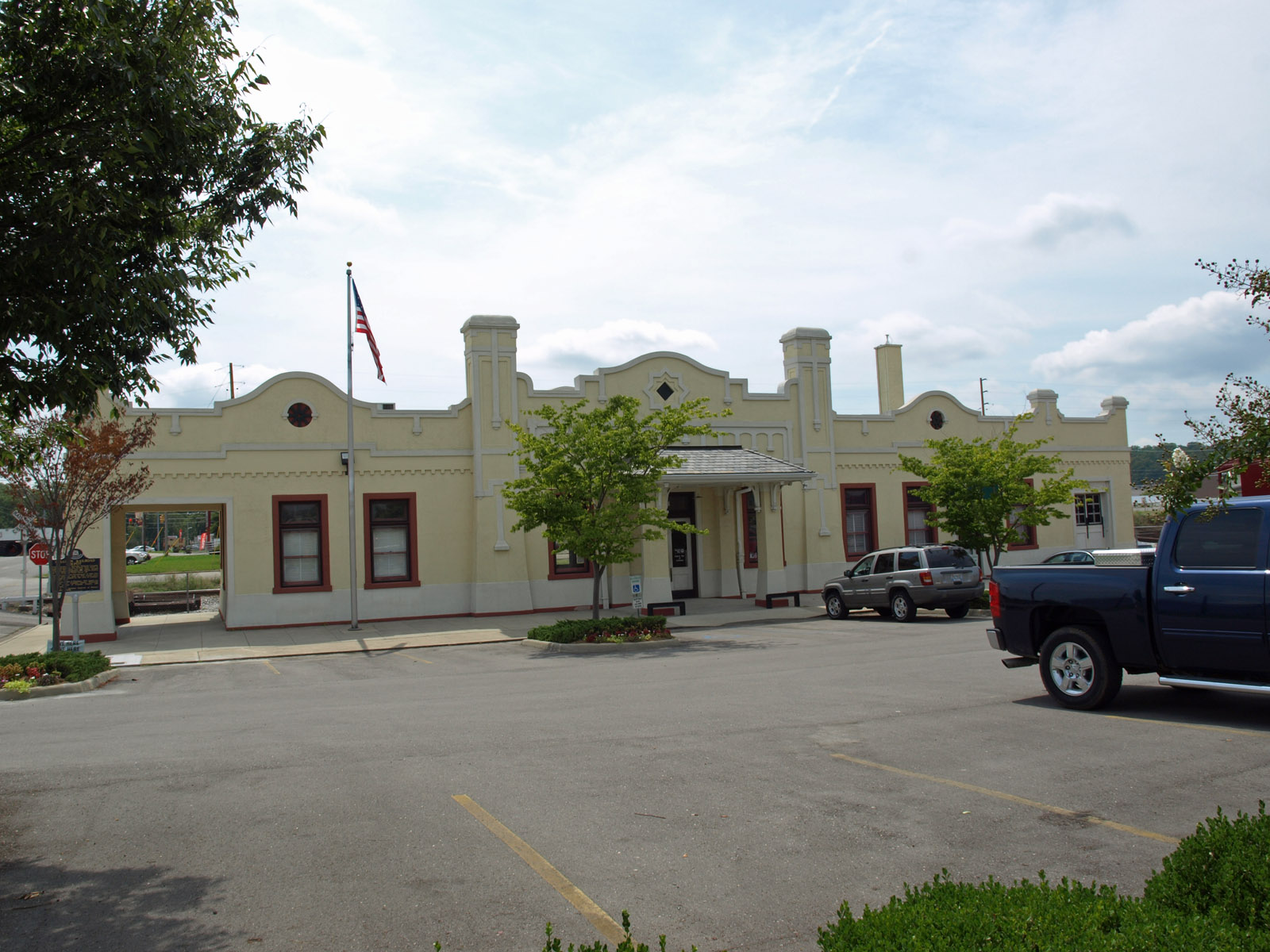
- The depot in July 2012

- Location within Alabama Location within the United States
- Location: 309 1st Ave., NE, Cullman, Alabama
- Coordinates: 34°10′48″N 86°50′39″W
- Area: less than one acre
- Built: 1913
- Built by: Louisville & Nashville Railroad
- Architectural style: Mission Revival/Spanish Revival
- NRHP reference No.: 76000320
- Added to NRHP: June 17, 1976

The Louisville and Nashville Railroad Depot is a historic train station in Cullman, Alabama, United States. The depot was built in 1913 as a replacement for Cullman's original station. Cullman's founder, John G. Cullmann, gave money to the city upon his death in 1895 to lower the Louisville and Nashville Railroad tracks through town, in order to reduce noise and pollution. The plan was not enacted until 1911, when the L&N laid double tracks through the town, necessitating the construction of a new depot. The depot served passengers until 1968, and was used for maintenance storage by new owners CSX until it was sold to the city in 1990. It was restored and now houses offices for the local United Way chapter.

The depot is built in Mission Revival style, unique among otherwise standard and less stylized L&N depot designs. The center section of the three-bay building is separated by two piers which rise above the parapet. The piers have shallow pyramidal tops, and are decorated with recessed panels and horizontal banding. In the central bay lies the main entrance, covered by a hipped roof portico which is supported by heavy square columns and brackets. The parapet is arched in each bay of the façade, and in the center bay of the rear, track-facing side. Each bay features 2 one-over-one sash windows with single-light transoms. The north end of the building has a set of carriage doors, originally leading to the baggage area, while the south end has a covered porch that leads to the tracks.

The depot was listed on the National Register of Historic Places in 1976.

Preceding station	Louisville and Nashville Railroad	Following station
White City toward New Orleans	Main Line	South Vinemont toward Cincinnati
