= Chipley station =

Railway station in Chipley, Florida, United States

Chipley, FL
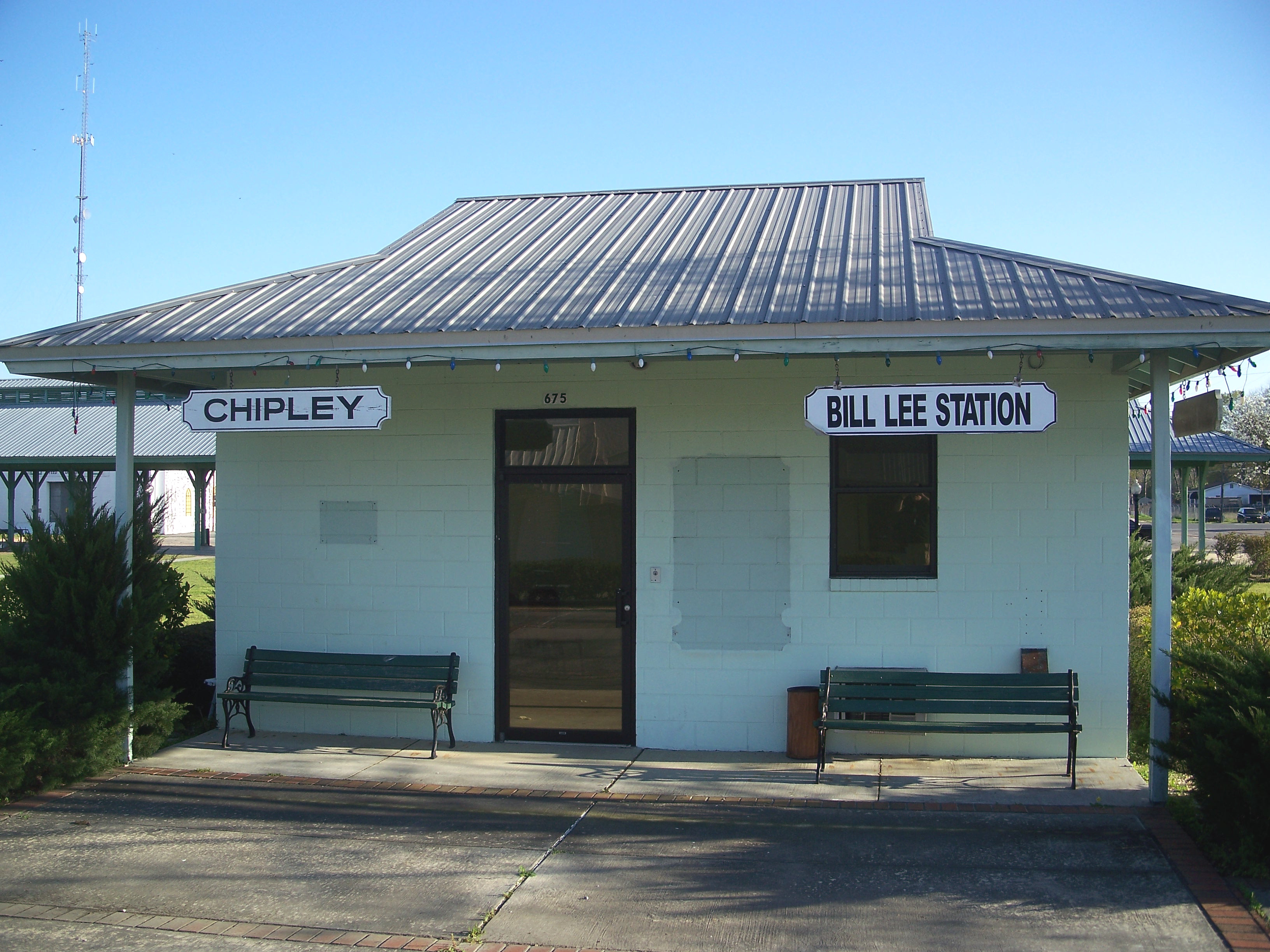

General information
- Other names: Bill Lee Station
- Location: 675 7th Street; Chipley, Florida
- Coordinates: 30.780748°N 85.53763°W

Other information
- Status: Closed
- Station code: CIP

History
- Opened: March 31, 1993
- Closed: August 28, 2005 (service suspended)

Former services
Preceding station	Amtrak	Following station
Crestview toward Los Angeles	Sunset Limited (1993–2005)	Tallahassee toward Orlando or Miami
Preceding station	Louisville and Nashville Railroad	Following station
Bonifay toward Myrtlewood	Myrtlewood – Chattahoochee	Cottondale toward Chattahoochee
Location

Chipley station is a former intercity railroad station in Chipley, Florida. It is currently the headquarters of the Washington County Historical Society. The grounds include two former train stations: the Louisville and Nashville Depot and Bill Lee Station. The station was served by Amtrak's Sunset Limited train until service was suspended after Hurricane Katrina struck in 2005. Amtrak has proposed reopening the station as part of a restored Sunset Limited route in the future.

== History ==
Chipley, Florida, named for William Dudley Chipley, came into existence as a stop on the Pensacola and Atlantic Railroad around 1882. The P&A was absorbed by the Louisville and Nashville Railroad, who built the Louisville and Nashville Depot in downtown Chipley. Later, rail service was moved to a smaller building close to the tracks, Bill Lee Station. This served as Chipley's stop on Amtrak's Sunset Limited until 2005, when Amtrak suspended the Sunset Limited east of New Orleans after Hurricane Katrina. The old L&N depot became a farmers' market and the headquarters of the Washington County Chamber of Commerce. In 2010, the Washington County Historical Society acquired the site, including both buildings, and adapted them as a museum and headquarters.

== Notable places ==
- Falling Waters State Park
