= Stanford station (Kentucky) =

- Baughman's Mill and Stanford Railroad Depot
- U.S. National Register of Historic Places
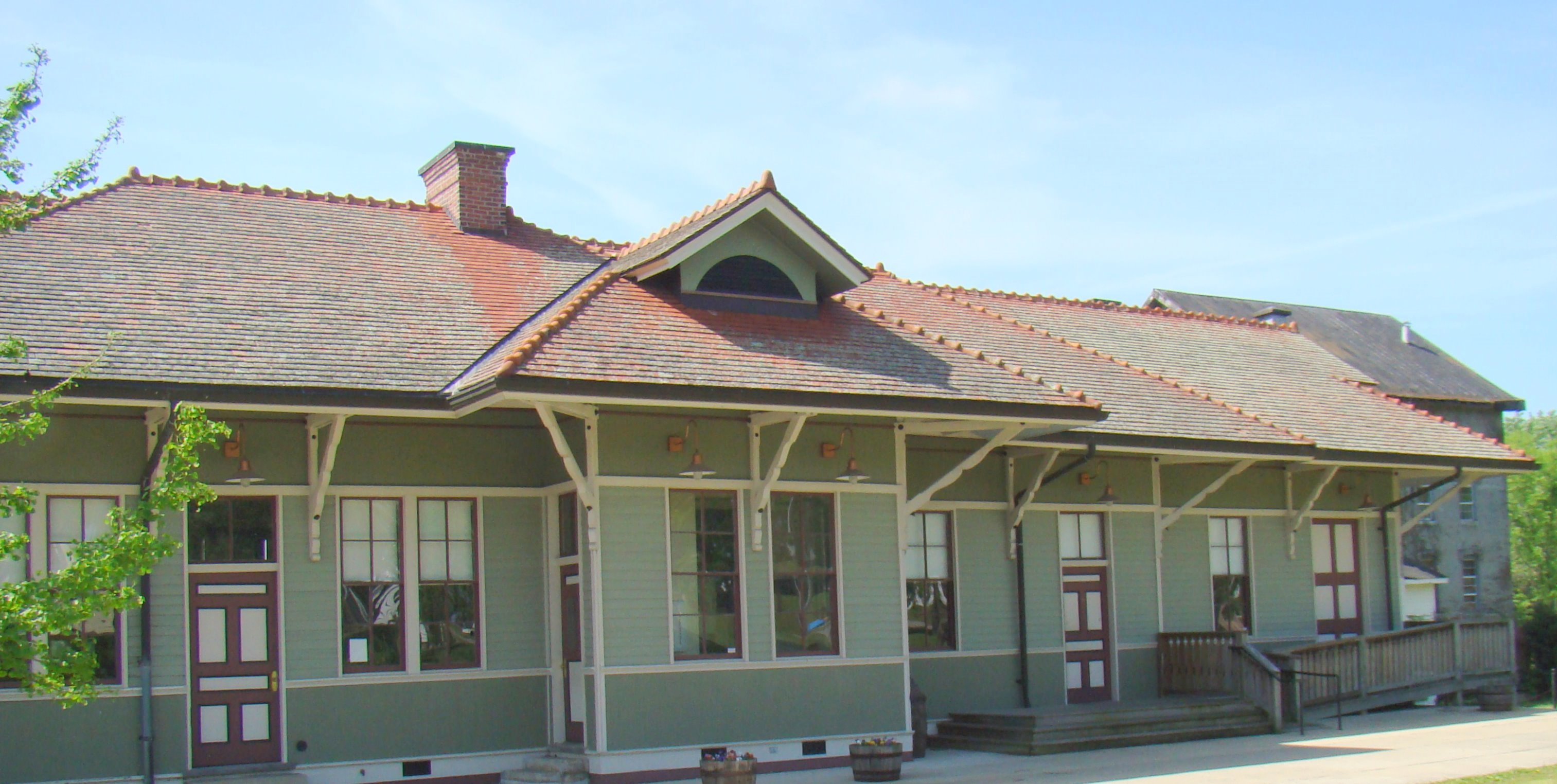
- Stanford L&N Railroad Depot

- Location within Kentucky Location within the United States
- Location: Depot and Mill Sts., Stanford, Kentucky
- Coordinates: 37°31′49.9″N 84°39′47.2″W
- Built: 1911
- NRHP reference No.: 78001373
- Added to NRHP: March 29, 1978

Stanford L&N Railroad Depot, also known as Baughman's Mill and Stanford Railroad Depot, is a historic train depot located in Stanford, Kentucky. It was built in 1911 and was used by the Louisville and Nashville Railroad.

== History ==
The original station was built in 1866, with the first train arriving at the station on May 17, 1866. It was the culmination of Ambrose Burnside's goal of easier supply transport in central Kentucky. Burnside had preferred the line from Lebanon to go Danville, Kentucky, not Stanford, but compromised with the L&N, which hoped to use the line to eventually connect to the eastern Kentucky coal mines and to Knoxville, Tennessee. Government assistance for building the line to Stanford lasted for only three months of 1863 and 1864, and the railroad had to pay for further development. The rise of coal mining in eastern Kentucky ensured the usefulness of the depot to the citizens of Lincoln County. Due to the first station, Stanford's economy was finally connected to the rest of the states, and the 1870s and 1880s saw major economic expansion.

The current building replaced the previous building in 1911, at a cost of $11,939. The depot served as a railroad terminal until July 8, 1987.

The depot was placed on the National Register of Historic Places in 1978, because so many small-town depots were being destroyed.

Currently the depot is used as a museum, community center, and park.

== Description ==
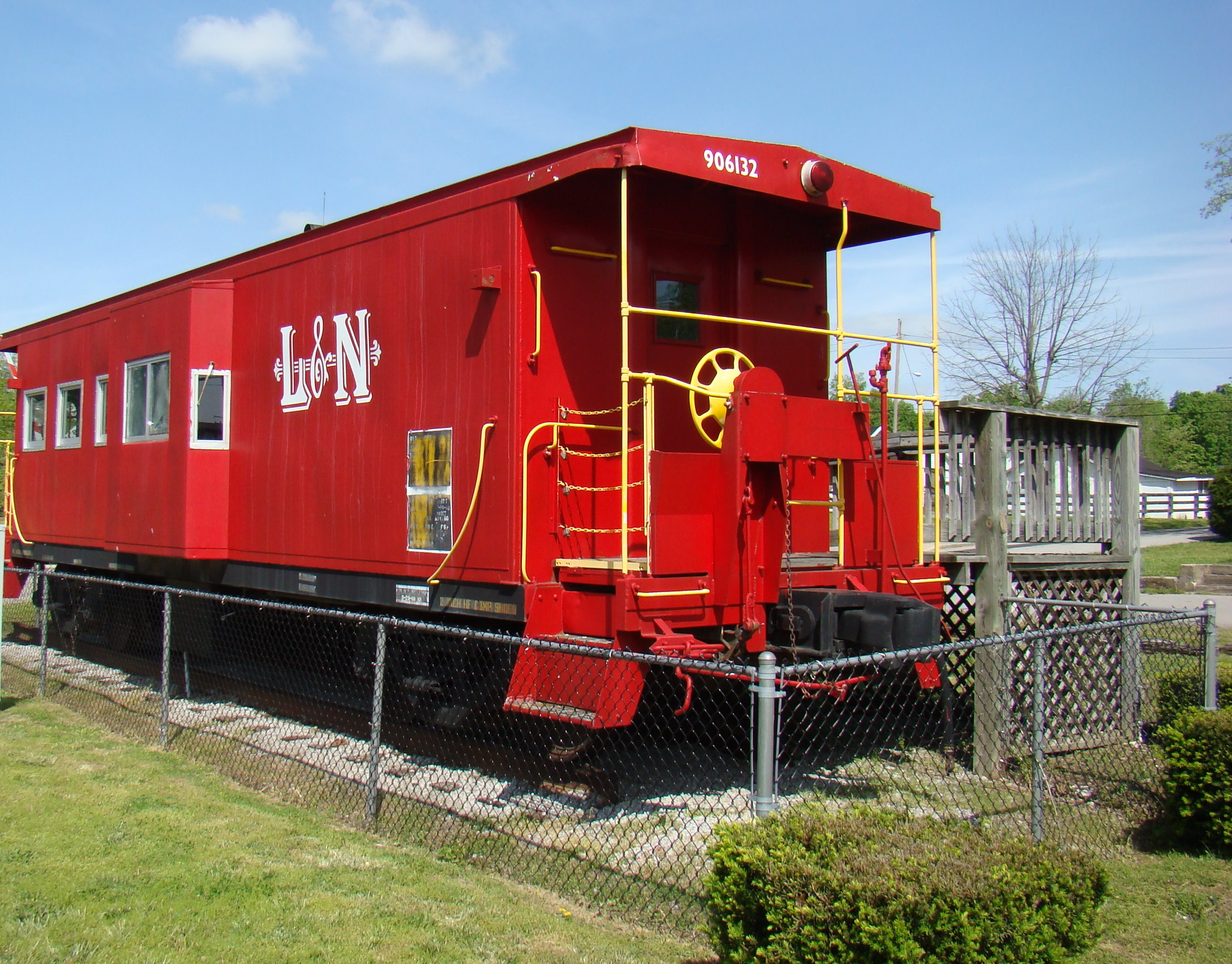
Caboose on display at Stanford Railroad Depot

The depot is a rectangular frame building placed upon a gentle slope with a red brick foundation. An office for the Stationmaster is the only extension from the mostly rectangular building. Weatherboarding and narrow tongue-and-groove paneling are used in combination to cover the structure's outside walls.

The roof is gable-on-top red tile. The central ridgeline and roof angles all have ornate red barrel tile.

There were several individual rooms within the station. When first built, it had a waiting room for women, one for blacks, and a baggage room, and the Stationmaster's office among them.

A similar depot, the Shelbyville L & N Railroad Depot in Shelbyville, Kentucky, was placed on the National Register in 1975.
