= Nashville station (Illinois) =

- Louisville and Nashville Depot
- U.S. National Register of Historic Places
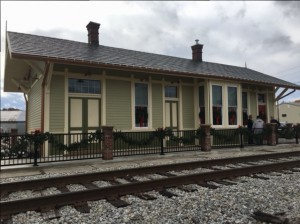

- Location within Illinois Location within the United States
- Location: 101 East Railroad Street, Nashville, Illinois
- Coordinates: 38°20′54″N 89°22′53″W
- Area: 0.2 acres (0.081 ha)
- Built: 1885
- NRHP reference No.: 85000496
- Added to NRHP: March 1, 1985

The Louisville and Nashville Depot, located at 101 East Railroad Street in Nashville, Illinois, is the city's former Louisville and Nashville Railroad station. The station was built in 1885 as part of the L&N's expansion through Southern Illinois in the 1880s. The building has a simple vernacular design common to L&N depots in small towns, which were intended to be functional rather than elaborate. The railroad exported the products of Washington County's industries, which included coal, dairy products, grain, and lumber, through the station; it also imported goods such as automobiles, fertilizer, and commercial products. In addition, the railroad provided passenger service to Nashville; at the peak of service, seven daily passenger trains stopped at the depot, and students in other parts of the county used the trains to attend Nashville's high school. The depot also served as an information center for Nashville; the city's telegraph station was located at the depot, and St. Louis daily newspapers arrived by train. The depot remained in service as late as the 1950s but closed sometime prior to 1984.

The depot was added to the National Register of Historic Places on March 1, 1985.

It was renovated in 2015, 115 years after it was built. It is now used by the Washington County Historical Society as a museum.

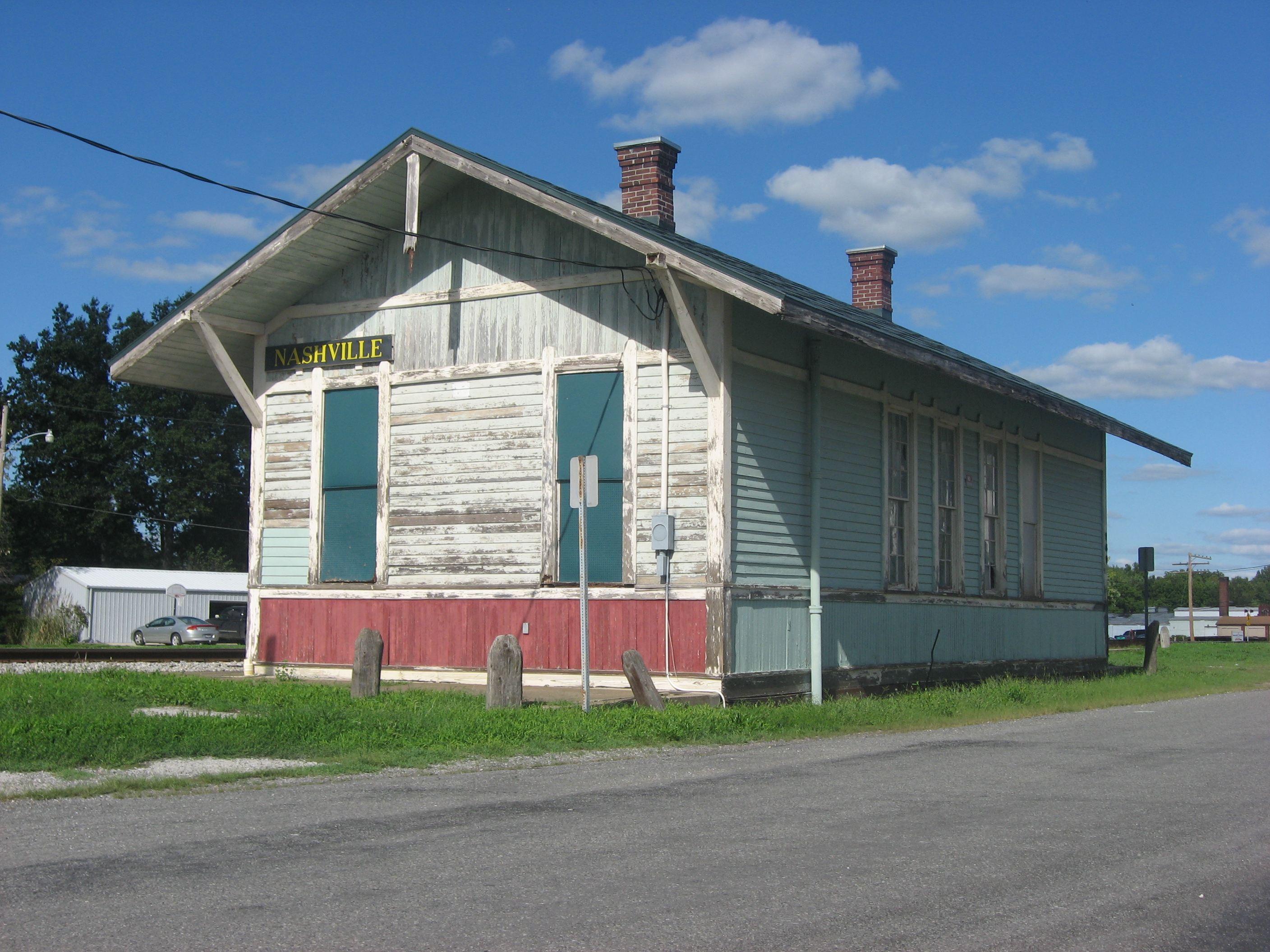
Depot before 2015 renovation

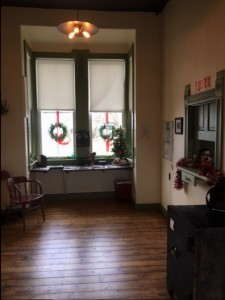
The Christmas decorated interior after the 2015 renovation.

Preceding station	Louisville and Nashville Railroad	Following station
Addieville toward St. Louis	St. Louis – Nashville	Beaucoup toward Nashville
Addieville toward St. Louis	St. Louis – Louisville	Beaucoup toward Louisville
