= Montgomery Union Station =

Historic train station in Montgomery, Alabama

Montgomery, AL
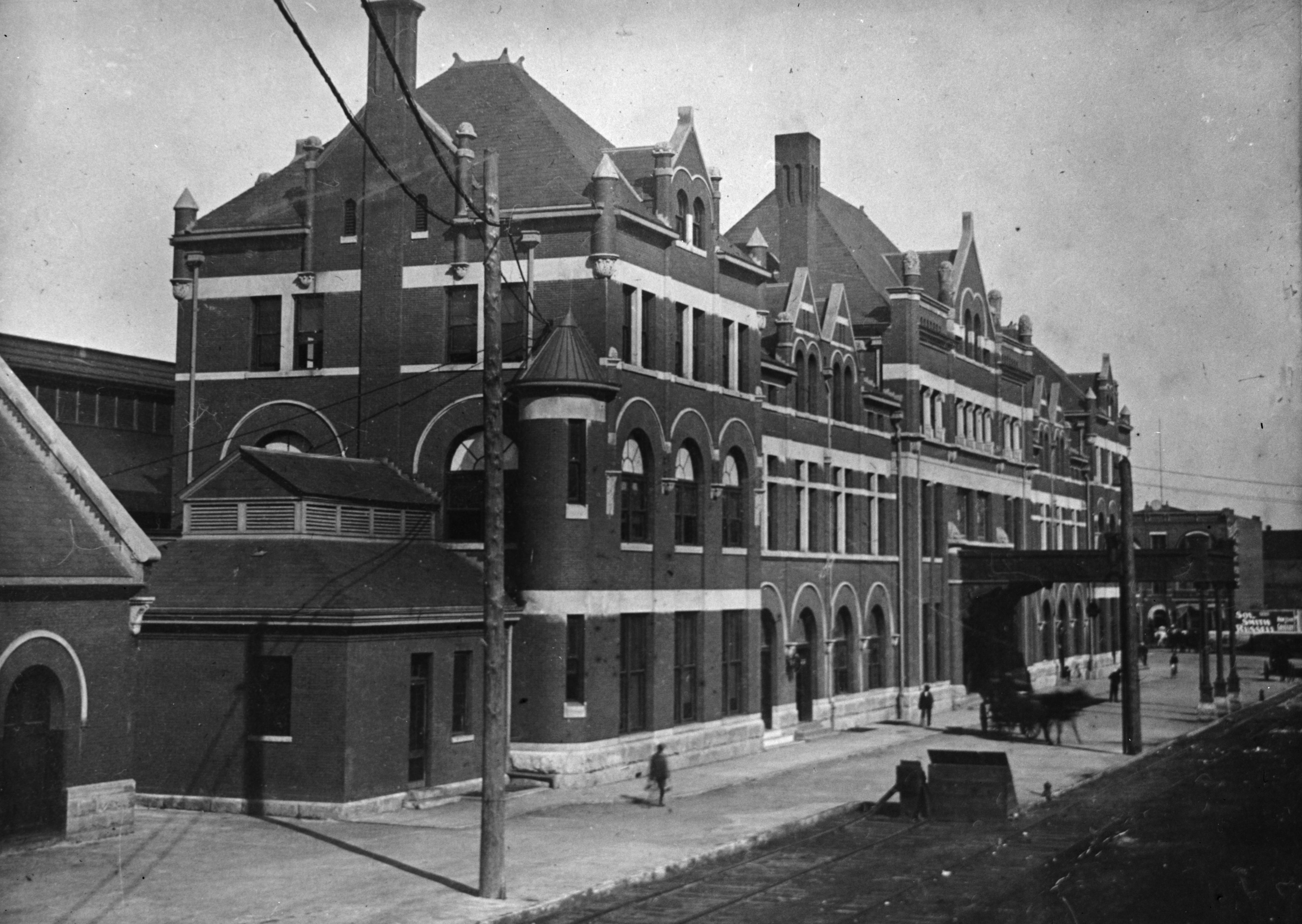
- Montgomery Union Station, c. 1900

General information
- Location: Montgomery, Alabama; USA
- System: inter-city rail station

History
- Opened: 1898
- Closed: 1979

Former services (at 1989–1995 station)
Preceding station	Amtrak	Following station
Greenville toward Mobile	Gulf Breeze	Birmingham Terminus

Former services (at Union Station)
Preceding station	Amtrak	Following station
Dothan toward St. Petersburg or Miami	Floridian	Birmingham toward Chicago
Preceding station	Atlantic Coast Line Railroad	Following station
Terminus	Montgomery – Waycross	Sprague toward Waycross
Preceding station	Central of Georgia Railway	Following station
Terminus	Montgomery – Smithville	Keyton toward Smithville
Preceding station	Louisville and Nashville Railroad	Following station
McGehees toward New Orleans	Main Line	Jackson's Lake toward Cincinnati
Preceding station	Seaboard Air Line Railroad	Following station
Terminus	Montgomery – Savannah	Merry toward Savannah
Preceding station	West Point Route	Following station
Terminus	Main Line	Madison toward Atlanta
- Montgomery Union Station and Trainshed
- U.S. National Register of Historic Places
- U.S. National Historic Landmark
- Coordinates: 32°22′50″N 86°18′51″W
- Built: 1897
- Architect: Benjamin Bosworth Smith
- Architectural style: Romanesque
- NRHP reference No.: 73000368

Significant dates
- Added to NRHP: July 24, 1973
- Designated NHL: December 8, 1976
Location

Montgomery Union Station and Trainshed is a historic former train station in Montgomery, Alabama. Built in 1898 by the Louisville and Nashville Railroad, rail service to the station ended in 1979 and it has since been adapted for use by the Montgomery Area Visitor Center and commercial tenants. It was added to the National Register of Historic Places in 1973 and became a National Historic Landmark in 1976.

== History ==
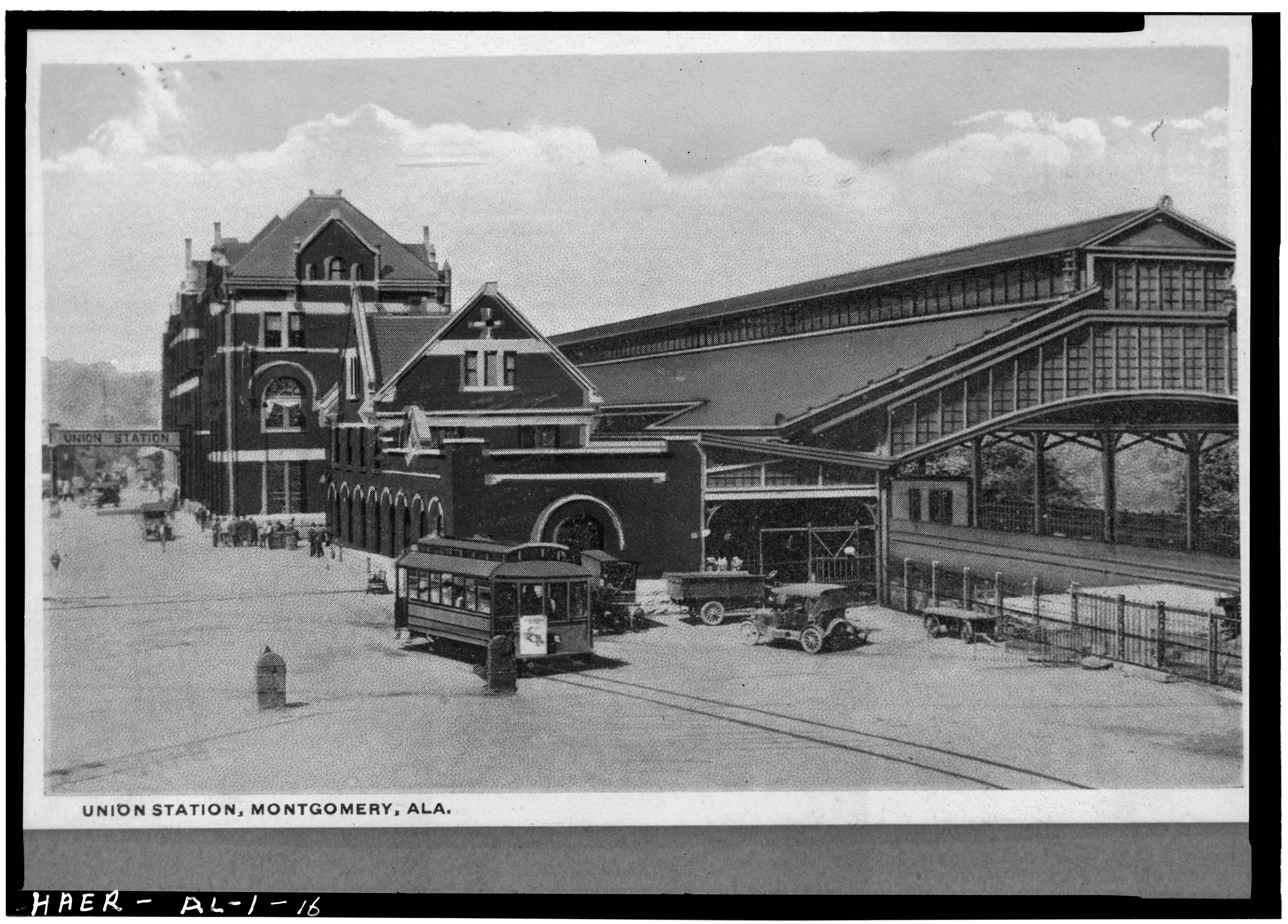
Postcard of Union Station, Alabama Archives - c. 1915

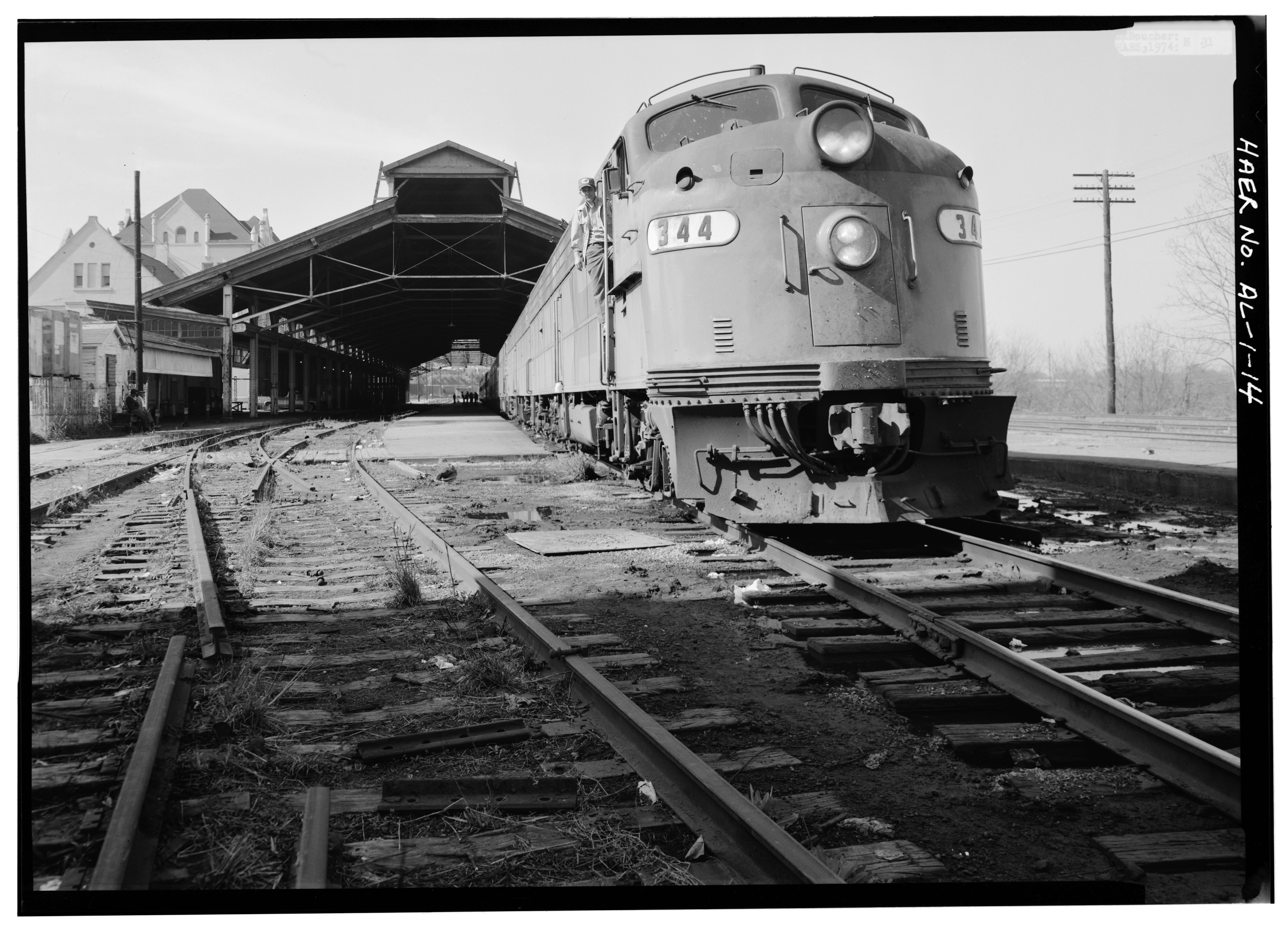
An Amtrak train under the Union Station Train Shed, 1974.

Erected of brick and limestone on a high bluff along the Alabama River, the station was built by Louisville and Nashville Railroad (L&N) in 1898. The station also served passenger trains of Atlantic Coast Line, Western Railway of Alabama, Seaboard Air Line, Central of Georgia, and Gulf, Mobile and Ohio Railroad. The station had six tracks under a 600-foot-long (180 m) shed, with a coach yard on the south end of the station as well as a Railway Express Agency facility. The station's design segregated passengers by race and incorporated Romanesque Revival elements.

L&N trains using the station included the Azalean, Florida Arrow, Humming Bird, Pan-American and South Wind. Traditionally, the Southern Railway's Crescent and Piedmont Limited were routed through the station.

The number of passenger trains using Union Station declined during the 1950s and 1960s. The last Southern Railway train, the Crescent, left in 1970 when that train was rerouted north through Birmingham. The Pan American ended in 1971 when the L&N yielded passenger operations to Amtrak. When Amtrak came into existence in 1971, it continued passenger service through Montgomery with a single train (the South Wind, later renamed the Floridian), operating between Chicago and Miami. However, this train was terminated in 1979 and Union Station was closed.

After a period of disuse, Union Station was renovated for commercial tenants. The train shed still stands, although tracks under it have been replaced by asphalt parking. It was declared a National Historic Landmark in 1976, for its importance in the state's railroad transportation history, and for the train shed, a rare surviving example of a 19th-century gable-roofed shed (most of which were later replaced by balloon sheds).

Amtrak returned to Montgomery in 1989 with an extension of the Crescent called the Gulf Breeze from Birmingham to Mobile, but Union Station was not used. Instead, Amtrak contracted with a travel agent who occupied a former grain silo nearby. This Amtrak service was terminated in 1995, and Montgomery has had no passenger rail service since.

Among other tenants, Union Station hosted the Montgomery Area Visitor Center, until it moved to its current location at 1 Court Square.

== Gallery ==
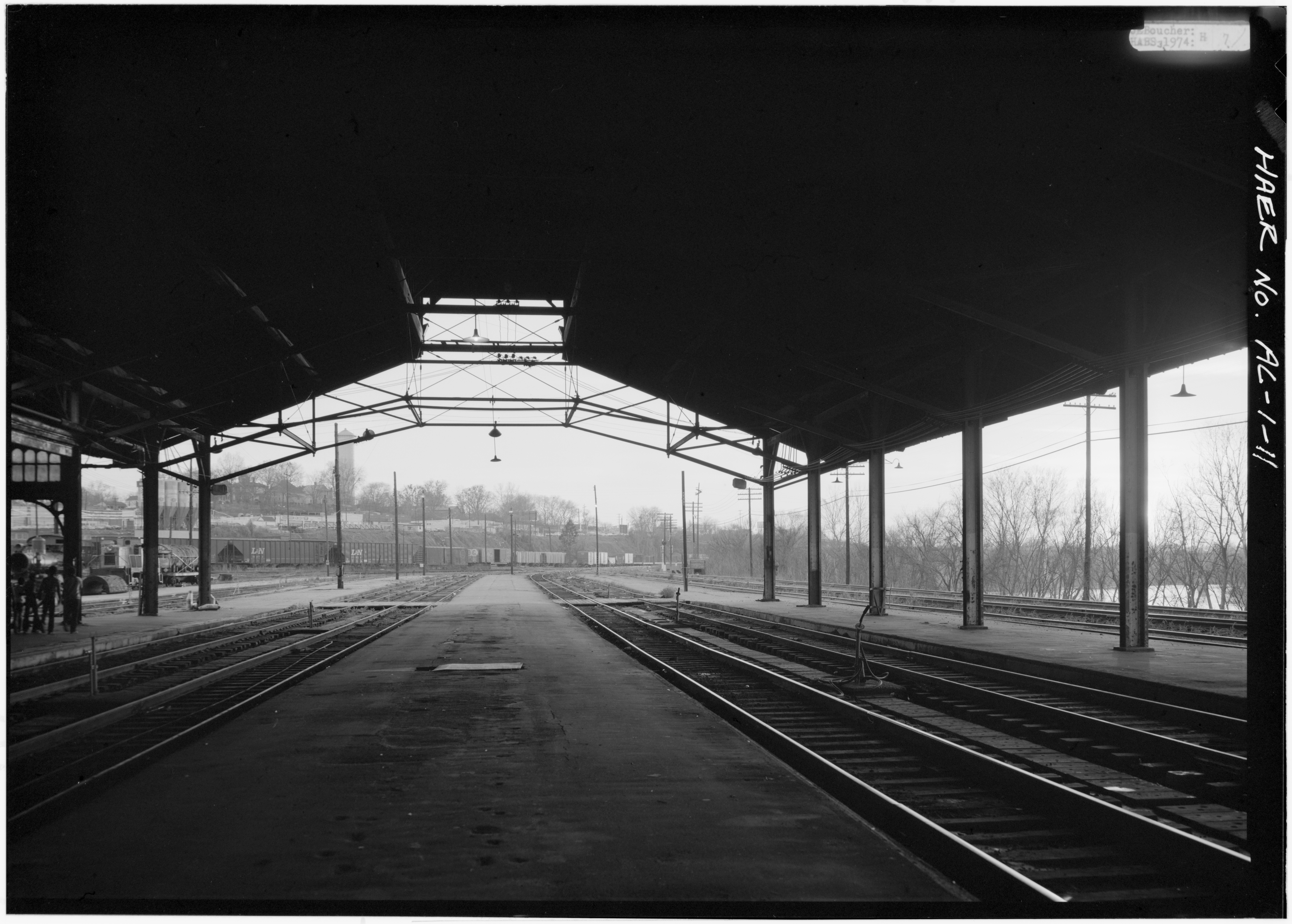
Looking West, Louisville and Nashville Railroad, Union Station Train Shed

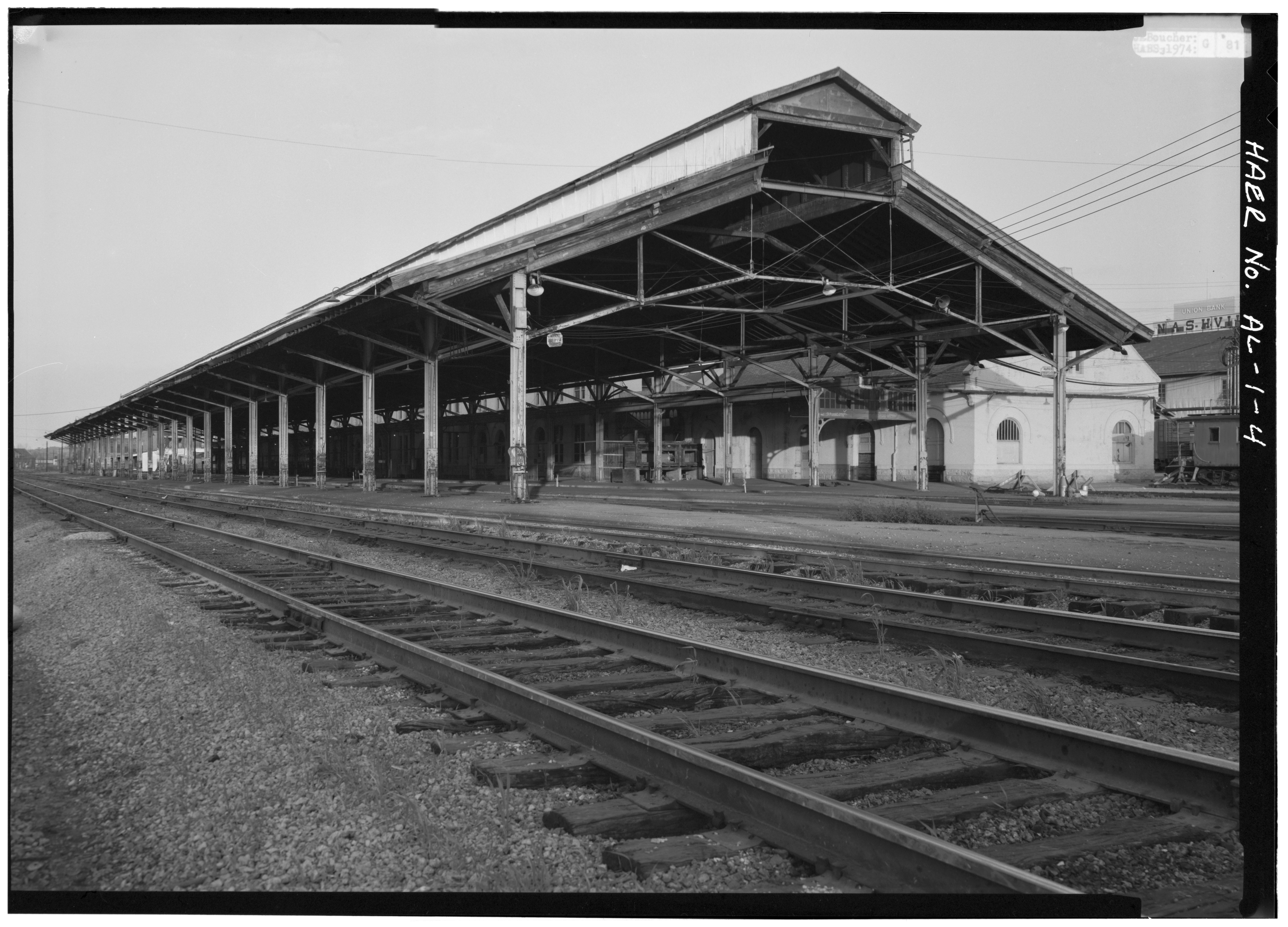
Union Station Train Shed, 1974

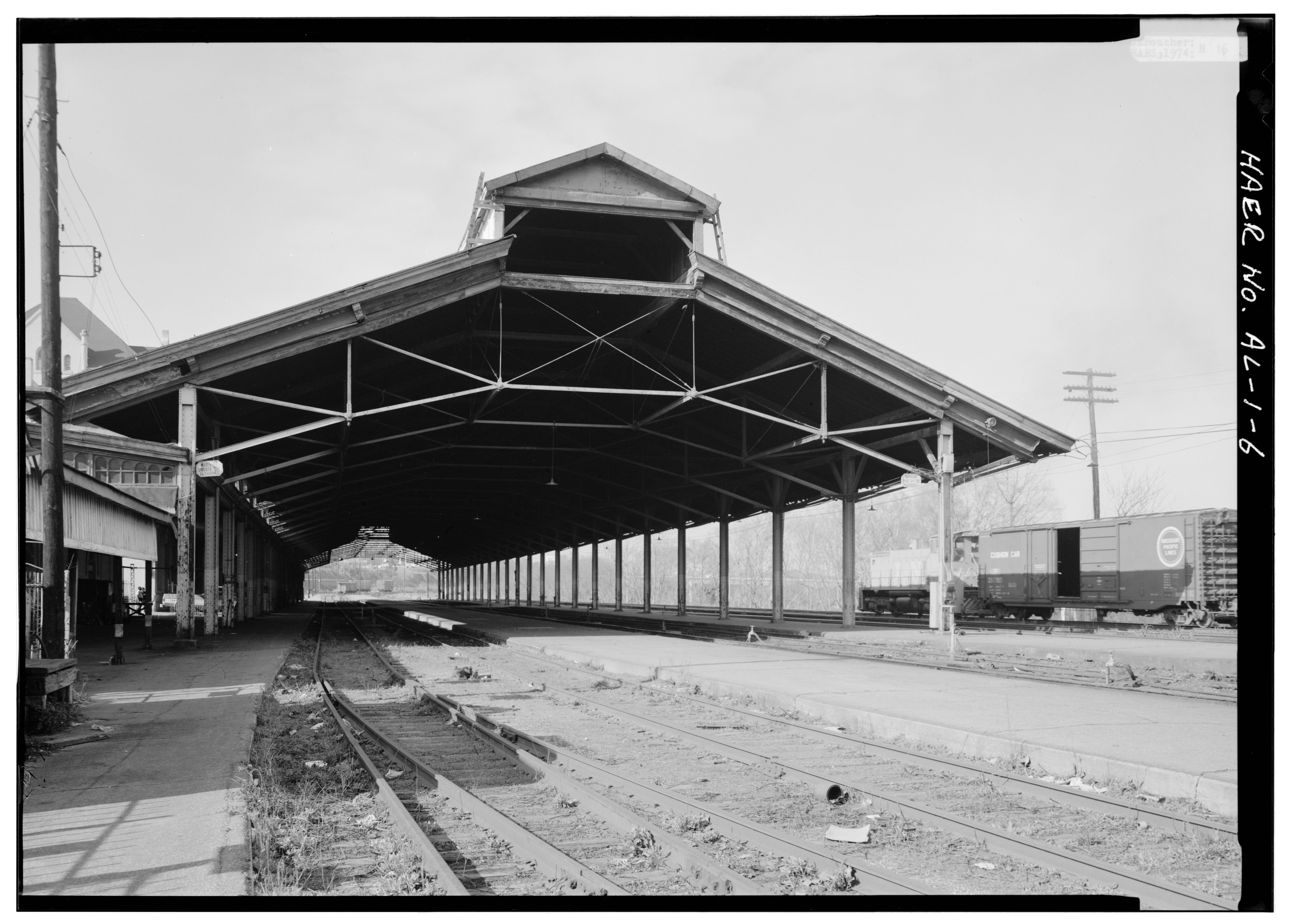
Union Station Train Shed, 1974

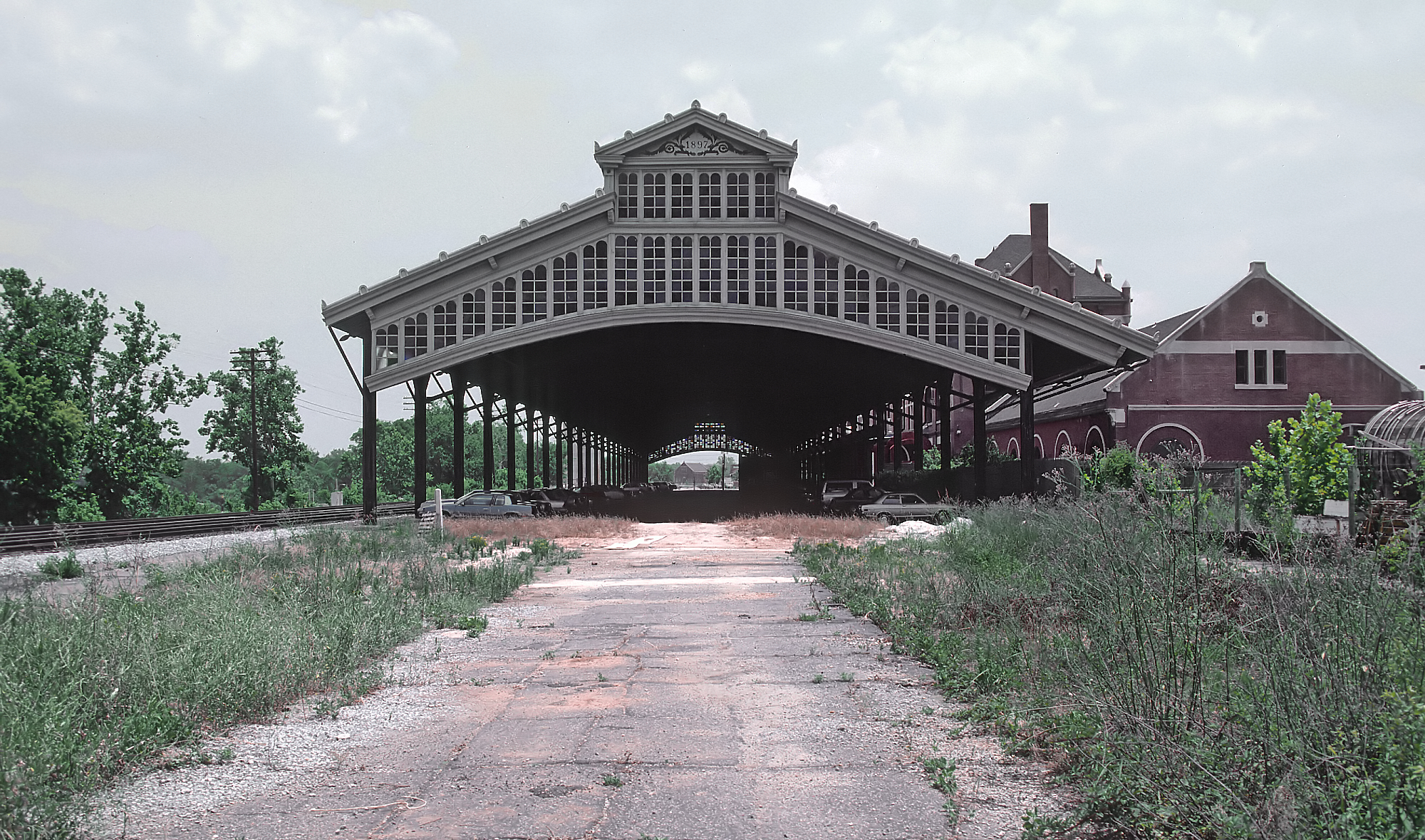
Union Station Train Shed, 1987

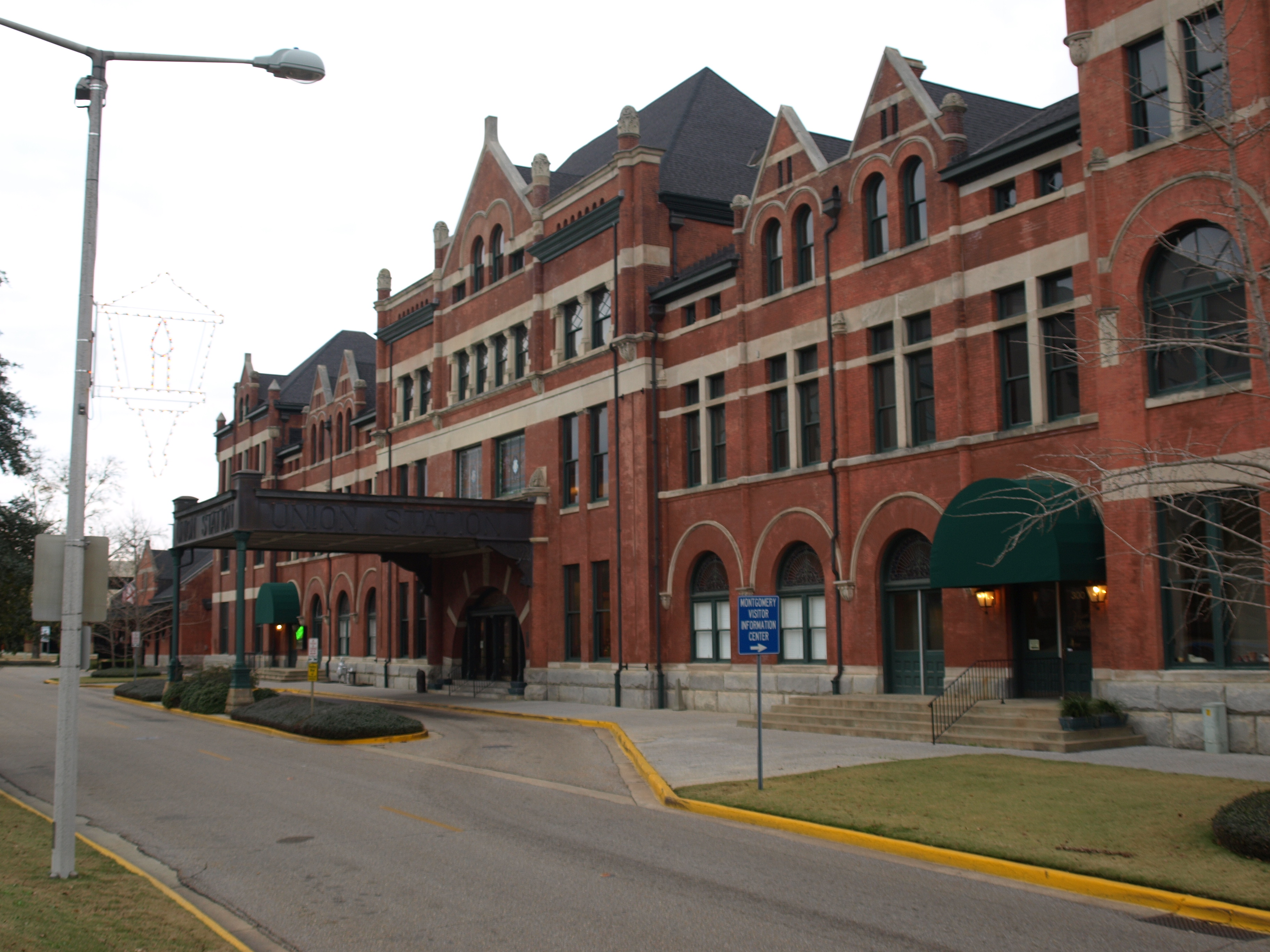
Union Station in 2008

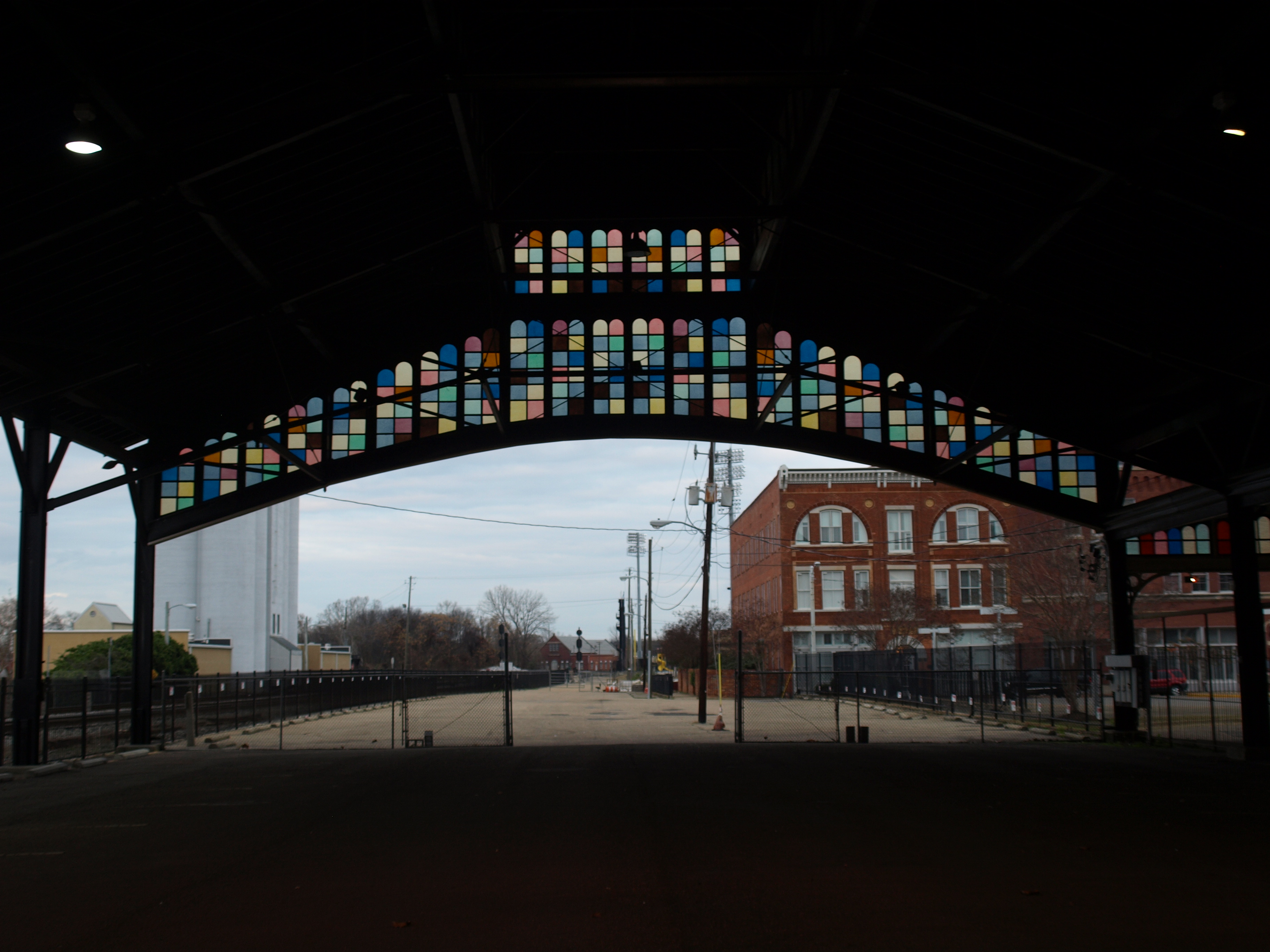
The interior of the train shed in 2008.

Aerial view of the station (2010)

== See also ==
- List of National Historic Landmarks in Alabama
