= Pensacola station (Louisville and Nashville Railroad) =

- Louisville and Nashville Passenger Station and Express Building
- U.S. National Register of Historic Places
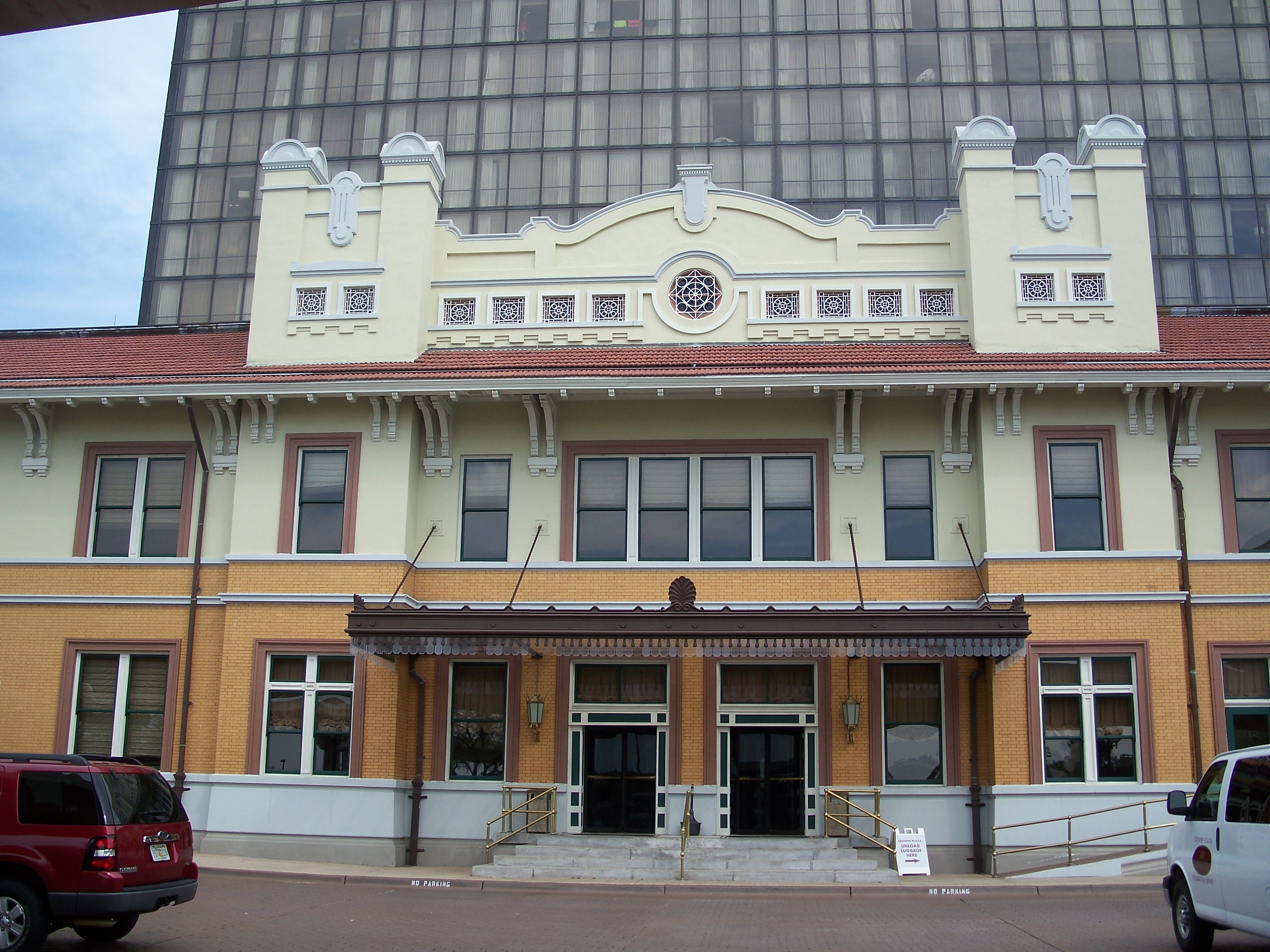
- The depot in 2008.

- Location within Florida Location within the United States
- Location: 239 N. Alcaniz St., Pensacola, Florida
- Coordinates: 30°25′2″N 87°12′36″W
- Area: 3.3 acres (1.3 ha)
- Architect: Louisville & Nashville Railroad Co.
- Architectural style: Spanish Mission and Italianate elements, Prairie School
- NRHP reference No.: 79000670
- Added to NRHP: June 11, 1979

The Louisville and Nashville Passenger Station and Express Building is a historic Louisville and Nashville Railroad passenger train depot in Pensacola, Florida.

== History ==
It is located at 239 North Alcaniz Street.

The building was constructed between 1912 and 1913 with elements of Prairie School, Spanish Mission, and Italianate architectural styles.

On June 11, 1979, it was added to the U.S. National Register of Historic Places.

In 1984, the depot was refurbished and incorporated into the Pensacola Grand Hotel (now the Crowne Plaza Pensacola Grand Hotel) that was built just behind it. The renovation of the depot was a painstaking process that used as much of the original material as possible. The building houses the lobby, shops, restaurant and meeting rooms of the hotel. The hotel has hosted two Presidents of the United States, including President Barack Obama in 2010.

== Specific use for passenger trains ==
Until 1971 the Louisville and Nashville Railroad operated the Gulf Wind (New Orleans - Mobile - Jacksonville).

== See also ==
- Pensacola (Amtrak station)

Preceding station	Louisville and Nashville Railroad	Following station
Goulding toward Myrtlewood	Myrtlewood – Chattahoochee	Bohemia toward Chattahoochee
