= Birmingham station (Alabama) =

Amtrak station in Birmingham, Alabama, United States

Birmingham, AL
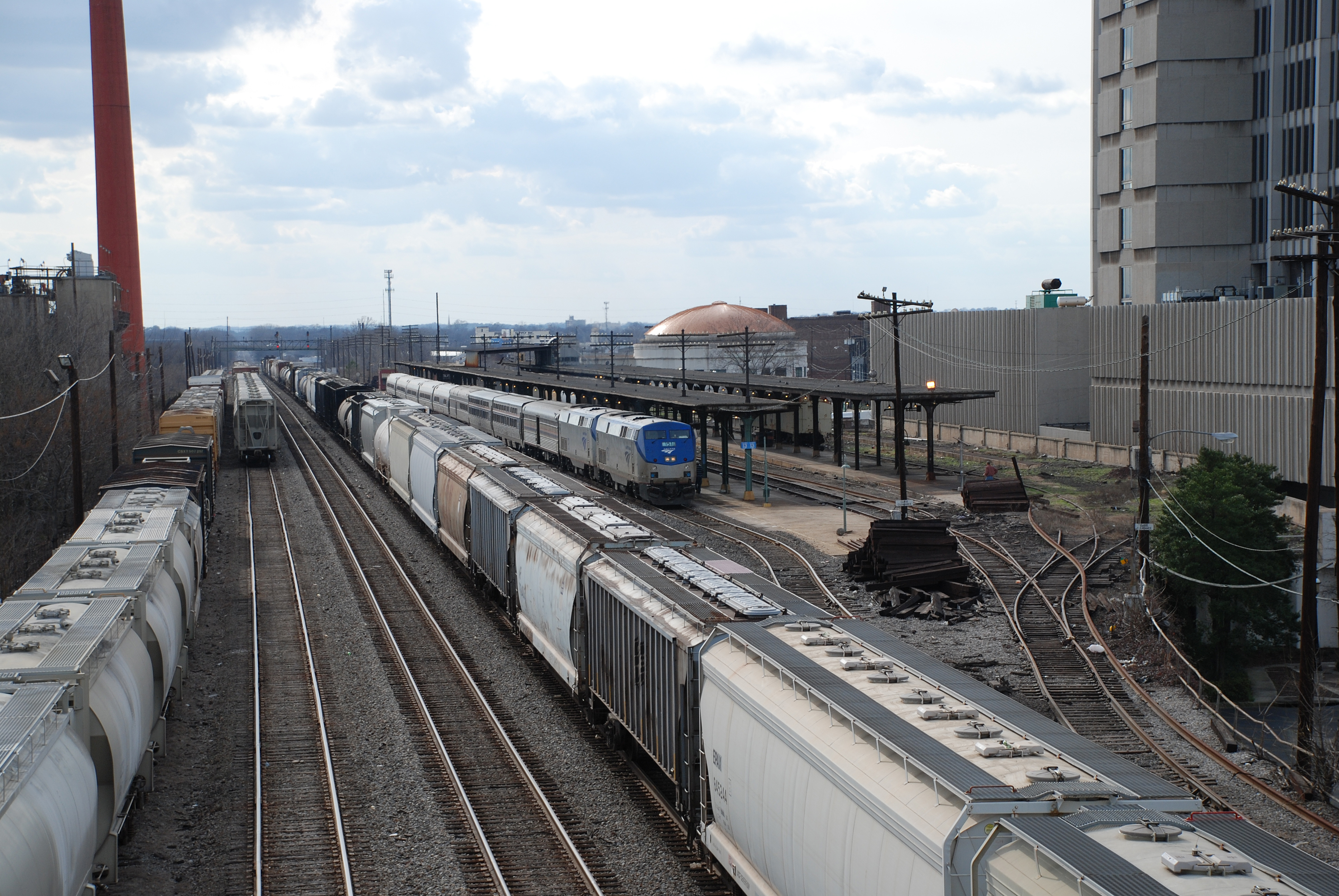
- The Amtrak Crescent train at Birmingham station in February 2009

General information
- Location: 1819 Morris Avenue; Birmingham, Alabama; United States
- Coordinates: 33°30′44″N 86°48′26″W
- Owner: CSX Transportation
- Line: CSX Boyles Terminal Subdivision
- Platforms: 2 island platforms, 1 in use
- Tracks: 2

Construction
- Parking: More than 100 long term spaces in a nearby City of Birmingham lot
- Accessible: Yes

Other information
- Station code: Amtrak: BHM

History
- Opened: 2017
- Original company: Louisville and Nashville Railroad

Passengers
- FY 2025: 39,492 (Amtrak)

Services
Preceding station	Amtrak	Following station
Tuscaloosa toward New Orleans	Crescent	Anniston toward New York
Former services
Preceding station	Amtrak	Following station
Montgomery toward St. Petersburg or Miami	Floridian	Decatur toward Chicago
Montgomery toward Mobile	Gulf Breeze	Terminus
Location

Birmingham station is a train station in Birmingham, Alabama. It is a service stop for Amtrak's Crescent, which provides daily service between New York City, Atlanta, and New Orleans. The current station is located on the site of another station originally built by the Louisville and Nashville Railroad in 1960, although Amtrak did not use the building itself, which was torn down in the 2000s.

== History ==
The L&N built the new station for $500,000, replacing Union Station which it had used since 1887. Union Station was also served by the Atlanta, Birmingham and Coast Railroad until the 1930s. One writer described this new station as "modern in every respect."

=== Passenger services in L&N years ===
Through the 1960s, these long distance Louisville & Nashville trains served the Birmingham station:

- Humming Bird (Cincinnati - New Orleans)
- Pan-American (Cincinnati - New Orleans)
- South Wind (Chicago - St. Petersburg and Miami)

=== Since 1971 ===
When Amtrak assumed control of most inter-city passenger service on May 1, 1971, its Floridian continued to use the L&N station. The Southern Railway, which had declined to join Amtrak, continued to use its own station several blocks to the northeast. On February 1, 1979, the Southern Railway conveyed its passenger service to Amtrak and the Southern Crescent (shortened to Crescent) began serving the ex-L&N station as well. Amtrak discontinued the Floridian in October 1979 but the Crescent has operated uninterrupted ever since. Between 1989 and 1995 Alabama funded a Mobile, Alabama section of the Crescent named the Gulf Breeze.

The Birmingham Intermodal Facility, which opened in 2017, combines several modes of ground transportation in one central location: the MAX bus central station, Greyhound bus service, Megabus service, Amtrak passenger rail and the city's Zyp bike program. The $32 million facility also includes a Birmingham Police substation, a food service area, a retail space and the Birmingham-Jefferson County Transit Authority's corporate offices.

== See also ==
- Birmingham Terminal Station – a separate passenger station in use from 1909 until it was demolished in 1969.
