= Union Station (Houston) =

Historic building in Houston, Texas, U.S.

- U.S. National Register of Historic Places
- Texas State Antiquities Landmark
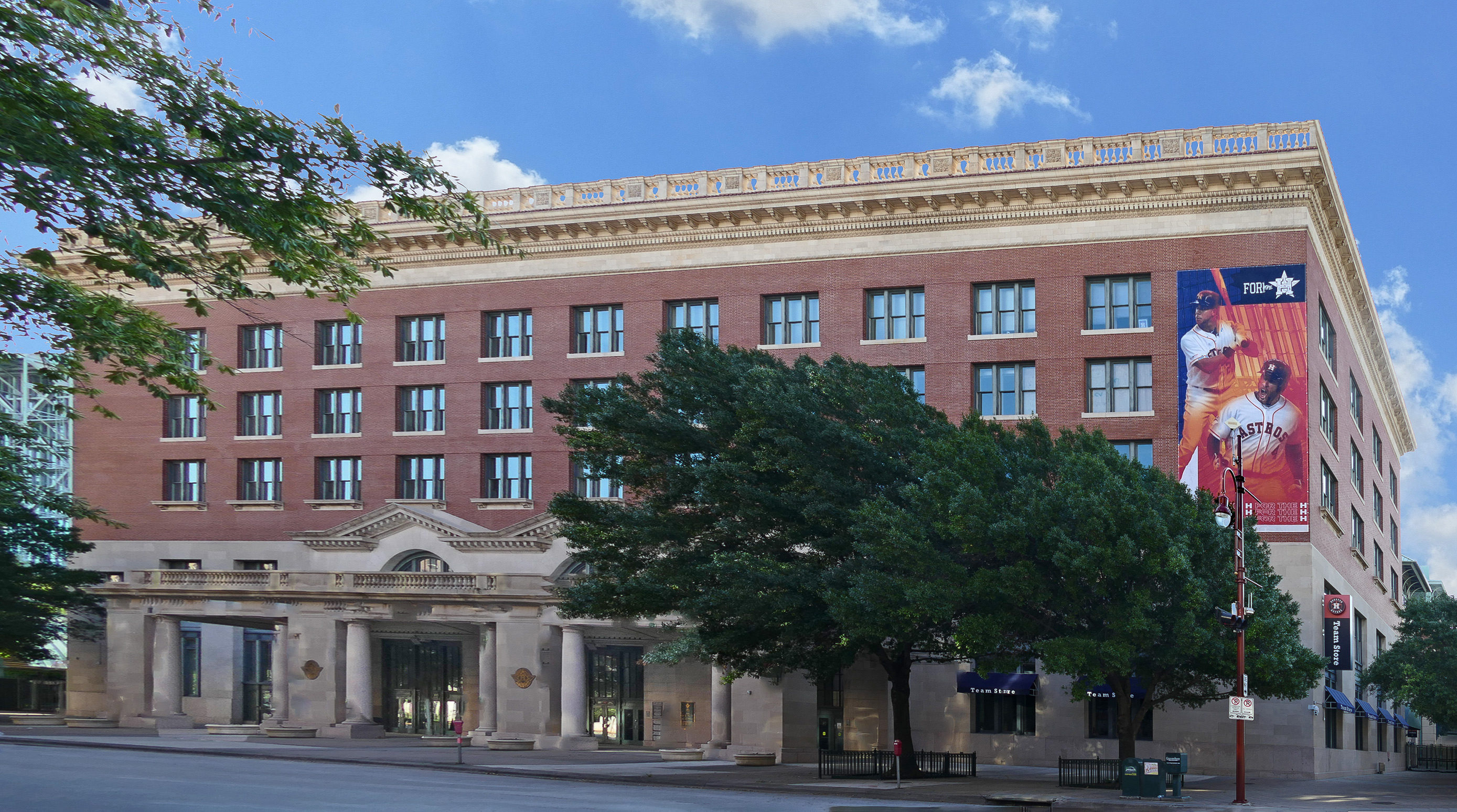
- The building in 2020

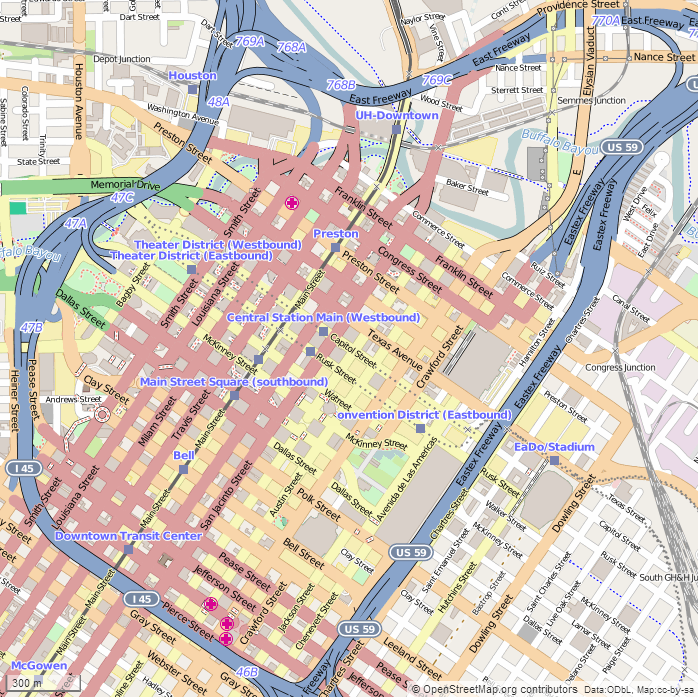
- Location within Houston Downtown Location within Texas Location within the United States
- Location: 501 Crawford St., Houston, Texas
- Coordinates: 29°45′25″N 95°21′23″W
- Area: 1 acre (0.40 ha)
- Built: 1911
- Architect: Warren & Wetmore
- Architectural style: Classical Revival
- NRHP reference No.: 77001448
- TSAL No.: 337

Significant dates
- Added to NRHP: November 10, 1977
- Designated TSAL: 5/28/1981

Union Station is a building in Houston, Texas, in the United States. Dedicated on March 2, 1911, and formerly a hub of rail transportation, the building now serves as a cornerstone for Daikin Park. It is listed on the National Register of Historic Places, and has since been superseded by Houston's Amtrak station.

== History ==
=== Construction and rail use ===
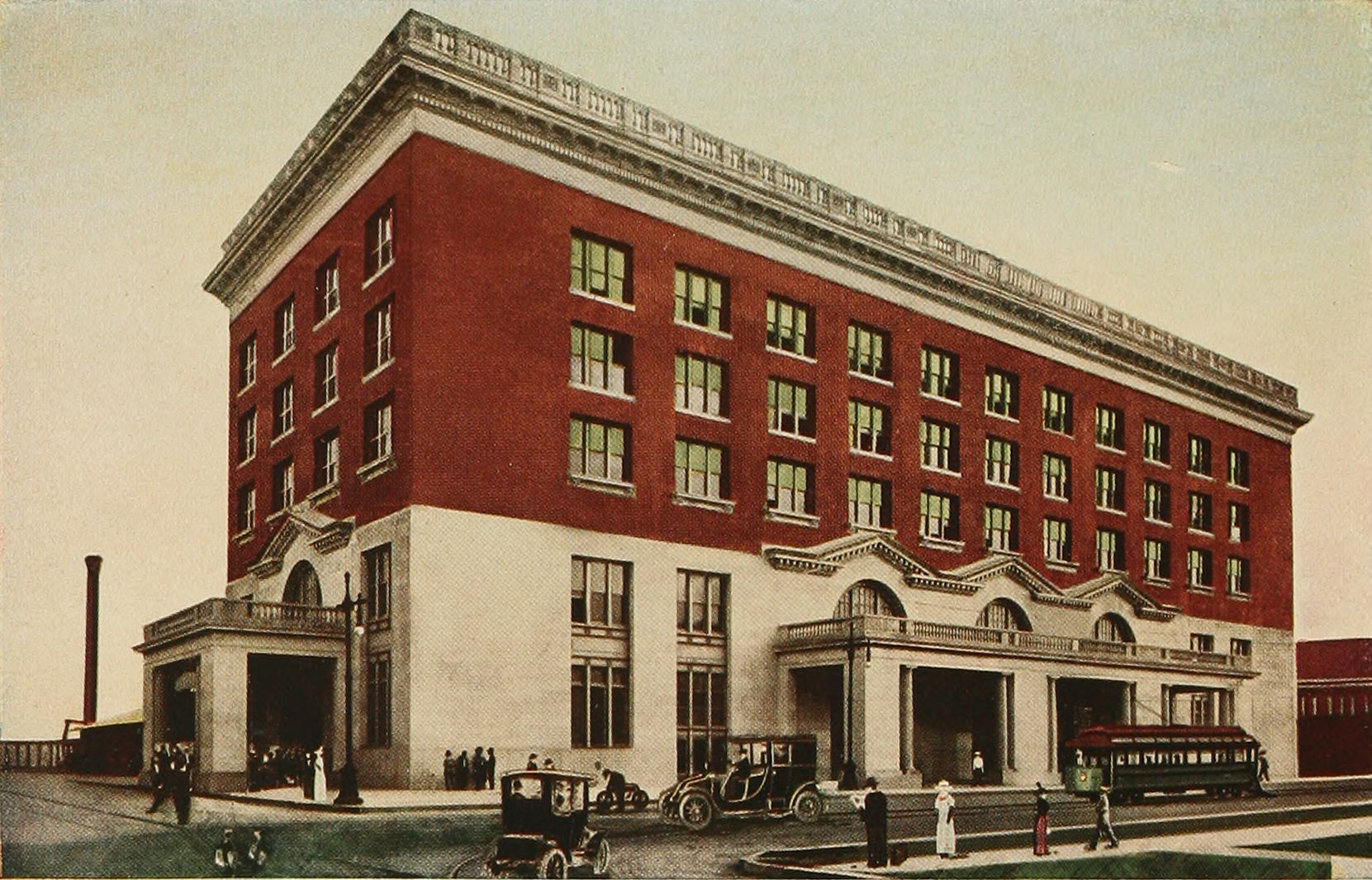
An illustration of Union Station, 1913

In 1909 the Houston Belt and Terminal Railway Company commissioned the design of a new union station for Houston from New York City-based architects Warren and Wetmore. The location called for the demolition of several structures of Houston prominence. Horace Baldwin Rice's residence and Adath Yeshurun Congregation's synagogue among other structures were removed.

With an original estimated cost of US$1 million, Union Station was constructed by the American Construction Company for an eventual total of five times that amount. Exterior walls were constructed of granite, limestone, and terracotta, while the interior used an extensive amount of marble. It was completed and opened on March 1, 1911. At the time, Houston, with seventeen railways, was considered the main railroad hub of the Southern United States. This is also evident by the Seal of Houston, which prominently features a locomotive. Two more floors were added the following year.

==== Railroads and destinations ====
The station served as the main inter-city passenger terminal for Houston for over seven decades thereafter.

Major railroad lines served:

- Burlington Northern
  - Texas Zephyr to Dallas and Denver
- Chicago, Rock Island and Pacific Railroad
  - Twin Star Rocket, to Minneapolis, via Dallas, Fort Worth, Kansas City and Des Moines
- Missouri Pacific
  - Texas Eagle, to St. Louis; Houstonian and Orleanian to Beaumont, Baton Rouge and New Orleans; Pioneer and Valley Eagle to Brownsville and Corpus Christi, Texas
- Santa Fe; unnamed train to Memphis, Tennessee
  - Texas Chief to Chicago, and service from Houston to Clovis, New Mexico and Temple, Texas (for Santa Fe trains to Richmond and Los Angeles, California and Chicago)

The Southern Pacific Railroad maintained its own station approximately one mile from Union Station. The Missouri-Kansas-Texas Railroad also maintained its own station about 0.8 miles from Union Station.

Preceding station	Atchison, Topeka and Santa Fe Railway	Following station
Terminus	Houston – Galveston	Mykawa toward Galveston
Preceding station	Burlington-Rock Island Railroad	Following station
Tomball toward Teague	Teague – Houston	Terminus
Preceding station	Missouri Pacific Railroad	Following station
League City toward Galveston	Galveston – Longview	Aldine toward Longview
Terminus	Houston – New Orleans	Magnolia Park toward New Orleans

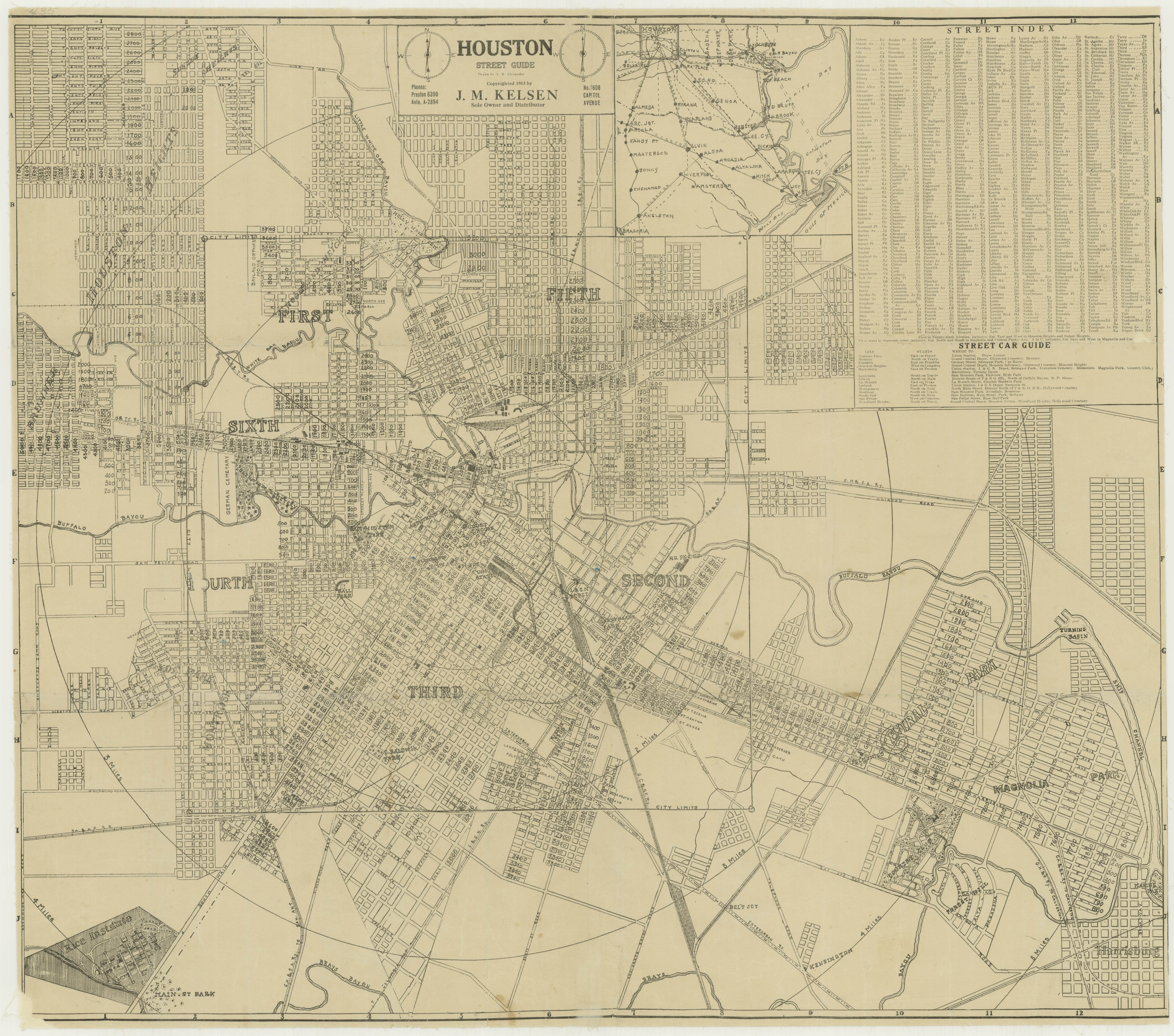
Section of a map of Houston from 1913, showing the location of the station and yards, the eventual ballpark site. (Select the image to view the full map.)

==== Decline ====
Passenger rail declined greatly after World War II. When Amtrak took over most intercity rail service in 1971, Union Station was one of two stations used by the new company, the other being the new Southern Pacific station built in 1959 that served the Sunset Limited. However, it soon became apparent that Amtrak could not afford to maintain two stations in the area. The last regularly scheduled train that stopped at Union Station, the Lone Star (successor of the Texas Chief), was rerouted to the Southern Pacific station on July 31, 1974. With this move, the building effectively ceased to be a public facility and was taken over by the Houston Belt & Terminal and its parent railroads as office space and a dispatching center. One section of the building in the south end of the second floor was leased to the Houston Society of Model Engineers, which operated a large HO scale model railroad layout they named the "Texas, Crawford & Prairie RR", after the three streets which form the boundary of the original property of the station. On November 10, 1977, the building was named to the National Register of Historic Places.

=== Use in the 21st century ===
In 2005 Southern Pacific 2-10-2 982 was moved from Hermann Park to the corner of Texas Avenue and Avenidas de las Americas between the George R. Brown Convention Center and Union Station. In 2013 it was donated to the Nau Center for Texas Culture to be located in the Get Big Things Done gallery However, construction of the Center was halted in March 2015 due to "[s]kyrocketing construction costs and the challenge of raising $80 million within a short period..."

=== Ballpark era ===
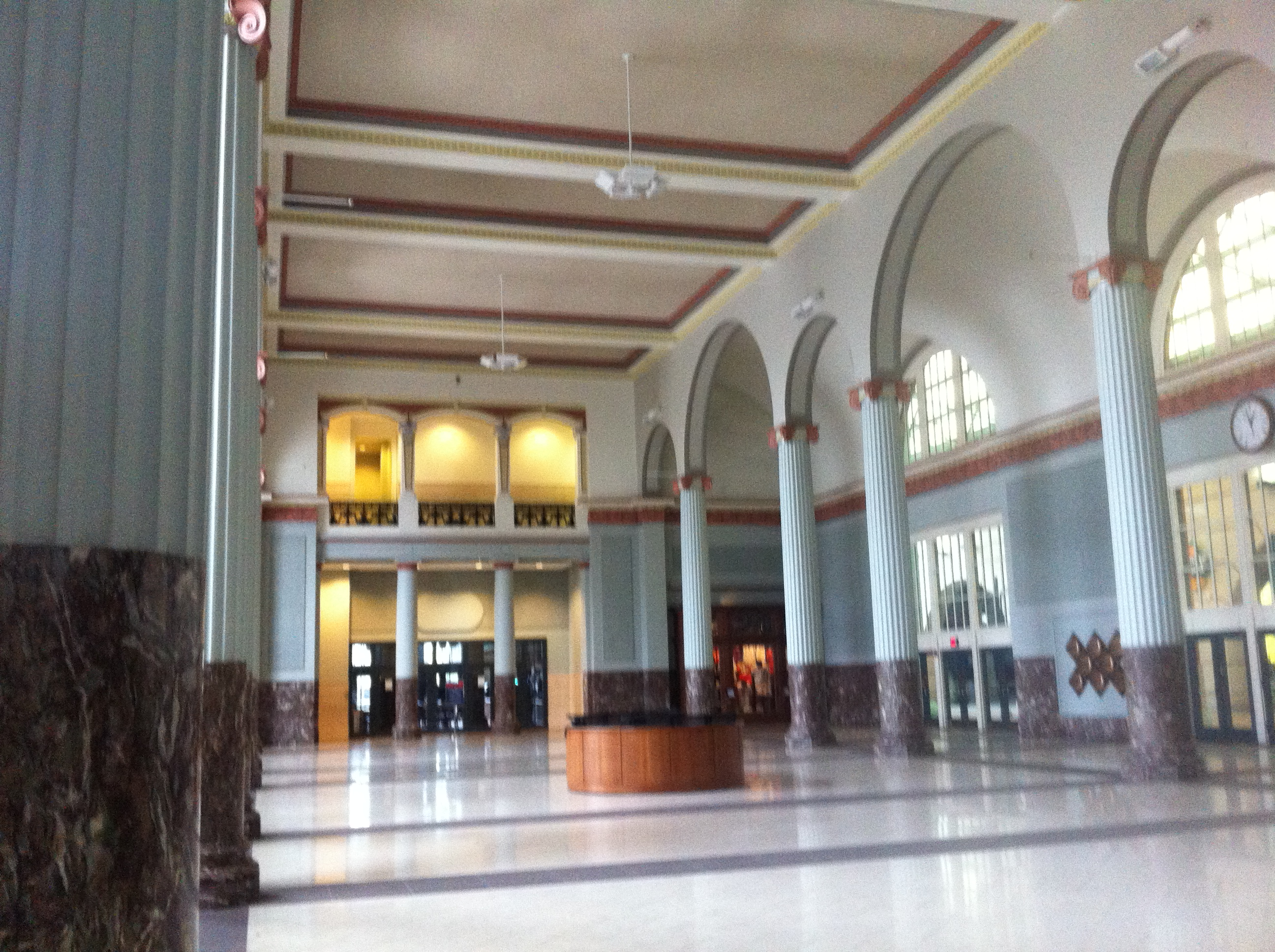
Union Station Lobby is the main entrance to Daikin Park, and the former concourse of Union Station

Plans for a new Houston ballpark to replace the Astrodome began in 1995, and originally called for a site to be used at the Astrodomain. In August 1996, Houston's Union Station received a US$2 million grant from the Texas Transportation Commission for renovation in a separate project. Plans for the new ballpark's location drastically changed by September mostly in response to Enron Chairman Kenneth Lay's input and pledge to substantially contribute to funding if placed downtown. It was at this time that the Union Station location was proposed by Lay.

Construction of Enron Field, now named Daikin Park, was completed thereafter with Union Station preserved and renovated as the ballpark's main lobby. It opened on April 7, 2000.

== See also ==
- National Register of Historic Places listings in Harris County, Texas
