= Golden State (train) =

Passenger train

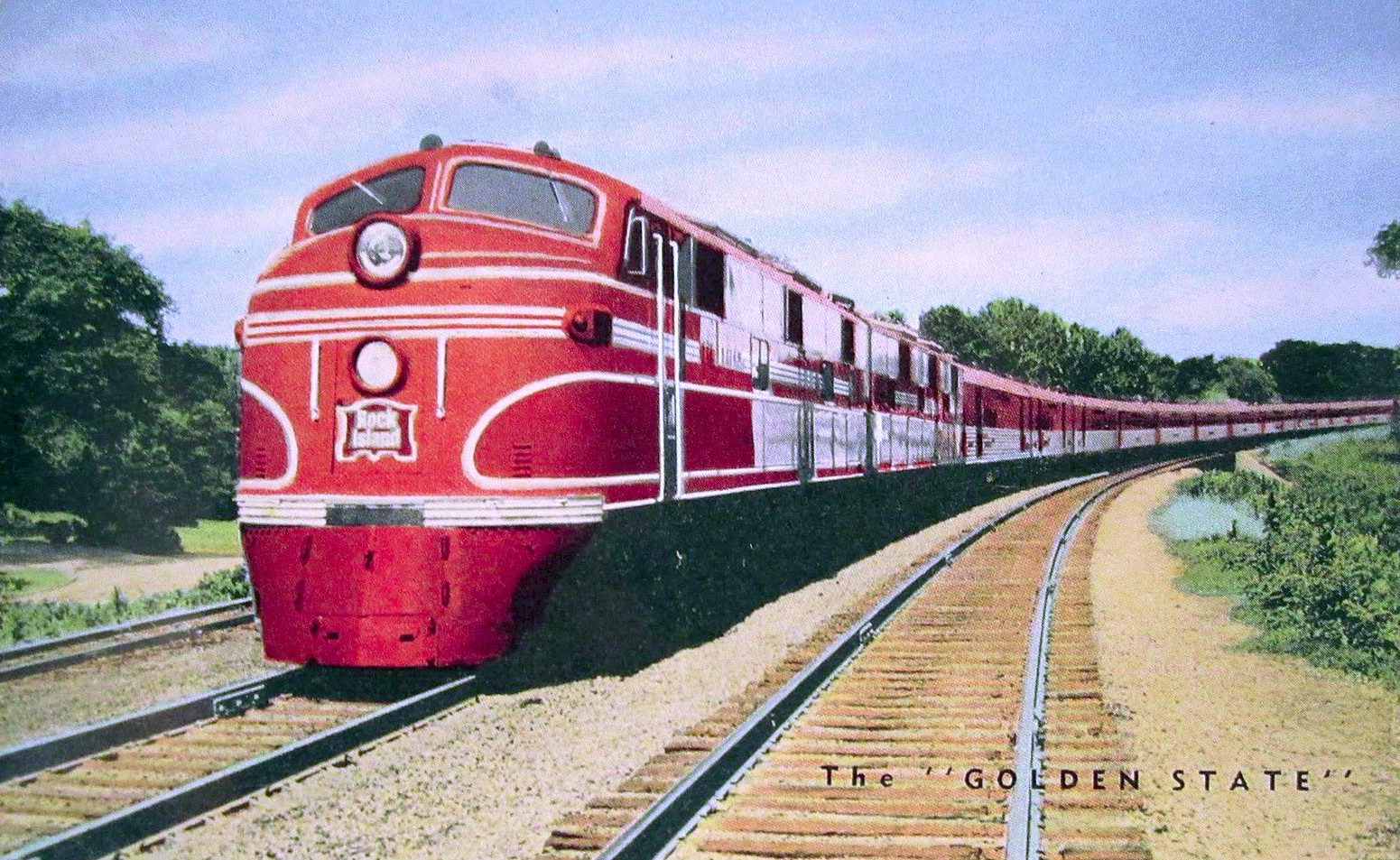
- Streamlined version of the train.

Overview
- Service type: Inter-city rail
- Status: Discontinued
- Locale: Midwestern United States/Southwestern United States
- First service: 1902
- Last service: 1968
- Former operators: Chicago, Rock Island and Pacific Railroad; Southern Pacific Company

Route
- Termini: Chicago, Illinois; Los Angeles, California
- Distance travelled: 2,340 miles (3,770 km)
- Service frequency: Daily
- Train numbers: 3 (westbound); 4 (eastbound)

On-board services
- Seating arrangements: Reclining seat coach
- Sleeping arrangements: Roomettes, double bedrooms, compartments, drawing rooms (1952)
- Catering facilities: Dining car
- Observation facilities: Lounge car

Technical
- Track gauge: 4 ft 8 1/2 in (1,435 mm)

The Golden State was a named passenger train between Chicago and Los Angeles from 1902–1968 on the Chicago, Rock Island and Pacific Railroad (“Rock Island”) and the Southern Pacific Company (SP) and predecessors. It was named for California, the “Golden State”.

The Golden State route was relatively low-altitude, crossing the Continental Divide at 4,564 feet (1,391 m) near Lordsburg, New Mexico, although the highest elevation en route was over 6,740 ft (2,050 m) near Corona, New Mexico. Other Chicago to Los Angeles passenger routes reached considerably higher elevations: 7,588 feet (2,313 m) on the Santa Fe Railway at the tunnel under Raton Pass in New Mexico, and 8,014 feet (2,443 m) on the Union Pacific at Sherman, Wyoming. At 2,340 miles, the Golden State route was one of the longest continuous passenger railroad routes in the United States, to be exceeded by the SP's Imperial and by Amtrak's pre-2005 Sunset Limited.

== History ==
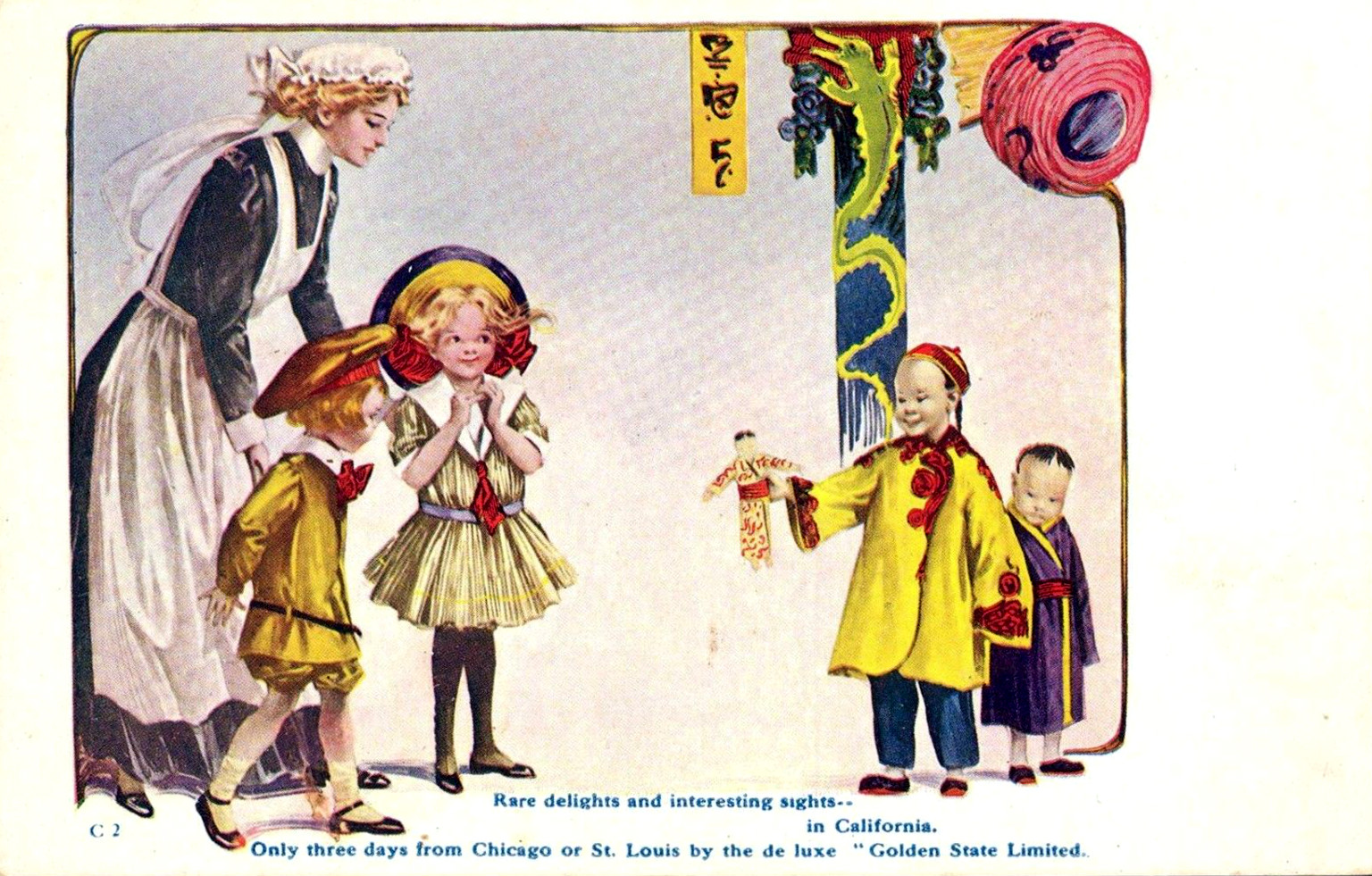
1909 postcard ad for the train.

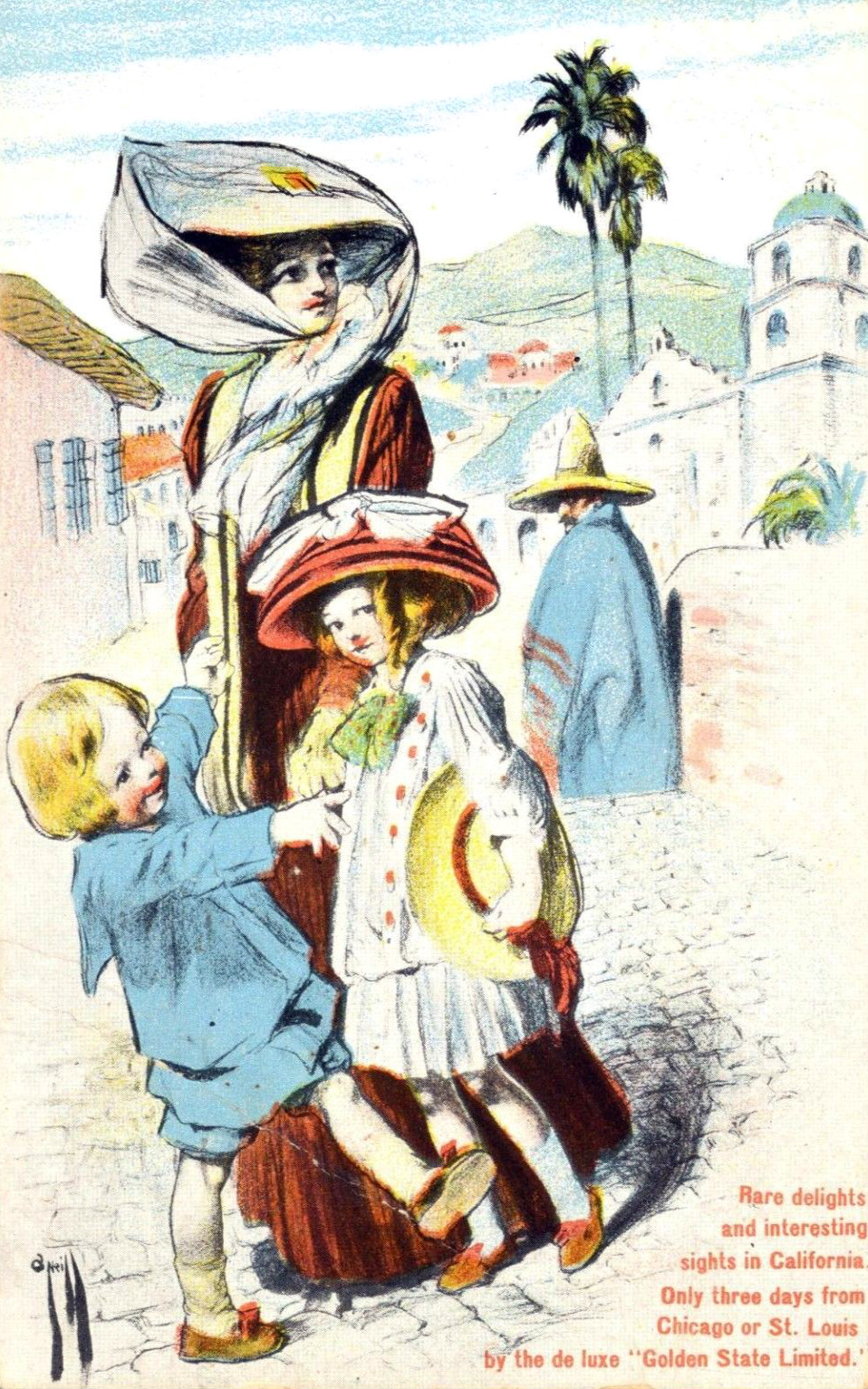
1911 postcard. The railroad hired American illustrator Rose O'Neill to produce some of its promotional material.

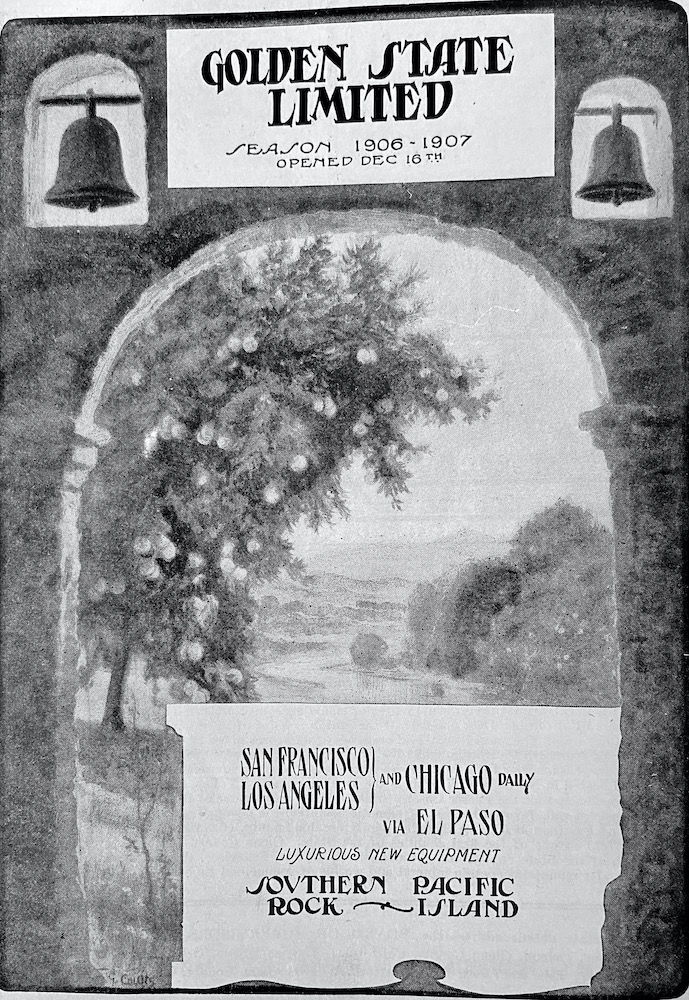
Promotional ad from 1907

The train was inaugurated on November 2, 1902, as the Golden State Limited between Chicago, Kansas City, El Paso, southern Arizona and Los Angeles. At 2,362 miles (3,801 km) it had the longest route in the United States and second only to the Canadian Pacific Railway's Imperial Limited in North America. Until 1910 the Golden State Limited was seasonal, generally running December to April or May; the rest of the year, the same schedules were known as the California Limited westbound and Chicago-St. Louis Limited eastbound. The Golden State Limited was for Pullman passengers only, while the California Limited also carried tourist (economy) sleeping cars and coaches. The Golden State Limited (or California Limited in the off season) carried numbers 43 and 44 until mid-1907 when it became numbers 3 and 4. After January 1910 the Golden State Limited ran year-round until it ended in 1968. Limited was dropped from the name on May 18, 1947, and the train became the Golden State.

In summer 1926, the train left Chicago at 8:30 PM CST and arrived Los Angeles 68 hr 15 min later. During the 1920s and 1930s when Florida became a popular winter destination, the Rock Island and Southern Pacific positioned the Golden State as an escape from the cold eastern and Midwestern winters, with some success.

For years the primary competition was Santa Fe's California Limited which did almost twice the business. When the Santa Fe Chief started in November 1926, the Golden State started running on the same 63-hour schedule with the same $10 extra fare (until 1929).

After World War II, the Rock Island and Southern Pacific considered a new 39¾ hour (the accepted fast schedule between Chicago and Los Angeles/San Francisco) streamliner to be named the Golden Rocket. This name was an extension of the use of the name Rocket that the Rock Island had introduced on other routes combined with the prefix “Golden” which had been used for many years as a prefix for car names. See also the Rocky Mountain Rocket, the Des Moines Rocket, the Peoria Rocket and others.

The Golden Rocket was to have two sets of equipment (one supplied by each railroad) and compete with Santa Fe's Super Chief, another train between Chicago and Los Angeles. The Rock Island ordered cars with a red and silver color scheme, lettered for the Golden Rocket. The Southern Pacific was not as enthusiastic, primarily because of upgrades needed on the El Paso–Kansas City portion of the route, which was single track and poorly signaled. After Southern Pacific decided not to participate, Rock Island's set of Golden Rocket equipment was re-lettered and integrated into the Golden State.

The Golden State became a streamliner in January 1948, with vermilion red on the upper body and pier panel and the lower bodies either natural corrugated stainless steel or silver or grey paint on smooth-sided cars. The train ran with many styles of equipment. Smooth-sided and corrugated stainless steel equipment were mixed and heavyweight baggage, Railway Post Office (RPO) and dormitory cars were common.

Transcontinental sleeping car service between New York and Los Angeles on alternate days via the New York Central Railroad and Pennsylvania Railroad was added in 1946 but ended in 1951. Other sleeping car routes on the Golden State included Chicago – Kansas City and Chicago – San Diego (via the Southern Pacific and their subsidiary, San Diego and Arizona Railway, connecting at Yuma, Arizona). The train carried linked sleeping cars from other carriers: in Kansas City, it picked up a Rock Island Railroad sleeping car from Minneapolis and at the same station it picked up also a Missouri Pacific Railroad sleeping car from St. Louis,

The train had a coordinated connection with the National Railway of Mexico's (NdeM) El Fronterizo (7/8) in El Paso, Texas; this NdeM train continued to Ciudad Juarez, Chihuahua and Mexico City. The schedule was set to accommodate travel from Los Angeles to Mexico, and the reverse direction.

The Golden State had the same declining passenger revenues as other trains in the 1950s and 1960s, although service was not downgraded severely as on other trains. A sleeping car and grill/lounge or dining car was always included. The train was combined with Southern Pacific's New Orleans to Los Angeles Sunset Limited west of El Paso after April 1964. The final Golden State ran on April 8, 1968, after which service ceased.

Amtrak's Sunset Limited between Los Angeles and New Orleans uses the Golden State's route west of Yuma. The Sunset runs three times weekly; Southern Pacific reduced the Sunset Limited from daily to tri-weekly before Amtrak's formation.

== Routes ==
The Southern Pacific line from Los Angeles to El Paso was completed in May 1881; the Golden State ran on the El Paso and Northeastern Railroad from Tucumcari, New Mexico, to El Paso. West of there it sometimes used the El Paso and Southwestern Railroad (EP&SW) through Douglas, Arizona, to Tucson and sometimes the Southern Pacific (SP) via Deming; SP carried the train Tucson to Los Angeles. The former EP&SW between Douglas and El Paso was abandoned in 1961 and the tracks removed in 1963.

Rock Island had many feeder lines used for freight and passenger service to southern California. One of these was the ‘Choctaw Route’ from Memphis through Little Rock, Oklahoma City and Amarillo to Tucumcari, New Mexico. This line was completed in 1900 to Amarillo, Texas, and to Tucumcari, after purchase by the Rock Island, by 1902. Over the years connections were made with through sleeping cars from Memphis and Little Rock to Los Angeles, generally connecting with the Golden State. The Rock Island actually owned the rail line to Santa Rosa, New Mexico, 59 miles (95 km) south of Tucumcari, but since the routes intersected at Tucumcari, this is where the change from Rock Island to Southern Pacific crews and locomotives were made.

The Rock Island main line crossed the Colorado and Southern and Fort Worth and Denver railroad main line at Dalhart, Texas. This Dallas–Denver line was the route of the Texas Zephyr and other trains. For many years travelers could connect here to go north and south between El Paso and Denver, the only other route being the Santa Fe to Albuquerque with a second change of trains at La Junta, Colorado.

As part of the merger agreement between EP&SW and SP in 1924, the SP agreed to build a main line through Phoenix, which until then was on a branch from Maricopa. The main line was built from a point near Picacho through Coolidge to Chandler, Mesa, Tempe and Phoenix thence on existing tracks to Buckeye with a new extension to Wellton on the original SP main. This alternate route is no longer in service between Roll and Buckeye, Arizona, although the tracks are in place.

== Equipment ==
The Golden State received regular upgrades to equipment. Beginning in 1924 Golden-series observation cars were assigned to the train. These 3-compartment, 2-drawing room observations became famous in the Pullman fleet as the most modern and luxurious equipment available and were also operated on the Santa Fe (Silver series) and New York Central (Central series).

Starting in 1940, 8-section, 5-double bedroom rebuilt heavyweight Clover-series cars appeared on the Golden State.

During 1926-29 and after 1948 the Golden State was an extra-fare train, supposedly to account for the costs of the luxury service and the reservation system for chair car seating. In later years, the extra fare became something of a joke as service deteriorated badly. Extra fare for Pullman accommodation Los Angeles to Chicago was $10 in 1948, adding perhaps 10% to the total fare. The $3.50 extra fare for chair car passengers had the advantage of individual reserved seats and modern, leg rest, air-conditioned coaches. If you did not want to pay the extra fare, the slower secondary trains (see below) were available. The additional costs in a non-computer era for coach seat reservations were substantial; however, a nationwide reservation system for Pullman (sleeping car) passengers had existed for many decades.

Shortly before World War II, three streamlined dining cars (Yucca, Saguaro and Ocotillo) were built by Budd for service on the train. These cars were placed on the Twin Star Rocket in 1945 and later returned to the Golden State.

Two-tone grey, smooth-sided 4-4-2 (4 double bedroom, 4-compartment, 2-drawing room) and 6-6-4 (6 sections, 6 roomettes, 4 double bedrooms) lightweight sleeping cars were assigned to the train beginning in 1942. Later that year 4-4-2 sleepers from the discontinued Arizona Limited and Treasure Island Special were also assigned (Imperial Clipper, Imperial Guard, Imperial Throne and Imperial Banner). These cars wore only numbers as the RI/SP did not name their cars until after World War II (and then only for a short time).

Streamlined 44 and 48 reclining seat leg-rest (long-distance) low-capacity chair cars from both the Southern Pacific and Rock Island were added to the Golden State as they were built.

Southern Pacific used “Roman”-style lettering on its equipment, while the Rock Island favored “Zephyr”-style lettering. Except for the 1942 built sleeping cars, the postwar cars built for the Golden State also differed in their car side style between the two roads: Except for two corrugated side coaches, Southern Pacific cars had smooth sides, while Rock Island cars had corrugated sides except for the Rock Island owned 4-4-2 and 6-6-4 sleepers. In the late 1950s the slower counterpart train on generally the same route was the Imperial.

Between 1947 and 1950, after the demise of the Golden Rocket, streamlined sleeping, chair, meal and lounge cars were added. As five consists were necessary, Rock Island and Southern Pacific each supplied two or three different cars. For example, Rock Island and Southern Pacific each built and assigned two 12 double bedroom sleeping cars for Golden State service, which resulted in four consists each featuring one such car type, while the fifth consist had a 4-4-2 sleeping car in place of the non existent fifth 12 double bedroom sleeping car. Unlike the Rock Island, the Southern Pacific had five 10-6 (10 roomette, 6 double bedroom) sleeping cars assigned to this train, where three cars of this type were normal mid train sleeping cars and two of this type were tail cars with a blunted end. The three normal mid train 10-6 sleeping cars usually ran in those three consists that did not feature a 10-6 blunt-end sleeping car at the rear but one of the three Rock Island round end observation cars.

As for mail cars, baggage cars and baggage dormitory cars, the situation was as follows: Both Southern Pacific and Rock Island each provided five mail-baggage cars (featuring a Railway Post Office) for Golden State service. The Southern Pacific assigned five older heavyweight mail-baggage cars numbered 5065-5069 which were painted in the new red and silver scheme. The Rock Island assigned three newly in 1947 built lightweight corrugated side mail-baggage cars numbered 802-804 and later in 1952 two newly rebuilt (from old parlor cars) heavyweight mail-baggage cars numbered 720 and 721. These three cars were the only cars of the entire Golden State car pool that never received the red and silver paint scheme and remained all stainless steel with Rock Island lettering in the letterboard instead of Golden State. Unlike for the mail-baggage cars where each road had provided five cars for, the situation for the baggage dormitory cars was different, as there were only five such cars in total assigned for Golden State service. The Rock Island provided three baggage dormitory cars: One lightweight corrugated side baggage dormitory numbered 820 built new by Pullman Standard in 1947 and two older heavyweight baggage dormitories numbered 6014 and 6105. The Southern Pacific provided modernized heavyweight baggage dormitory car 3401 which was built by American Car & Foundry as hospital car for the US Army in 1944 and was painted red and silver in 1947, and in 1949 a newly built lightweight smooth side baggage dormitory car numbered 3100. With only five baggage dormitory cars available for the five Golden State consists, the Rock Island soon painted heavyweight baggage dormitory 6013 into the red and silver scheme and assigned it as a protection car in case one of the five regularly assigned baggage dormitory cars were off for shopping. From 1948 until late 1950, the five Golden State consists had been always operating with two headend cars (one mail-baggage car and one baggage dormitory per consist). Only a consist that featured a combination of Southern Pacific baggage dormitory 3100 or Rock Island baggage dormitory 820 together with one of the three Rock Island mail-baggage cars 802-804 would be an entirely streamlined Golden State consist. All other options featured one or two heavyweight cars, which is why the Golden State could actually never be considered a full streamliner train. That possible combination of having at least one fully streamlined consist out of five was made impossible in late 1950 and early 1951 when the Southern Pacific started to assign four red and silver painted heavyweight ex baggage-horse cars now converted to mail-storage cars numbered 4300-4303. Rock Island also provided two 1947 built corrugated side baggage cars (numbers 852 and 853) as mail-storage cars during that time. So now the number of heavyweight cars in a Golden State consist could reach up to three. Only a consist which had either Rock Island baggage dormitory 820 or Southern Pacific baggage dormitory 3100 in combination with Rock Island mail-baggage cars 802-804 and Rock Island mail-storage cars 852-853 would be an all streamlined consist. It was not until 1959 that the number of heavyweight cars assigned to the Golden State consists would be reduced again.

In addition to the luxurious 2-double-bedroom, 1-drawing room observation La Mirada, built for the Golden Rocket, the Rock Island had observation cars Golden Vista and Golden Divan. All these three observation cars arrived in August 1948, which means by the time the Golden State was officially introduced as a streamliner in train in January 1948, all five consists continued operating without any observation cars until August that year and two consists even until June 1950. The Southern Pacific did not believe in observation cars, feeling them to be a nuisance to switch and non-revenue producing (mid-train lounge cars always made more money off beverage service). In June 1950 they supplied two blunt-end 10-6 (10 roomette, 6 double bedroom) sleeping cars, similar to the cars built in 1950 for the newly streamlined Sunset Limited. And instead of observation cars, SP supplied two full mid-train lounge cars named Golden View and Golden Outlook that arrived in late 1949. The two consists featuring the blunt-end 10-6 sleeping cars on the rear operated with the full mid-train lounge cars, while the three consists featuring observation cars operated without any full lounge car, as these observation cars themselves featured a buffet lounge in the rear half of the car. In May and June 1956, the Rock Island converted their three observation cars for the Golden State into full mid-train lounge cars, which caused three of the five consists to operate without any tail car, as the Rock Island did not have any blunt-end sleeping cars.

The five Golden State consists were remarkable in the point that they featured at least six unique cars that never were built in more than one example. These cars were Southern Pacific lightweight smooth side baggagage dormitory 3100, Rock Island lightweight corrugated side baggage dormitory 820, Rock Island lightweight corrugated side 4-4-2 sleeping car La Quinta, Rock Island lightweight corrugated side coffee shop lounge El Café (informally labeled as “Fiesta Car”), Rock Island lightweight corrugated side dining car El Comedor and Rock Island lightweight corrugated side sleeper buffet lounge observation La Mirada. Especially the unique and partially handmade decorations and interiors of El Café, El Comedor and La Mirada were heavily promoted in advertising but the chance that one of these unique cars was part of a Golden State consist was only one in five, which basically resulted in all five consists having unique compositions.

After World War II and until 1953 all cars in the train had names, mostly beginning with Golden. After 1953, when the red and silver paint scheme was discontinued, the names were gradually removed from the Southern Pacific cars and replaced by numbers. Also, the Golden State lettering in the letterboards of the Southern Pacific cars was replaced by Southern Pacific lettering written inside a red stripe and the train name was featured in a logo in the center of the car (like on the Sunset Limited). The Rock Island however retained the names and the Golden State lettered letterboards for their cars. The repainting process from the red and silver paint scheme to the all silver scheme for Rock Island cars and to the simulated stainless steel with red letterboard stripe scheme for Southern Pacific cars started in April 1953 and was not finished until January 1955. In late 1958, the Southern Pacific cars paint scheme was again changed by deleting the Golden State train name in the logo, by slightly enlargening the height of the red letterboard stripe and by painting the headend cars solid grey.

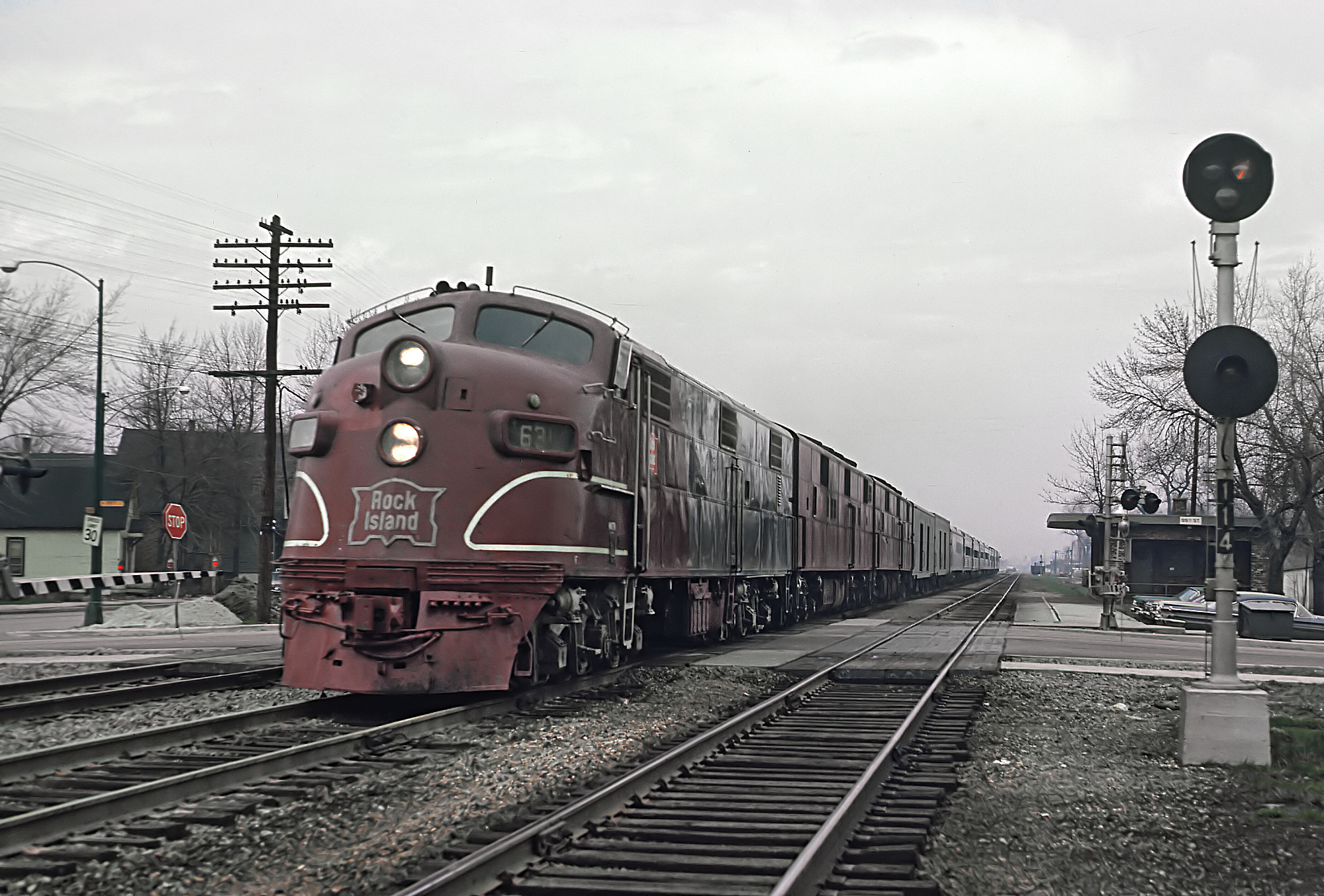
The Golden State at 99th Street in Washington Heights on the Rock Island mainline in April 1965

A unique type of sleeping car was introduced by Rock Island in 1954; 10 cars with eight roomettes and six bedrooms assigned to the Rocky Mountain Rocket and the Golden State. These cars had more space for long-distance travelers. Standard streamlined sleeping cars with roomettes normally held 22 passengers in various configurations (10-6, 14–4, etc.) but these, along with a “Western” series of 12 roomette, 4 double bedroom cars built for the Wabash and Union Pacific, were extra spacious. Also in 1954, Southern Pacific provided new 44-seat corrugated side coaches for the Golden State, which unlike the older smooth side coaches were built by Budd instead of Pullman Standard. In 1959, Rock Island purchased three lightweight smooth side baggage dormitory cars from the New York Central, which replaced the heavyweight baggage dormitory cars that the Rock Island had been constantly using for the Golden State since 1942. And also in 1959, Rock Island purchased two lightweight smooth side lounge cars from the New York Central for Golden State service, while it reassigned its original Golden State assigned lounge cars La Mirada, Golden Divan and Golden Vista to other trains.

Dieselization began on the Rock Island immediately post-war with A-B and A-B-B sets of EMD E6, E7, E8 and sometimes even Alco DL units being assigned to the train. Later, A-B-A sets and even some FP7 units became more common. In 1947 Southern Pacific bought three 6,000 hp (4.47 MW) A-B-B sets of EMD E7 units in the vermilion and silver (aluminum) colors. These red and silver Southern Pacific E7s were repainted to the familiar “Daylight” scheme (red, orange and black) in June 1949 before the Golden State even had received all its ordered lightweight cars which did not occur until June 1950. Until 1954, the Rock Island diesel units were painted in the original red, maroon and silver “Rocket” colors. In 1954 that changed to a simplified scheme without the red color, in 1958 to an even more simplified scheme featuring mostly a maroon front and silver rest and in the early 60's to an all maroon scheme, which by 1967 was enhanced with yellow wings at the front. By late 1953, Southern Pacific PA-1/PB-1 and PA-2/PB-2 units began joining the E7 units with pulling the Golden State, and in 1954 E9 units were added. By this time A-B-A sets became more common on the Southern Pacific, which could be either made up entirely of E7 or PA/PB units or mixed consists featuring E7, E9 and PA/PB units working together. All these Southern Pacific diesel units remained in the Daylight scheme until 1958 and 1959 when they were gradually repainted into the “Bloody Nose” scheme featuring a red nose and grey rest, which they kept until the very end. Also by 1960, F7 units started to appear pulling the Golden State for a limited time in the early '60s. Although the Golden State was officially declared a dieselized train by January 1948, the Southern Pacific regularly assigned GS-4 class 4-8-4 steam locomotives to pull the Golden State between Tucumcari, New Mexico and El Paso, Texas until late 1953. Due to diesel shortages on the Southern Pacific, which lasted until the mid '50s, steam helpers in form of GS class 4-8-4, MT class 4-8-2, SP class 4-10-2 and even AC class 4-8-8-2 and 2-8-8-4 steam locomotives were a common sight on the Golden State.

== Schedule ==
In July 1948 the Golden State left Chicago at 10:15 pm CST and arrived Los Angeles 5:15 pm on the second day. The return trip left Los Angeles at 11:30 am arriving in Chicago at 11:30 am the second morning. In July 1954 it left Chicago at 2:15 pm CST and arrived Los Angeles the second day at 7:30 am. The return trip left Los Angeles at 1:30 pm and arrived the second day at 9:55 am. In later years the arrival in Phoenix, for example, was late in the evening. Pullman passengers on the Phoenix setout could stay in the sleeping car until morning.

== Consist ==
A typical consist of the early 1950s could include a maximum of 16 cars:

1. Southern Pacific heavyweight mail-storage car 4300
2. Southern Pacific heavyweight mail-baggage car 5066
3. Rock Island lightweight corrugated side baggage dormitory 820 (lettered for Golden Rocket)
4. Southern Pacific lightweight corrugated side coach "Golden Sand"
5. Rock Island lightweight corrugated side coach "Golden Trumpet"
6. Rock Island lightweight corrugated side coffee shop lounge "El Café" (lettered for Golden Rocket)
7. Rock Island lightweight corrugated side coach "Golden Flute" [Minneapolis-Los Angeles]
8. Rock Island lightweight smooth side 6-6-4 sleeping car "Golden Plaza" [Minneapolis-Los Angeles]
9. Rock Island lightweight smooth side 6-6-4 sleeping car "Golden Mesa" [St. Louis-Los Angeles]
10. Rock Island lightweight corrugated side dining car "El Comedor" (lettered for Golden Rocket)
11. Southern Pacific lightweight smooth side 4-4-2 sleeping car "Golden Mission"
12. Southern Pacific lightweight smooth side 4-4-2 sleeping car "Golden Moon"
13. Southern Pacific lightweight smooth side 4-4-2 sleeping car "Golden Strand" [Chicago-Tucson]
14. Southern Pacific lightweight smooth side 12 double bedroom sleeping car "Golden Orange" [Chicago-Phoenix]
15. Southern Pacific lightweight smooth side 10-6 sleeping car "Golden Sun"
16. Rock Island lightweight corrugated side 2-1 sleeper buffet lounge observation "La Mirada" (lettered for Golden Rocket)

== See also ==
- Passenger trains on the Southern Pacific Railroad
