= Sunbeam (train) =

Historic passenger train in Texas USA

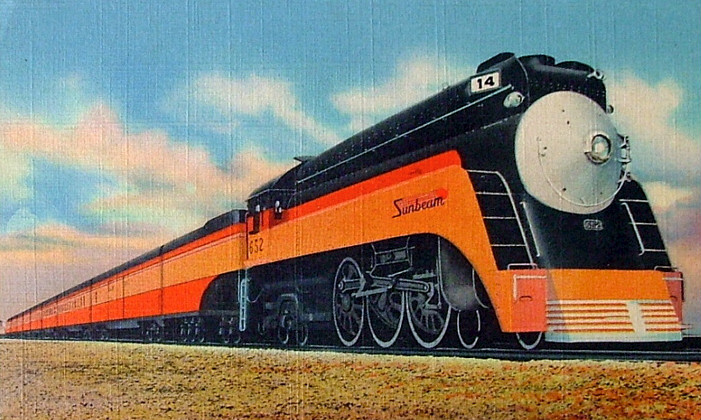

Overview
- Service type: Inter-city rail
- Status: Discontinued
- Locale: Texas
- First service: 1925
- Last service: 1957
- Successor: Dallas-Houston section of Texas Eagle (Amtrak)
- Former operators: Texas and New Orleans Railroad (Southern Pacific)

Route
- Termini: Houston, Texas
- Stops: Dallas, Texas
- Distance travelled: 264 miles (425 km)
- Service frequency: Daily
- Train numbers: Southbound: 13; Northbound: 14

On-board services
- Seating arrangements: Chair cars
- Catering facilities: Diner-lounge-observation car (1952)
- Observation facilities: Lounge car (1952)

Technical
- Track gauge: 4 ft 8 1/2 in (1,435 mm) standard gauge

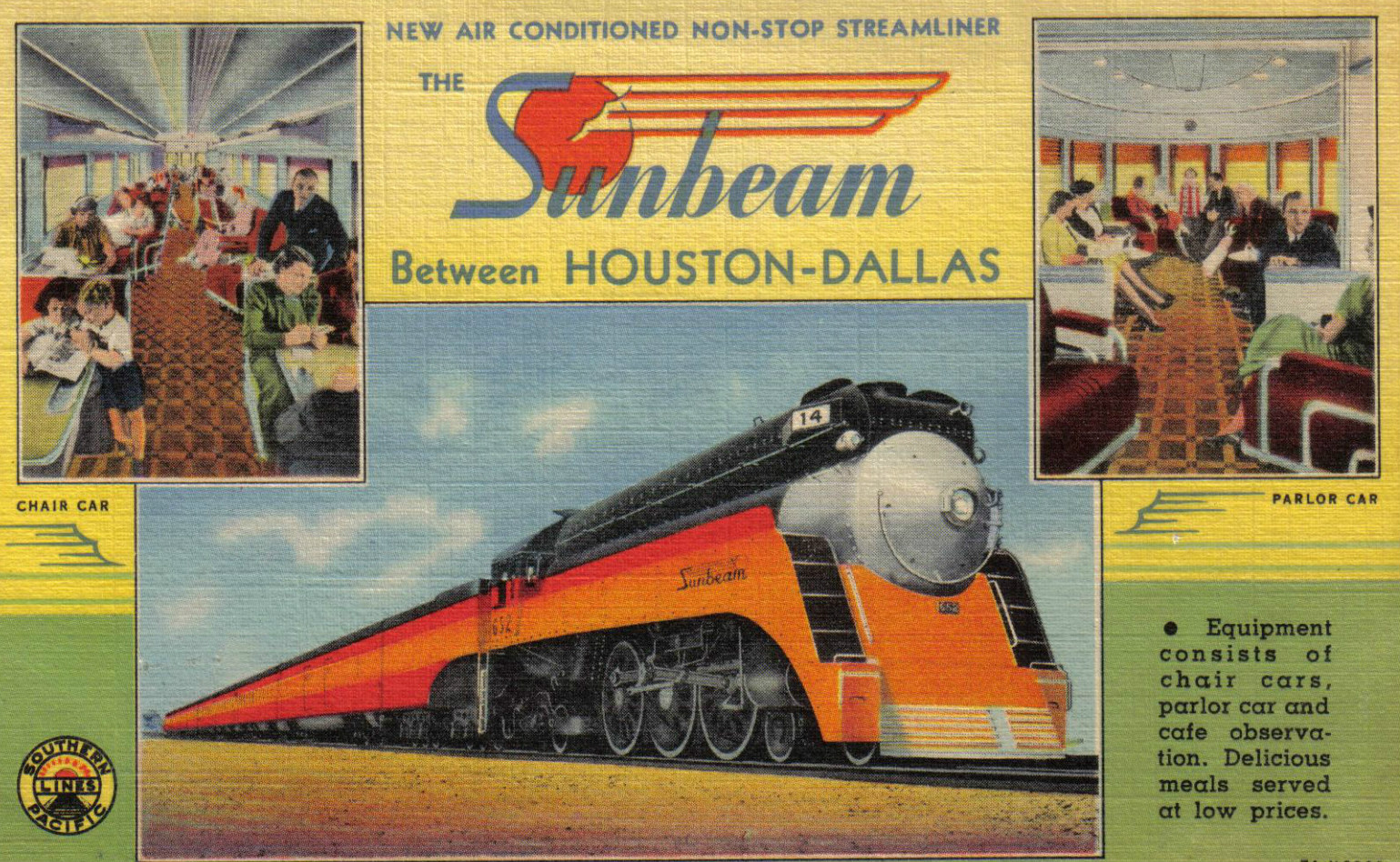
The streamlined train c. 1937

The Sunbeam was a named passenger train between Houston and Dallas on the Texas and New Orleans Railroad (T&NO), a subsidiary of the Southern Pacific Railroad (SP). The train carried number 13 northbound and number 14 southbound.

The Sunbeam began in 1925 as a heavyweight train. In June 1926 it took 6 1/2 hours each way, leaving Houston at noon and Dallas at 1:25 p.m.; in August 1937 it scheduled fifteen regular and flag stops in the 6 1/2-hour run. The Sunbeam was re-equipped on September 19, 1937, as a streamlined train in the Daylight paint scheme. The T&NO streamlined three P-14 class 4-6-2 Pacific locomotives and painted them with their Vanderbilt tenders in Daylight colors.

The initial streamliner schedule over the 264 miles (425 km) was 4 hours 45 minutes. Beginning June 1, 1938, the train made no passenger stops between the two largest cities in Texas, and the schedule was trimmed by twenty minutes to 4 hours 25 minutes (265 minutes) each way. The schedule was intended to match the competition, the Burlington-Rock Island's Texas Rocket and Sam Houston Zephyr, which ran 249.6 miles (401.7 km) between Houston and Dallas in 250 minutes and terminated in Fort Worth.

The Sunbeam (trains 13 and 14) operated in tandem with its slower sibling, the Hustler (trains 15 and 16) using primarily the same equipment. In August 1938 the streamlined Hustlers left Houston and Dallas at 8 a.m. and arrived at their destinations at 2 p.m., having made most local stops along the way. Each consist was then turned and returned as the Sunbeam, leaving Houston at 4:45 and Dallas at 5:00. By 1941 flag stops at Ennis and College Station had been added to the Sunbeam's schedule, but the 265-minute schedule continued into the 1950s. Both the Sunbeam and the Hustler would meet their respective counterparts at Kosse, near the mid-point of the run.

The Sunbeam had an overnight counterpart in the Southern Pacific's Owl (#17 northbound, and #18 southbound). This night train consisted of coaches, and in the sleeping cars, open sections and bedrooms.

With the advent of T&NO/SP's Diesel locomotive fleet after World War II, ALCO PAs were often assigned to the Sunbeam. The Hustler was discontinued on August 11, 1954, and the Sunbeam received a new schedule that allowed it to depart Houston's Grand Central Station in the morning and return from Dallas in the afternoon, now using just one set of equipment instead of two. The new schedule lasted only thirteen months, and the Sunbeam made its final round trip on September 11, 1955.
