= Armour, Texas =

Ghost town in Texas, US

- Ghost town
- Location in Texas
- Coordinates: 31.73599790°N 96.65748740°W
- Country: United States
- State: Texas
- County: Limestone
- Elevation: 256 ft (78 m)
- USGS Feature ID: 1381362

Armour is a ghost town in Limestone County, Texas, United States. Situated on Texas State Highway 171, it was established in 1882 and named for James Armour, who platted the town. A post office operated from 1883 to 1903. It peaked in 1890, with a population of one hundred recorded in one census. In 1903, the Trinity and Brazos Valley Railway bypassed Armour, and residents moved railside, abandoning the community.
