= Fort Worth and Denver Railway =

American railroad company

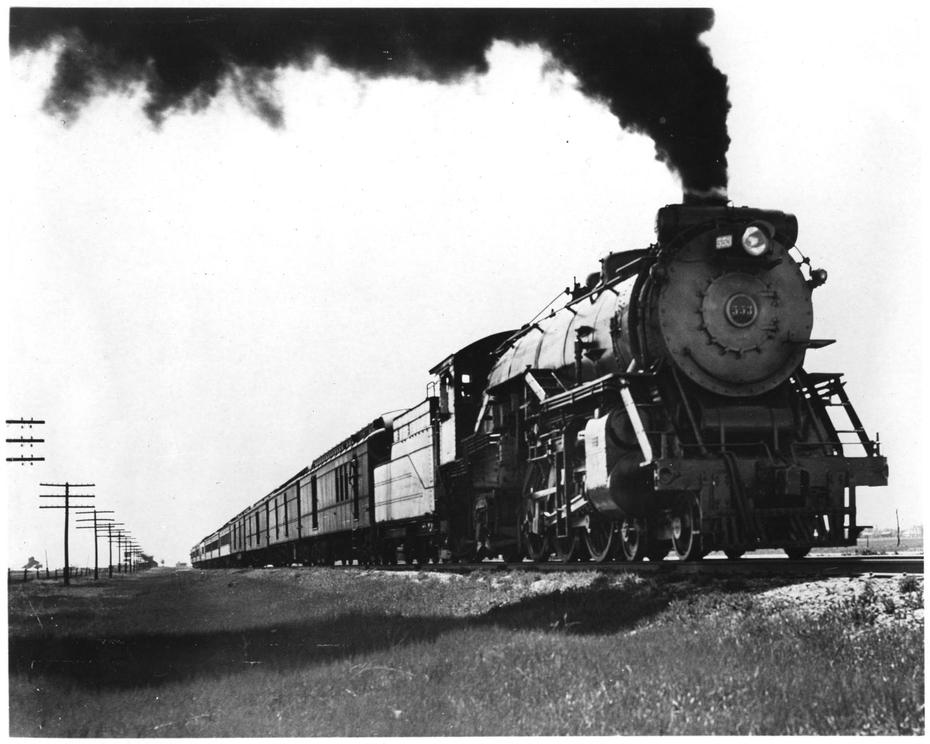
- The Fort Worth and Denver City's Colorado Special rolls through the Texas Panhandle, 1929.

Overview
- Headquarters: Fort Worth, Texas
- Reporting mark: FWD
- Locale: Texas
- Dates of operation: 1881–1982
- Successor: Burlington Northern Railroad

Technical
- Track gauge: 4 ft 8 1/2 in (1,435 mm) standard gauge

The Fort Worth and Denver Railway (reporting mark FWD), nicknamed "the Denver Road," was a class I American railroad company that operated in the northern part of Texas from 1881 to 1982, and had a profound influence on the early settlement and economic development of the region.

The Fort Worth and Denver City Railway Company (FW&DC) was chartered by the Texas Legislature on May 26, 1873. On August 7, 1951, the company changed its name to the Fort Worth and Denver Railway Company (FW&D).

The main line of the railroad ran from Fort Worth through Wichita Falls, Childress, Amarillo, and Dalhart, to Texline, where it connected with the rails of parent company Colorado and Southern Railway, both of which became subsidiaries of the Burlington Route in 1908.

At the end of 1970, FW&D operated 1,201 mi (1,933 km) of road on 1,577 mi (2,538 km) of track; that year it reported 1493 million ton-miles of revenue freight. (Those totals may or may not include the former Burlington-Rock Island Railroad.) In 1980, operated mileage had dropped to 1181, but freight was 7732 million ton-miles.

== Construction ==
The Panic of 1873 delayed the start of construction until 1881, when Grenville M. Dodge became interested in the project. As chief engineer for the Union Pacific Railroad, Dodge had played a large part in the construction of the first transcontinental railroad. Dodge organized the Texas and Colorado Railway Improvement Company in 1881 to build and equip the FW&DC in return for $20,000 in stock and $20,000 in bonds for each mile of track laid. In the same year, the FW&DC and the Denver and New Orleans Railroad Company, organized in Colorado, agreed to connect their systems at the Texas-New Mexico border. The FW&DC received no state subsidy other than the right-of-way easements to cross state-owned lands totaling 2,162 acres (8.75 km^{2}).

Construction began at Hodge Junction, just north of Fort Worth, on November 27, 1881, and by September 1882, Dodge had completed 110 mi (180 km) of track to Wichita Falls, Texas. By 1885, the line reached Harrold; by 1886, Chillicothe; by 1887, Clarendon and Amarillo; and by 1888, Texline on the New Mexico border. Continuing into the New Mexico Territory, the FW&DC finally linked with the D&NO where the railheads met at Union Park, near present-day Folsom, New Mexico, 528 mi (850 km) from Fort Worth, on March 14, 1888.

Service between Fort Worth and Denver began on April 1, 1888. In 1895, Dodge became president of the company, one of several railroads in which he held a financial interest.

== Expansion ==
In 1899, the FW&DC was acquired by the Colorado and Southern Railway, successor to the D&NO. The C&S itself was bought by the Chicago, Burlington and Quincy Railroad in 1908, but the three companies continued to operate as separate legal entities. In part, this separation was due to Texas law, which required all railroads operating in the state to have their headquarters in Texas. This had the effect of requiring all operating railroads in Texas to be wholly owned, even if independent companies of the regional or national roads.

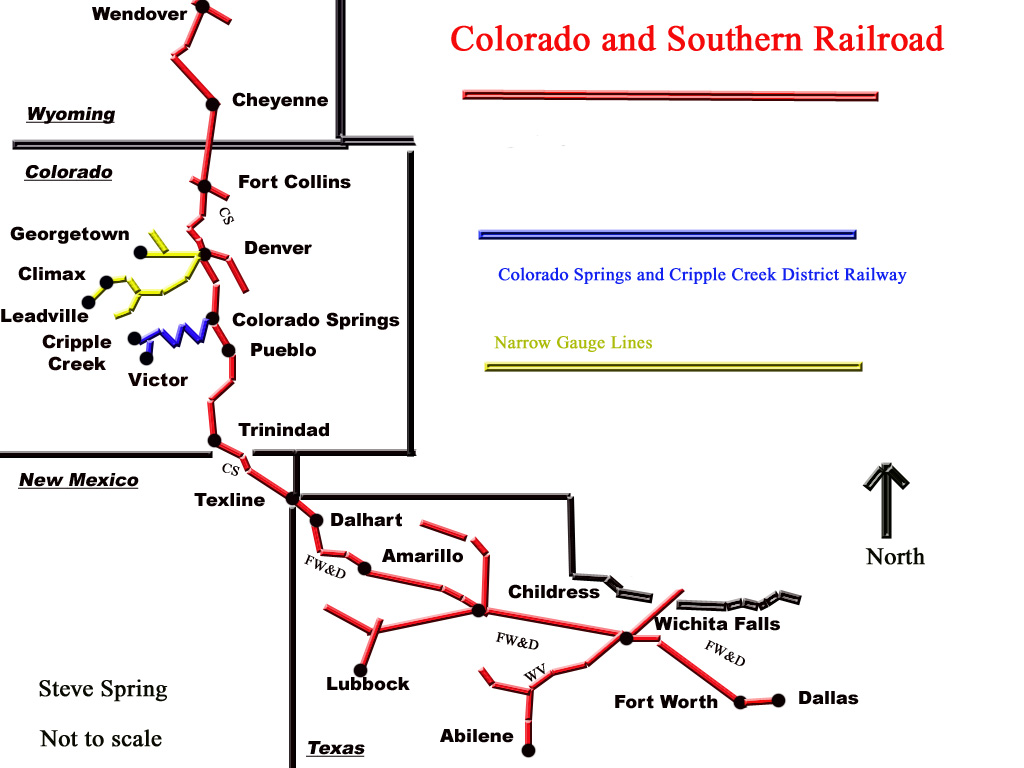
Map of the Colorado and Southern Railway lines, including the Fort Worth and Denver City lines in Texas

The FW&DC was the first rail line to penetrate the northwest part of Texas, which contributed greatly to the growth of Texas cities such as Wichita Falls, Childress, Amarillo, and Dalhart. In addition, the railroad actively promoted settlement of the rural areas it served, providing free seeds, trees, and tree seedlings to farmers and ranchers to promote cotton- and wheat-growing, as well as erosion prevention.

In the first four decades of the 20th century, the FW&DC built or acquired a number of feeder lines in its territory, so that by 1940, the Burlington-owned system operated 1,031 mi (1,659 km) of main track in Texas in addition to the Burlington-Rock Island Railroad.

The Fort Worth and Denver City leased the Fort Worth and Denver South Plains (completed in 1928, 206 mi (332 km) from Estelline to Plainview and Lubbock; the Fort Worth and Denver Northern (completed in 1932, 110 mi (180 km) from Childress to Pampa); and the Fort Worth and Denver Terminal (providing access to railyards and terminals in Fort Worth). In reality, all three lines were projects of the parent company from the outset.

Several feeder lines operated by the Wichita Valley Railway Company (another subsidiary of the Colorado and Southern) connected with the FW&DC at Wichita Falls, including the Wichita Valley Railway (Wichita Falls to Seymour), the Wichita Valley Railroad (Seymour to Stamford), the Abilene and Northern (Stamford to Abilene, Texas), the Stamford & Northwestern (Stamford to Spur), and the Wichita Falls and Oklahoma Railway (Wichita Falls to Byers and Waurika, Oklahoma). In 1952, the Wichita Valley and its subsidiaries were merged into the Fort Worth and Denver Railway.

In 1925, the FW&DC had extended service from Fort Worth to Dallas by acquiring trackage rights over the Rock Island Railroad between those cities. At Dallas, FW&DC trains connected with the Burlington-Rock Island Railroad for through service to Houston.

== Passenger trains ==
The premier passenger train of the FW&DC was the streamlined Texas Zephyr (trains #1 and 2), which operated between Dallas and Denver from August 22, 1940, to September 11, 1967. Other passenger trains included the Gulf Coast Special (train #7, Denver and Dallas), the Colorado Special (train #8, Dallas and Denver), and the Sam Houston Zephyr (trains #3 and 4 -Ft. Worth - Dallas - Teague - Houston), Twin Star Rocket (trains #507 and 508) as well as motorcars over the South Plains line between Childress and Lubbock and over the Wichita Valley between Wichita Falls and Abilene.

== Peak and decline ==
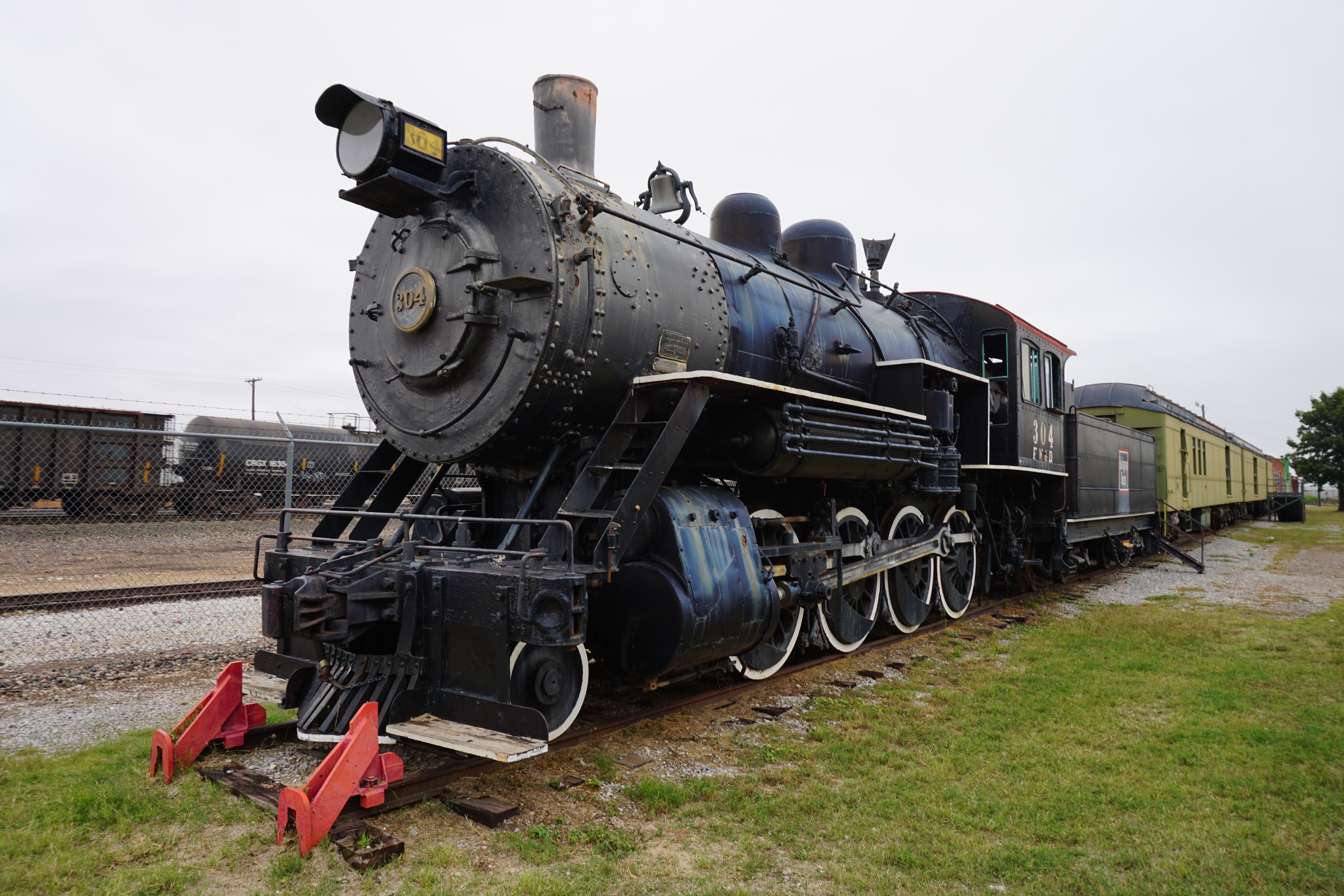
Fort Worth & Denver Alco 2-8-0 No. 304 at the Wichita Falls Railroad Museum

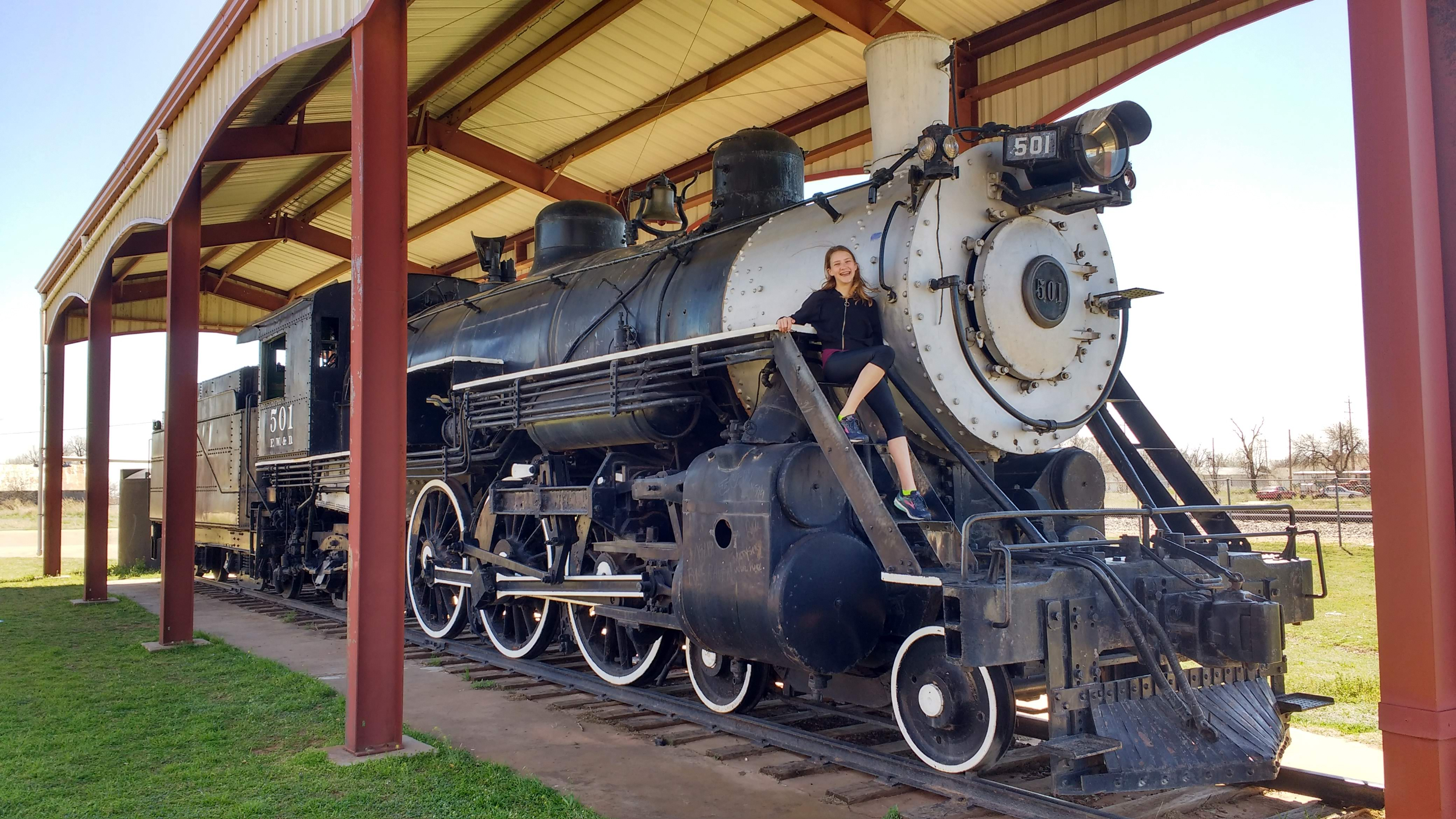
FW&D Engine 501 in Childress, Texas

At the railroad's peak in 1944, during the World War II economic boom, the Texas Railroad Commission reported that the FW&DC earned $12,132,515 in freight revenue, $5,839,399 in passenger revenue, and $1,488,095 in other revenue. However, by 1972, in the face of competition from interstate highway traffic and airlines, the Fort Worth and Denver owned 20 locomotives and 1,520 freight cars, but operated at a loss of $1,743,551.

== Successor companies ==
In 1970, the Chicago, Burlington and Quincy Railroad, the Great Northern Railway, and the Northern Pacific Railroad merged themselves into a single railroad, the Burlington Northern Railroad, but their subsidiaries in Colorado and Texas continued to have a separate legal existence until the Burlington Northern acquired the Fort Worth and Denver Railway by virtue of the merger between BN and the Colorado and Southern Railroad on December 31, 1981. The Fort Worth and Denver Railway's corporate existence came to an end when it was formally merged into Burlington Northern Railroad on December 31, 1982.

The FW&D's former main line through the Texas Panhandle and North Texas is now a heavily used route of BN's successor, the BNSF Railway, primarily for coal and intermodal trains between Fort Worth and the western United States. Additionally, the Union Pacific Railroad has track rights on this line from Fort Worth to Dalhart. No passenger trains have operated in scheduled revenue service on this route, though, since the FW&D ended all passenger service in 1967, before the creation of Amtrak in 1971.

== Rails to trails ==
In 1989, BN abandoned the former Fort Worth and Denver South Plains track between Estelline and Lubbock. In 1993, the Texas Parks and Wildlife Department acquired 64 mi (103 km) of the abandoned right-of-way between Estelline and the town of South Plains to create the Caprock Canyons State Park and Trailway's hike and bike trail. A unique feature is the 528 ft (161 m) Clarity Railroad Tunnel.

The Saints' Roost Museum in Clarendon houses a restored Fort Worth and Denver Railway depot.

== See also ==
- Roscoe, Snyder and Pacific Railway
- Texas–New Mexico Railroad
- West Texas and Lubbock Railway
- Texas and Pacific 400
- Wichita Falls Railroad Museum

== Bibliography ==
- "Fort Worth and Denver Railway Company" from the Handbook of Texas Online. URL accessed on April 3, 2006.
- Goen, Steve Allen. Fort Worth & Denver: Color Pictorial. Four Ways West Publications, 1996. ISBN 1885614128
- Overton, Richard C. (1965). Burlington Route: A History of the Burlington Lines. Knopf. ISBN 0803258534
- Overton, Richard C. Gulf to Rockies: The Heritage of the Fort Worth and Denver - Colorado and Southern Railways, 1861-1898. Austin: University of Texas Press, 1953, rev. ed. 1970. ISBN 0837130352
- Wagner, F. Hol. The Colorado Road: History, Motive Power, and Equipment of the Colorado and Southern and Fort Worth and Denver Railways. Intermountain Chapter, National Railway Historical Society, 1970. ASIN B0015YX8ZO
