= Teague station =

- Trinity and Brazos Valley Railroad Depot and Office Building
- U.S. National Register of Historic Places
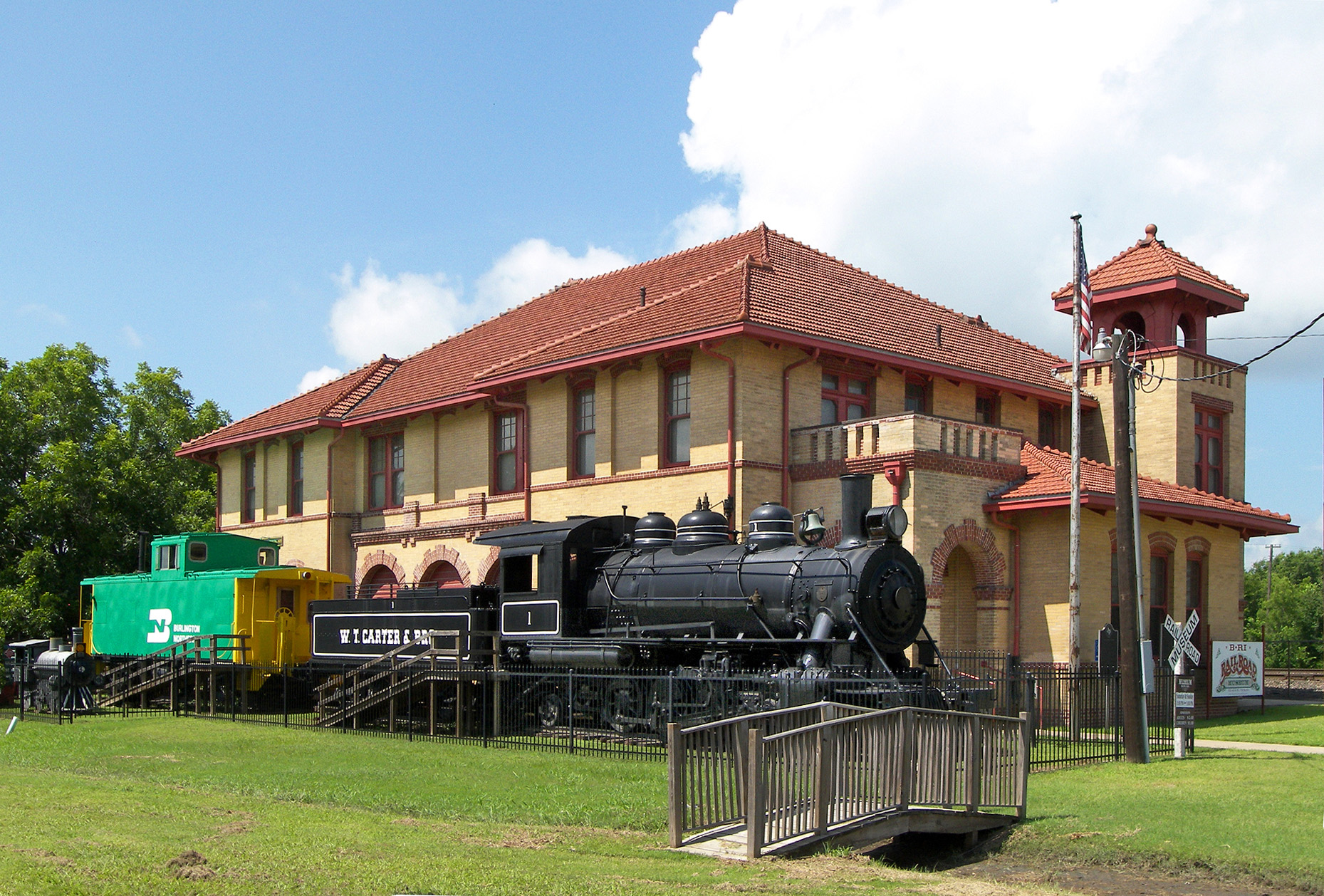

- Location within Texas
- Location: 208 S. 3rd Ave., Teague, Texas
- Coordinates: 31°37′33″N 96°17′07″W
- Area: less than one acre
- Built: 1907
- Architect: Page, C.H., Jr.
- Architectural style: Renaissance, Mission/spanish Revival
- NRHP reference No.: 79002940
- Added to NRHP: March 21, 1979

The Trinity and Brazos Valley Railroad Depot and Office Building, at 208 South 3rd Avenue in Teague, Texas, was built in 1907. It was listed on the National Register of Historic Places in 1979. It serves as the B-RI Railroad Museum.

It was designed by Austin architect Charles Henry Page.

It includes elements of Renaissance and Mission/Spanish Revival.

The building was deemed significant as one of the first brick buildings in Teague, and as the main office for the Trinity and Brazos Valley Railroad, which was founded in 1902. Per its NRHP nomination, "Its design and durability indicate the confidence with which the new company began its operations and the importance which the railroad company once placed on its passenger business."

The depot served passengers from 1907 until passenger service was discontinued in 1966. The railroad's offices moved away in 1968 and the depot was sold to the city of Teague in 1979. It became the Burlington and Rock Island Railroad museum in 1970.

It is also a Texas State Antiquities Landmark.

Preceding station	Burlington Route	Following station
Kirvin toward Denver	Denver – Teague	Terminus
Preceding station	Chicago, Rock Island and Pacific Railroad	Following station
Terminus	Teague – Minneapolis	Kirvin toward Minneapolis
Preceding station	Burlington-Rock Island Railroad	Following station
Terminus	Teague – Houston	Donie toward Houston
