= Texas Zephyr =

Passenger train service in Texas and Colorado

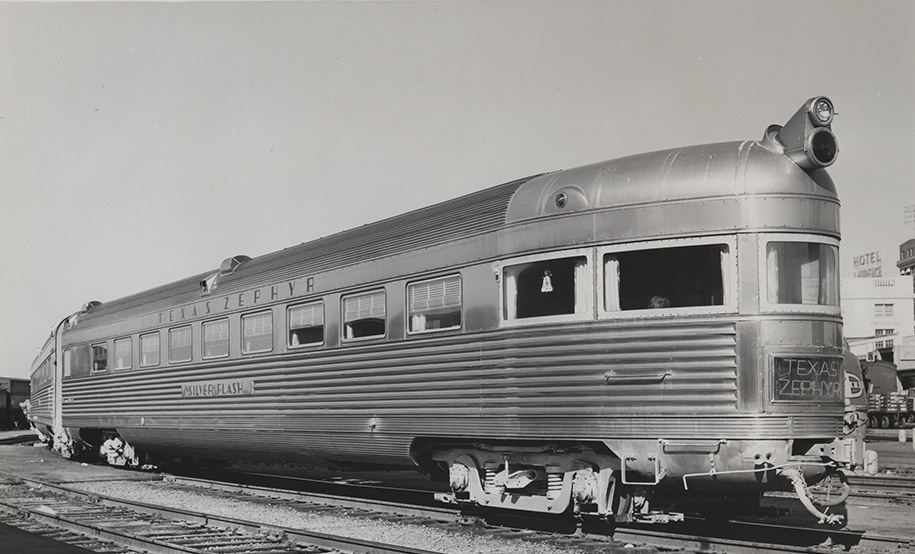
- Observation car No. 230, "Silver Flash", on the Texas Zephyr at Dallas in 1960

Overview
- Service type: Inter-city rail
- Status: Discontinued
- Predecessor: Colorado Special and Gulf Coast Special
- First service: August 23, 1940
- Last service: September 10, 1967
- Former operators: Colorado & Southern (Burlington Route); Fort Worth & Denver (Burlington Route)

Route
- Termini: Denver, Colorado; Dallas, Texas
- Distance travelled: 835.1 miles (1,344.0 km)
- Average journey time: 18 hours, 45 minutes, southbound; 17 hours, 30 minutes, northbound
- Service frequency: Daily
- Train numbers: Southbound: 1 Northbound: 2

On-board services
- Seating arrangements: Reclining seat coaches
- Sleeping arrangements: Sections, double bedrooms, compartments, drawing room
- Catering facilities: Dining-lounge car

Technical
- Track gauge: 4 ft 8 1/2 in (1,435 mm)

The Texas Zephyr was a named passenger train operated by the Colorado & Southern Railway and the Fort Worth & Denver Railway (both subsidiaries of the Chicago, Burlington & Quincy Railroad). The train was originally designated number 1 southbound, and number 2 northbound. It ran from Denver, Colorado to Dallas, Texas.

== History ==
Inaugurated on August 23, 1940, the streamlined train ran from Denver Union Station to Fort Worth and Dallas, Texas, replacing the heavyweight Colorado Special. At Dallas, the Texas Zephyr connected with the Sam Houston Zephyr and Texas Rocket, both operating on the jointly owned Burlington-Rock Island Railroad for through service to Houston.

Initially, the train was equipped with Budd-built streamlined stainless steel chair cars and an observation dining-lounge car. Sleeping cars were, however, rebuilt streamlined heavyweight cars. The train was pulled between Denver and Fort Worth by pairs of General Motors Electro-Motive Division stainless steel E5 diesels. To allow adequate time for servicing the diesel locomotives in Fort Worth, a FW&D 550 class 4-6-2 "Pacific" type steam locomotive shuttled the train between Fort Worth and Dallas. It was later replaced by sister E5 diesel locomotives purchased by the C&S from parent CB&Q.

In 1957, the re-equipping of the 1936 Denver Zephyr made those trainsets available, and they were assigned to the Texas Zephyr. Though older than the original Texas Zephyr equipment, they offered more luxurious amenities. These consists ran on the Texas Zephyr until February 1965, when they were retired and the original equipment restored to the train, albeit with Pullman pool streamlined cars or sleeping cars from the parent CB&Q.

As a result of it losing its U.S. Mail railway post contract, the Fort Worth & Denver abandoned all passenger service in 1967, the Texas Zephyr making its last run on September 10 of that year.

== Major stops ==
- Denver
- Colorado Springs
- Pueblo
- Trinidad
- Amarillo
- Wichita Falls
- Fort Worth
- Dallas
