= EMC TA =

American diesel-electric locomotive model

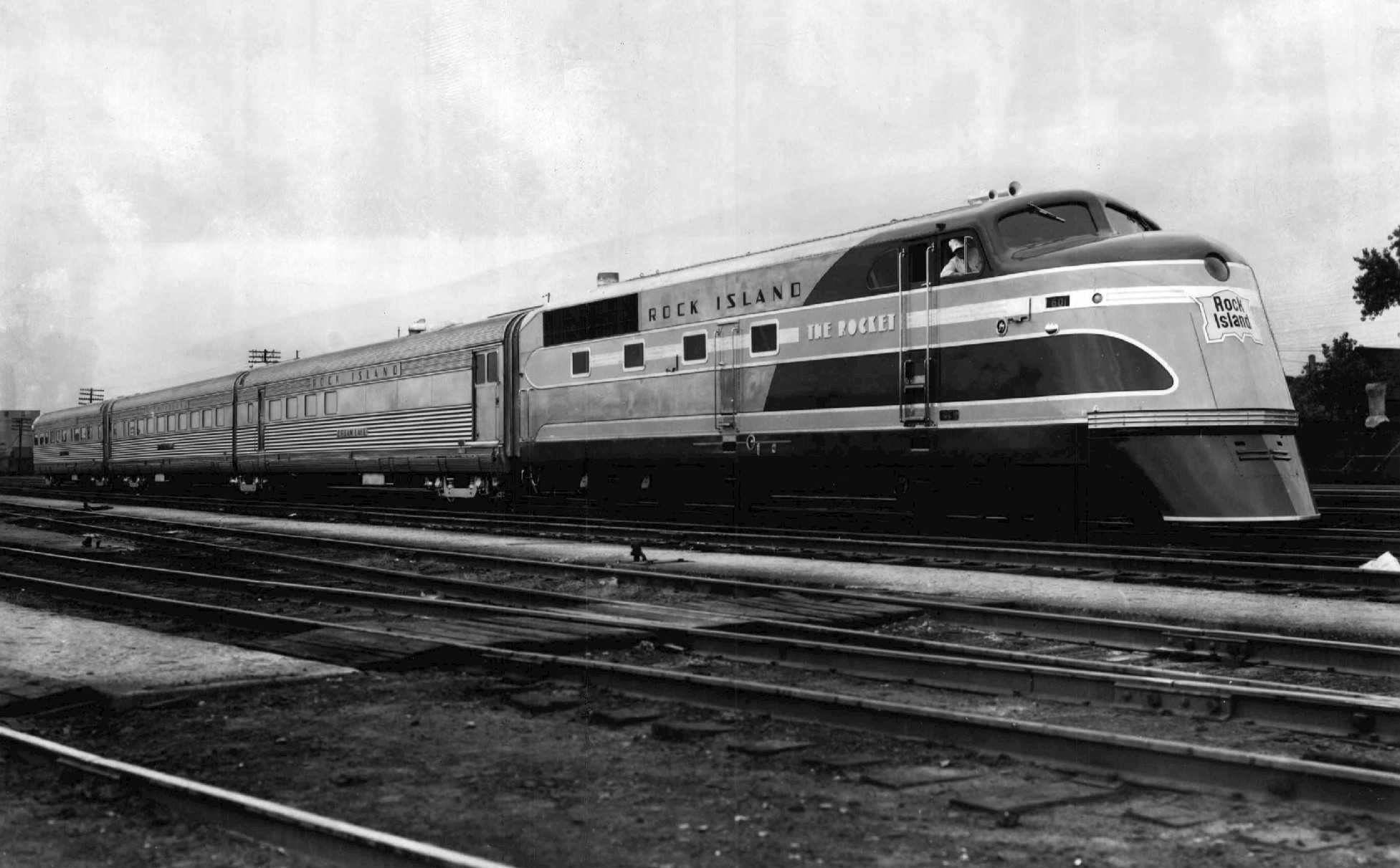
- Rock Island #601
Type and origin
- Power type: Diesel-electric
- Builder: Electro-Motive Corporation (EMC)
- Serial number: 735-740
- Build date: August–October, 1937
- Total produced: 6
Specifications
- Configuration
  - AAR: B-B
  - UIC: Bo'Bo'
- Gauge: 4 ft 8 1/2 in (1,435 mm) standard gauge
- Length: 60 ft 10 in (18.54 m)
- Height: 13 ft 11 in (4.24 m)
- Prime mover: Winton 201-A
- Engine type: V16
- Cylinders: 16
- Train heating: Steam generator, 2 off
Performance figures
- Maximum speed: 110 mph (180 km/h)
- Power output: 1,200 hp (890 kW)
Career
- Operators: Rock Island
- Numbers: 601–606
- Retired: 1957–1958
- Disposition: All scrapped

The EMC-TA was a model of diesel locomotive produced for the Chicago, Rock Island and Pacific Railroad by the Electro-Motive Corporation in 1937. The original six Rock Island Rockets streamliners were three- or four-car stainless-steel semi-articulated trainsets built by Budd Company, powered by six identical locomotives, #601-606. The locomotives were classified as model TA—the T indicating Twelve hundred hp (890 kW), the A indicating an A unit (cab-equipped lead locomotive). The Rock Island Line was EMC's only customer for the TA locomotive model.

The styling of the TAs resembled the A units of the contemporary EA and E1 built in 1937, but the single 1,200 hp Winton 201-A motor provided only two-thirds the power of the E-units' 1,800 hp twin motor arrangement, the TAs were shorter and lighter, and they rode two-axle rather than three-axle trucks. Future locomotives for high-speed and long-distance passenger service would follow the direction taken by the EA/EB, E1 and E2; EMC's FT locomotives introduced in 1939 would adapt the single-engine two-axle truck layout of the TA and the cab/booster format of the E units to freight service. With the introduction of the E-series and the TA units EMC undertook regular production of locomotives of their own design, opening the standardized mass production phase in marketing Diesel power for passenger service.

Like the E-series and F-series locomotives, the TA was constructed as a carbody truss rather than having a separate chassis, a weight-saving innovation of early streamliners adapted to full-sized locomotives. The single Winton 201-A V16 engine was placed centrally, centered on the side door and twin flanking windows. The generator was attached behind it, with a cooling fan and air compressor after that. The rear of the unit was taken up with two steam generators for train heating and reservoirs for the air brakes. The cab sat two crew, engineer on the right and fireman on the left. The sloped nose contained air brake and train control equipment; beneath them sat the batteries, and beneath the cab was the water reservoir for the train heating boilers. Fuel was carried beneath the locomotive between the bogie. The trucks were 2-axle, both axles powered, giving the locomotive a B-B wheel arrangement.

The original paint scheme was maroon, red and silver; the bright red was a band at window height and another lower down, linking up at the nose. The rest of the nose end of the locomotive was maroon, and this color continued back at the base of the locomotive beneath the bright red stripe. The rear body of the locomotive was silver to match the train's stainless steel finish. Liberal amounts of stainless steel trim were applied, including "THE ROCKET" behind the cab doors, while "ROCK ISLAND" was painted in maroon against the silver locomotive sides.

As delivered, the TAs had a single headlight, but within a few years the Rock Island added a second, gyrating headlight for additional warning at grade crossings. In the 1950s the railroad added new, larger number boards and removed the side skirting and the rear diaphragms from most of the locomotives. Other additions included MU receptacles next to the upper headlight and replacing the retractable front couplers with fixed ones.

When the original Rocket trainsets were withdrawn from service, the TAs, unlike the power units of many early streamliners, were able to continue in service, as they were fully separate locomotives capable of hauling ordinary railroad cars. They served long second careers hauling local and suburban trains. The TAs were finally retired between 1957 and 1958; all were scrapped.

== Additional Reading ==
- Hayden, Bob, ed. (1980). Model Railroader Cyclopedia - Volume 2: Diesel Locomotives. Kalmbach. ISBN 0-89024-547-9.
- Pinkepank, Jerry A. (1973). The Second Diesel Spotter's Guide. Milwaukee, Wisconsin: Kalmbach Publishing Co. pp. 107–108, 111. ISBN 0-89024-026-4.
- Marre, Louis A. (1982). Rock Island diesel locomotives 1930–1980. Cincinnati, Ohio: Railfax, Inc. pp. 71–72. ISBN 0-942192-00-1.
