= Arizona Limited =

American streamliner train from 1940 to 1942

Overview
- Service type: Inter-city rail
- Status: Discontinued
- Locale: Midwestern United States/Southwestern United States
- First service: December 15, 1940
- Last service: 1942
- Former operator(s): Rock Island Rail Road; Southern Pacific Railroad

Route
- Termini: Chicago, Illinois; Phoenix, Arizona

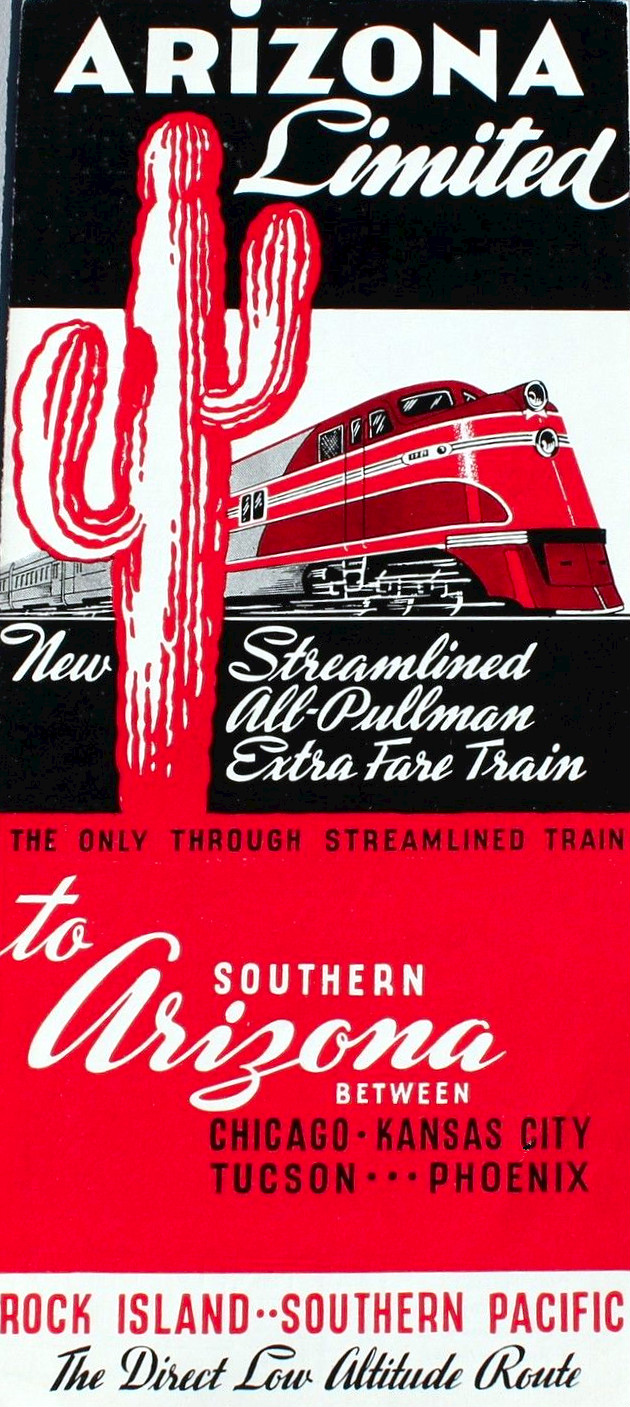
This is the front of a 1940 brochure advertising the Arizona Limited.

The Arizona Limited was an extra-fare streamliner train operated by the Southern Pacific and Chicago, Rock Island and Pacific Railroad from 1940 until 1942 on the Golden State route from Chicago, Illinois, to Phoenix, Arizona, via Tucumcari, New Mexico. It was aimed at travelers wanting to get away from winter weather conditions. Like the Santa Fe Chief, the Arizona Limited was streamlined in steam on the Southern Pacific. The Rock Island used both pre-war EMD E6 and Alco-GE DL103b, DL-105, and DL-107 locomotives out of Chicago. These had the maroon and silver "Rocket" liveries. The train itself was painted in the pre-war Pullman two-tone gray livery.

The train was an all-Pullman extra fare limited assembled prior to World War II for the specialized purpose of providing winter Pullman sleeping car service to Phoenix, Arizona. The Rock Island-Southern Pacific Golden State, traveling the "low altitude route", had also serviced Arizona and the southern California (Palm Springs) resort areas since its inception on 2 November 1902.

The first run of the Arizona Limited left Chicago on 15 December 1940 and provided two-night out service to Tucson and Phoenix. The train ran every-other-day. Its consist was semi-streamlined. The Rock Island refurbished heavyweight baggage dormitory cars (6014 and 6015) and diners (8028 and 8031) for the train. These cars ran at the front of the train, with the streamlined sleeping cars and observation car trailing.

During its two seasons, December to April, 1940–41 and 1941–42, the Arizona Limited carried four to six streamlined Pullmans from the "Cascade" (pre-war 10-roomette, five-double bedroom car) and "Imperial" series (pre-war four double bedroom, four compartment, two drawing room car) Pullman pool.

Lounge and observation space on the Arizona Limited was provided during the first season by two special Pullman cars, both having an observation-lounge, two double bedrooms, one-compartment and one-drawing room; the American Milemaster, which had been on display at the 1939 New York World's Fair, and the Muskingum River, the all-stainless steel sister car to the American Milemaster. During the second season, the 1936 articulated two-car Pullman combination, originally named Advance and Progress, alternated with Muskingum River. This unique set provided both experimental duplex (staggered two-level) rooms as well as double bedrooms. The set had previously run on the Treasure Island Special, a combined Chicago and North Western Railway/Union Pacific Railroad/Southern Pacific Company Chicago – Los Angeles once-a-week train to the 1939–1940 Golden Gate International Exposition. At that time, their names were changed to Bear Flag and California Republic, which they retained in the service during the second and final season of the Arizona Limited.

After the discontinuance of the train, both of the original two single observation cars were transferred to the streamlined Southern Pacific Los Angeles – San Francisco Lark as both of its observation cars had been wrecked in 1942. The American Milemaster, renamed as simply EMD ET800, exists today as an EMD test car.

The Muskingum River car was unique in that it was constructed of flat-paneled stainless steel; that is, there was no fluting, as was the case on virtually all other stainless steel streamlined cars. The car was wrecked in 1959.

Both cars has their trademark tear-drop Pullman-Standard observation ends "squared off" in the middle 1950s to make them flexible for switching and mid-train use.

The Arizona Limited made its final run in 1942 following US Federal Government restrictions on seasonal train operations.
