= Valley Eagle =

Overview
- Service type: Inter-city rail
- Status: Discontinued
- Locale: Southwestern United States
- First service: 1948
- Last service: 1962
- Former operator(s): Missouri Pacific Railroad

Route
- Termini: Houston, Texas; Brownsville, Texas second section to Corpus Christi, Texas
- Distance travelled: 371 miles (597 km) (Houston-Brownsville)
- Average journey time: Southbound: 8 hrs 55 min Northbound: 8 hrs 25 min (1960)
- Service frequency: Daily (1948–1962)
- Train number(s): Southbound: 321; Northbound: 322 (1960)

On-board services
- Seating arrangements: Reclining seat coach

Technical
- Rolling stock: Streamlined passenger cars
- Track gauge: 4 ft 8 1/2 in (1,435 mm)

The Valley Eagle was a named streamliner passenger train of the Missouri Pacific Railroad that began in 1948. It ran from Houston, Texas's Union Station to Brownsville, Texas at the Mexico–United States border and a second section to Corpus Christi. It first carried the numbers #11 south and #12 northbound and in later years carried the number of #321 south and #322 heading north.

It made coordinated connections in Houston with trains from St. Louis (Texas Eagle #21/22), from Memphis (#201/202) and from New Orleans (Houstonian #309/310). The Valley Eagle had its final run in 1962.

== Night train counterpart ==
The Missouri Pacific Railroad also operated the Pioneer, a night train counterpart that outlasted the Valley Eagle. After the Pioneer lost its sleeping car and its name, it continued to 1965 or 1966 as an unnamed night train on the route.
