= Des Moines Rocket =

Former passenger train in Chicago

The Des Moines Rocket was a named passenger train of the Chicago, Rock Island and Pacific Railroad. It in initially ran between Chicago, Illinois and Des Moines, Iowa. The service was named in honor of the new lightweight, streamlined diesel-electric trains introduced in 1937. Service was suspended on August 21, 1960, in defiance of the Interstate Commerce Commission's orders to keep it running. Passenger extras were run between Davenport and Des Moines until the following year when an eastbound Golden State was offered as a replacement (without a westbound counterpart).

== Rolling stock ==
The train was introduced with one of the new Rock Island Rockets trainsets built by the Budd Company. The initial consist was:

- Articulated 3 car set:
  - 32 seat Baggage-dinette-coach #401 Norman Judd
  - 60 seat coach #307 Grenville Dodge
  - 76 seat coach #301 Henry Farnum
- 32 seat, 1 drawing room, parlor, buffet, observation car #451 L M Allen

== See also ==
- Quad Cities Rocket
