= Trinity and Brazos Valley Railway =

Defunct railway line in Texas, USA

Overview
- Reporting mark: TBV
- Locale: Texas
- Dates of operation: 1902–1930
- Successor: BRI

Technical
- Track gauge: 4 ft 8 1/2 in (1,435 mm) standard gauge

The Trinity and Brazos Valley Railway (reporting mark TBV) of Texas came into existence on October 7, 1902, originally chartered to build a railroad from Johnson County to the Beaumont area near the Gulf coast. It took its name from the Trinity and Brazos rivers. It was commonly known as the “Boll Weevil," though it referred to itself as the "Valley Road."

The first line opened between Hillsboro and Mexia in October 1903. It was extended north to Cleburne in January 1904, making a total of 78 miles of track between Cleburne and Mexia.

Financial problems in the system led to its purchase by Colorado and Southern Railway (C&S) on August 1, 1905. Benjamin F. Yoakum, a railroad executive who was a director of the C&S, was contracted to build more track in Trinity and Brazos Valley system. As part of the construction deal, C&S sold one-half of the securities issued for the project to Chicago, Rock Island and Pacific Railway (CRIP), making the T&BV half-owned by both CRIP and C&S parent Chicago, Burlington and Quincy Railroad.

A southern extension of 224 miles from Mexia to Houston was built from 1905-1907. An extension was also completed between Teague and Waxahachie in 1907. T&BV contracted with the Missouri-Kansas-Texas Railroad (MKT) between Waxahachie and Dallas, while it used Gulf, Colorado and Santa Fe Railway (GC&SF) tracks on its northwestern end between Cleburne and Fort Worth and on its southeastern end between Houston and Galveston. In Houston, T&BV took a one-quarter interest in the Houston Belt and Terminal Railway, which was being built by Yoakum at the time.

The Trinity and Brazos Valley was placed into receivership on June 16, 1914, having been unprofitable since 1905. Its trackage rights with MKT and GC&SF were canceled at that time. The receiver appointed was John W. Robins, replaced by L.H. Atwell and then John A. Hulen in 1919.

In 1930, the business was reorganized as the Burlington-Rock Island Railroad Company with Hulen as the first president. Operating 303 miles of track at that time, BRI was still owned by CRIP and C&S.

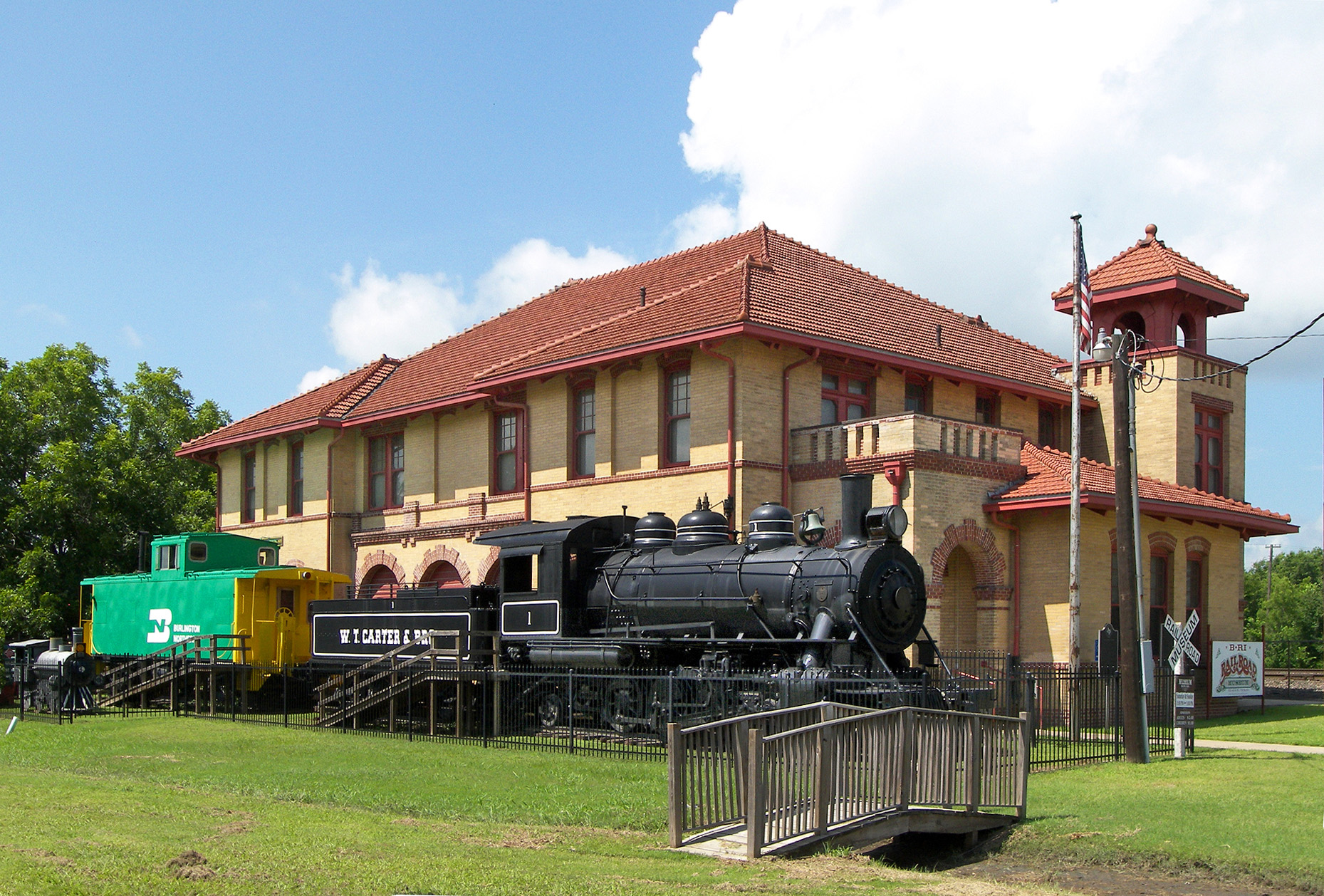
The former TBV station and office building, preserved and listed on the NRHP, in Teague

Today, the trackage from Teague to Houston is still in use as part of BNSF Railway. The portion from Teague to Cleburne has been abandoned.

== Financial information ==
The capital stock to begin the railroad was $300,000. In 1916, it reported earnings of over $1 million ($842,000 in freight and the rest in passenger). By 1926, it owned 37 locomotives and freight earnings had climbed to $2.6 million, with passenger earnings down 15 percent from 1916 levels.
