= Sam Houston Zephyr =

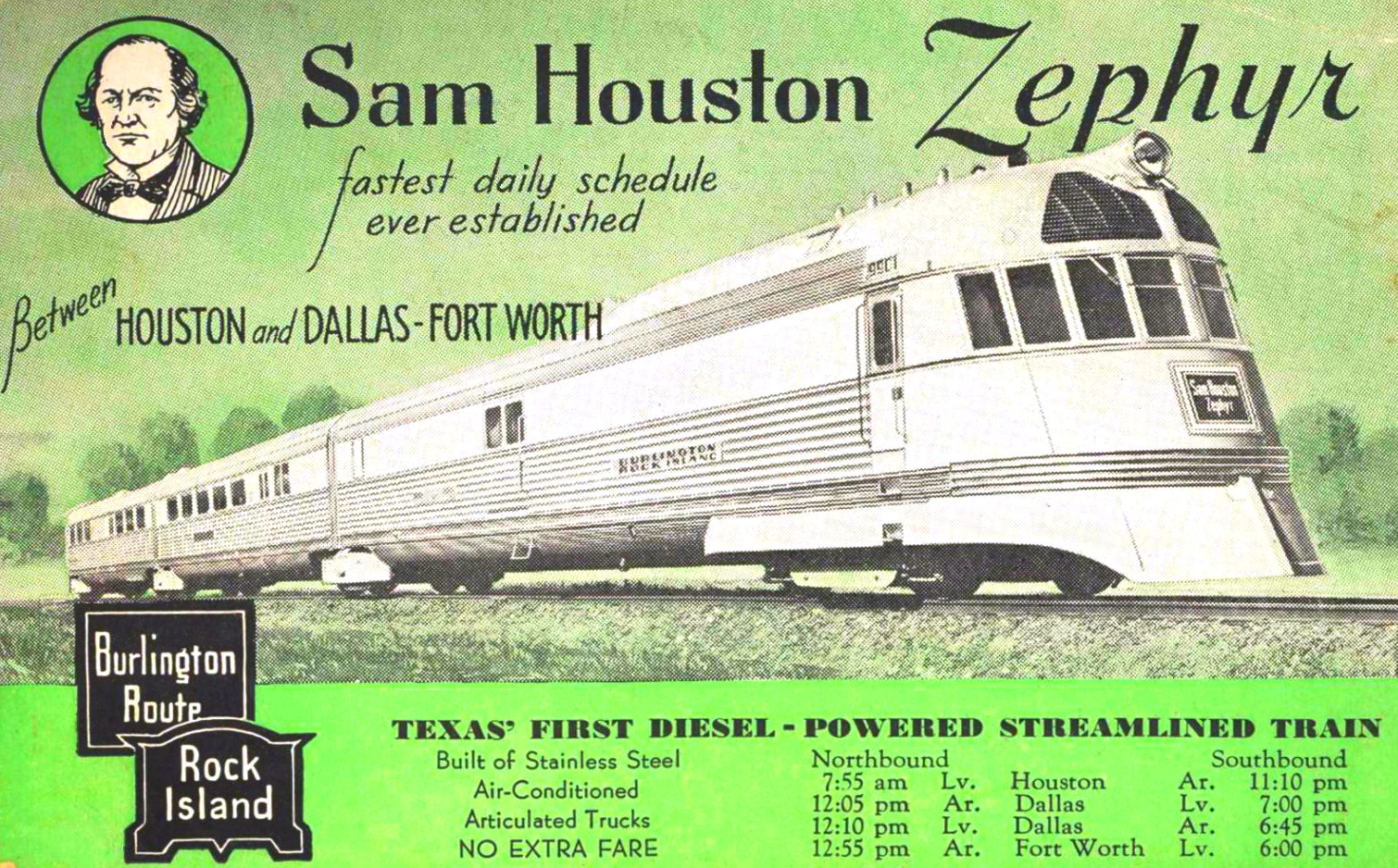
- First trainset of the line which was destroyed by fire in 1944.

Overview
- Service type: Inter-city rail
- First service: 1936
- Last service: 1966
- Former operators: Chicago, Burlington and Quincy Railroad; Chicago, Rock Island and Pacific Railroad

Route
- Termini: Fort Worth, Texas; Houston, Texas
- Distance travelled: 283.1 miles (455.6 km)
- Average journey time: 5 hours
- Train numbers: 3 and 4

On-board services
- Seating arrangements: Chair cars
- Observation facilities: Observation-parlor-diner

Technical
- Track gauge: 4 ft 8 1/2 in (1,435 mm)
- Track owner: Burlington-Rock Island Railroad

The Sam Houston Zephyr was a named passenger train operated by the Burlington-Rock Island Railroad, a subsidiary of both the Chicago, Burlington and Quincy Railroad and the Chicago, Rock Island and Pacific Railroad. It was the first streamlined passenger train in Texas.

Inaugurated on October 1, 1936, the year of the Texas centennial celebrations, the streamlined train was named for Texas hero Sam Houston. On its original schedule, the train ran from the Texas and Pacific station in Fort Worth to Union Station in Houston in exactly five hours, making only four intermediate stops in Dallas, Waxahachie, Corsicana, and Teague.

The train was designated number 3 southbound, and number 4 northbound. Its chief competitor was the Sunbeam, operated by the Texas and New Orleans Railroad (a subsidiary of the Southern Pacific) on a parallel route between Dallas and Houston.

One of the original trainsets from the Twin Cities Zephyr, number 9901, was transferred to begin this new route. While under the management of the Rock Island, Zephyr 9901 power car was destroyed by fire on December 19, 1944. The Rock Island did not maintain the train properly; the cause of the fire was oil residue which poor maintenance failed to remove. Because equipment was needed to keep the busy line running, the Rock Island replaced its Texas Rocket with the new Twin Star Rocket in July 1945.

Like many other passenger trains that experienced declining revenues in the face of competition from automobiles and airplanes in the 1950s and 1960s, the Sam Houston Zephyr was discontinued in 1966.
