= Twin Star Rocket =

U.S passenger train

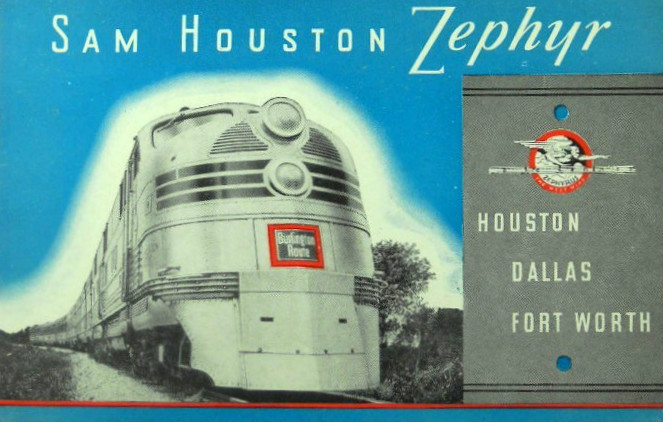
- Postcard with a image of the Twin Star Rocket.

Overview
- Service type: Inter-city rail
- Status: Discontinued
- Locale: Midwestern United States/Southwestern United States
- First service: 1945
- Last service: 1967
- Former operator: Chicago, Rock Island & Pacific Railroad

Route
- Termini: Minneapolis, Minnesota; Houston, Texas
- Stops: 26 intermediate stops
- Distance travelled: 1,363 mi (2,194 km)
- Average journey time: 25 hours, 50 minutes, southbound; 25 hours, 40 minutes, northbound
- Service frequency: Daily
- Train numbers: 507 (southbound) and 508 (northbound)

On-board services
- Seating arrangements: Coach
- Sleeping arrangements: Roomettes and double bedrooms
- Catering facilities: Dining car
- Observation facilities: Parlor lounge observation car (1957)

Technical
- Track gauge: 4 ft 8 1/2 in (1,435 mm)

The Twin Star Rocket was a passenger train operated by the Chicago, Rock Island and Pacific Railroad. Introduced on January 14, 1945, it was the only new streamlined train permitted to enter service in World War II by the U.S. government. The new train became the second longest north–south train itinerary under the management of a single railroad in the United States (and the longest measured by great circle distance) with its northern terminal at the Milwaukee Road’s Minneapolis depot and southern terminal 1,363 miles (2,194 km) away at Houston, Texas. The name of the new streamlined train was derived from its terminal states—Texas being known as the Lone Star State and Minnesota as the North Star State.

== Rolling stock ==
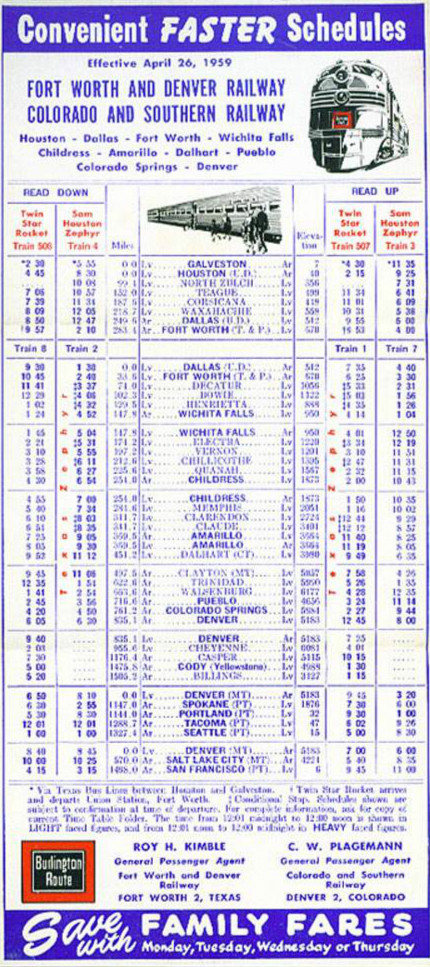
A fold-out Chicago, Burlington & Quincy Railroad schedule from 1959 shows the Twin Star Rocket schedule south of Fort Worth.

The Rock Island assigned the two Rocket train sets from the Kansas City–Minneapolis Rocket, and one train set from the Kansas City–Dallas Texas Rocket was transferred to the new Twin Star Rocket. The other Texas Rocket train set then began operating a daily round trip Rocket service between Oklahoma City and Kansas City. Another of the three-car Rocket trains operated an Oklahoma City–Dallas round trip daily.

=== Sleeping cars ===
The new Twin Star Rocket operated the Minneapolis–Kansas City segment of the trip in daylight hours in both directions, so no sleeping cars were initially carried between those cities. At Kansas City the southbound Twin Star Rocket added a lightweight 8-section, 5-double bedroom sleeping car for the overnight run to Houston. The northbound train carried another 8-section, 5-double bedroom sleeping car between Houston and Kansas City. The two lightweight streamlined sleeping cars originally assigned to the Twin Star Rocket were Forest Canyon and Thompson Canyon, two cars originally assigned to the Rocky Mountain Rocket as Kansas City–Denver cars. The Twin Star Rocket served Saint Paul Union Depot, Albert Lea, Des Moines, Kansas City, Topeka, Wichita, El Reno, Fort Worth and Dallas en route to Houston from Minneapolis. By 1957 the sections were replaced by modern roomettes.

=== Locomotives ===
The Rock Island powered these three streamlined consists with EMD E6A units taken from other schedules.

=== Baggage and dining cars ===
Each train set was assigned a heavyweight baggage-30-foot Railway Post Office cars, streamlined dining cars came from the Golden State and were known as the Cactus series as each was named for a cactus—#422 Yucca; #423 Sahuaro; and #424 Ocotillo. The Twin Star Rockets were fully streamlined in 1948.

== Decline and end ==
As with many passenger trains of the era, the Twin Star Rocket was gradually downgraded to reduce operating losses. In October 1964, the terminus was curtailed from Houston to Fort Worth, requiring passengers to transfer to the Sam Houston Zephyr. That train was cancelled in 1966. In March 1967, the Twin Star Rocket was discontinued.
