= Burlington-Rock Island Railroad =

Railway line in Texas, United States

Overview
- Headquarters: Teague, Texas
- Reporting mark: BRI
- Locale: Texas
- Dates of operation: 1930–1965

Technical
- Track gauge: 4 ft 8 1/2 in (1,435 mm) standard gauge

The Burlington-Rock Island Railroad (reporting mark BRI) was a joint railroad in Texas, United States. It came into existence on July 7, 1930, through the reorganization of its predecessor, the Trinity and Brazos Valley Railway Company (T&BV), nicknamed the "Boll Weevil Line."

Like its predecessor, the BRI was jointly owned by the Chicago, Burlington and Quincy Railroad (CB&Q) and the Chicago, Rock Island and Pacific Railroad (Rock Island), with each company owning half of the railroad. "It took its new name from the two owning systems and operated 303 miles (488 km) of track in 1930." In 1965, the BRI was foreclosed and its assets were divided evenly between the CB&Q and the Rock Island. In 1970, the CB&Q became part of the Burlington Northern Railroad, which assumed exclusive control of the former BRI after the Rock Island was liquidated in 1980, and fully absorbed the line in 1982. The line is now part of the BNSF Railway system.

== History ==
The Trinity and Brazos Valley Railway (T&BV) was originally chartered on October 9, 1902, its first trackage consisting of an 88-mile (142 km) line from Cleburne, Texas, to Mexia, Texas, which was finished in January 1904. Due to a shortage of operating capital to complete the project, the railroad was acquired in August 1905 by the Colorado and Southern Railway (C&S), which leased the property to its Fort Worth and Denver City Railway (FW&DC) subsidiary, (Note: Article X of the Texas Constitution originally required railroads operating in Texas to be headquartered in the state; to comply with this requirement, it was common for larger rail systems to establish operating subsidiaries in Texas. The requirement was nullified by the US Supreme Court in 1934 and formally repealed in 1969, but some subsidiaries continued to exist for years afterwards.) and later sold a half interest in its investment to the Rock Island. The Colorado and Southern was bought by the CB&Q in 1908. Due to the influx of funds from these well-heeled financial partners, by 1907 the T&BV line had been extended to Houston from the Mexia terminal, with a line also added between Waxahachie and Teague. Trackage rights were also soon arranged with other railroads linking the T&BV with Waxahachie and Dallas, Cleburne and Fort Worth, and Houston and Galveston.

With ongoing financial problems resulting from inadequate revenue, the Trinity and Brazos Valley went into receivership in 1914. A series of receivers were appointed including John W. Robbins (1914), L.H. Atwell, Jr, and in 1919, Gen. John A. Hulen. Hulen eventually became the first president of the BRI when the T&BV was reorganized.

== Reorganization ==
Hulen had begun improvements on the Trinity and Brazos while he was receiver, and this trend was continued after the reorganization. The two parent companies rotated their management of the BRI in 5 year intervals; the Rock Island started first and controlled the BRI until 1935. Soon after the reorganization an abandonment of the original right of way between Mexia and Cleburne began and was implemented in three stages, the first being the 30-mile (48 km) Cleburne to Hillsboro section (1932), next the 35-mile (56 km) section from Hillsboro to Hubbard (1935), and finally in 1942, the 23 miles (37 km) of track from Hubbard to Mexia.

Along with their partner the CB&Q, the BRI inaugurated the first streamlined passenger train service in Texas on October 1, 1936, the Sam Houston Zephyr. Listed as a CB&Q train, it ran from Dallas-Fort Worth to Houston. Not to be outdone, Rock Island in cooperation with the BRI inaugurated its own named streamlined passenger train in 1937, the Texas Rocket. The Rocket was replaced in January 1945 by the Twin Star Rocket, listed as a Rock Island train running between Houston and Minneapolis-St. Paul.

A major change came in 1950 when the Rock Island partnered with the former FW&DC (now renamed as the Fort Worth and Denver Railway or FW&D) to lease the BRI's line section from Teague to Houston, which they called the Joint Texas division.

The BRI never lived up to its financial promise and was foreclosed in April 1964. Its assets were purchased by the owning partners, each receiving an uncontested half interest in the property. The railroad's tangible assets became part of the FW&D and Rock Island in 1965 and the BRI was no more. The Rock Island declared bankruptcy on March 31, 1980, and was subsequently liquidated, leaving the FW&D in sole control; on December 31, 1982, the FW&D was formally merged into the Burlington Northern Railroad, which had been formed by the merger of the CB&Q with three other western US railroads in 1970. Burlington Northern would merge with the Atchison, Topeka, and Santa Fe Railway in 1996 to form the BNSF Railway.

In 1940 B-RI reported 78 million net ton-miles of revenue freight and 16 million passenger miles; at the end of that year it operated 255 miles of railroad.

== Burlington-Rock Island Zephyrs and Rockets ==
- Sam Houston Zephyr (Dallas-Fort Worth–Houston) (with CB&Q)
- Texas Rocket (Dallas-Fort Worth–Houston) (counterpart to the Zephyr with Rock Island)
- Twin Star Rocket (Houston–Minneapolis-St. Paul) (with Rock Island)
