= Rocket (Rock Island trains) =

Set of six historical American trains

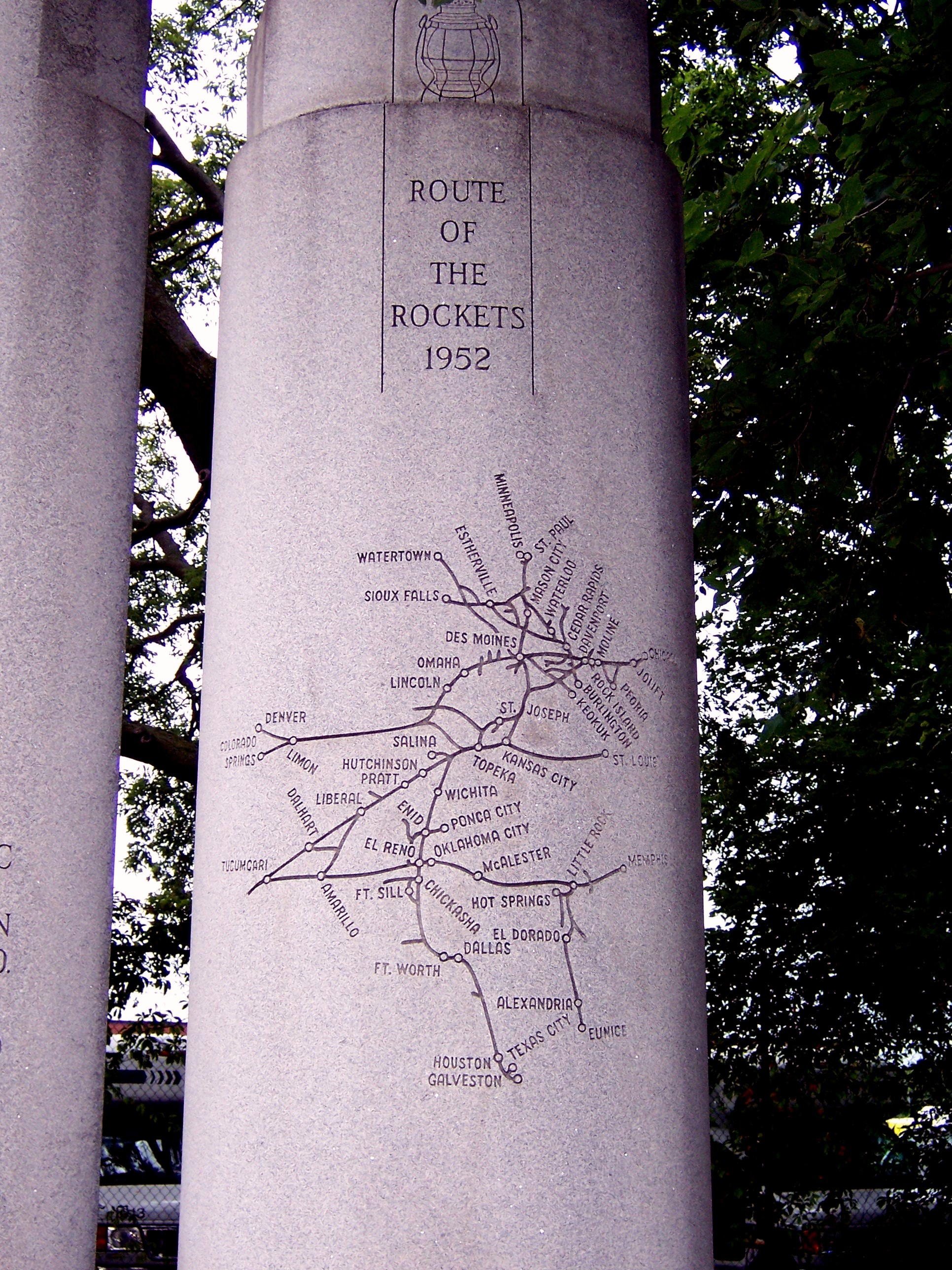
Monument showing the Rocket routes in 1952 at the former Rock Island Lines Passenger Station in Rock Island, Illinois

The Chicago, Rock Island and Pacific Railroad Rockets were lightweight, streamlined locomotive-hauled passenger trains built by the Budd Company. These six trains were the first streamlined equipment purchased by the Rock Island, as well as being its first diesel-powered passenger trains. Four of the trains consisted of three cars each, the other two each had four cars.

== Train design ==
The stainless steel trains were each powered by an Electro-Motive Corporation model TA locomotive. Unlike many other early streamlined trains, the locomotives were not permanently attached to the trains.

The trains were articulated except for the observation cars. Later, as the railroad streamlined more trains on more routes, the list of "Rocket" trains grew.

== List of trains ==
The six trains as originally assigned were:

- The Peoria Rocket, Chicago, Illinois to Peoria, Illinois
  - Articulated 3 car set:
    - 32 seat Baggage-dinette-coach #400 Joliet
    - 60 seat coach #306 Ottawa
    - 76 seat coach #300 La Salle
  - 32 seat, 1 drawing room, parlor, buffet, observation car #450 Peoria
- The Des Moines Rocket, Chicago, Illinois to Des Moines, Iowa
  - Articulated 3 car set:
    - 32 seat Baggage-dinette-coach #401 Norman Judd
    - 60 seat coach #307 Grenville Dodge
    - 76 seat coach #301 Henry Farnum
  - 32 seat, 1 drawing room, parlor, buffet, observation car #451 L M Allen

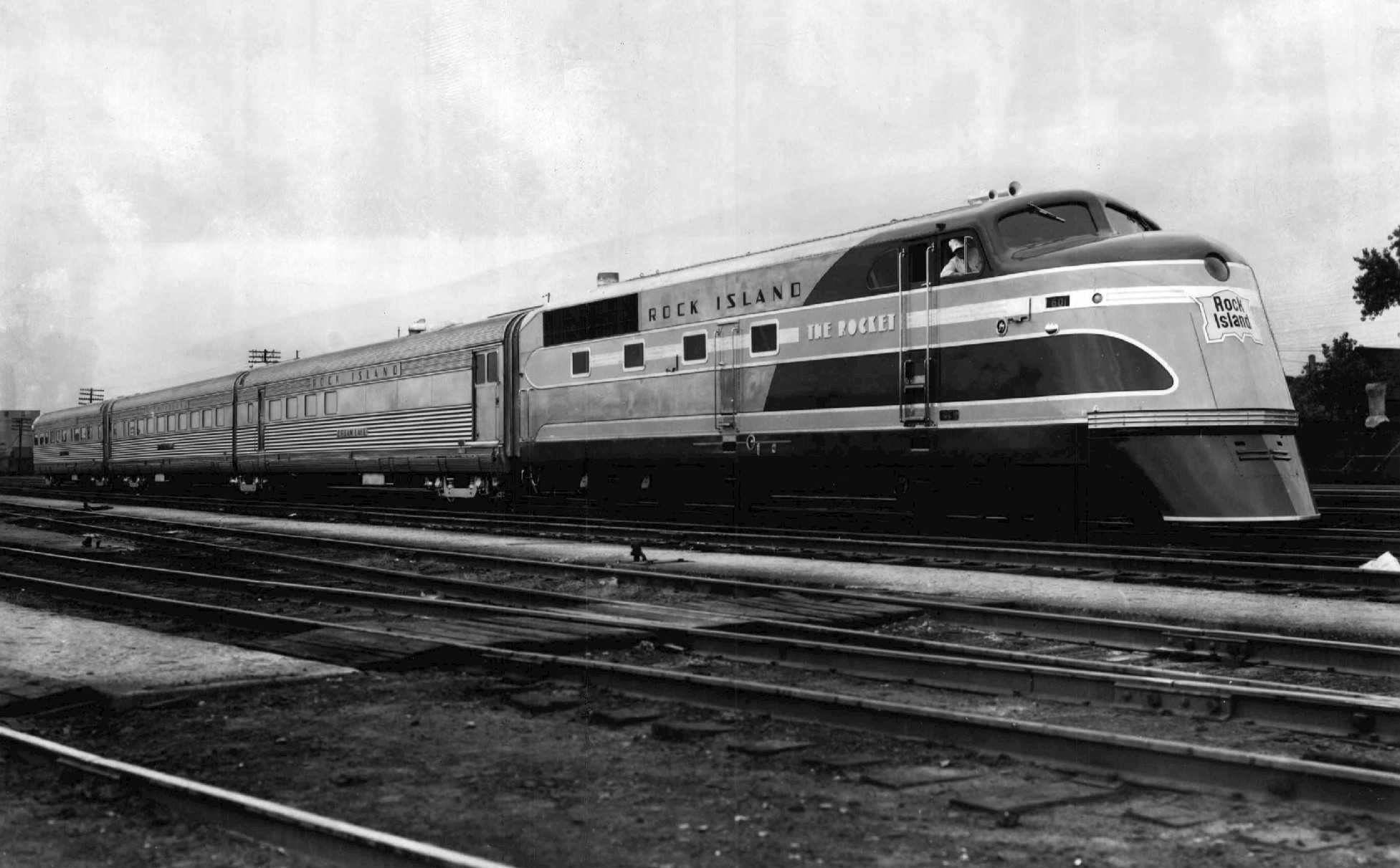
Texas Rocket

- The Texas Rocket, Fort Worth, Texas to Houston, Texas, offering an alternate schedule on the route of the Sam Houston Zephyr
  - Articulated 2 car set:
    - 32 seat Baggage-dinette-coach #402 Dream Lake
    - 76 seat coach #302 Mesa Verde
  - 28 seat coach, lounge, observation car #452 Centennial

Denver Rocket, east of Denver, Colorado, November 25, 1937

- The Denver Rocket, Kansas City, Missouri to Denver, Colorado for less than a year, then The Rocket from Kansas City to Oklahoma City, Oklahoma from March, 1938
  - Articulated 2 car set:
    - 32 seat Baggage-dinette-coach #403 Bear Lake
    - 76 seat coach #303 Mount Evans
  - 28 seat coach, lounge, observation car #453 Pikes Peak

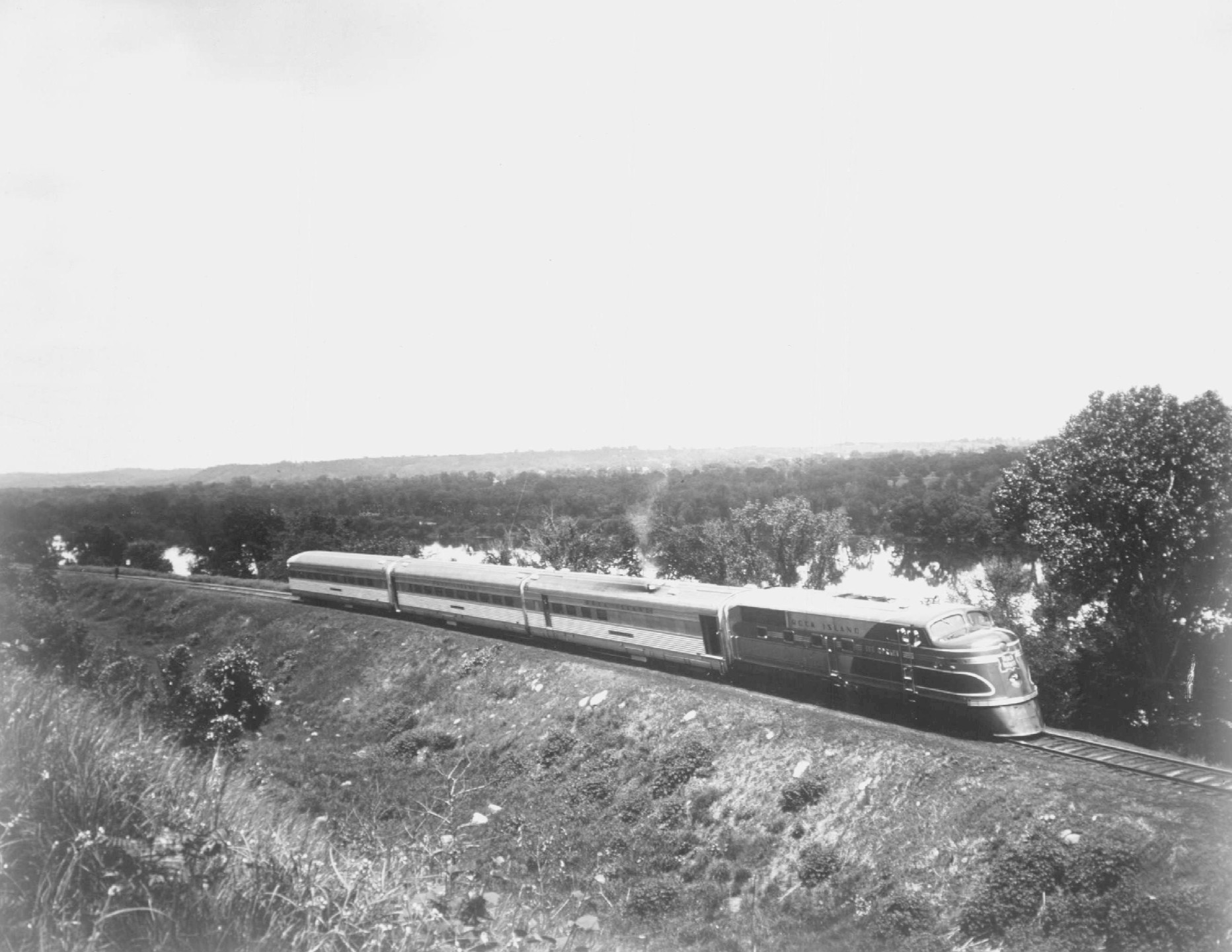
Kansas City Rocket

- The Kansas City Rocket, Minneapolis, Minnesota to Kansas City, Missouri (2 trainsets)
  - Articulated 2 car set:
    - 18 seat Baggage-dinette-coach #404 Arrow Head
    - 76 seat coach #304 Chippewa
  - 28 seat coach, lounge, observation car #454 Minnesota
  - Articulated 2 car set:
    - 18 seat Baggage-dinette-coach #405 Mesabi
    - 76 seat coach #305 Ioway
  - 28 seat coach, lounge, observation car #455 Missouri
