= Southern Pacific GS-4 class =

Class of 28 American 4-8-4 locomotives

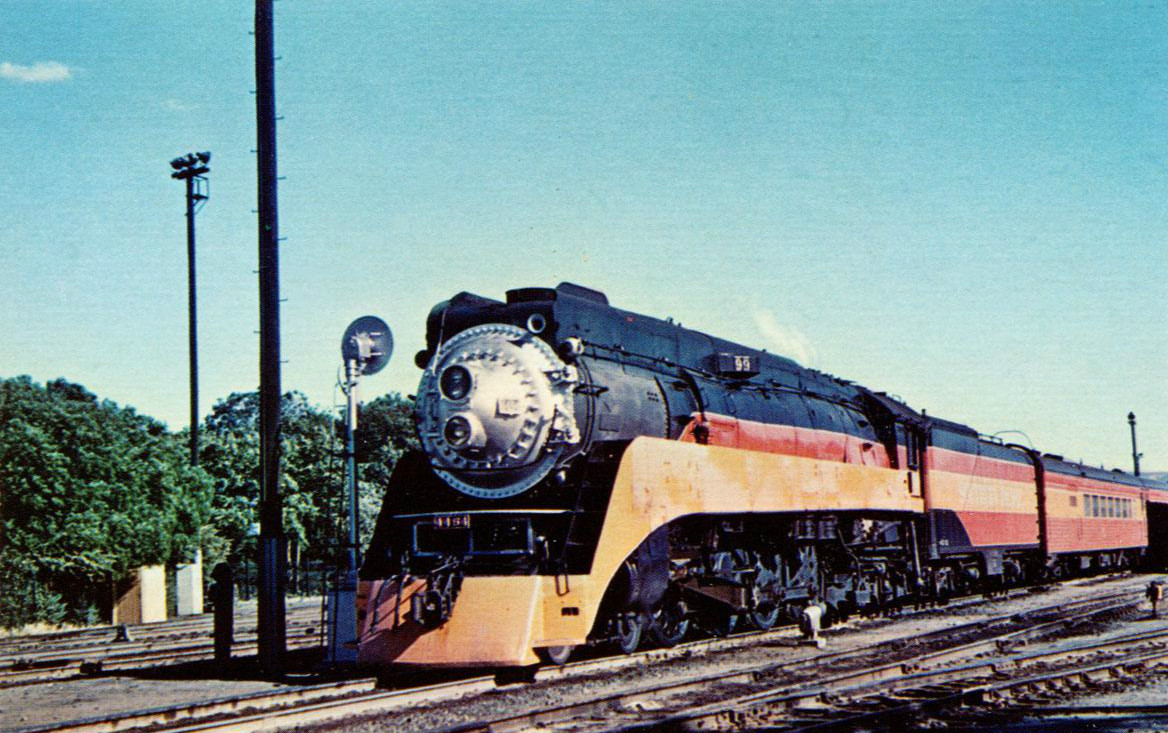
- No. 4454 pulling the Coast Daylight train No. 99 in San Jose, California, 1954.
Type and origin
- Power type: Steam
- Builder: Lima Locomotive Works
- Serial number: 7798–7817, 7848–7855
- Build date: March–May 1941 (20), March–April 1942 (8)
- Total produced: 28
Specifications
- Configuration
  - Whyte: 4-8-4
  - UIC: 2′D2′ h2
- Gauge: 4 ft 8 1/2 in (1,435 mm) standard gauge
- Leading dia.: 36 in (914 mm)
- Driver dia.: 80 in (2,032 mm)
- Trailing dia.: 45 1/2 in (1,156 mm)
- Wheelbase: 88.23 ft (26.89 m)
- Height: 16 ft 4 in (4.98 m)
- Axle load: 69,000 lb (31,000 kg; 31 t)
- Adhesive weight: 275,700 lb (125,100 kg; 125.1 t)
- Loco weight: 475,000 lb (215,000 kg; 215 t)
- Total weight: 870,600 lb (394,900 kg; 394.9 t)
- Fuel type: Oil
- Fuel capacity: 5,880 US gal (22,300 L; 4,900 imp gal)
- Water cap.: 23,500 US gal (89,000 L; 19,600 imp gal)
- Firebox
  - Grate area: 90.4 sq ft (8.40 m^{2})
- Boiler pressure: 300 psi (2.07 MPa)
- Heating surface
  - Firebox: 385 sq ft (35.8 m^{2})
  - Total surface: 4,887 sq ft (454.0 m^{2})
- Superheater
  - Heating area: 2,086 sq ft (193.8 m^{2})
- Cylinders: Two, outside
- Cylinder size: 25 1/2 in × 32 in (648 mm × 813 mm)
- Valve gear: Walschaerts
- Valve type: Piston
- Loco brake: Air
- Train brakes: Air
Performance figures
- Maximum speed: 120 mph (190 km/h)
- Tractive effort: Engine: 64,800 lbf (288.24 kN); Booster: 13,850 lbf (61.61 kN); Total: 78,650 lbf (349.85 kN)
Career
- Operators: Southern Pacific
- Class: GS-4
- Numbers: 4430–4457
- First run: April 1941
- Retired: 1956-1958
- Preserved: No. 4449 operational in excursion service
- Scrapped: 1956-1959
- Disposition: One preserved, remainder scrapped

The Southern Pacific GS-4 is a class of semi-streamlined 4-8-4 "Northern" type steam locomotive operated by the Southern Pacific Railroad (SP) from 1941 to 1958. A total of 28 locomotives were built by Lima Locomotive Works (LLW) in Lima, Ohio, with the first batch of 20 built between March and May 1941, and the second batch of eight built between March and April 1942. The initials GS stands for Golden State or General Service.

The GS-4s served as the primary motive power of SP's flagship Coast Daylight passenger train between San Francisco and Los Angeles, California, via San Luis Obispo, California. They also haul the San Joaquin Daylight, which ran between San Francisco and Los Angeles through the Central Valley and Tehachapi Pass. The locomotives pulled other passenger trains out of Los Angeles to Tucumcari, New Mexico on the Golden State Route and to New Orleans, Louisiana on the Sunset Route. Some of the them were first assigned to haul troop trains during World War II.

In the mid-1950s, SP began to modernize their mainline passenger trains with diesel power, and the GS-4s were relegated to haul San Jose-San Francisco commuter trains and general freight trains. By 1956, SP began to retire their GS-4s and all but one were scrapped by 1959. No. 4449 was donated to the city of Portland, Oregon, as a static display during 1958 until being restored to operating condition in the 1970s. It is still operational and is now based at the Oregon Rail Heritage Center in Portland.

== History ==
=== Locomotives ===
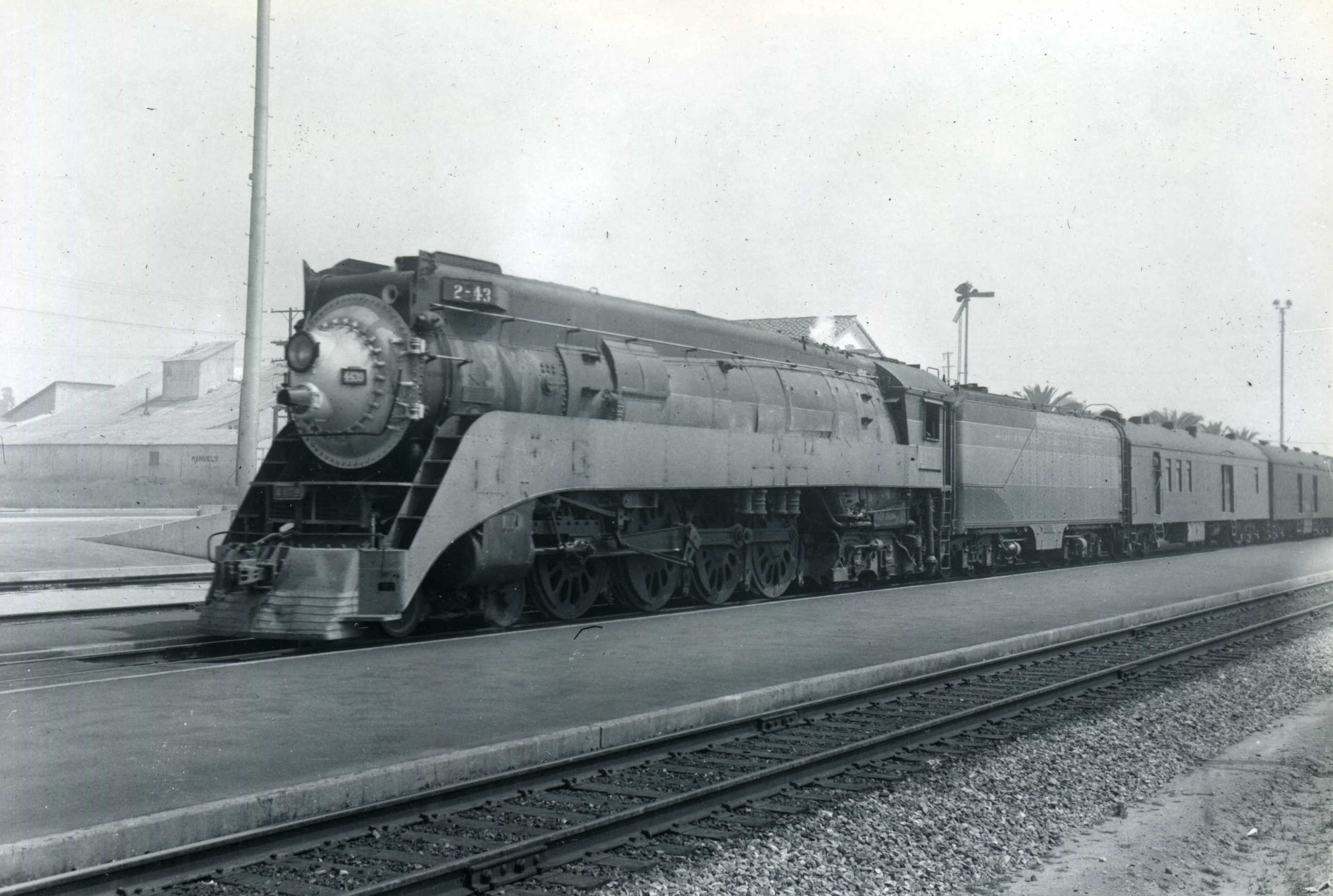
No. 4439 pulling the Californian train No. 43 in the mid-1940s.

The Southern Pacific (SP) GS-4s were built to a similar design of the streamlined GS-3s, although the latter have the mars light mounted in a dual-headlight casing above the headlight in front of the smokebox door, and an all-weather cab. They were built in two separate groups, the first batch of twenty locomotives (Nos. 4430-4449) in March-May 1941 and the final eight (Nos. 4450-4457) in March-April 1942. The GS-4s were capable of reaching 120 mph (190 km/h), although SP had a speed limit restriction of 79 mph (127 km/h). They carried the signature SP orange and red Daylight paint scheme.

The GS-4s primarily pulled SP's San Francisco-Los Angeles passenger trains such as the Morning Daylight/Coast Daylight, the Noon Daylight, the Coast Passenger, and the Lark, all of which ran through the SP's Coast Line. They also ran another San Francisco-Los Angeles passenger train called the San Joaquin Daylight, which ran over the San Joaquin Valley Line through the San Joaquin Valley and Tehachapi Pass. On the Sunset Route, the locomotives pulled the Argonaut and the Sunset Limited between Los Angeles and New Orleans, Louisiana. The GS-4s pulled other passenger trains such as the Californian, the Golden State Limited, and the Imperial on the Sunset Route out of Los Angeles to El Paso, Texas, where they traversed to the Golden State Route to Tucumcari, New Mexico for the Rock Island Line (RI) completing the three trains' journey to Chicago, Illinois.

During wartime and until 1948 some of the GS-4 locomotives were painted black, when they were all returned to their Daylight colors. Sometime after that and before 1956 most were painted black again with their side skirts removed for easier maintenance, and were reassigned to the San Jose-San Francisco Peninsula Commute service, freight service, and the occasional San Joaquin Daylight (steam locomotives remained on that train as late as 1956, which made it the last streamliner to be pulled by steam on the Southern Pacific) until they were replaced by diesel locomotives. GS-4 No. 4443 pulled one of the final steam excursions on the Southern Pacific in 1957. A GS-4 pulled its last passenger train in October 1958, and they were all retired by the end of the year.

GS-4 locomotive details
Road number	Built date	Serial number	First run date	Retirement date	Disposal date	Notes
4430	March 1941	7798	April 11, 1941	September 24, 1958	July 13, 1959	Sold for scrap at Luria Brothers in South San Francisco, California.
4431	March 1941	7799	April 15, 1941	September 24, 1958	March 25, 1959	Sold for scrap at California Metals.
4432	April 1941	7800	April 28, 1941	May 14, 1956	September 14, 1956	Scrapped in Los Angeles, California.
4433	April 1941	7801	April 19, 1941	October 5, 1956	November 15, 1956	Sold for scrap at Purdy Company in South San Francisco, California.
4434	April 1941	7802	April 19, 1941	May 14, 1956	October 12, 1956	Sold for scrap in Los Angeles, California.
4435	April 1941	7803	April 26, 1941	October 18, 1956	December 13, 1956	Sold for scrap at Luria Brothers in South San Francisco, California.
4436	April 1941	7804	April 28, 1941	May 2, 1957	July 1, 1957	Sold for scrap at California Metals.
4437	April 1941	7805	April 29, 1941	September 24, 1958	July 17, 1959	Sold for scrap to National Metals in Los Angeles. One of its driving wheels remained on No. 4449 today.
4438	April 1941	7806	May 1, 1941	December 26, 1956	February 7, 1957	Scrapped in Sacramento, California
4439	April 1941	7807	May 3, 1941	May 21, 1958	March 23, 1959	Sold for scrap to National Metals in Los Angeles, California.
4440	April 1941	7808	May 6, 1941	September 27, 1956	October 31, 1956	Sold for scrap at Luria Brothers in Richmond, California.
4441	April 1941	7809	May 6, 1941	September 24, 1958	July 17, 1959	Sold for scrap to National Metals in Los Angeles, California.
4442	April 1941	7810	May 10, 1941	May 14, 1956	May 31, 1956	Sold for scrap to National Metals in Los Angeles, California.
4443	April 1941	7811	May 15, 1941	September 24, 1958	October 31, 1958	Used for one of the final SP steam excursions in 1957, sold for scrap at California Metals. Its pilot truck remained on No. 4449 today.
4444	April 1941	7812	May 18, 1941	September 24, 1958	August 7, 1959	Sold for scrap at Purdy Company in South San Francisco, California. It was the last GS-4 to be scrapped. Its tender was rebuilt in 1960-1961 by SP and used as a "hammer car" to test impacts on freight cars with hydra-cushion frames; it was scrapped in 1972.
4445	May 1941	7813	May 21, 1941	September 24, 1958	March 23, 1959	Sold for scrap to National Metals in Los Angeles, California.
4446	May 1941	7814	May 21, 1941	September 24, 1958	November 3, 1958	Sold for scrap at Purdy Company in South San Francisco, California.
4447	May 1941	7815	May 27, 1941	May 14, 1956	June 6, 1956	Sold for scrap to National Metals in Los Angeles.
4448	May 1941	7816	May 27, 1941	December 26, 1956	January 24, 1957	Sold for scrap at Luria Brothers in South San Francisco, California.
4449	May 1941	7817	May 30, 1941	October 2, 1957	April 24, 1958	Donated to the City of Portland, Oregon for static display. Re-equipped with roller bearings in 1984. Operational at the Oregon Rail Heritage Center.
4450	March 1942	7848	March 27, 1942	September 24, 1958	October 29, 1958	Sold for scrap at Purdy Company in Los Angeles, California. Its trailing truck remained on No. 4449 today.
4451	March 1942	7849	March 31, 1942	September 24, 1958	March 25, 1959	Sold for scrap at Purdy Company in Los Angeles, California.
4452	March 1942	7850	April 4, 1942	October 18, 1956	March 25, 1959	Sold for scrap at Luria Brothers in Richmond, California.
4453	March 1942	7851	April 4, 1942	February 7, 1957	March 14, 1957	Sold for scrap at Luria Brothers in South San Francisco, California.
4454	March 1942	7852	April 14, 1942	May 2, 1957	August 7, 1957	Sold for scrap at Luria Brothers in South San Francisco, California.
4455	April 1942	7853	May 4, 1942	September 24, 1958	March 23, 1959	Sold for scrap to National Metals in Los Angeles.
4456	April 1942	7854	May 6, 1942	December 26, 1956	February 8, 1957	Sold for scrap at Luria Brothers in South San Francisco, California.
4457	April 1942	7855	May 9, 1942	June 12, 1956	July 18, 1956	Sold for scrap at Luria Brothers in Richmond, California.

=== Accidents and incidents ===
- On September 19, 1941, at about 1:50 A.M., No. 4441 made an unscheduled stop at Wellsona, California, near Paso Robles, California, with the southbound Lark train No. 76 due to a stalled automobile. However, No. 4446 was approaching Wellsona with the Fast Merchandise freight train No. 374 and crashed into the back of the Lark train, injuring 48 people. It was reported that the accident was caused by a failure to provide flag protection for the first train and the second train's freight cars lacked high-speed brakes, as well as too short a stopping distance between block signals. No. 4441 was undamaged, while No. 4446 was repaired, and both locomotives continued service until 1958.
- On February 11, 1945, in Redlands, California, at 9:45 A.M., No. 4443 was pulling the Californian passenger train No. 43, but its engineer failed to acknowledge the yellow signal, and crashed head-on at 40 mph (64 km/h) into SP 4-10-2 locomotive No. 5015, which was being prepared to move into a siding to allow No. 4443 to pass. The accident injured 177 people. Both locomotives were repaired and continued service.
- In 1952, No. 4430, the first of the GS-4 class, was involved in a rollover accident in Arizona, but was repaired and continued service until 1958.

== Preservation ==
No. 4449 is the sole surviving GS-4 locomotive and is one of the most recognizable locomotives of all time. It was donated to the City of Portland, Oregon in 1958 and moved to Oaks Amusement Park for static display. During its time at Oaks Park, the locomotive was vandalized and had many of its external parts stolen such as its builder's plate and whistle. On December 14, 1974, No. 4449 was removed from the park to undergo an operational restoration, performed by Doyle McCormack. From August 1975 to December 1976, No. 4449 shared duties with several other steam locomotives pulling the American Freedom Train (that train was pulled by Reading T-1 2101) throughout the U.S. No. 4449 is still operational and since mid-2012 resides at the Oregon Rail Heritage Center in Portland along with other preserved locomotives and rolling stock. Additionally, No. 4449 contained most of its sister locomotives' parts; one of the driving wheels from No. 4437, the pilot truck from No. 4443, and the trailing truck from No. 4450, as evidenced by the numbers stamped on each of the parts. This was made during the SP steam era, whenever No. 4449 and the GS-4s were getting overhauls during recent visits at one of SP's locomotive workshops, the shop crew would have to interchange their parts whether they were missing or still being worked on.

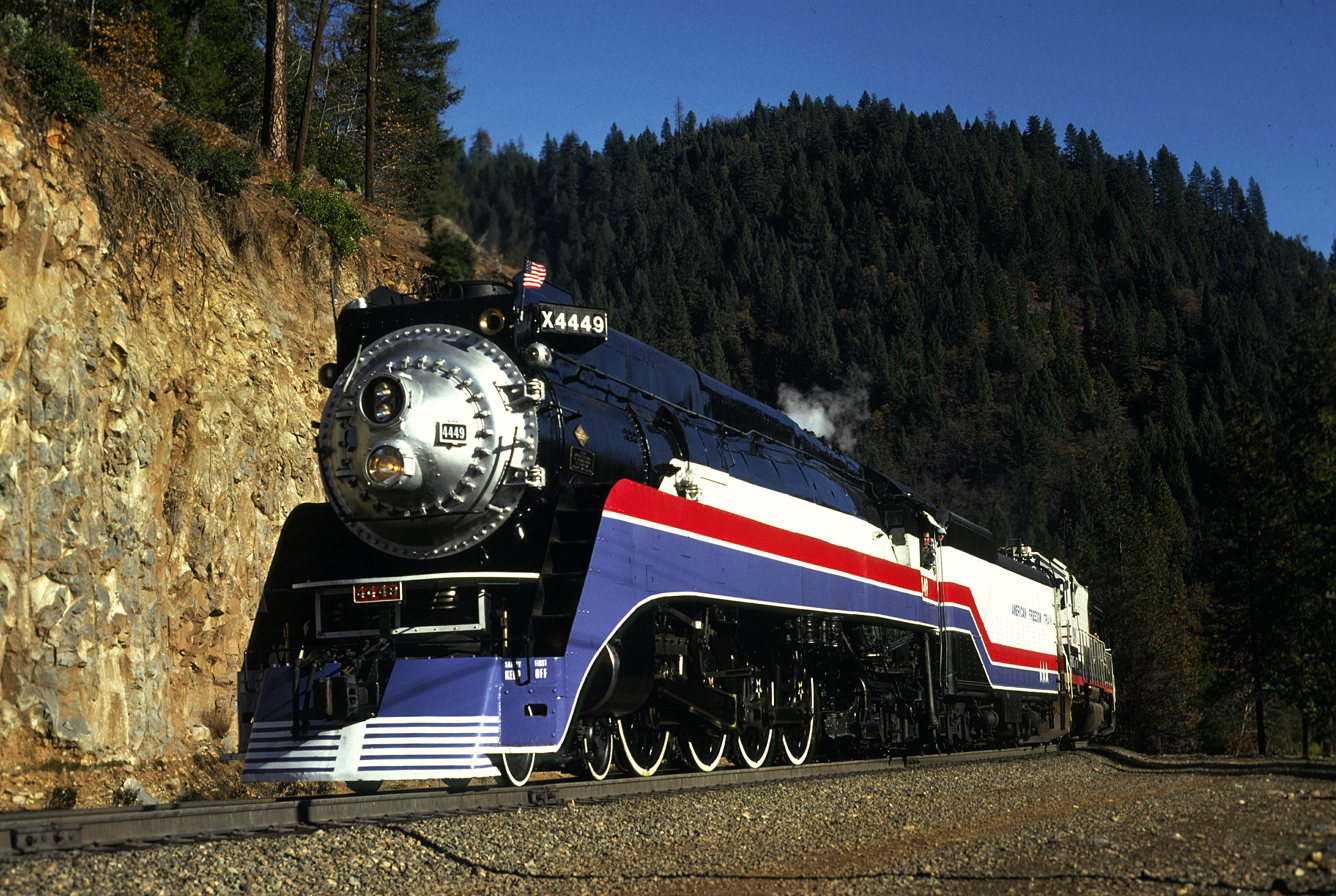
No. 4449 pulling the American Freedom Train near the Soda Mountains in 1975

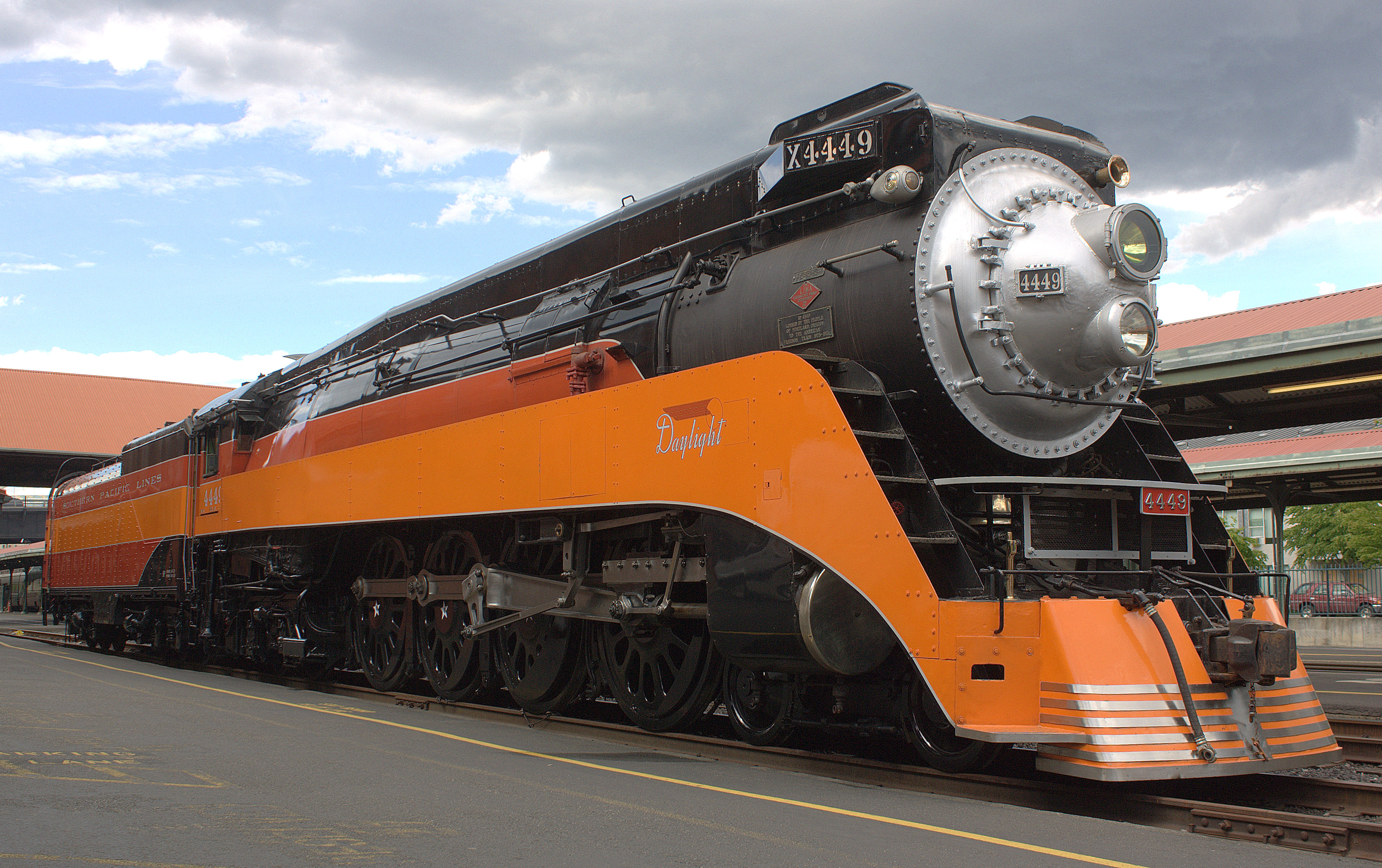
Southern Pacific No. 4449 under steam at Portland Union Station in 2010

== In film ==
- A GS-4 class streamliner appears in The Narrow Margin (1950), bound from Chicago to Los Angeles, as a central character in the film.
- No. 4443 appeared in the opening credits of the 1957 Frank Sinatra film Pal Joey.
- No. 4446 appeared in the Season 6 episode "Operation Tiger" of Hogan's Heroes which initially aired November 29, 1970. The footage was likely re-use from stock filmed in the 1950's given that all GS-4s were retired by 1958. In one brief scene, the locomotive's numerals under the cab can be seen along with a portion of the "Southern Pacific" on the tender, but the image is reversed (likely to obscure that a US locomotive was being used for a "German" Train) while in another scene, no clear identification of the specific locomotive is seen, but it is clearly a GS-4 class. Short of watching the episode, there is no obvious citation of this info readily available.
- No. 4449 was featured in the 1986 Burt Lancaster-Kirk Douglas action comedy Tough Guys as the Gold Coast Flyer. In the film, No. 4449 is hijacked and run off the end of the track across the Mexican border. A full-size wooden replica of the locomotive was used to shoot the crash scene.
- No. 4449 appeared in the 1990 drama film Come See the Paradise.
- No. 4449 was featured in the 2022 IMAX film Train Time.

== See also ==
- Cotton Belt Class L-1

== Bibliography ==
- Johnsen, Kenneth G. (2006). Southern Pacific Daylight Steam Locomotives (1st ed.). Specialty Press. ISBN 978-1-58007-098-0.
- Solomon, Brian (2005). Southern Pacific Passenger Trains (1st ed.). MBI. ISBN 0-7603-1795-X.
