= Southern Pacific 4449 =

Preserved SP GS-4 class 4-8-4 locomotive in Portland, Oregon

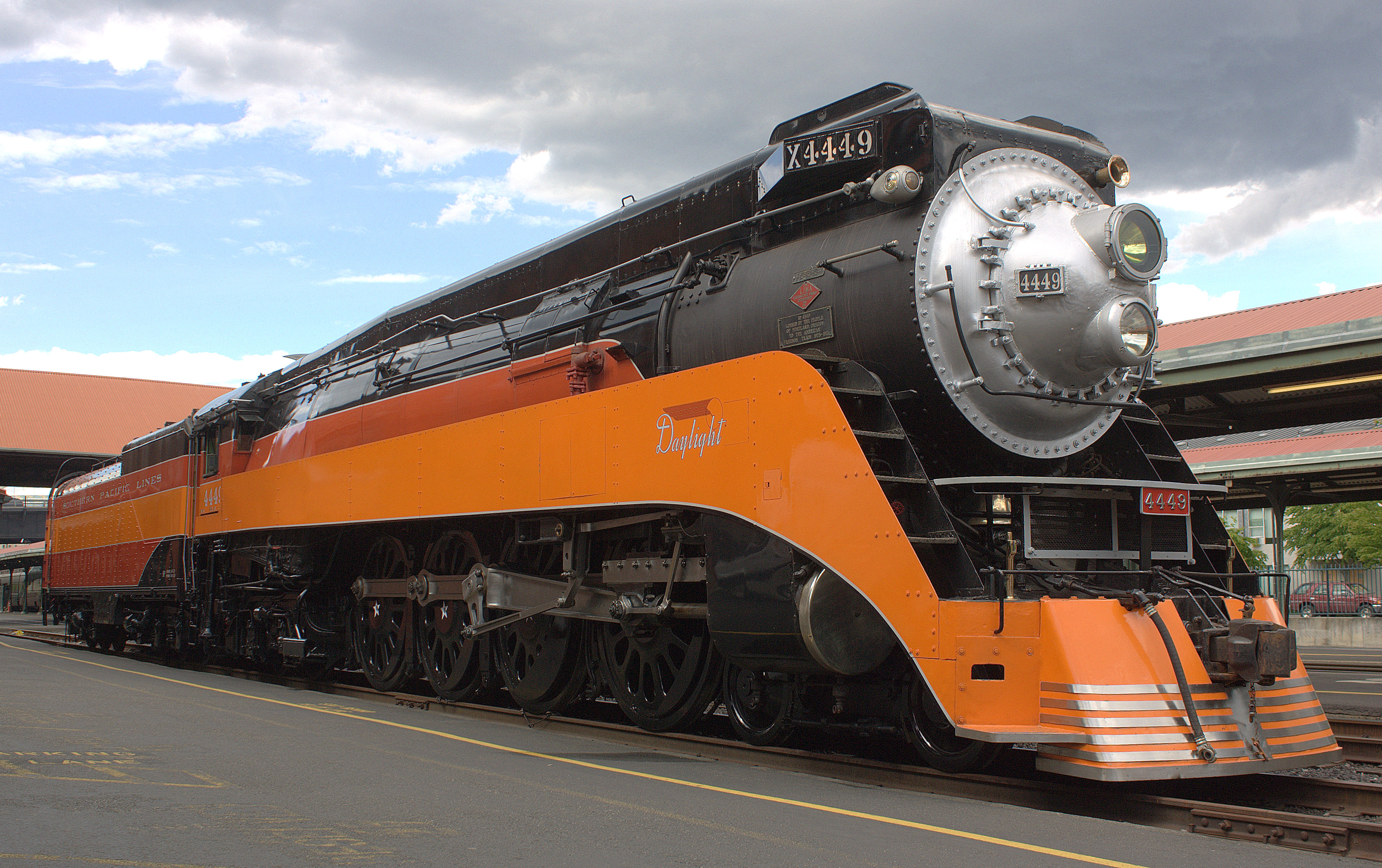
- Southern Pacific No. 4449 at Portland Union Station on May 7, 2010
Type and origin
- Power type: Steam
- Builder: Lima Locomotive Works
- Serial number: 7817
- Build date: May 20, 1941
Specifications
- Configuration
  - Whyte: 4-8-4
- Gauge: 4 ft 8 1/2 in (1,435 mm) standard gauge
- Leading dia.: 36 in (914 mm)
- Driver dia.: 80 in (2,032 mm)
- Trailing dia.: 45 1/2 in (1,156 mm)
- Length: 110 ft (34 m)
- Width: 10 ft (3 m)
- Height: 16 ft 4 in (4.98 m)
- Adhesive weight: 275,700 lb (125,100 kg)
- Loco weight: 475,000 lb (215,000 kg)
- Tender weight: 395,600 lb (179,400 kg)
- Total weight: 870,600 lb (394,900 kg)
- Fuel type: Oil
- Fuel capacity: 6,275 gal
- Water cap.: 23,500 gal
- Firebox
  - Grate area: 90.4 sq ft (8.40 m^{2})
- Boiler pressure: 300 psi (2.07 MPa)
- Heating surface: 4,887 sq ft (454.0 m^{2})
- Superheater
  - Heating area: 2,086 sq ft (193.8 m^{2})
- Cylinders: Two, outside
- Cylinder size: 25.5 in × 32 in (648 mm × 813 mm) dia × stroke
- Valve gear: Walschaerts
- Valve type: Piston valves
- Loco brake: Air
- Train brakes: Air
- Couplers: Knuckle
Performance figures
- Maximum speed: 120 mph (190 km/h)
- Tractive effort: Engine: 64,800 lbf (288.24 kN); Booster: 13,850 lbf (61.61 kN); Total: 78,650 lbf (349.85 kN)
- Factor of adh.: 4.16; 4.286 with booster
Career
- Operators: Southern Pacific Railroad; Oregon Rail Heritage Center; BNSF Railway (Employee Event only)
- Class: GS-4
- Number in class: 28
- Numbers: SP 4449; AFT 4449; PNWR 4449; WPR 4449; BNSF 4449; UPY 845
- Nicknames: The Daylight; The Queen of Steam
- First run: May 30, 1941
- Last run: September 24, 1956
- Retired: October 2, 1957
- Preserved: April 24, 1958
- Restored: April 21, 1975
- Current owner: The City of Portland, Oregon
- Disposition: Operational

Southern Pacific 4449, also known as the Daylight, is a GS-4 class 4-8-4 "Northern" type steam locomotive. It is the only surviving example of the Southern Pacific Railroad's GS-4 class steam locomotives and one of only two streamlined GS class locomotives preserved, the other being GS-6 No. 4460 at the National Museum of Transportation in St. Louis, Missouri. GS is an abbreviation of General Service or Golden State, the latter of which was a nickname for California, where the locomotive was used to operate in revenue service.

No. 4449 was built by Lima Locomotive Works (LLW) in Lima, Ohio for the Southern Pacific Railroad on May 20, 1941; it received SP's signature red-and-orange Daylight paint scheme for the passenger trains of the same name which it hauled for most of its service career. No. 4449 was retired from revenue service on October 2, 1957, and donated to the City of Portland, Oregon in 1958. The city then put the locomotive on static display near Oaks Amusement Park at "Oaks Pioneer Park", where it remained until 1974.

No. 4449 was restored to operation for use in the American Freedom Train, which toured the 48 contiguous United States as part of the nation's 1976 Bicentennial celebration. The locomotive has operated in excursion service since 1984.

The locomotive's operations are now based at the Oregon Rail Heritage Center in Portland, Oregon where it is maintained by a non-profit group of volunteers named "The Friends of SP 4449". In 1983, a poll of Trains magazine readers selected No. 4449 as being the most popular locomotive in the United States.

== History ==
=== Revenue service ===
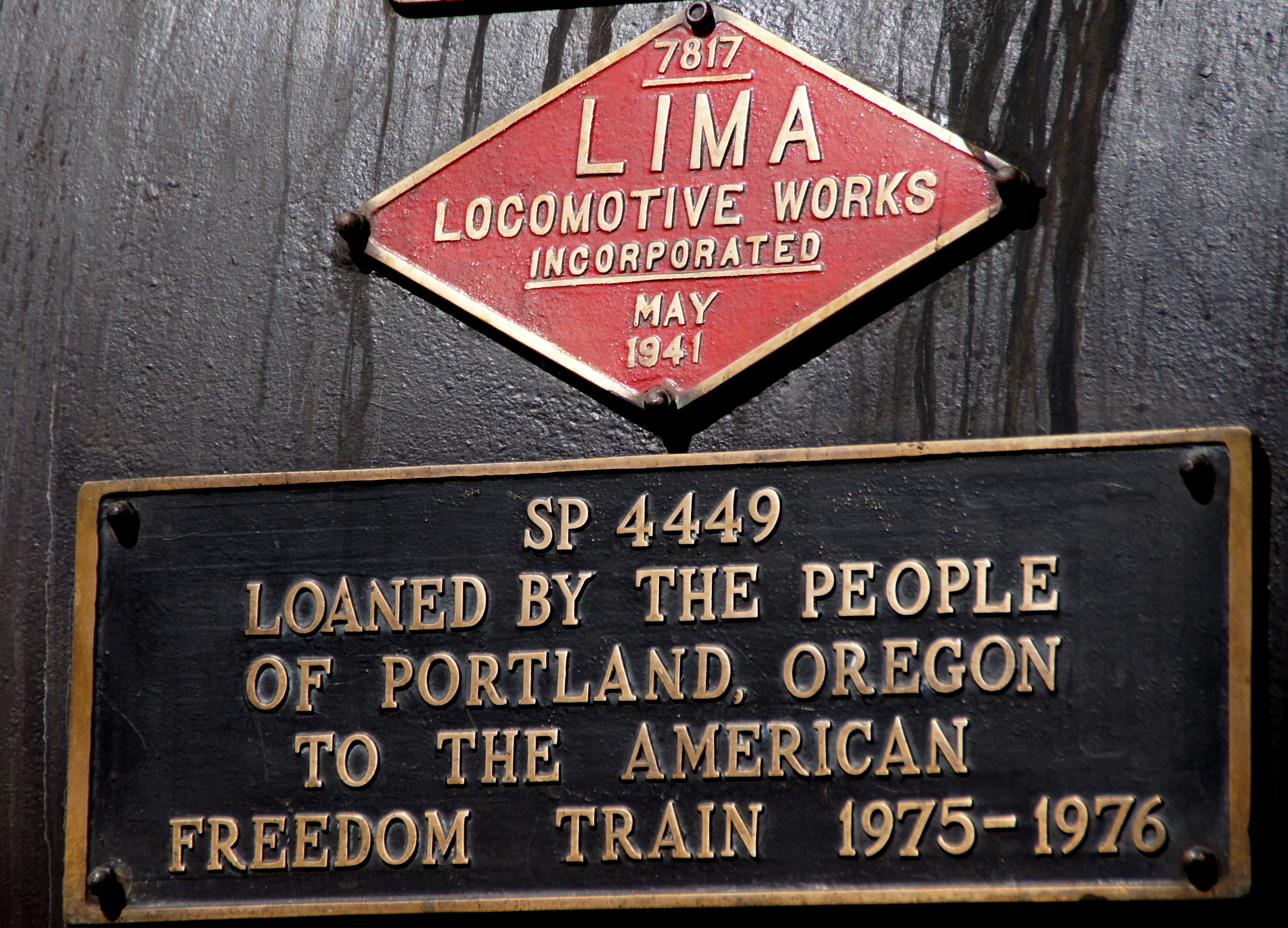
No. 4449's builder's plate and American Freedom Train plaque

A total of 28 locomotives were built by Lima Locomotive Works (LLW) in Lima, Ohio, with the first batch of 20 built between March and May 1941. No. 4449 was the last member of the Southern Pacific Railroad's (SP) first order of GS-4 locomotives. No. 4449 was placed into service on May 30, 1941, and spent its early career assigned to the Coast Daylight, the SP's flagship passenger train, which ran on the SP Coast Line between San Francisco and Los Angeles, California. It also pulled many of SP's other named passenger trains on the Coast Line such as the Coast Mail/Passenger, and the Lark.

After the arrival of newer GS-4s and GS-5s in 1942, No. 4449 pulled the Argonaut and the Sunset Limited on the Sunset Route between Los Angeles and New Orleans, Louisiana. It also pull the Californian, the Golden State, and the Imperial from Los Angeles to El Paso, Texas, where it traverse to the Golden State Route ran on the Golden State Route to Tucumcari, New Mexico for the Rock Island Line (RI) to finished the three trains' journey to Chicago, Illinois. In the early 1950s, No. 4449 was reassigned to the Coast Division.

On October 17, 1954, No. 4449 and its sister locomotive No. 4447 pulled a special Railway and Locomotive Historical Society excursion from Los Angeles to Owenyo, California, and return. In late 1955, after being one of the last few steam engines in Daylight livery, No. 4449 was painted black and silver and its side skirting (a streamlining feature of the Daylight steam engines) was removed, as no longer needed due to dieselization of the Coast Daylight in January of that year and also for easier maintenance after steam locomotives prove to be very expensive to maintain.

No. 4449 was then assigned to the SP's San Joaquin Valley line, occasionally pulling passenger trains such as the San Joaquin Daylight between Oakland and Bakersfield as well as fast freight and helper service. No. 4449 was semi-retired from service on September 24, 1956, and was kept as an emergency back-up locomotive until it was officially retired on October 2, 1957, and was stored along with several other GS-class engines at the SP's Bakersfield roundhouse.

=== On static display ===
In 1958, when most of the GS class engines had already been scrapped, No. 4449 was removed from storage and donated to Portland, Oregon on April 24, 1958, where it was placed on outdoor public display near Oaks Park at "Oaks Pioneer Park".

While on display at "Oaks Pioneer Park", No. 4449 was repeatedly vandalized and had many of its external parts stolen, including its builder's plates and whistle. As a result, the locomotive quickly deteriorated. However, Jack Holst, a Southern Pacific employee and member of the Pacific Northwest Chapter of the National Railway Historical Society, looked after No. 4449 along with two other steam locomotives, Spokane, Portland and Seattle 700 and Oregon Railroad and Navigation 197. Holst kept their bearings and rods oiled in case they were ever to move again. Holst died in 1972 and did not get to see his efforts come to fruition with No. 4449 returning to operation three years later in the spring of 1975.

=== American Freedom Train ===
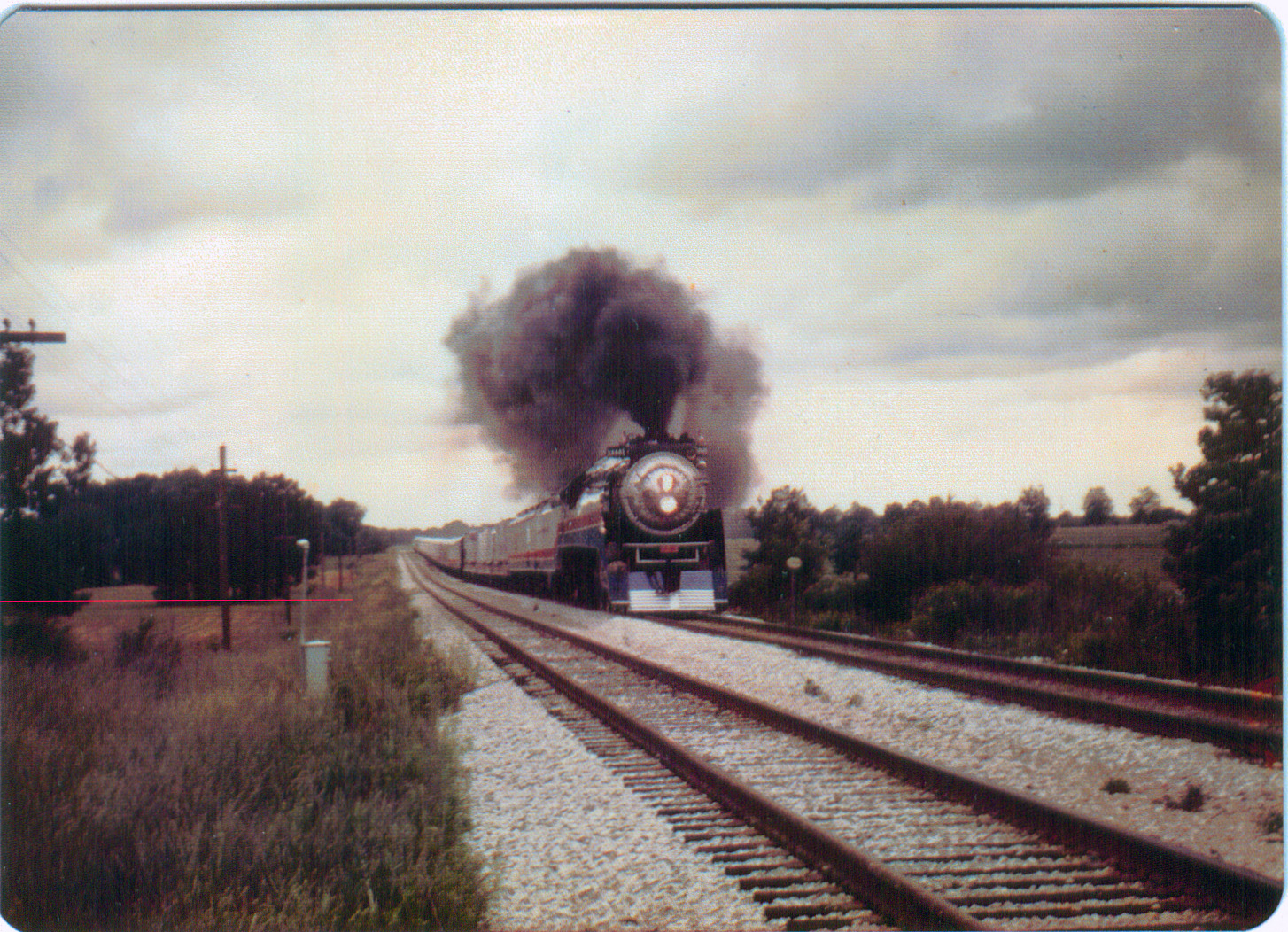
No. 4449 pulling the American Freedom Train in Georgia in late 1976

In 1974, No. 4449 was evaluated for restoration after becoming a candidate to pull the American Freedom Train, as its size, power and streamlining made it a good fit for the Bicentennial train. After the evaluators determined that 4449's bearings and rods remained in good condition, they selected the locomotive for that task.

No. 4449 was removed from display on December 13 and was restored at the Burlington Northern Railroad's Hoyt Street roundhouse in Portland. The locomotive returned to operation on April 21, 1975, wearing a special paint scheme of red, white and blue.

As part of the American Freedom Train, No. 4449 pulled the display train through most of the contiguous United States. No. 4449 only pulled the Freedom Train in the Western portions of the country, whereas in the Eastern portions of the train were pulled by Reading No. 2101, which had recently been restored by Ross Rowland, and in Texas, the train was pulled by Texas and Pacific No. 610. No. 4449 pulled the American Freedom Train for a total of 82 of 138 stops, in 38 states, for the Bicentennial event.

After the train's tour ended, No. 4449 pulled an excursion sponsored by Amtrak, dubbed the Amtrak Transcontinental Steam Excursion between January and May 1977. While the locomotive was in Birmingham, Alabama, it participated in a photoshoot with No. 610, Southern Railway 722 and Southern Railway 4501. After nearly two years on the road, the locomotive was returned to storage in Portland, this time under protective cover and not exposed to the elements. (Note: Shortly before the American Freedom Train tours ended, the Southern Railway offered to lease No. 4449 for use in their steam excursion program, since they were in need of a larger steam locomotive to haul their longer consists. Since the Freedom Train foundation was obligated to return No. 4449 to Oregon after the tours, they had to decline the lease offer, but they instead recommended Texas and Pacific 610.)

=== Excursion service ===
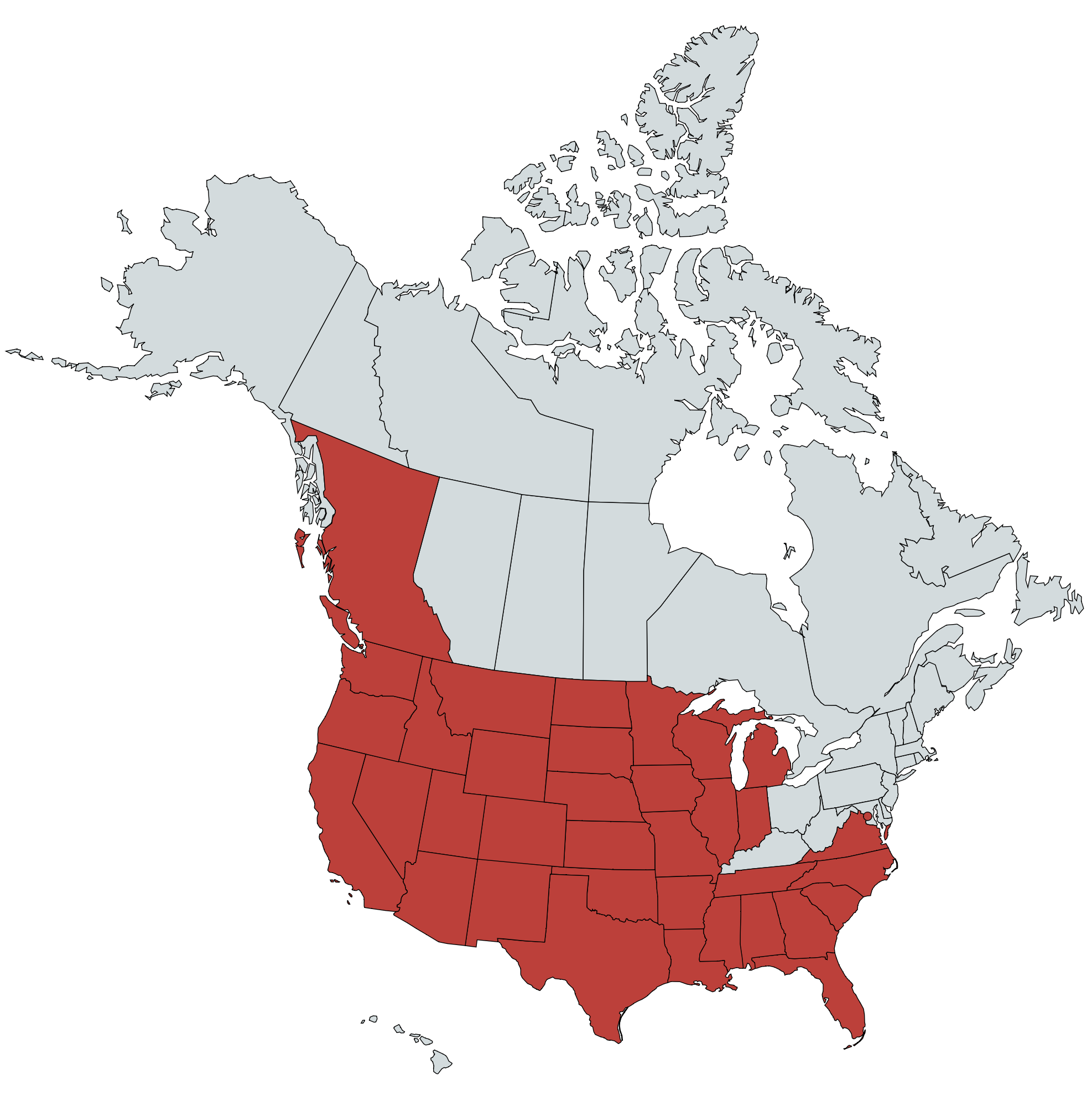
Canadian provinces and US states visited by No. 4449 in excursion service

In 1981, No. 4449 was returned to its original Daylight colors for Railfair '81 and the opening of the California State Railroad Museum in Sacramento, California, along with Union Pacific Nos. 844 (8444) and 3985. Prior to this trip, a Southern Pacific 6-chime whistle from a cab-forward type locomotive was mounted on the fireman's side and would remain on the locomotive throughout most trips in the 1980s. In 1984, No. 4449 pulled an all-Daylight-painted train from Portland via Los Angeles to New Orleans, Louisiana and back, to publicize the World's Fair, with No. 8444 there too. This 7,477-mile (12,033 km) round trip was the longest steam train excursion in the history of the United States. However, this trip was not flawless. On June 11, No. 4449 was approaching Del Rio, Texas, still on its way to New Orleans, when the retention plate that holds the draw-bar pin in place somehow disconnected and fell in between the ties, allowing the tender and the entire consist to uncouple, while the locomotive accelerated all by itself. Fortunately, Doyle noticed this after checking the rear-view mirror and quickly applied the brakes. The locomotive backed up, the fallen parts were recovered, the connections were quickly repaired, and No. 4449 and the consist proceeded to run only slightly behind schedule.

In 1986, No. 4449 went to Hollywood to appear in Tough Guys and pulled business trains for the SP. (Note: That same year, Nos. 4449 and 8444 were scheduled to travel to Vancouver, British Columbia to participate in the Steam Expo event, as part of that year's World Exposition, but after Burlington Northern (BN) and Canadian Pacific both declined to allow either 4-8-4 on their trackage, their participation was cancelled at the last moment.) In 1989, Nos. 4449 and 8444 reunited and made a side-by-side entrance into Los Angeles Union Passenger Terminal in 1989 for the station's 50th-anniversary celebrations. The locomotives then ran side-by-side on the Santa Fe and the SP's parallel main lines through Cajon Pass, although No. 4449 eventually had to stop due to an axle hot box.

On April 26, 1991, No. 4449 returned to Railfair '91 in Sacramento, again with its newly restored cousin No. 2472 and Nos. 3985 and 844. It attended the next year's NRHS Convention in San Jose with No. 2472 and No. 3985. On this trip, No. 4449 carried a member's Star Brass 5-chime whistle off a CB&Q M-4 class locomotive on the fireman's side.

In 1996, No. 4449 went on a week-long special excursion, two days via BNSF north into Seattle and later Canada, a three-day layover, and two days back to Portland, just in time for Railfair '96, which celebrated Portland Union Station's 100th anniversary. Originally, this trip was supposed to have Canadian Pacific No. 2860 double-head with No. 4449 south to Portland, but it never happened. It's unknown how close the idea came to happening.

No. 4449 would again return to Railfair in Sacramento in 1999 to celebrate California's 150th anniversary, co-starring with Santa Fe No. 3751 and Nos. 844 and 3985. This was the last time she traversed the route of the Shasta Daylight, whose tracks are now owned by the UP.

In 2000, No. 4449 was repainted black and silver for a BNSF employee appreciation special. It was traditional for the SP to paint freight locomotives in black, and No. 4449 and other GS locomotives received this treatment when the diesels took over their passenger assignments. In the case of BNSF, a Class 1 freight carrier, No. 4449 was given old historical treatment. A GE C44-9W No. 4449 was lashed in to provide dynamic brakes when descending down grades. Many railfans agree it was rather humorous for BNSF to choose the C44-9W as the dynamic brake unit given its shared cab number with the 4-8-4. Following the special, the BNSF emblems were removed, and "Southern Pacific Lines" was added to the tender, a reminder of when No. 4449 was repainted to black with SP lettering in late 1955. No. 4449 was originally planned to remain in the black scheme for a few years.

No. 4449 was repainted into the American Freedom Train paint scheme again in early 2002, after the events of the September 11 attacks. In the fall of 2004, No. 4449 returned to its Daylight paint scheme, this time in its "as-delivered" appearance. It appeared in the autumn of 2004 with the then-extant Montana Rockies Rail Tours company, pulling (with a diesel helper behind it) two summer excursion trips between Sandpoint, Idaho and Billings, Montana, including stops at the Livingston Depot.

On May 18–19, 2007, No. 4449 had another appearance with No. 844 in the Pacific Northwest for the "Puget Sound Excursion", on BNSF tracks from Tacoma to Everett, Washington as a round trip.

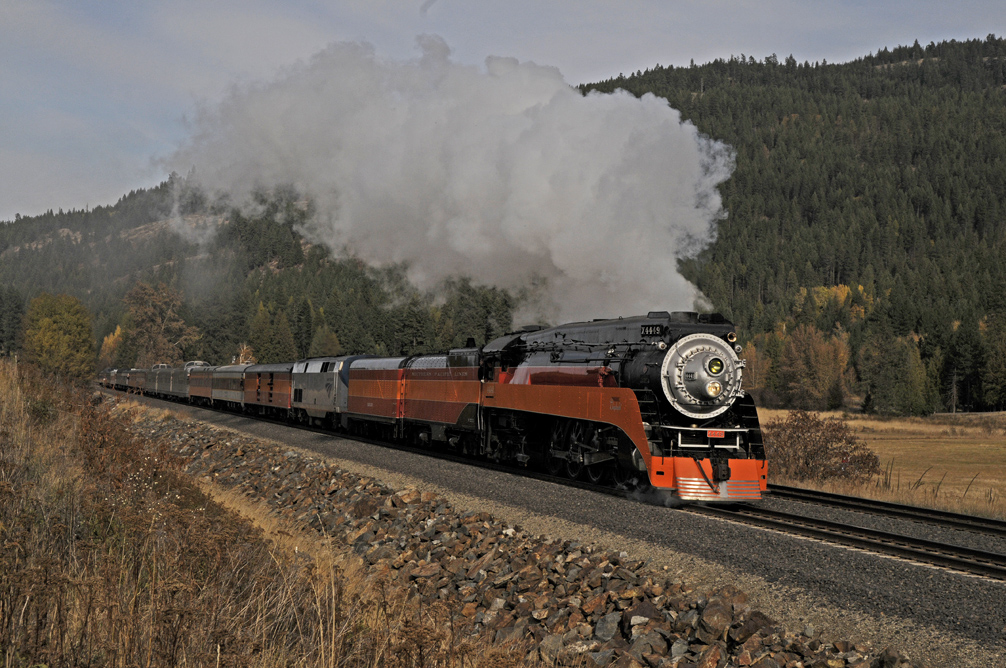
No. 4449 hauling an excursion south of Pend Orille, Idaho on October 19, 2009

On March 24, 2009, it was announced that No. 4449 would attend Train Festival 2009 in Owosso, Michigan from July 23–26 with an all-day excursion planned on the 23rd and 24th and a photo run-by planned for each trip. The locomotive was then placed on display for the rest of the event.

The historic 2,500-mile move from Portland to Owosso was arranged by the Friends of the 4449, Amtrak, the Steam Railroading Institute and the Friends of the 261. The latter loaned some of its first-class passenger cars, including the former MILW Super Dome #53 and the Cedar Rapids Skytop Lounge to join No. 4449 and for other excursion trains at the festival.

Following a two-year hiatus needed to accommodate the locomotive's mandatory 15-year inspection and overhaul, No. 4449 returned to service on November 25, 2015 and continued to haul excursion trains each year. In late 2019, the locomotive was scheduled to haul the annual 40-minute round-trip Oregon Rail Heritage Foundation "Holiday Express" fundraiser trains through the Springwater Corridor and along Portland's Oaks Bottom Wildlife Refuge, along the Willamette River, during November and December of that year.

Due to its long rigid wheelbase and heavy weight, which were determined to cause excessive wear to the Oregon Pacific Railroad tracks being used, No. 4449 and stablemate SP&S No. 700 no longer pull the annual Holiday Express trains. Another locomotive was substituted in 2022, and the trains will be pulled by a smaller locomotive for the foreseeable future. As of 2025, No. 4449 is usually housed inside the Oregon Rail Heritage Center, only fired up on occasion. It is currently not known if it will operate mainline excursions again at some point.

=== Preservation and maintenance ===
Since 1991, No. 4449 is maintained by the volunteer non-profit group "The Friends of SP 4449", including Doyle McCormack, a retired engineer for the UP and locomotive collector. From 1981 to 2012, No. 4449 resided at UP's (formerly SP) Brooklyn roundhouse in Portland, along with several other historic steam and diesel locomotives. The Oregon Rail Heritage Foundation, a partnership of non-profit organizations that owned or maintained historic rolling stock at the roundhouse, began a campaign in late 2009 to construct a permanent, publicly accessible engine house for the City of Portland's steam locomotives.

Upon the closing of the Brooklyn roundhouse in June 2012, in order to make the yard larger, No. 4449 was moved with No. 700 and OR&N No. 197 to the ORHC, a new restoration facility and public accessible center near the Oregon Museum of Science and Industry (OMSI) in southeast Portland. The ORHC opened to the public on September 22, 2012.

== Other surviving GS Class Locomotives ==
Only one other true Southern Pacific GS-class steam engine survives: Southern Pacific No. 4460, a GS-6, which is on static display at the National Museum of Transportation in St. Louis, Missouri. It was built during World War II. The GS-6 locomotives were never painted in the Daylight scheme and were nicknamed "War Babies" and "Black Daylights". In preservation, 4460 has been referred to as the "Forgotten Daylight", due to her not running since the 1950s and seemingly in the shadow of its sister engine.

No. 4449 currently uses parts of other GS-4s, one of the driving wheels from No. 4437, the pilot truck from No. 4443, and the trailing truck from No. 4450, as evidenced by the numbers stamped on each of the parts. This was made during the SP steam era, when No. 4449 gets major repair work nearly done during recent shopping at one of SP's locomotive workshops, the shop crew would have to interchange similar parts from one of its out-of-service GS-4s due to some of No. 4449's parts being missing or still being worked on.

== Film appearances ==
- No. 4449 pulled the Gold Coast Flyer train for Tough Guys, a 1986 film starring Kirk Douglas and Burt Lancaster. The creators built a full-size wooden replica of the locomotive for the crash scene along with a scale model. The prop was auctioned off in 2023 to a private collector.
- No. 4449's Daylight skirts (flat side panels) were removed again for its appearance in Come See the Paradise, a 1990 World War II film directed by Alan Parker. The locomotive was given a coat of "false grime" to give the impression of coal soot despite No. 4449 actually being an oil burner.
- No. 4449 was fitted with an IMAX camera in 2018, to be filmed for the film Train Time, directed by famed IMAX film director, Stephen Low.

== See also ==
- Spokane, Portland and Seattle 700 — another preserved locomotive in the Oregon Rail Heritage Center

== Bibliography ==
- Huxtable, Nils (1987). Daylight Reflections. West Vancouver, BC: Steamscenes. ISBN 0-9691409-2-4. (republished 2002, ISBN 978-0969140924)
- Johnsen, Kenneth G. (2006). Southern Pacific Daylight Steam Locomotives (1st ed.). Specialty Press. ISBN 978-1-58007-098-0.
- Solomon, Brian (2005). Southern Pacific Passenger Trains (1st ed.). MBI. ISBN 0-7603-1795-X.

== Additional Reading ==
- Brueckman, Henry; Moreau, Jeffrey (1984). 4449: The Queen of Steam (1st ed.). Carbarn Press. ISBN 0-934406-01-4.
- Church, Robert J. (2004). Southern Pacific Daylight Locomotives (1st ed.). Signature Press. ISBN 1-930013-11-6.
- Diebert, Timothy S.; Strapac, Joseph A. (1987). Southern Pacific Company Steam Locomotive Conpendium (1st ed.). Shade Tree Books. ISBN 0-930742-12-5.
- Franz, Justin (2023). "DAYLIGHT rising". MORE Great American Steam Train Stories. Kalmbach Media. pp. 1–11.
- Wright, Richard K. (1975). America's Bicentennial Queen, Engine 4449: "The Lone Survivor" (1st ed.). Wright Enterprises.
