= Southern Pacific GS-5 class =

Class of 2 American 4-8-4 locomotives

Southern Pacific GS-5
- Southern Pacific 4458 with a passenger train
Type and origin
- Power type: Steam
- Builder: Lima Locomotive Works
- Serial number: 7856, 7857
- Build date: May–June 1942
- Total produced: 2
Specifications
- Configuration
  - Whyte: 4-8-4
  - UIC: 2′D2′ h2
- Gauge: 4 ft 8 1/2 in (1,435 mm) standard gauge
- Leading dia.: 36 in (914 mm)
- Driver dia.: 80 in (2,032 mm)
- Trailing dia.: 45 1/2 in (1,156 mm)
- Axle load: 69,600 lb (31,570.0 kilograms; 31.6 metric tons)
- Adhesive weight: 278,700 lb (126,400 kg; 126.4 t)
- Loco weight: 483,200 lb (219,200 kg; 219.2 t)
- Total weight: 882,800 lb (400,400 kg; 400.4 t)
- Fuel type: Fuel oil
- Fuel capacity: 5,880 US gal (22,300 L; 4,900 imp gal)
- Water cap.: 23,500 US gal (89,000 L; 19,600 imp gal)
- Firebox
  - Grate area: 388 sq ft (36.0 m^{2})
- Boiler pressure: 300 psi (2.07 MPa)
- Heating surface: 4,890 sq ft (454 m^{2})
- Superheater
  - Heating area: 1,834 sq ft (170.4 m^{2})
- Cylinders: Two, outside
- Cylinder size: 25 1/2 in × 32 in (648 mm × 813 mm)
- Valve gear: Walschaerts
Performance figures
- Tractive effort: Engine: 64,800 lbf (288.24 kN); Booster: 13,850 lbf (61.61 kN); Total: 78,650 lbf (349.85 kN)
Career
- Operators: Southern Pacific
- Class: GS-5
- Numbers: 4458, 4459
- First run: June 1942
- Retired: 1958
- Disposition: Both scrapped

The GS-5 was a class of streamlined 4-8-4 "Northern" type steam locomotive operated by the Southern Pacific Railroad (SP) from 1942 to 1958. Two were built by the Lima Locomotive Works, numbered 4458 and 4459. GS stands for "Golden State" or "General Service."

== History ==
The GS-5s were identical in appearance to the GS-4s, the only difference being the roller bearings that gave the locomotive a smoother ride and added weight. No. 4458 had roller bearings from the Timken Company and No. 4459 used SKF brand roller bearings. They had a silver smokebox with a dual-headlight casing (the top headlight was a mars light), and an enclosed, all-weather cab. It retained the skyline casing on the top of the boiler, skirting on the sides, an air horn (for use at speeds due to being louder than the whistle which was rarely if ever used on the main line), and teardrop classification lights. They received the orange and red "Daylight" paint scheme. The GS-5's were designed for high-speed passenger service on Southern Pacific's premier passenger trains, the Coast Daylight, San Joaquin Daylight, and the Sunset Limited. In later years they were painted black and had their side skirting removed for easier maintenance. The GS-5s were considered the pinnacle of the GS series and ended their careers on Southern Pacific's San Joaquin Valley line, pulling the ever popular San Joaquin Daylight until late 1956.

Both GS-5s were scrapped after running well over one million miles. The roller bearings on the two locomotives were so successful that at the time of scrapping, they were examined and showed minimal wear. Preserved GS-4 No. 4449 was equipped with roller bearings on the lead truck, trailing truck, and tender (but not the main axles or rods) in 2008, and therefore shares some similarities to a GS-5.
