= Coast Daylight =

Southern Pacific's premier San Francisco-Los Angeles passenger train

Coast Daylight Daylight Limited

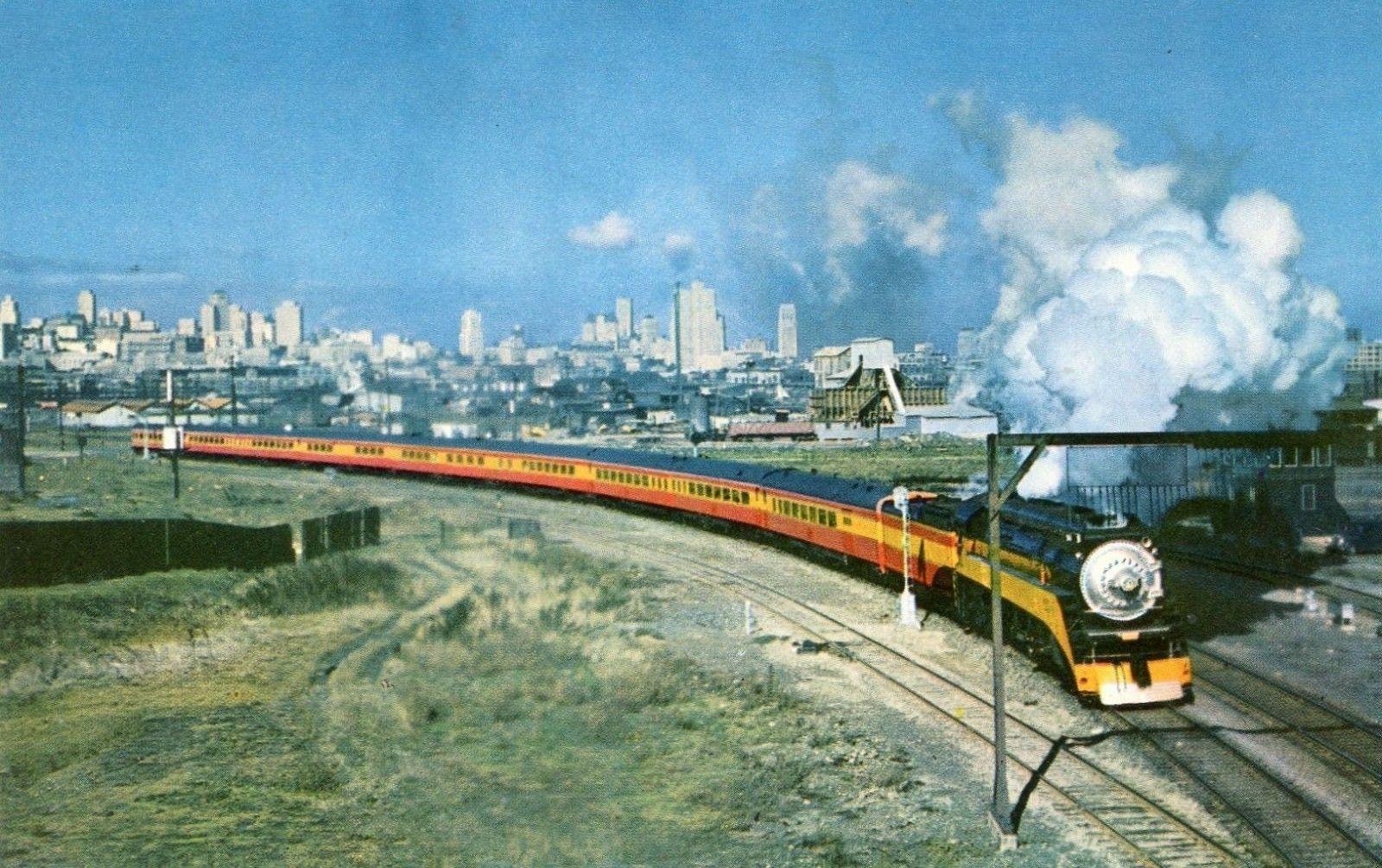
- The Coast Daylight departing San Francisco in the late 1930s

Overview
- First service: April 28, 1922
- Last service: May 19, 1974
- Successor: Coast Starlight
- Former operators: Southern Pacific; Amtrak

Route
- Termini: Los Angeles; San Francisco
- Train number: 98/99

Technical
- Track gauge: 4 ft 8 1/2 in (1,435 mm) standard gauge

The Coast Daylight, originally known as the Daylight Limited, was a passenger train on the Southern Pacific Railroad (SP) between Los Angeles and San Francisco, California, via SP's Coast Line. It was advertised as the "most beautiful passenger train in the world," carrying a particular red, orange, and black color scheme. The train operated from 1937 until 1974, being retained by Amtrak in 1971. Amtrak merged it with the Coast Starlight in 1974.

== History ==
=== Southern Pacific ===
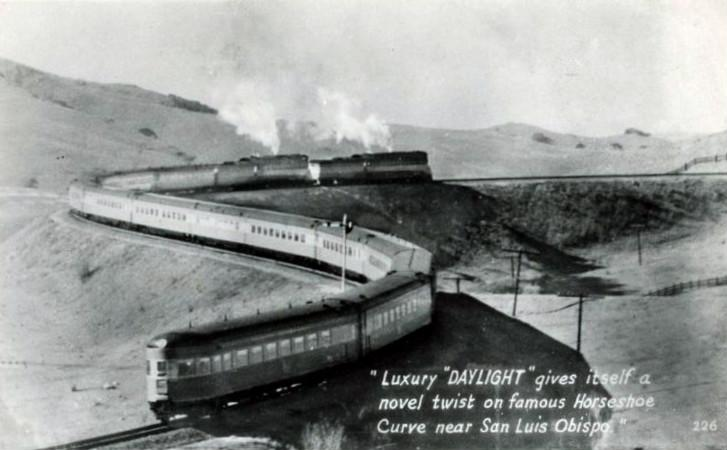
The Daylight on Horseshoe Curve

By the mid-1920s, increased population of automobiles and state highways had begun to erode the Southern Pacific's (SP) local patronage. Despite this, SP's long-distance services were less affected, and their ridership remained strong. On April 28, 1922, SP introduced the Daylight Limited, a luxury train service which operated on a 13-hour schedule between the Third and Townsend Depot in San Francisco and Central Station in Los Angeles, running on Fridays and Saturdays only. Additionally, the train ran seasonally from April to November. The Daylight Limited resumed operation in April 1923 and was gradually expanded by mid-July on a daily schedule. In 1924, SP shortened the train's running time to 12 hours for the season. By 1927, the Daylight Limited became the world's longest non-stop run, although it only stopped twice for refueling service. By this time, the Daylight Limited was advertised as the "fastest train in the West". In 1928, the Limited word was dropped from the train's name due to a few intermediate stops being added to the Daylight's schedule.

The streamlined Daylight began on March 21, 1937, on a 9 3/4-hour schedule. It was the first of the Daylight series that later included the San Joaquin Daylight, Shasta Daylight, Sacramento Daylight, and Sunbeam. The one-way fare while boarding coach class from San Francisco to Los Angeles is $9.47, while the round trip fare is $14.

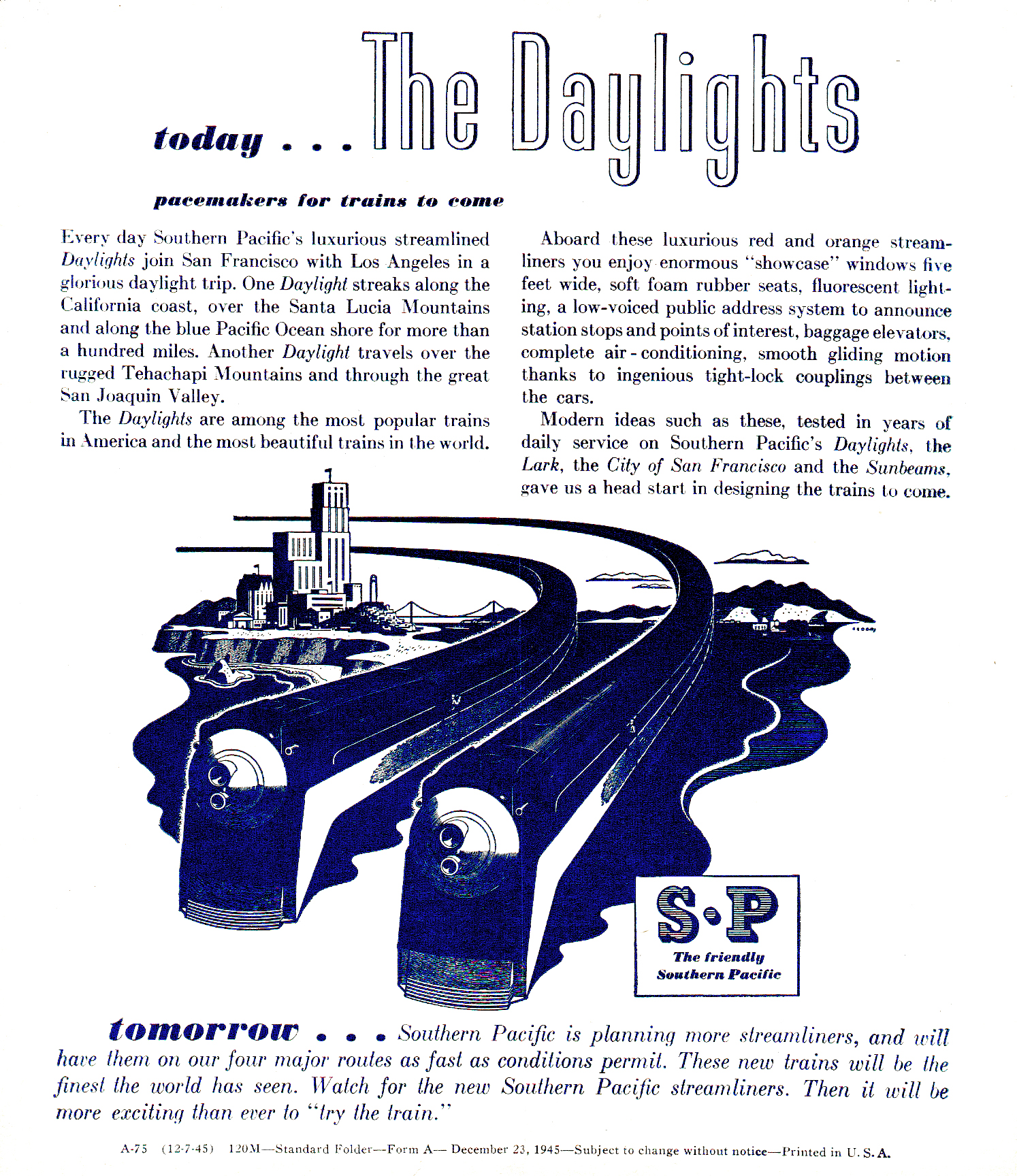
Daylights in the December 1945 timetable

By June 30, 1939, the streamlined Daylights had carried 268.6 million passenger miles (432.3 million kilometres) on 781,141 train miles (1,257,125 kilometres) for an average occupancy of 344 passengers. A second train, the Noon Daylight, was introduced on the same route on March 30, 1940; the Coast Daylight became the Morning Daylight. The Noon Daylight was suspended on January 6, 1942, to allow for equipment overhaul. The cut was originally planned to last just several months, but continued due to World War II. The Noon Daylight resumed on April 14, 1946, with timed bus connections serving Santa Cruz and Monterey.

On October 2, 1949, the Noon Daylight was replaced by the overnight Starlight using the same equipment. The Morning Daylight reverted to the Coast Daylight name. The Coast Daylight ran behind steam until January 7, 1955, long after most streamliners had changed to diesel. In 1956 coaches from the Starlight were added to the all-Pullman Lark; the Starlight was discontinued in 1957. Amtrak later revived the name for its Los Angeles to Seattle service known as the Coast Starlight.

A 1966 study by the Stanford Research Institute found that it cost the Southern Pacific $18.41 to transport a passenger on the Coast Daylight between Los Angeles and San Francisco (equivalent to $183 in 2025), roughly twice that of air or bus service. Reasons given included the labor-intensiveness of rail service, and the fact that a single consist could make only one trip per day.

=== Amtrak ===
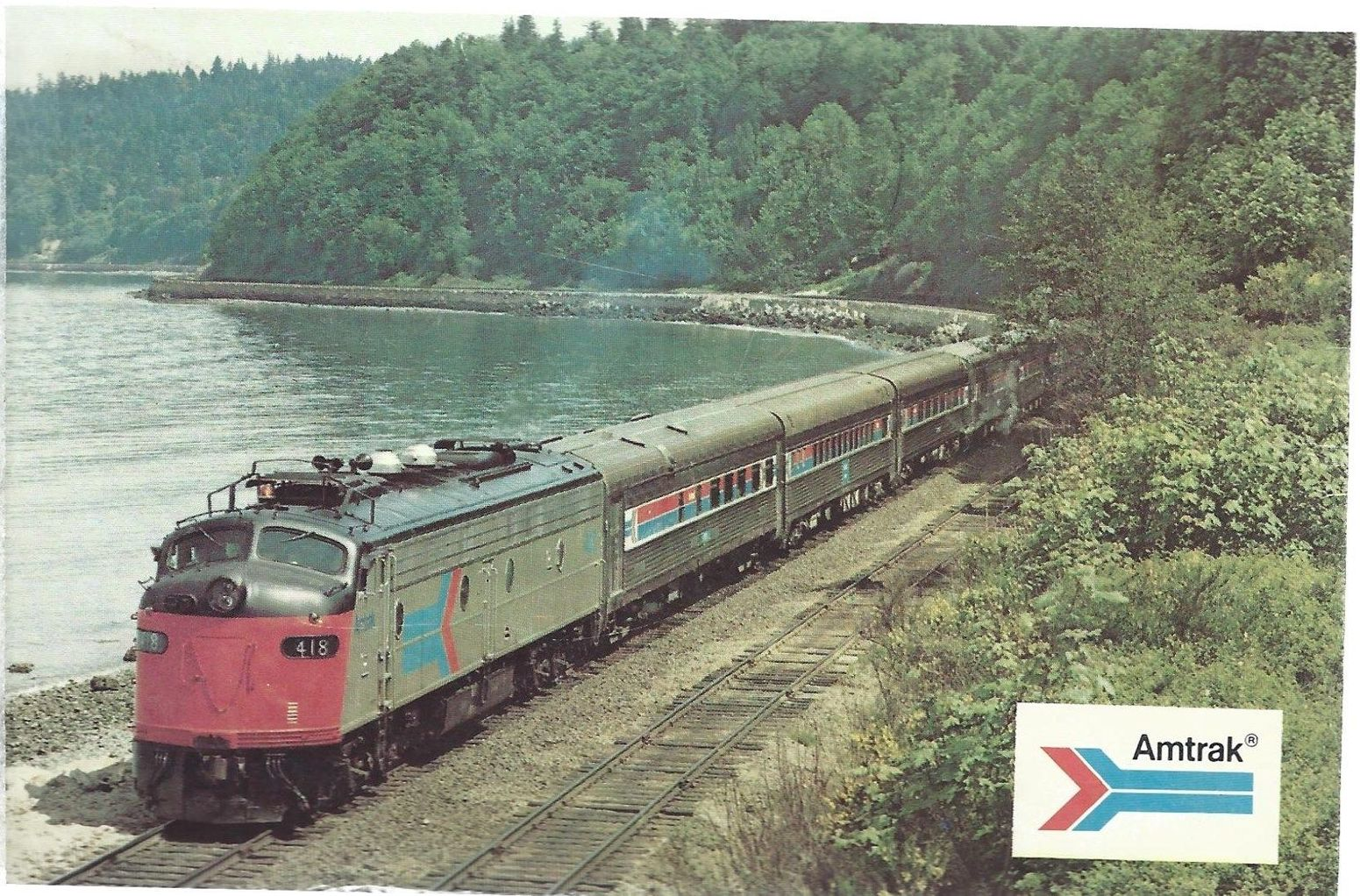
A 1974 postcard of the Coast Starlight/Daylight

Amtrak took over intercity passenger service in the United States on May 1, 1971. The Coast Daylight was retained as an unnamed train, with its northern terminus changed to Oakland, California where it connected with the California Zephyr. Three days per week, it was extended to a San Diego–Seattle train. On November 14, Amtrak extended the Oakland–Los Angeles train to San Diego, renumbered it to #12/13, and renamed it Coast Daylight. The Seattle–San Diego train became the Coast Daylight/Starlight (#11-12) northbound and Coast Starlight/Daylight (#13-14) southbound. Both trains were cut back from San Diego to Los Angeles in April 1972, replaced by a third San Diegan. On June 10, 1973, Amtrak began running the combined Coast Daylight/Starlight daily for the summer months. Positive response led to Amtrak to retain this service, and the Coast Daylight name was dropped on May 19, 1974.

=== Proposed restoration ===
Amtrak has worked on plans for resuming Coast Daylight service from San Francisco to Los Angeles since the early 1990s. It may be merged with the existing Pacific Surfliner route, thus extending the line to San Diego. A review of the possibility of service restoration was made on August 14, 2014; the San Luis Obispo Council of Governments (SLOCOG) organized and hosted a meeting between the Los Angeles – San Diego – San Luis Obispo (LOSSAN) Rail Corridor Agency and the Coast Rail Coordinating Council (CRCC), where substantial progress was made toward identifying which specific policy initiatives would be given priority so that restoration of the Coast Daylight service might be effectuated before the end of the decade. A plan by Chicago-based Corridor Capital would involve the use of ex-Santa Fe Hi-Level cars and EMD F59PHI locomotives in a top-and-tail formation.

In 2021, Amtrak released its 15-year expansion vision for new and expanded rail corridors, including service between San Luis Obispo and San Jose. This service would not only follow the Coast Daylight route, but it would also connect to Caltrain services to San Francisco.

== Equipment ==
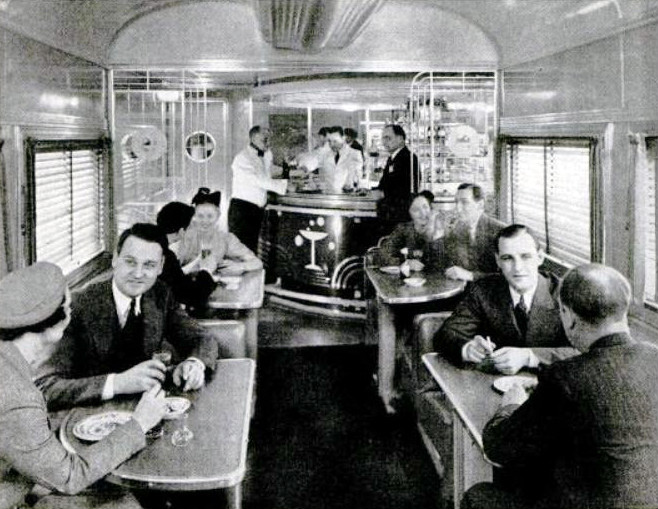
The tavern side of the 1937 coffee shop-tavern car

The heavyweight Daylight Limited debuted in 1922 with five 60-foot Harriman steel coaches and a dining car. American Car and Foundry delivered new 90-seat coaches in 1923; the SP also added a 32-seat parlor-observation car. The initial main motive powers were the 4-6-2 Heavy Pacific steam locomotives, which were later replaced by the 4-8-2 "Mountain" locomotives in the early 1930s. The Southern Pacific removed the observation cars in 1931.

Pullman-Standard delivered two complete sets of equipment (consists) for the 1937 Coast Daylight. Each consisted of a 44-seat baggage-coach; a 48-seat coach; three pairs of articulated coaches, with 50 seats in each of the six coaches; a lunch counter-tavern car, a dining car, a 29-seat parlor car; and a 23-seat parlor-observation car. Each consist cost $1 million (equivalent to $22.4 million in 2025 adjusted for inflation), the most expensive passenger trains built in the United States to date.

In the articulated coaches restrooms were split, with the men's restroom in the odd-numbered car and the women's restroom in the even-numbered car. Seating was 2×2, with a center aisle down the middle. Luggage storage was located adjacent to the vestibule. The coffee shop-tavern had two seating areas. At one end of the car was the coffee shop, with 24 individual stools arrayed around a counter. At the other end was the tavern, with booth seating for 18. Between the two areas was a kitchen. The dining car could seat 40 patrons at 10 tables. The parlor-observation car seated 10 in the rear, rounded-off observation area and a further 23 in the adjoining parlor section.

Prior to the full reequipping in 1940 the Southern Pacific made several changes to augment capacity. In 1938 it replaced the coffee shop-tavern cars with individual tavern and coffee shop cars. The original cars were rebuilt as full taverns and assigned to the Los Angeles–New Orleans Argonaut. The following year the Southern Pacific swapped the individual 48-seat coaches with an additional articulated coach pair from the Houston–Dallas Sunbeam.

The 1937–1939 equipment ran as the Noon Daylight with the inauguration of the Morning Daylight in 1940. For the Morning Daylight, the Southern Pacific ordered two new sets of equipment from Pullman-Standard. These included a 44-seat coach-baggage car; three pairs of articulated coaches, with 46 seats in each of the six coaches; a triple-unit coffee shop-kitchen-dining car; a 44-seat coach; a tavern car; a 27-seat parlor car; and a 22-seat parlor-observation car.

The Morning Daylight would be completely reequipped just a year later. The 1940 baggage-coach, tavern, and parlor were retained. It was assigned new articulated coach pairs (with the number increased from three to four), triple-unit coffee shop-kitchen-dining car, 44-seat coach, and parlor-observation car. Effectively it was the same train as in 1940, but a year newer, with an additional articulated coach. The Noon Daylight mixed old and new equipment:

- the baggage-coaches from the 1937 train
- the articulated coaches from the 1940 Morning Daylight
- the triple-unit coffee shop-kitchen-dining cars from the 1940 Morning Daylight
- a new articulated coach pair, seating 46 like all the others
- the 44-seat coach from the 1940 Morning Daylight
- the parlor car from the 1937 train
- the parlor-observation car from the 1940 Morning Daylight

With the discontinuance of the Noon Daylight in 1949 its cars were reassigned to the San Joaquin Daylight and Starlight. The Coast Daylight gained new 48-seat coaches from Pullman-Standard in 1954, three per train.

Dining cars were eliminated in the 1960s, replaced by Automat cars that offered food from vending machines instead of made-to-order meals in the dining cars, cutting the cost of the train's dining crew.

=== Locomotives ===
Two Coast Daylight locomotives survive: Southern Pacific 4449, a GS-4 steam locomotive which was a Bicentennial American Freedom Train engine in 1975–76, and Southern Pacific 6051, an EMD E9 diesel locomotive.

Steam Locomotives

Class	Wheel arrangement (Whyte notation)	Locomotive Numbers	Years of Daylight Service	Retired	Current Disposition
GS-2	4-8-4	4410–4415	1937–1941	1956	All Scrapped
GS-3	4-8-4	4416–4429	1938–1942	1957	All Scrapped
GS-4	4-8-4	4430–4457	1941–1955	1958	One survives; 4449
GS-5	4-8-4	4458 & 4459	1942–1955	1958	Both Scrapped

Diesel Locomotives

Builder	Model	Locomotive Numbers	Years of Daylight Service	Retired	Current Disposition
ALCO	PA	6005–6016, 6019–6045, 6055–6068 (A units); 5910–5915, 5918–5924 (B units)	1953–1968	1968	No Examples Survive
EMD	E7	6000–6004, 6017 (A units); 5900–5909, 5916 & 5917 (B units)	1953–1968	1968	No Examples Survive
EMD	E8	6018	1954–1968	1968	No Examples Survive
EMD	E9	6046–6054	1954–1971	1971	One Example still survives; 6051
EMD	FP7	6446–6462	1953–1971; All but 6462 sold to Amtrak in 1971	Early 1980s (with Amtrak)	No Examples Survive
EMD	SDP45	3200–3209	1967–1971; leased by Amtrak until 1974	Early 1990s	No Examples Survive

== See also ==
- Passenger train service on the Southern Pacific Railroad
