= Tracy station (Southern Pacific Railroad) =

Railway station in Tracy, California

Coordinates: 37.7344°N 121.4260°W

Tracy
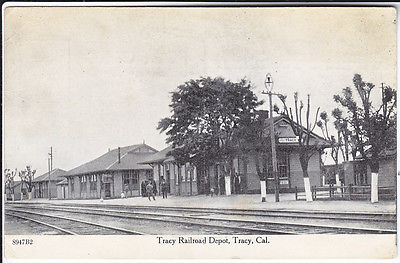
- Tracy Depot shown on a postcard, c. 1901–1907

General information
- Location: Tracy, California

History
- Opened: 1878
- Closed: April 30, 1971
- Rebuilt: 1903

Former services
Preceding station	Southern Pacific Railroad	Following station
Bethany toward Oakland Pier	San Joaquin Valley Line	Lathrop toward Los Angeles
Bethany toward Oakland Pier	San Joaquin Valley Line via West Side	Patterson toward Los Angeles
Livermore toward Oakland Pier	Overland Route	Lathrop toward Ogden
Location

Tracy was a railway station in Tracy, California. When Southern Pacific built their new railway line around Suisun Bay in September 1878, the connection was made at a point three miles east of Ellis – the junction and town built around it were named Tracy. The West Side Line was built from here, with service starting in 1892. Southern Pacific moved their operational headquarters to Tracy from Lathrop in 1894.

A new station building was constructed on the site in 1903. The first station building was moved to C and 4th Streets, and eventually torn down.

The Sacramento Daylight was truncated here after about 1970, where passengers could catch the connecting San Joaquin Daylight to continue to Los Angeles. Passenger service ended on April 30, 1971.
