= Southern Pacific 6051 =

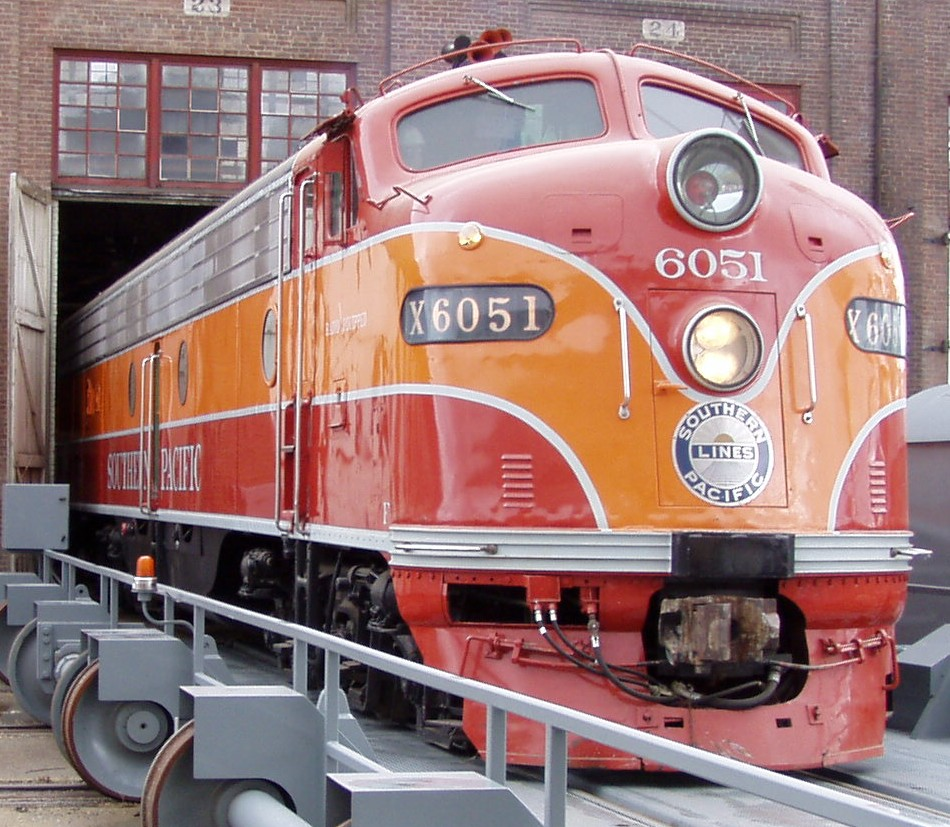
- Southern Pacific 6051 enters the transfer table at the former Southern Pacific Sacramento Shops
Type and origin
- Power type: Diesel
- Builder: General Motors Electro-Motive Division (EMD)
- Model: E9
- Build date: 1954
Specifications
- Configuration
  - AAR: A1A-A1A
- Gauge: 4 ft 8 1/2 in (1,435 mm)
- Wheel diameter: 36 in (914 mm)
- Minimum curve: 27° - 214.18 ft (65.28 m)
- Length: 70 ft 3 in (21.41 m)
- Width: 10 ft 7 1/2 in (3.239 m)
- Height: 14 ft 7 in (4.45 m)
- Loco weight: 315,000 lb (143,000 kg)
- Fuel type: Diesel
- Prime mover: (2) EMD 567C
- RPM
  - Maximum RPM: 900
- Engine type: V12 Two-stroke diesel
- Aspiration: Roots-blower
- Traction motors: (4) GM D37
- Cylinders: 12
Performance figures
- Maximum speed: 117 mph (188 km/h)
- Power output: 2,400 hp (1,790 kW)
- Tractive effort: 56,500 lb (25,600 kg) starting, 31,000 lb (14,000 kg) continuous
Career
- Operators: Southern Pacific Transportation Company; California State Railroad Museum
- Number in class: 9
- Numbers: 6051
- Locale: United States
- First run: January 4, 1955
- Retired: December 24, 1969
- Restored: 1981
- Current owner: California State Railroad Museum
- Disposition: Operational

Southern Pacific 6051 is an EMD E9 diesel locomotive. It was one of nine E9s built for SP by EMD in December 1954 for the Southern Pacific (SP).

== History ==
Southern Pacific 6051 had entered service on January 4, 1955, at Los Angeles. These nine locomotives allowed the dieselization of the Coast Daylight and Lark passenger trains. The units operated with E7s, ALCO PAs, and other passenger equipped diesels as required.

Assigned to the Los Angeles passenger pool for its entire career, it worked north via the Coast Line to San Francisco or east on the Sunset Route to El Paso or New Orleans. When SP and Rock Island began pooling locomotives on the Chicago to Los Angeles Golden State in 1967, it also worked those trains until they were discontinued the following year, often in mixed SP/Rock Island consists.

SP 6051 is the only surviving Southern Pacific passenger-dedicated diesel locomotive, and it currently resides at the California State Railroad Museum (CSRM) in Sacramento, California. It is also used for train excursions.

6051 was delivered in the Daylight paint scheme, with Farr-Aire intake grilles, a Pyle National Gyralight in the upper headlight housing, nose MU connections, dynamic braking, Nathan model M5R24 air horn (it currently sports a Nathan P5), a single Model 4740 steam generator producing 4,500 lb (2,000 kg). of steam per hour, a 1,200 US gallons (4,500 L; 1,000 imp gal) fuel tank, a 1,350 US gallons (5,100 L; 1,120 imp gal) boiler water tank, automatic transition, and a freight pilot.

It weighed 336,000 pounds (152,000 kg) and had 56,600 pounds (25,700 kg) of Starting Tractive Effort. Gear ratio was 55:22, with the Locomotive Overspeed set at 83 mph (134 km/h). In May 1958, SP 6051 was painted in the experimental black with orange nose "halloween" paint scheme.

It received the gray and scarlet "bloody nose" paint scheme shortly afterward, likely in 1959. SP 6051 was retired on December 24, 1969, and was donated to the Railway & Locomotive Historical Society at the end of the year along with Baldwin DRS-6-6-1500 5208 and EMD F7A 6402, largely through the efforts of SP Vice President Larry Hoyt. All three units were in turn deeded to the CSRM on June 22, 1978, and placed on display near Sacramento Valley Station or stored at SP's Sacramento General Shops until the CSMR was built.

SP 6051 was cosmetically and mechanically restored in the early 1980s and is in its original 1955 appearance in the Daylight paint scheme. SP 6051 was also part of the 1981 "Railfair" festivities to celebrate the opening of the California State Railroad Museum.

Southern Pacific 6051 is occasionally used as an ambassador outside of the museum for special occasions in California. Its first trip was when it operated under its own power for display in San Francisco in April 1985. Over the Daylight-Saving Time change weekend later that month, it operated on the "Western Rail Day" special trains for SP employees that made a round trip between San Jose and Sacramento on both Saturday and Sunday (the 6051 was returned to the museum during the eastbound trip that Sunday).

Other highlights include SP 6051 leading an Operation Lifesaver excursion train in 1987, attending the Los Angeles Union Passenger Terminal's 50th anniversary celebration in 1989, and in September 2005, SP 6051 and Amtrak 281, an EMD F40PH that is also preserved at the CSRM, made a trip from Sacramento to San Francisco, where it picked up Southern Pacific 2467, a 4-6-2 steam locomotive at the Golden Gate Railroad Museum, and brought it to Sacramento for display at the CSRM.

SP 6051 has made two appearances in the recent past at special events at the Union Pacific's ex-SP yard in Roseville, California. In August 2006 it attended the unveiling of Union Pacific's Southern Pacific Heritage Unit, Union Pacific 1996. In April 2009 it participated in a display along with Union Pacific 844 and various other pieces of equipment for Roseville's centennial celebration.

As of 2011, it is on display inside CSRM's gallery of historic equipment in operational condition. The only other surviving Daylight engine is Southern Pacific 4449, one of the steam locomotives originally displaced by diesels like SP 6051.
