= GS5 =

GS5 or GS-5 may refer to:

- Series 3 of Ghost Squad (TV series)
- Samsung Galaxy S5, a 2014 smart phone
- Gyakuten Saiban 5, a 2013 video game
- GS-5, a pay grade in the General Schedule (US civil service pay scale)
- Southern Pacific class GS-5, a steam locomotive
- Gaisrinė sauga, 5 grupė (VGTU)
- A PlayStation 5-themed Famiclone
