= Great Overland Station =

- Union Pacific Railroad Passenger Depot
- U.S. National Register of Historic Places
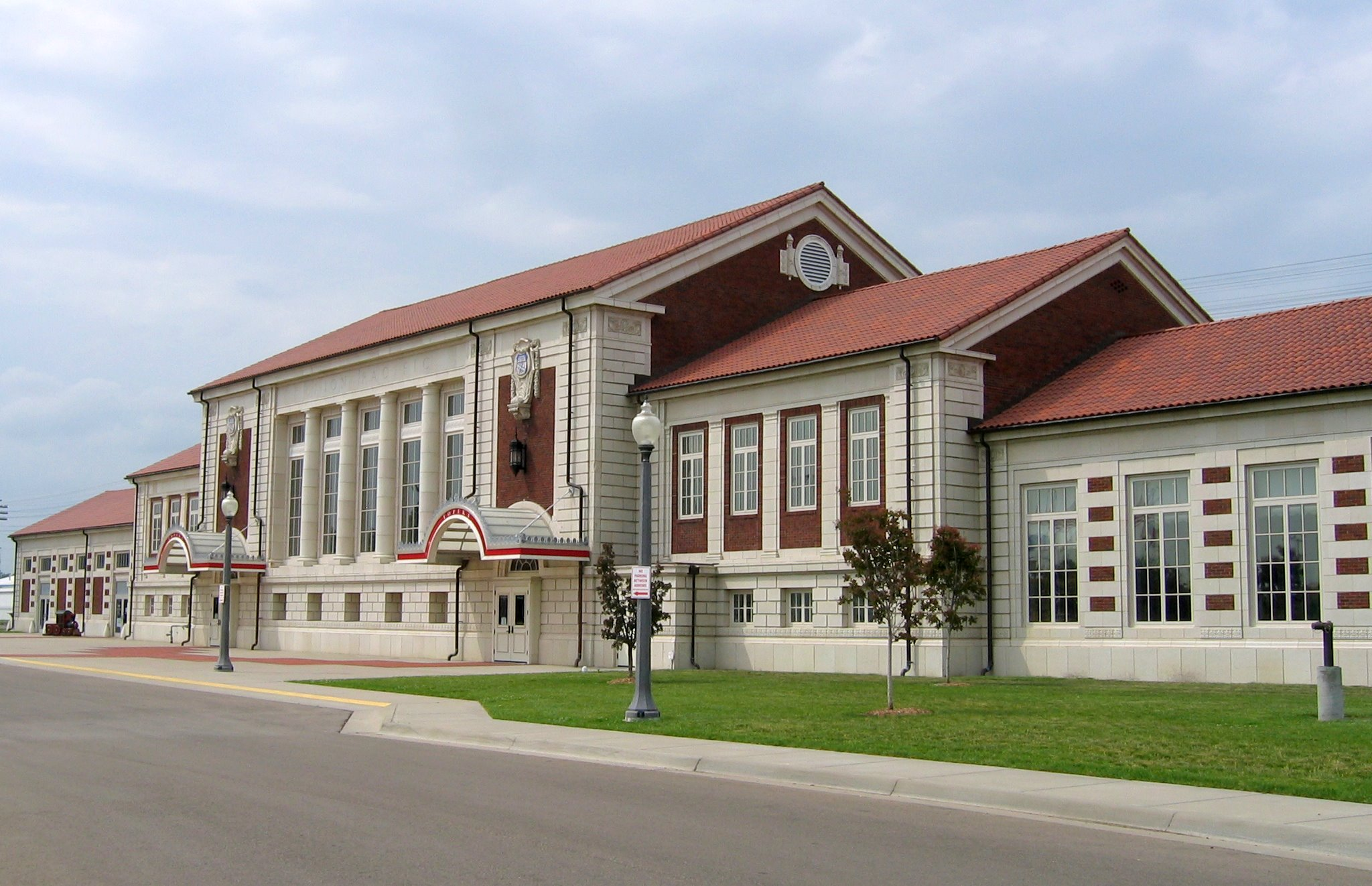

- Location within Kansas Location within the United States
- Location: 701 N. Kansas Ave., Topeka, Kansas
- Coordinates: 39°3′58″N 95°40′10″W
- Area: less than one acre
- Built: 1925–1927
- Architect: Underwood, Gilbert Stanley
- MPS: Railroad Resources of Kansas MPS
- NRHP reference No.: 02000492
- Added to NRHP: October 1, 2002

Great Overland Station, listed on the National Register of Historic Places as Union Pacific Railroad Passenger Depot, is a museum and former railroad station in Topeka, Kansas, United States. The station was built from 1925 to 1927 and designed by Gilbert Stanley Underwood, whose firm designed over 20 Union Pacific Railroad stations from 1924 to 1931. The station's Neoclassical Revival design uses terra cotta extensively and features a center pavilion with two increasingly smaller pavilions on either side. Passenger service to the station began in January 1927; almost 20,000 people attended the station's grand opening, and the new station was considered "one of the largest and finest stations west of the Missouri River". In the later years of its train station life, it also hosted the passenger trains of the Chicago, Rock Island and Pacific Railroad (Rock Island Lines). The Atchison, Topeka and Santa Fe Railway 'Santa Fe' had its trains stop at its own Topeka station.

== Passenger trains ==
- Rock Island passenger trains included the:
  - Golden State
  - Imperial
  - Oklahoma Rocket
  - Twin Star Rocket
- Union Pacific trains included the:
  - City of St. Louis
  - Pony Express

== Decline ==
Passenger totals at the station declined through the 1950s and 1960s, and the last regular passenger service to the station ended in 1971. The Union Pacific Railroad repurposed the station as office space and a customer service center before abandoning the building in 1989. In 1992, a fire damaged the western part of the station; the same year, the group Railroad Heritage, Inc. (then known as Topeka Railroad Days, Inc.) agreed to consider renovating the station. The station was extensively rehabilitated from 2000 to 2002 and is now a railroad heritage museum.

The Great Overland Station was added to the National Register of Historic Places on October 1, 2002.

Preceding station	Chicago, Rock Island and Pacific Railroad	Following station
Topeka toward Tucumcari	Tucumcari – Rock Island	Herington toward Rock Island
Topeka toward Teague	Teague – Minneapolis	Herington toward Minneapolis
Terminus	North Topeka – St. Joseph	Elmont toward St. Joseph
Preceding station	Union Pacific Railroad	Following station
Menoken toward Denver	Kansas Pacific Railway	Grantville toward Kansas City
