= Sacramento Daylight =

Southern Pacific Railroad service

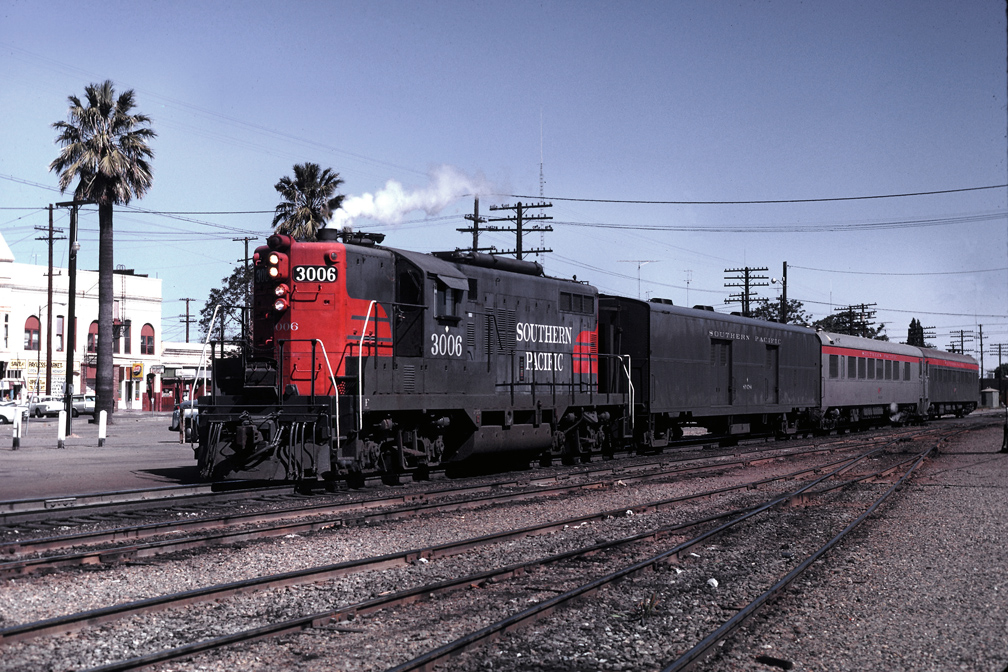
- SP 3006 with the Sacramento Daylight at Lodi on the way to Tracy in March 1971

Overview
- Status: Discontinued
- Locale: California
- First service: 1946
- Last service: May 1, 1971
- Former operator: Southern Pacific Railroad

Route
- Termini: Sacramento; Los Angeles Union Station (1946–1970); Tracy (1970–1971)
- Train number: 53/54

Technical
- Track gauge: 4 ft 8 1/2 in (1,435 mm) standard gauge

The Sacramento Daylight was a named passenger train operated by the Southern Pacific Railroad, part of the family of "Daylights" which included the San Joaquin Daylight, Shasta Daylight, Coast Daylight, and Sunbeam. It carried train numbers 53 and 54.

The Southern Pacific introduced the Sacramento Daylight in 1946 as a Sacramento section of the Los Angeles—Oakland San Joaquin Daylight; the Sacramento cars were cut out at Lathrop. Around 1970 the through cars ended; the train from Sacramento ran past Lathrop to Tracy and connected to the Los Angeles train there. The San Joaquin/Sacramento Daylight survived until the formation of Amtrak on May 1, 1971, when they were both discontinued.
