= EMD E9 =

Model of 2400 hp American passenger cab locomotive

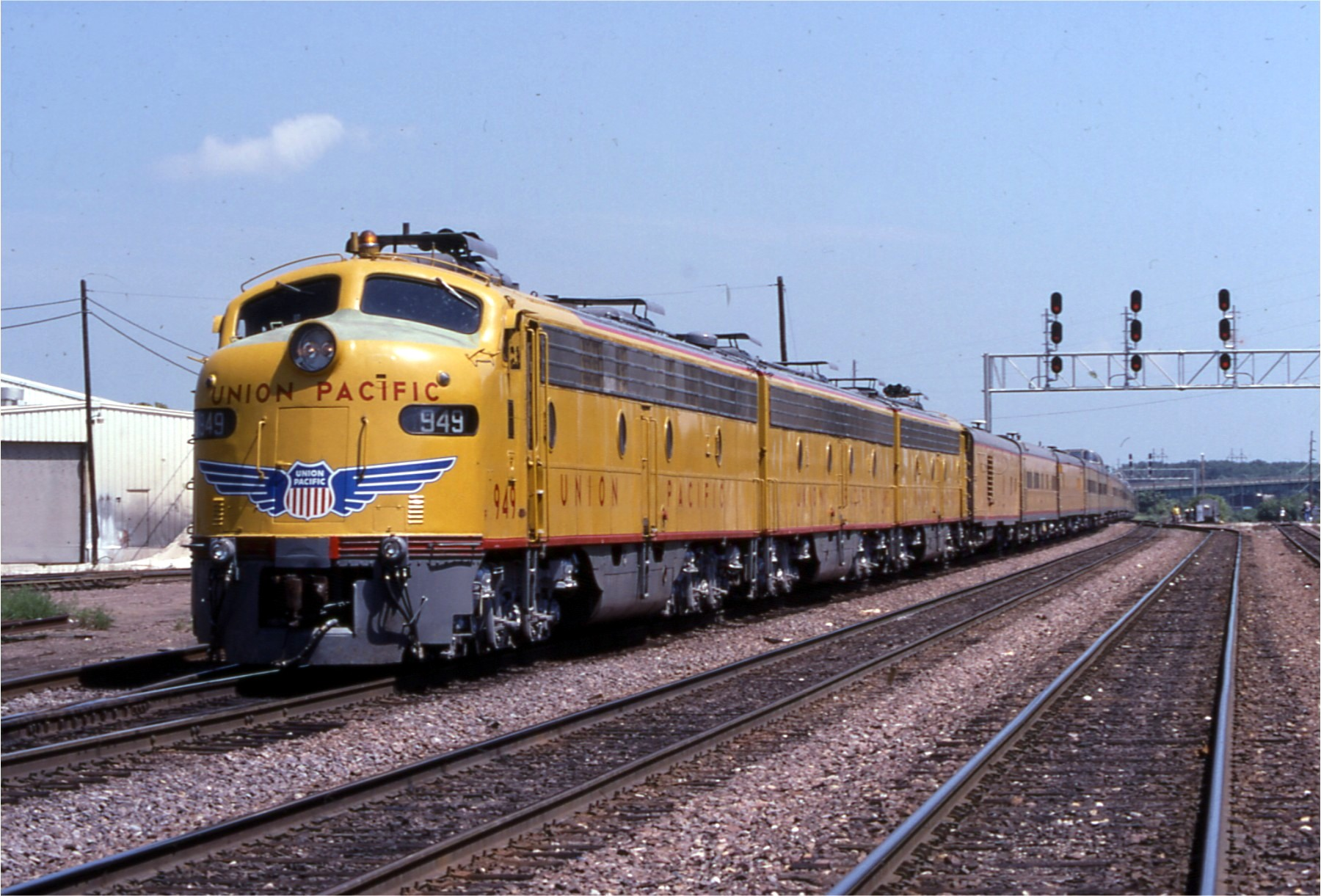
- UP #949 leads an excursion through Clinton, Iowa in August 1995.
Type and origin
- Power type: Diesel-electric
- Builder: General Motors Electro-Motive Division (EMD)
- Model: E9
- Build date: April 1954 – January 1964
- Total produced: 100 A units, 44 B units
Specifications
- Configuration
  - AAR: A1A-A1A
- Gauge: 4 ft 8 1/2 in (1,435 mm)
- Wheel diameter: 36 in (914 mm)
- Minimum curve: 27° - 214.18 ft (65.28 m)
- Length: 70 ft 3 in (21.41 m)
- Width: 10 ft 7 1/2 in (3.239 m)
- Height: 14 ft 7 in (4.45 m)
- Loco weight: A unit: 315,000 lb (143,000 kg), B unit: 290,000 lb (130,000 kg)
- Fuel type: Diesel
- Prime mover: (2) EMD 12-567C
- RPM
  - Maximum RPM: 900
- Engine type: V12 Two-stroke diesel
- Aspiration: Roots-blower
- Traction motors: 4 × GM D37
- Cylinders: 12
Performance figures
- Maximum speed: 117 mph (188 km/h)
- Power output: 2,400 hp (1,790 kW)
- Tractive effort: 56,500 lbf (251,000 N) starting, 31,000 lbf (140,000 N) continuous
Career
- Locale: United States
- Disposition: 42 preserved, none in revenue service though some used on special trains, remainder scrapped

The E9 is a 2,400-horsepower (1,790 kW), A1A-A1A passenger train-hauling diesel locomotive built by General Motors' Electro-Motive Division of La Grange, Illinois, between April 1954 and January 1964. 100 cab-equipped A units were produced and 44 cabless booster B units, all for service in the United States. The E9 was the tenth and last model of EMD E-unit and differed from the earlier E8 as built only by the newer engines and a different, flusher-fitting mounting for the headlight glass, the latter being the only visible difference. Since some E8s were fitted with this, it is not a reliable way to distinguish the two. The E9 has two 1,200 hp (895 kW), V12 model 567C engines, each engine driving one generator to power two traction motors.

== Engine and powertrain ==
The E9 uses twin 12 cylinder 567C engines developing a total of 2,400 hp (1,800 kW) at 800 rpm. Designed specifically for railroad locomotives, this Roots-blown, mechanically aspirated 2-stroke 45-degree V-type, with an 8 1/2 by 10 in (216 by 254 mm), bore by stroke, giving 567 cubic inches (9.29 L) displacement per cylinder, remained in production until 1966. Two DC generators, one per engine, provide power to four motors, two on each truck, in an A1A-A1A arrangement. This truck design was used on all E units and on MP 7100 and CB&Q 9908 power cars. EMD has built all of its major components since 1939.

== Operation ==
The E9 powered American passenger and mail trains from the 1950s into the late 1970s. Many of America's finest trains — such as Union Pacific Railroad's "City" fleet, Burlington's "Zephyr" fleet and Southern Pacific Railroad's Coast Daylight and Sunset Limited — had E9s pulling them. E9s and their E7 and E8 kin ran throughout the country on lesser-known passenger trains, Chicago's network of commuter trains and many mail and express trains. As America's passenger train network shrank due to unprofitability, Union Pacific, Rock Island and Illinois Central began using E9s on freight trains while Burlington Northern began upgrading their fleets of E9s with Head-end power and EMD 645 power assemblies for commuter operations in the Chicago metropolitan area into the early 1990s.

Amtrak, founded in 1971, bought 36 E9As and 23 E9Bs from the Union Pacific, Milwaukee Road, B&O and SCL. Amtrak used the E9s until 1979 and converted some E9B units to steam generator and head end power cars.

== Original owners ==
A total of 100 cab-equipped lead A units and 44 cabless-booster or B units were built. Approximately ten railroads purchased A units, B units, or both. The single largest buyer was the Union Pacific Railroad, which purchased 35 A units and 34 B units. Other significant buyers included the Milwaukee Road (18 A units and 6 B units), Chicago, Burlington and Quincy Railroad (16 A units), and the Illinois Central Railroad (10 A units and 4 B units).

== Surviving examples ==
As of 1997, 42 E9 locomotives survived. (Note: According to Andrew Toppan's list of March 5, 1997, 42 survive.) Many of these have been donated to several museums and tourist railroads. A number of railroads keep a small number in service for hauling inspection specials, charter passenger trains, investor tours and other special trains.

- Five E9s are owned by the Illinois Railway Museum, in Union, Illinois. The operating units are often used pulling trains within museum grounds.
- The Union Pacific Railroad rosters three E9s: two A units, 951 and 949, and a B unit, 963B (built as UP E9B 970B), in their heritage fleet. They were rebuilt in 1993 with a single 2000 hp EMD 16-645E engine and upgraded electrical and control equipment for compatibility with more modern locomotives.
- Southern Pacific 6051, the last surviving SP E9, is preserved at the California State Railroad Museum and operates excursions hosted by the museum.
- CN previously owned ex-Chicago, Burlington & Quincy E9A 9986A, painted in CN's heritage livery and numbered 103. It was delivered to the National Railway Museum in Green Bay Wisconsin on February 29, 2024.
- Milwaukee Road 32A is owned and operated by the Friends of the 261, who acquired it in 2019. This unit was previously used on the Wisconsin and Southern Railroad as their 101.

== See also ==
- List of GM-EMD locomotives
