= Acadian (train) =

Passenger night train between Louisiana and Texas, USA

Overview
- Service type: Inter-city rail
- Status: Discontinued
- Locale: Southern United States
- First service: 1936
- Last service: 1956
- Former operator(s): Southern Pacific Railroad

Route
- Termini: New Orleans, Louisiana; Houston, Texas
- Distance travelled: 363 miles (584 km)
- Average journey time: 9½ hours
- Service frequency: daily
- Train number(s): 4 (eastbound); 3 (westbound)
- Line(s) used: Sunset Route

On-board services
- Seating arrangements: Chair cars and coaches
- Sleeping arrangements: Open sections, drawing rooms and compartments [1947]
- Observation facilities: Observation lounges

Technical
- Track gauge: 4 ft 8 1/2 in (1,435 mm)

The Acadian was the name of a passenger train of the Southern Pacific which ran daily as a night train between New Orleans, Louisiana, and Houston, Texas. The Acadian was one of several passenger trains, including the Sunset Limited and Argonaut, which operated over the eastern end (east of Houston) of the "Sunset Route". The 1956 iteration of the Acadian (which ran as #4 eastbound and #3 westbound) departed Houston at 9:45 pm and arrived in New Orleans at 7:20 am the following morning, while the westbound train departed New Orleans at 9:20 pm and arrived in Houston 7:10 am. The Southern Pacific ended the Acadian in 1956.
