= Californian (train) =

Passenger train in the western United States

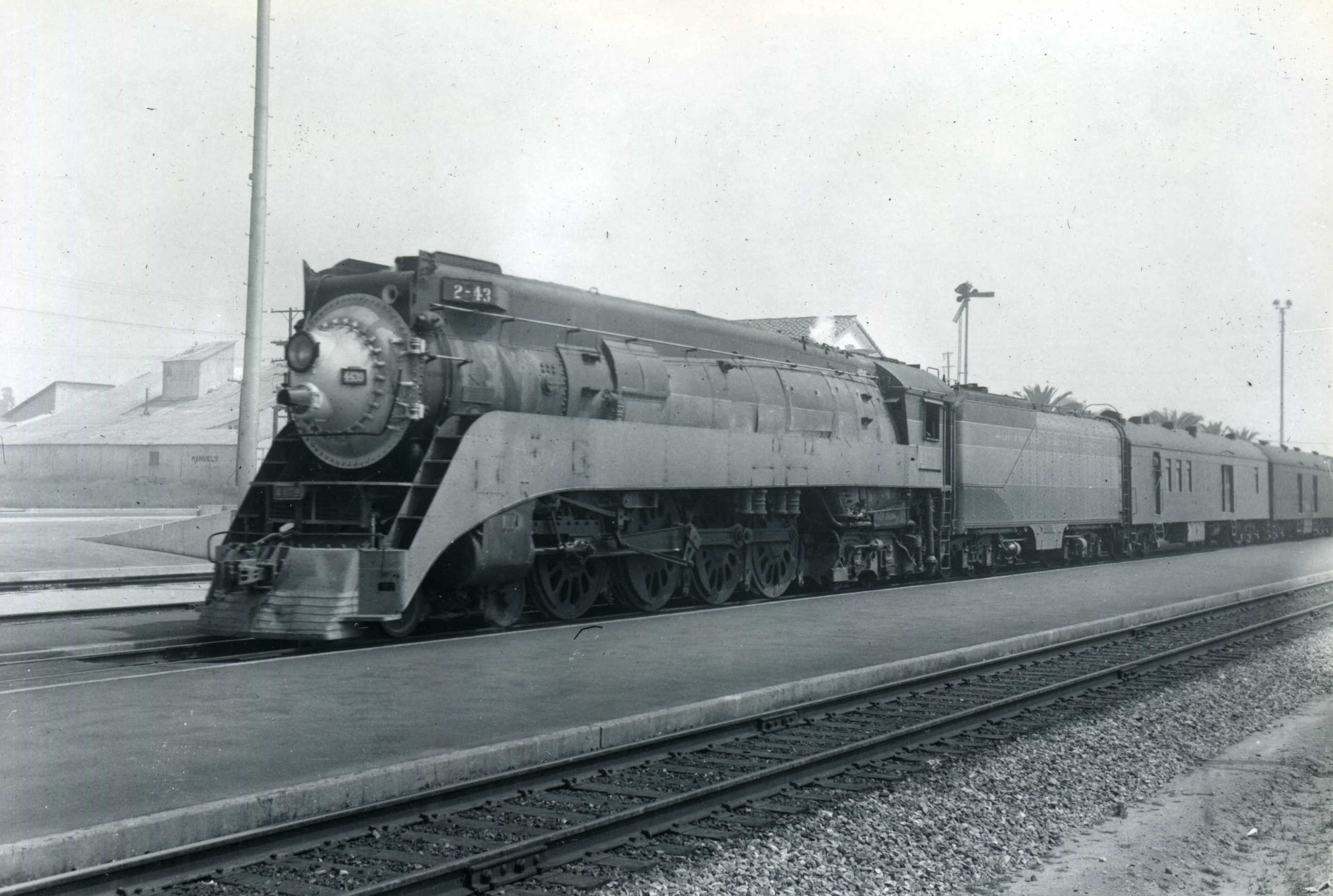
- No. 4439 pulling the Californian No. 43 in the mid-1940s.

Overview
- Service type: Inter-city rail
- Status: Discontinued
- Locale: Southern California, Arizona, New Mexico, west Texas, Kansas, Missouri, Iowa and Illinois
- First service: January 3, 1910
- Last service: January 9, 1955
- Former operators: Southern Pacific; Rock Island

Route
- Termini: Los Angeles; Chicago

Technical
- Track gauge: 4 ft 8 1/2 in (1,435 mm) standard gauge

The Californian was a passenger train of the Southern Pacific on its route between Los Angeles and El Paso, Texas, and over connecting lines as far as Chicago. Trains numbered 1 and 2 with standard and tourist sleepers from Los Angeles began service on January 3, 1910, over the El Paso and Southwestern Railroad (EPSW) from El Paso to Tucumcari, New Mexico, and thence over the Chicago, Rock Island and Pacific Railroad (Rock Island) initially to Kansas City, and extended to Chicago on February 26, 1915. Southern Pacific assumed control of the EPSW in 1924. The Great Depression caused cancellation of the Californian on September 21, 1930, retaining service as far as Calexico, California, as the Imperial trains 13 and 14. A Californian of modern economy chair cars and tourist sleepers resumed service between Los Angeles and Chicago on January 3, 1937, as trains numbered 43 and 44. On May 18, 1947, trains 43 and 44 were renamed the Passenger as far as Tucumcari, connecting with Rock Island trains 111 and 112 to Oklahoma City and Memphis, Tennessee. Trains 43 and 44 between Los Angeles and Tucumcari were renamed the Cherokee from March 13, 1949, until the name was dropped when the train became head-end cars only with a single rider coach on July 8, 1951. Trains 43 and 44 last ran on January 9, 1955.
