= Mars Light =

Signal safety lights

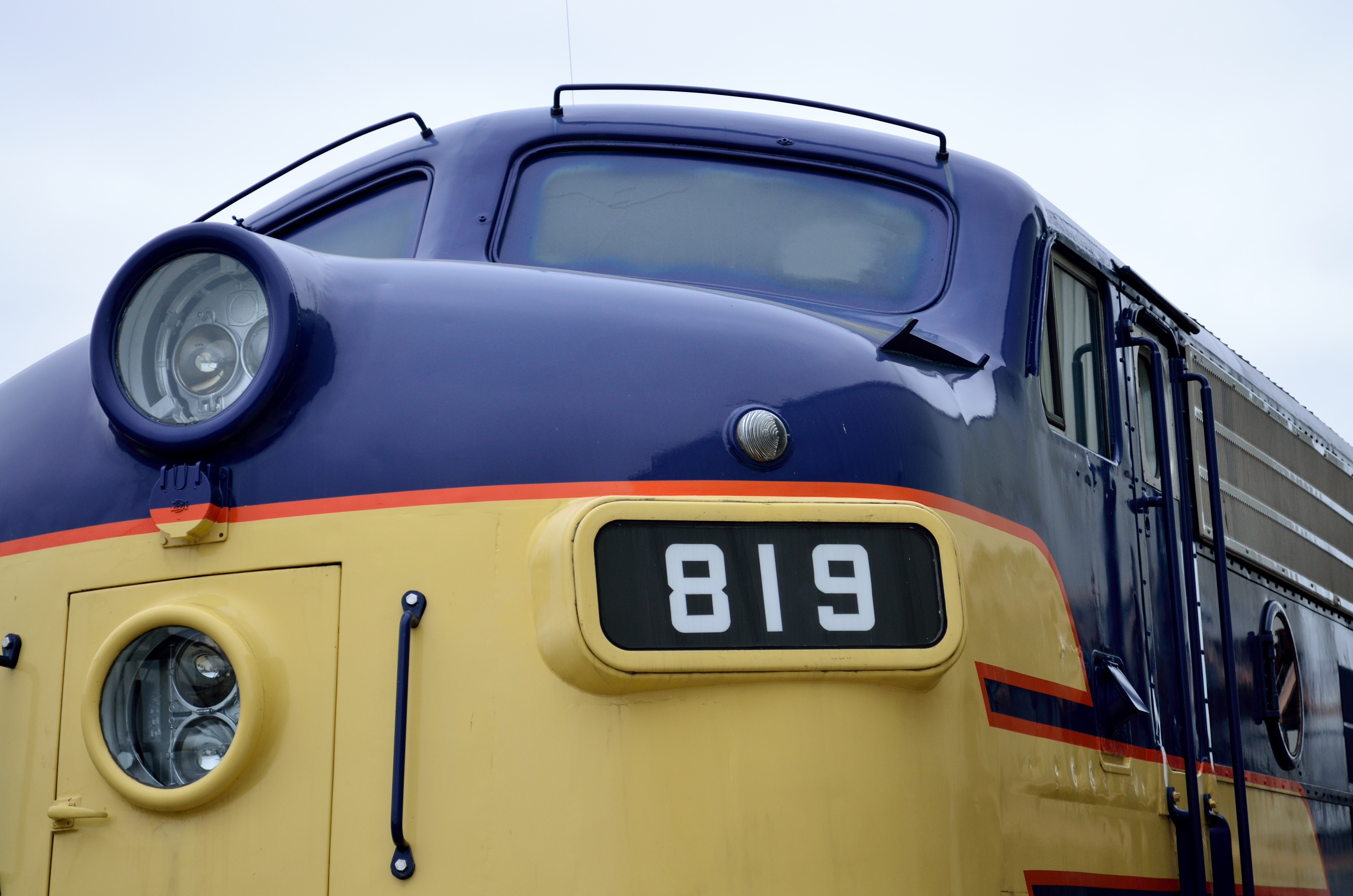
A Mars Light is mounted in the lower lamp housing on this EMD F7 diesel locomotive. More detail can be seen at high resolution.

Mars Lights are signal-safety lights used in the United States and built by Mars Signal Light Company for railroad locomotives and firefighting apparatus. Mars Lights used a variety of means to cause the light to oscillate vertically, horizontally, or both, to catch the attention of motorists and pedestrians.

Mars lights were developed by Jerry Kennelly, a Chicago firefighter who realized that oscillating lamps would benefit fire departments and railroads. He performed an operational test with the Chicago and North Western railroad in 1936, and Mars Lights began appearing on locomotives in the later 1930s.

Tri Lite, Inc. announced its acquisition of the Mars Signal Light Company, on January 23, 1991. Tri Lite still manufactures many of the traditional Mars Lights under the Tri Lite Mars brand. The company has since updated the Mars "888" Traffic Breaker with energy-efficient LEDs replacing the earlier sealed beam halogen/incandescent lamp.

== Design variations ==
There were many models of Mars Lights, that used several methods to oscillate the beam. Sometimes the entire lamp and assembly were moved; on other models, the reflector behind the bulb was rotated. The beam was usually oscillated in a triple eight pattern, i.e., the beam would oscillate up and down two or more times for every horizontal sweep, providing a source for the company slogan, "The Light from Mars". The beams came in a variety of shapes and colors, with some locomotives having red and white lights.

== Railroad use ==
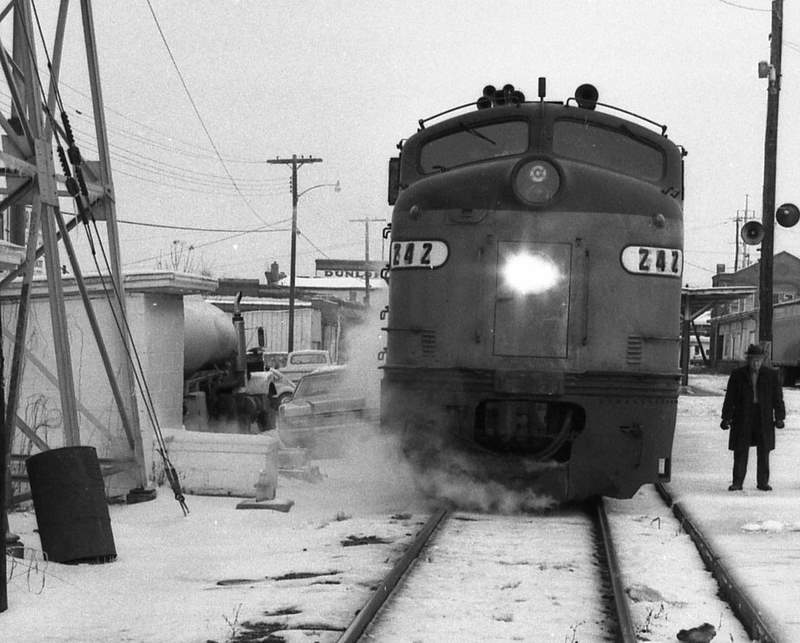
An illuminated Mars Light on an Amtrak EMD E8

Many railroads used Mars lights on a variety of locomotives, both steam and diesel, from 1930s until 1990s. Prominent users were railroads such as the Chicago and North Western, Southern Pacific, and Denver and Rio Grande Western. Mars Lights are no longer used on modern rolling stock, having been replaced by ditch lights, with the exception of some passenger carriers, such as Chicago's Metra, which uses both Mars Lights (specifically on the Gallery cars) and ditch lights on their equipment. Older locomotives originally equipped with Mars Lights may still use them if fitted and still functioning.

== Fire department use ==
Mars Lights are still used on fire fighting apparatus. The lights continue to be produced, and are available from Tri Lite / Mars, located in Chicago, Illinois.

The Los Angeles County Fire Department required Mars lights as a standard LACoFD warning device until the Federal Sign & Signal BeaconRay was adopted as a replacement.

The Mars light, also called the Mars Signal Light, is an oscillating warning light that was developed in the 1920 to 30s by Chicago firefighter Jerry Kennelly. It has a built-in motorised system that produces a beam in a unique 'figure 8' pattern that greatly enhances the ability of emergency vehicles to see through traffic. Fire departments that implemented this earlier on had success in lowering collision risks, especially in densely populated cities.

The first fire department to carry such lights were the Chicago Fire Department, which in 1929 began using Mars lights, and in the 1930s the lighting system grew in popularity. Some firefighting vehicles were recipients of this lighting system, some vehicles worth noting are the American LaFrance pumper from 1942 and the 1934 Pirsch model fire truck, both trucks belonged to the Aurora Fire Department (Illinois). By the late 1930s and early 1940s, Mars light technology was well established in various fire stations and departments, including New York's, and was a familiar indicator of an emergency vehicle across the U.S.

By the late 90s, federal regulations had seen most of the mechanical Mars lights phased out of the railroad industry because they were expensive to maintain and preferred fixed ditch lights. However, fire services trucks still continued to use them. The oscillating motion allows for the benefit of being suitable for a firefighter's purpose or mission and can help improve drivers' and pedestrians' awareness in the chaotic-dynamic high-risk scene of arrival of a firetruck where fixed beams are less effective.

Nowadays, numerous variations of Mars light using LEDs are available, including the Tri Lite Mars 888 pedestal-mounted beacon. These models can also give about three times the radiance as traditional halogen models although they consume less power but they are more durable because of the absence of fragile filaments, and they need little maintenance, yet they will maintain the classic sweeping pattern. These are still being called out on new fire apparatus at 12-24v and are available in red or clear filament.

== Gyralite ==
Gyralite is a similar type of gyrating warning light formerly made by The Pyle-National Company and now by Trans-Lite, Inc. It is distinguishable from the Mars Light in that the ratio of vertical oscillations to horizontal oscillations is unitary, producing a circular or elliptical scan effect.

== See also ==
- Grade crossing signals
