= Argonaut (train) =

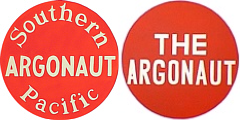
- "Drumhead" logos such as these often adorned the ends of observation cars on the Argonaut.

Overview
- Service type: Inter-city rail
- Status: Discontinued
- Locale: Southwestern United States / Western United States
- First service: 1926; 100 years ago to 1936, 1938
- Last service: 1958; 68 years ago
- Former operator: Southern Pacific

Route
- Termini: New Orleans, Louisiana; Los Angeles, California
- Distance travelled: 1,996 miles (3,212 km)
- Service frequency: Daily
- Train numbers: 5 (westbound), 6 (eastbound)

On-board services
- Seating arrangements: Chair cars
- Sleeping arrangements: Open sections, double bedrooms, drawing rooms and compartments
- Catering facilities: Dining car
- Observation facilities: Lounge car (1952)

The Argonaut was the Southern Pacific Railroad's secondary passenger train between New Orleans and Los Angeles via Houston, San Antonio, and El Paso, Texas; Tucson, Arizona; and Palm Springs, California. It started in 1926 on a 61 hr 35 min schedule Los Angeles to New Orleans, five hours slower than the Sunset Limited; it was discontinued west of Houston in 1958. (It was also dropped from May 1932 until May 1936.) In earlier years it carried sleeping cars from New Orleans to Yuma that would continue to San Diego via San Diego and Arizona Eastern Railway, a SP subsidiary. Westbound trains carried sleeping cars from New Orleans and Houston to San Antonio.

The Sunset Limited was the premiere SP train on the "Sunset Route" — and probably on the whole SP system — and the Argonaut was a slower secondary train. The Argonaut needed 50 hours between New Orleans and Los Angeles, while after 1950 the Sunset Limited needed 42. The Argonaut ran Tucson to El Paso via Deming; the westward train usually ran on the EP&SW line via Douglas.

Unlike the first-class Sunset Limited the Argonaut was always a train for economy travel, carrying standard coaches and few standard sleepers, allowing people to travel at moderate prices but with full dining and sleeping car service.

Another counterpart was the Imperial, which had Los Angeles and San Diego branches. The latter had a route which would twice cross the Mexico–United States border.

Through its life the train had olive green and black heavyweight passenger cars, pulled by steam locomotives like the GS-1 4-8-4 or MT-4 4-8-2, sometimes even a Cab Forward 4-8-8-2. In its last years the train was pulled by EMD F7 or ALCO PA/PB diesel locomotives.

By its final year its route was shortened to have El Paso as its western terminus.

== See also ==
- Acadian
