= San Joaquin Daylight =

Southern Pacific Railroad service via the Central Valley

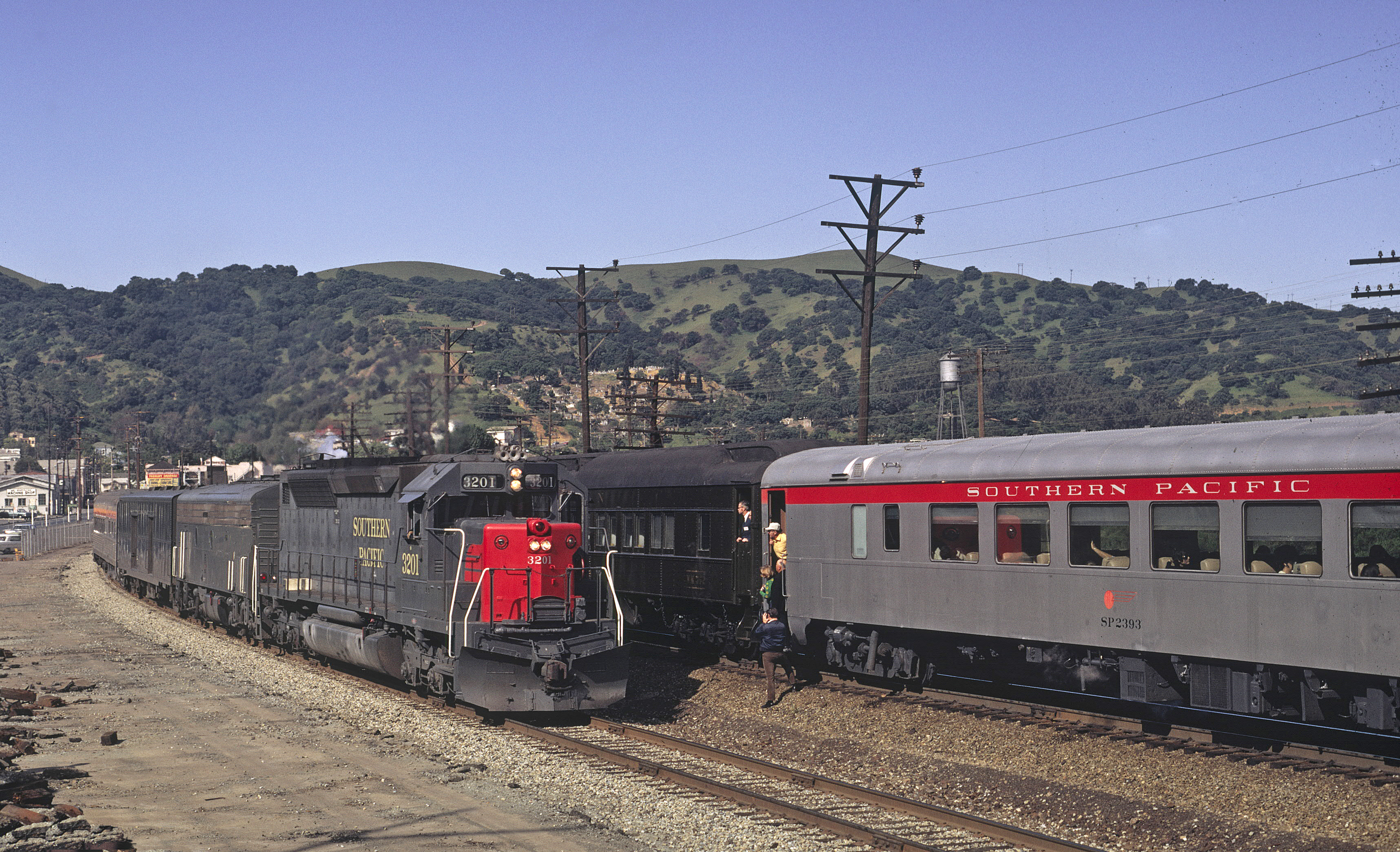
- An EMD SDP45 leads the San Joaquin Daylight at Martinez, California in April 1971, just prior to discontinuance.

Overview
- Status: Discontinued
- Locale: California
- First service: July 4, 1941
- Last service: April 30, 1971
- Former operator: Southern Pacific Transportation Company

Route
- Termini: Los Angeles Union Station; Oakland Pier
- Train number: 51/52

Technical
- Track gauge: 4 ft 8 1/2 in (1,435 mm) standard gauge

The San Joaquin Daylight was a Southern Pacific passenger train (train numbers 51 and 52) inaugurated between Los Angeles and San Francisco's Oakland Pier by way of the San Joaquin Valley and Tehachapi Pass on July 4, 1941. Travel times were between 12 hours (1970) and 14 hours (1944). It operated until the advent of Amtrak in 1971.

== History ==
Train numbers 51 and 52 were named the San Joaquin Flyer on March 20, 1927. The name was changed to the San Joaquin on the January 1928 timetable. All streamlined lightweight equipment brought the name change to San Joaquin Daylight on July 4, 1941.

== Passenger cars ==
Pullman-Standard built coaches were assigned to the two train sets, both articulated pairs and singles. The 40-seat dining car and parlor-observation car had been built for the original 1937 Daylight. Each train set had ten cars painted in SP's Daylight colors (red and orange, with black roofs and white striping and lettering), and included two head-end cars rebuilt from heavyweights by the SP Sacramento shops repainted Daylight colors to match the rest of the train.

== Locomotives ==
SP initially assigned three P-10 class Pacific steam locomotives 2383-2385 after semi-streamlining them and painting them in Daylight colors at the Sacramento shops. A single Pacific ran between Oakland Pier and Bakersfield; a pair of those Pacifics was assigned between Los Angeles and Bakersfield. The helper P-10 that led the northbound San Joaquin Daylight from Los Angeles to Bakersfield returned on the southbound San Joaquin Daylight from Bakersfield.

Diesel power included EMD F-units and Alco PAs, later supplemented by GP9s and SDP45s.

== Inaugural runs ==
The inaugural runs were as follows:

=== First consist ===
2383 P-10 class 4-6-2 Streamlined Pacific Locomotive & Tender

5069 Heavyweight Modernized Baggage 30’ Railway Post Office Car

6091 Heavyweight Modernized Baggage Car

2492 44 Revenue seat Coach

2478 Articulated 46 Revenue seat Coach 2477 Articulated 46 Revenue seat Coach

10200 40 seat Dining Car

2480 Articulated 46 Revenue seat Coach 2479 Articulated 46 Revenue seat Coach

2487 44 Revenue seat Coach

2950 23 Revenue seat Parlor 10 seat Lounge Observation

=== Second consist ===
2385 P-10 Class 4-6-2 Streamlined Pacific Locomotive and Tender (Helper) (Los Angeles – Bakersfield)

2384 P-10 Class 4-6-2 Streamlined Pacific Locomotive and Tender

5017 Heavyweight Modernized Baggage 30’ Railway Post Office Car

6092 Heavyweight Modernized Baggage Car

2493 44 Revenue seat Coach

2482 Articulated 46 Revenue seat Coach 2481 Articulated 46 Revenue seat Coach

10201 40 seat Dining Car

2484 Articulated 46 Revenue seat Coach 2483 Articulated 46 Revenue seat Coach

2488 44 Revenue seat Coach

2951 23 Revenue seat Parlor 10 seat Lounge Observation

== Later history ==
In 1946 a Sacramento section of the San Joaquin Daylight was introduced, named the Sacramento Daylight, trains 53-54. The two trains ran together from Los Angeles to Lathrop, where they split. In 1970 the split moved from Lathrop to Tracy.

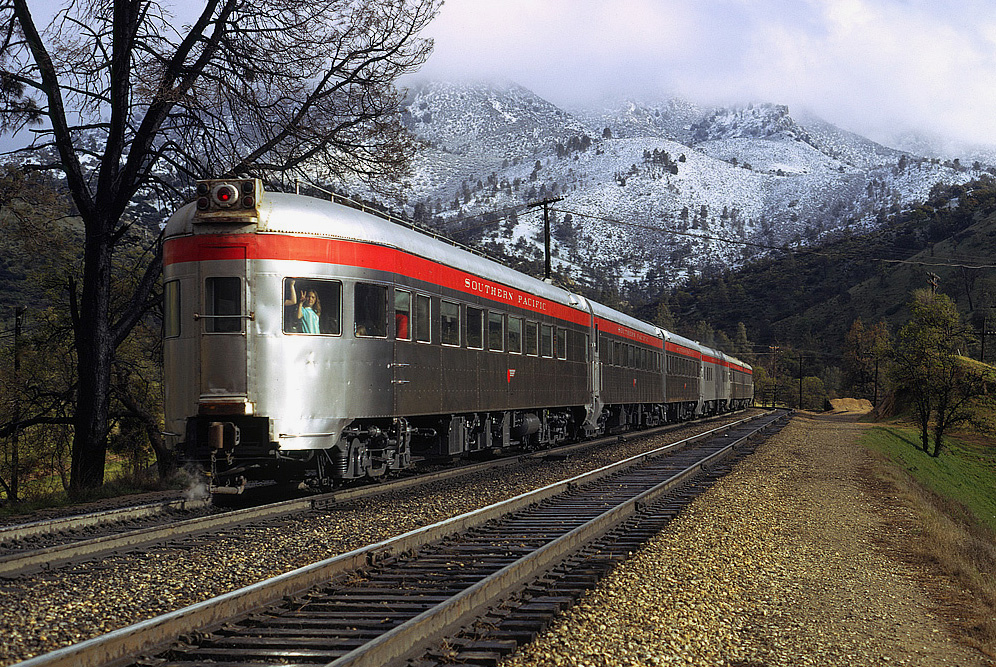
The San Joaquin Daylight in March 1971, one month before Amtrak took over nationwide rail passenger service in the United States.

The San Joaquin Daylight's dining car was replaced by a coffee-shop car by the 1950s. The parlor-observation car was also removed, though it immediately gained a second life. In 1954 SP placed two of its seven home-built dome-lounge cars in the consists; one of the cars was rebuilt from the train's own parlor-observation car. The dome car was discontinued in the late 1960s.

In 1961 the coffee-shop car was replaced by SP's automat cars which had vended meals and non-alcoholic beverages, a self-service microwave oven, and a table area. This lasted to the end of service.

The San Joaquin Daylight ran until April 30, 1971, the day before Amtrak took over nationwide rail passenger service in the United States. In March 1974 Amtrak's San Joaquins began running between the Bay Area and Fresno and Bakersfield on Santa Fe track in the San Joaquin Valley. Altamont Corridor Express commuter rail trains in the Bay Area are expected to operate as far south as Merced along the former Daylight route by 2027.

== Overnight: The Owl and the West Coast ==
The overnight counterpart to the San Joaquin Daylight was the Owl, trains 57-58, between Oakland and Los Angeles, with sleeping cars and meal and beverage service. It was discontinued in 1965, three years before the Lark (direct to San Francisco itself) on the Coast Line ended. The West Coast (trains 59-60) carried overnight Sacramento-LA passengers until about 1960, though unlike the Sacramento Daylight it was a separate train all the way.

== See also ==
- Coast Daylight
- Gold Runner, Amtrak California's service to the Central Valley
- Sacramento Daylight
- Southern Pacific 4449 locomotive in "Daylight" paint scheme
