= Imperial (SP train) =

North American train line (1931-1967)

Overview
- Service type: Inter-city rail
- Status: Discontinued
- Locale: Midwestern United States/Southwestern United States/Baja California
- First service: 1931
- Last service: 1967
- Former operators: Chicago, Rock Island and Pacific Railroad; Southern Pacific Railroad

Route
- Termini: Chicago, Illinois; Los Angeles, California/San Diego, California
- Distance travelled: 2,361 miles (3,800 km)
- Service frequency: Daily
- Train number: Southwest: 39, Northeast: 40

On-board services
- Seating arrangements: Coaches
- Sleeping arrangements: Open sections, roommettes, drawing rooms and compartments
- Catering facilities: Dining car
- Baggage facilities: Baggage car

The Imperial was a night train of the Rock Island and the Southern Pacific. It operated from Chicago to Los Angeles, via Kansas City (Missouri) and Tucumcari (New Mexico).

== Route ==
Among the Southern Pacific passenger trains running from Arizona to southern California, it was distinctive for stopping in Mexico and for having an international branch running into Mexico a second time, stopping between Calexico and San Diego. In most of the Arizona section, it passes through an area acquired by the Gadsden Purchase.

The Imperial's main route ran west to Los Angeles. Heading west of Yuma it went into Mexico for two stops, then returned to Calexico; there, the main route continued to Los Angeles.

A southern branch split from the main route at Calexico on the San Diego Short Line. It crossed the Mexico–United States border, then made stops in Baja California at Mexicali, before returning to California, stopping in Calexico and El Centro. It then crossed into Mexico, stopping at Tijuana, and finally crossed to the United States to finish in San Diego.

The route had its origins as a local train between San Diego and Yuma. It was suspended from 1942 to 1946, as a result of World War II. Its service was truncated by 1958, continuing into 1967.

== Major stops ==
- Chicago (LaSalle Street Station)
- Rock Island
- Kansas City (Kansas City Union Station)
- Topeka (Great Overland Station)
- Tucumcari
- El Paso
- Tucson
- Phoenix
- Yuma
- Palm Springs
- Los Angeles (Union Station (Los Angeles))

San Diego Short Line branch:

- Mexicali
- Tijuana
- San Diego
