= Coolidge station =

Train station in Coolidge, Arizona, US

Coolidge, AZ
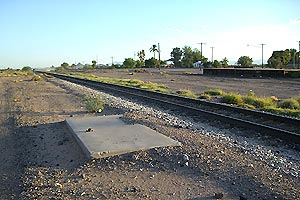
- Site of the former station in 2008

General information
- Location: 105 N. 1st Street; Coolidge, Arizona; United States
- Coordinates: 32°58′40.42″N 111°30′56.67″W
- Owner: City of Coolidge
- Line: UP Phoenix Subdivision

History
- Closed: June 3, 1996

Former services
| Preceding station | Amtrak | Following station |
|---|---|---|
| Tempe toward Los Angeles | Sunset Limited | Tucson toward Miami |
| Tempe toward Los Angeles | Texas Eagle | Tucson toward Chicago |
Location

Coolidge station was a train station in Coolidge, Arizona, served by Amtrak's Sunset Limited and Texas Eagle trains. Amtrak service to this station was discontinued in June 1996 when trains were rerouted to Maricopa.

As of 2023, Amtrak is planning to restore train service to Coolidge on a route between Phoenix and Tucson. The exact station location has yet to be determined. In addition, the FRA indicated in February 2023 that it was studying a re-route of the Sunset Limited from Maricopa back to Phoenix as part of the Long-Distance Service Study ordered by the Infrastructure Investment and Jobs Act. It is not known if the Sunset Limited would again stop in Coolidge.
