= Proposed commuter rail in the Phoenix metropolitan area =

Proposed rail infrastructure in the United States

There have been various proposals to bring commuter rail service to the Phoenix metropolitan area since at least the 1980s. A 2008 government plan, updated in 2018, proposes four lines running at 30-minute headways during peak hours and 2-hour headways during off-peak hours.

The commuter rail system would be complementary to the Phoenix–Tucson passenger rail project planned by the Arizona Department of Transportation and Amtrak.

== History ==
Daily rail service had existed until the 1960s between Phoenix, Glendale, and Wickenburg as well as Tempe and Mesa.

Contemporary discussion of commuter rail in Phoenix began with the "Hattie B." flood relief train of 1980, and was first widely promoted in 1991 by the Arizona Rail Passenger Association with the release of its Arizona Rail report.

== 2008 proposal ==
The Maricopa Association of Governments (MAG) and the Arizona Department of Transportation are studying suburban commuter rail as a complement to light rail. The MAG Commuter Rail Strategic Plan was released in March 2008.

In April 2008, a coalition of Arizona business and political leaders, including then-Governor Janet Napolitano, proposed a $42 billion state transit plan which would include commuter rail. Commuter rail would run along upgraded existing freight rail lines, with stations every three to five miles (4.8 to 8.0 km). In Phoenix, as in other areas that have implemented commuter rail, track speeds would be increased, signals updated, and additional sidings and double-track added. The plan did not make it to ballot as it failed to receive sufficient signatures due to a significant number of signatures being rejected.

== 2018 proposal ==
In October 2018, MAG issued an update to the 2010 study. This update removed the Chandler Corridor from a proposed commuter rail system, as it would have competed with San Tan Corridor Line for ridership. The Kyrene Line Corridor was also extended from its 2010-proposed terminus in West Chandler.

The 2018 update includes four rail corridors which would be operated with two services. The Grand/Kyrene Line would utilize the Grand Line Corridor, traveling from Wittmann southeast towards Phoenix, and then continuing south on the Kyrene Line Corridor to Chandler, traveling 53.8 miles (86.6 km) in 66–73 minutes. The Estrella/San Tan Line would use the Estrella Line Corridor, traveling from Buckeye east into Phoenix, and then continuing southeast along the San Tan Line Corridor to Queen Creek, traveling 61.4 miles (98.8 km) in 74–82 minutes.

The lines would overlap at four central stations: State Capital, Phoenix, Sky Harbor Airport, and Tempe. Provisions for extensions would allow for an additional Grand Avenue Corridor station in Wickenburg, two additional stations on the San Tan Line Corridor in San Tan Valley and Florence, and an extension of Estrella Line service to Arlington.

Services would run at 30-minute headways during peak hours and 2-hour headways during off-peak hours. By the year 2040, the Grand/Kyrene Line would have 10,850 daily boardings and the Estrella/San Tan Line would have 10,125 daily boardings.

The updated study estimated capital costs for rail systems using diesel multiple units (DMU) or push-pull trainsets (LHC). Capital costs assumed that service would share existing tracks with freight service (operated by Union Pacific Railroad and BNSF Railway), except for the overlapping segment in Phoenix, where there would be two tracks. All tracks would be certified for passenger trains to reach 80 miles per hour (130 km/h). Costs were estimated at $2.566 billion for DMU service and $2.521 billion for LHC service.

=== Lines ===
==== Grand Line Corridor ====
The Grand Line Corridor (formerly the Grand Avenue Corridor) is a 35-mile (56 km) line traveling from Union Station in Downtown Phoenix northwest to Wittmann. The corridor utilizes the BNSF Railway's Phoenix Subdivision, which already has sidings for passing trains but lacks any signals.

A trip by car from Union Station to Wittmann utilizing the parallel Grand Avenue (U.S. Route 60) is projected to take 120 minutes by 2040. The population of the surrounding areas of the line – Phoenix, Glendale, Peoria, Youngtown, El Mirage, Surprise, Sun City, Sun City West, and Wittmann – is projected to grow by 46% between 2015 and 2040. In particular, the city of Surprise is forecasted to grow by 152%.

The corridor will serve riders at various colleges and universities, including Arizona State University, Grand Canyon University, and Glendale Community College.

==== Estrella Line Corridor ====
The Estrella Line Corridor (formerly the Yuma West Corridor) is a 30-mile (48 km) line traveling from Union Station west to downtown Buckeye by way of the Union Pacific Railroad's Phoenix Subdivision. The line was served by Amtrak's Sunset Limited until June 1996, when it was rerouted to a more direct route via Maricopa rather than of Phoenix. Because of this, signals are already installed on the line and the line is already certified for passenger trains to operate at speeds of up to 60 miles per hour (97 km/h).

The population of the surrounding areas – Phoenix, Tolleson, Avondale, Goodyear, and Buckeye – is projected to grow by 63% between 2015 and 2040. In particular, Buckeye and Goodyear are forecasted to grow by 216% and 137%, respectively.

The corridor will serve the Goodyear Spring Training Complex and Phoenix Goodyear Airport, as well as the Palo Verde Nuclear Generating Station should a western extension of the corridor be built to Arlington.

==== San Tan Line Corridor ====
The San Tan Line Corridor (formerly the Southeast Corridor) is a 41-mile (66 km) line traveling from Union Station southeast to San Tan Valley by way of Union Pacific's Phoenix Subdivision. Like the Estrella Line Corridor, this corridor was formerly served by Amtrak until 1996 and is capable of handling passenger trains at up to 60 miles per hour (97 km/h). The line is a single track with sidings for passing trains.

The population of the surrounding areas – Phoenix, Scottsdale, Tempe, Mesa, Chandler, Gilbert, Queen Creek, and the Salt River Pima-Maricopa Indian Community – is projected to grow by 47% between 2015 and 2040. In particular, Queen Creek is forecasted to grow by 101%.

The corridor will serve airports at Sky Harbor and Mesa and the campuses of Arizona State University and East Valley Institute of Technology.

==== Kyrene Line Corridor ====
The Kyrene Line Corridor (formerly the Tempe Corridor) is a 18-mile (29 km) line from Union Station south to Wild Horse Pass Boulevard in the Gila River Indian Community by way of the Union Pacific Railroad's Chandler Industrial Lead . Like the San Tan Line and Estrella Line corridors, this corridor was formerly served by Amtrak until 1996. Signals are still present from Amtrak service and the line is currently a single track.

The population of the surrounding areas – Phoenix, Scottsdale, Tempe, Guadalupe, Chandler, and the Gila River Indian Community is projected to grow by 45% between 2015 and 2040. The greatest population growth is forecasted for the city of Tempe at 50%.

The line will serve Sky Harbor International Airport, the campuses of Arizona State University and the University of Phoenix, the Tempe Sports Complex, and the Wild Horse Pass Casino.

=== Phoenix Union Station ===
The 2010 and 2018 proposals call for a major expansion of the facilities at Phoenix Union Station. The station would have two island platforms for three through tracks and two additional island platforms for three termination tracks that would serve western service only.

== See also ==
- Commuter rail in North America
