= Tempe station (Arizona) =

Amtrak station in Tempe, Arizona

Tempe, AZ
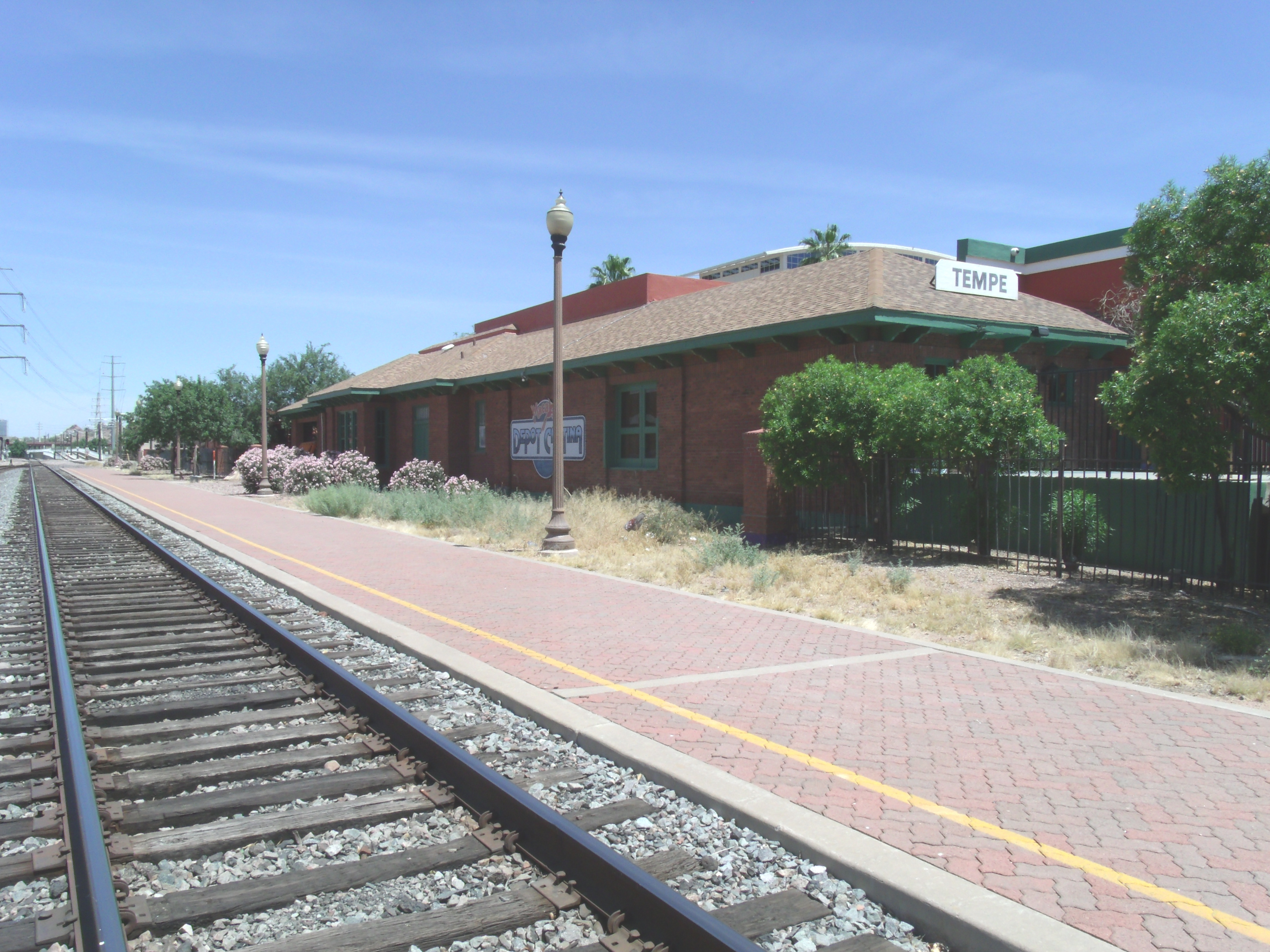
- Tempe station in May 2014

General information
- Location: 3rd Street and Ash Avenue; Tempe, Arizona; United States
- Coordinates: 33°25′40″N 111°56′37″W
- Owner: City of Tempe
- Line: UP Phoenix Subdivision

Other information
- Station code: Amtrak: TEM

History
- Opened: 1924
- Closed: June 3, 1996
- Rebuilt: 1987

Former services
Preceding station	Amtrak	Following station
Phoenix toward Los Angeles	Sunset Limited Until 1996 reroute	Coolidge toward Miami
Phoenix toward Los Angeles	Texas Eagle Until 1996 reroute	Coolidge toward Chicago
Preceding station	Southern Pacific Railroad	Following station
Phoenix toward Los Angeles	Sunset Route via Phoenix	Mesa toward New Orleans
Phoenix Terminus	Maricopa Branch	Hansen Junction toward Maricopa
Location

Tempe station is a former train station in Tempe, Arizona. Previously, Amtrak's Sunset Limited and Texas Eagle trains stopped at the station, but they were shifted to a more southerly route in June 1996. However, an Amtrak Thruway shuttle route connects the station to the Maricopa station on the new routing.

== History ==
The Southern Pacific Railroad built the depot in 1924.

The city of Tempe purchased the building in 1987 and renovated it. The station was served by Amtrak's Sunset Limited and Texas Eagle from 1987 until June 3, 1996, when Amtrak was forced to re-route the trains due to deteriorated track conditions on the secondary Union Pacific Railroad line which diverged from the mainline to serve Phoenix and Tempe. Amtrak opened the Maricopa station to serve Phoenix, Tempe and the greater Central Arizona area. After Amtrak left the station, Macayo's Depot Cantina, a Mexican restaurant, was built on the site, but the historic train depot was untouched.

On May 1, 2017, Amtrak started a new Amtrak Thruway shuttle service (operated by Stagecoach Express) connecting Tempe station and Phoenix Sky Harbor International Airport to Maricopa station.

In the early 2000s, the area saw the construction of several new rail lines. In 2008, the A Line of the Valley Metro Rail & Streetcar system opened with light rail trains running parallel to the Union Pacific tracks, and curving east onto 3rd Avenue just north of the historic train depot. On May 20, 2022, the Valley Metro Streetcar opened, with southbound cars passing right by the station site.

In January 2021, the city of Tempe approved a plan to redevelop the station site into a mixed-use development, which also will preserve and restore the train depot on the site. The development will include two towers: a 17-story office tower and a 18-story Hilton-branded hotel tower. The two towers will connect with a bridge over the light rail tracks.

As of 2023, Amtrak is planning to restore train service to Tempe on a route between Phoenix and Tucson. The exact station location has yet to be determined.

== See also ==
- Mill Avenue Bridges
