= Tucson station =

Amtrak station in Tucson, Arizona

Tucson, AZ
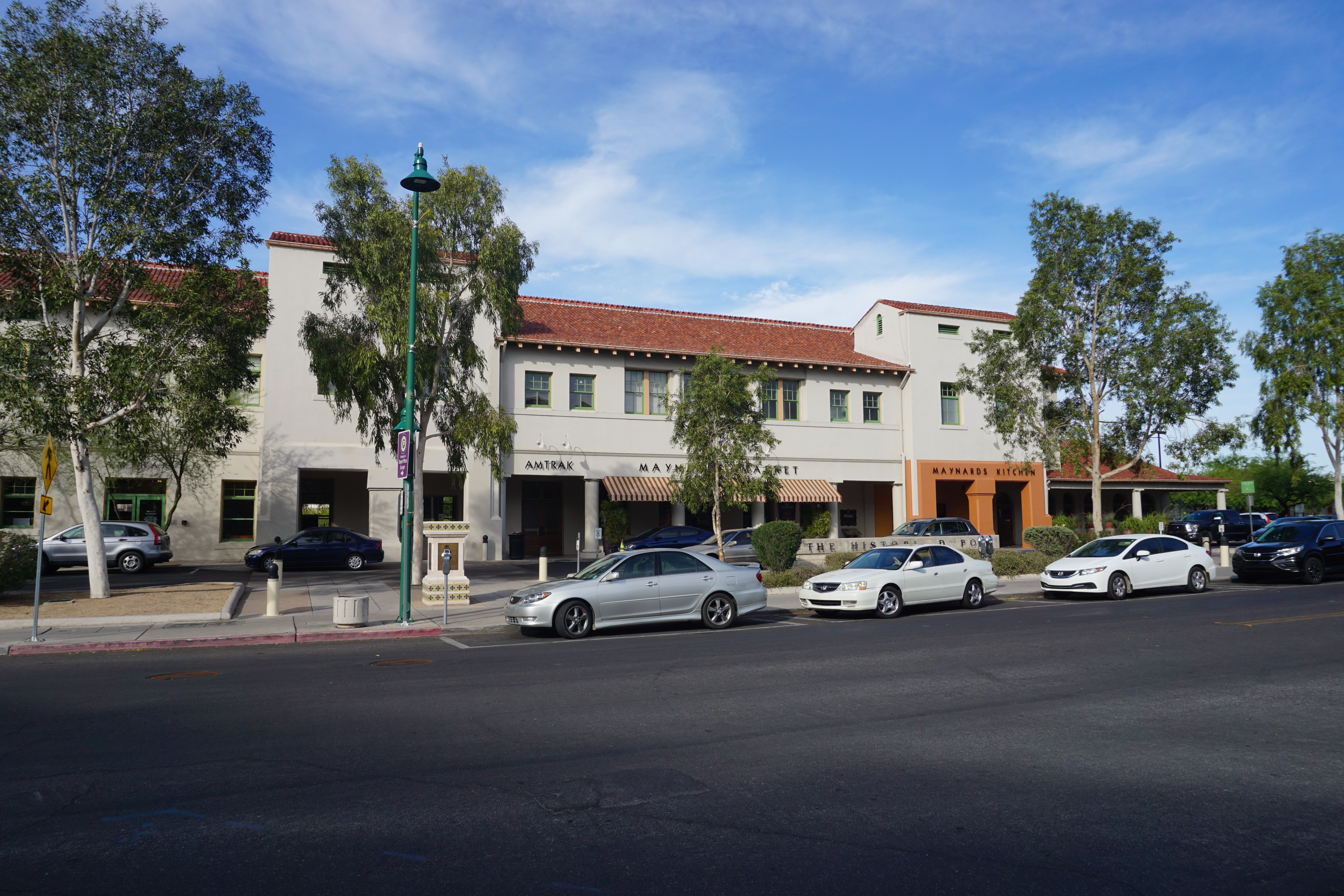

General information
- Location: 400 North Toole Avenue; Tucson, Arizona; United States
- Coordinates: 32°13′23″N 110°58′00″W
- Owner: City of Tucson
- Line: UP Gila Subdivision
- Platforms: 1 side platform
- Tracks: 2
- Connections: Sun Tran bus Sun Link streetcar

Construction
- Cycle facilities: Yes
- Accessible: Yes

Other information
- Station code: Amtrak: TUS

History
- Opened: 1907
- Rebuilt: 2004

Passengers
- FY 2025: 25,261 (Amtrak)

Services
Preceding station	Amtrak	Following station
Maricopa toward Los Angeles	Sunset Limited	Benson toward New Orleans
Maricopa toward Los Angeles	Texas Eagle	Benson toward Chicago
Former services
Preceding station	Amtrak	Following station
Tempe Until 1996 reroute toward Los Angeles	Sunset Limited	Benson toward Miami
Tempe Until 1996 reroute toward Los Angeles	Texas Eagle	Benson toward Chicago
Preceding station	Southern Pacific Railroad	Following station
Picacho toward Los Angeles	Sunset Route	Benson toward New Orleans
Location

Tucson station is an Amtrak train depot in Tucson, Arizona, served by six trains a week, or three per direction, by the combined Sunset Limited/Texas Eagle train.

== History ==
The depot was built in 1907 by the Southern Pacific Railroad (SP). It was designed by the SP's architect, Daniel J. Patterson, who designed a number of depots during the same era, including the San Antonio Station.

=== Passenger services ===
In the mid-20th century, into the latter 1950s, four trains a day departed west and four trains a day went east:

- Departing west toward Los Angeles Union Station via Yuma in the morning:
  - Argonaut (bypassed Phoenix to the south) (to ca. 1957)
  - Sunset Limited (passed through Phoenix) (continues to operate today)
- Departing west toward Los Angeles Union Station via Phoenix and Yuma in the mid-afternoon and the evening:
  - Imperial (to 1958)
  - Golden State (to 1968)
- Departing east toward Chicago's LaSalle Street Station via the Golden State Route in the midnight hours:
  - Imperial
  - Golden State
- Departing east toward New Orleans Union Station via the Sunset Route and Houston in the daylight morning hours:
  - Sunset Limited
  - Argonaut

=== Recent decades ===
In 1998, the City purchased the entire depot property from the Union Pacific Railroad, which had absorbed the SP. Restoration of the main depot building and the three adjacent buildings, to their 1941 modernized Spanish Colonial Revival architectural style, was completed in 2004. Spanish Colonial Revival elements include the stuccoed brick walls, red clay roof tiles, and colorful, decorative tilework in the waiting room. The station and other railroad buildings are included as contributing resources to the National Register-listed Tucson Warehouse Historic District.

The Old Pueblo Trolley extended their historic streetcar line to the depot in 2009. Sun Link assumed operation of the line on July 25, 2014. The Southern Arizona Transportation Museum is located in the old Records Vault building.

=== Proposed expansion ===
Tucson station is a proposed endpoint for planned train service to Phoenix.

== Wyatt Earp and Doc Holliday statue ==
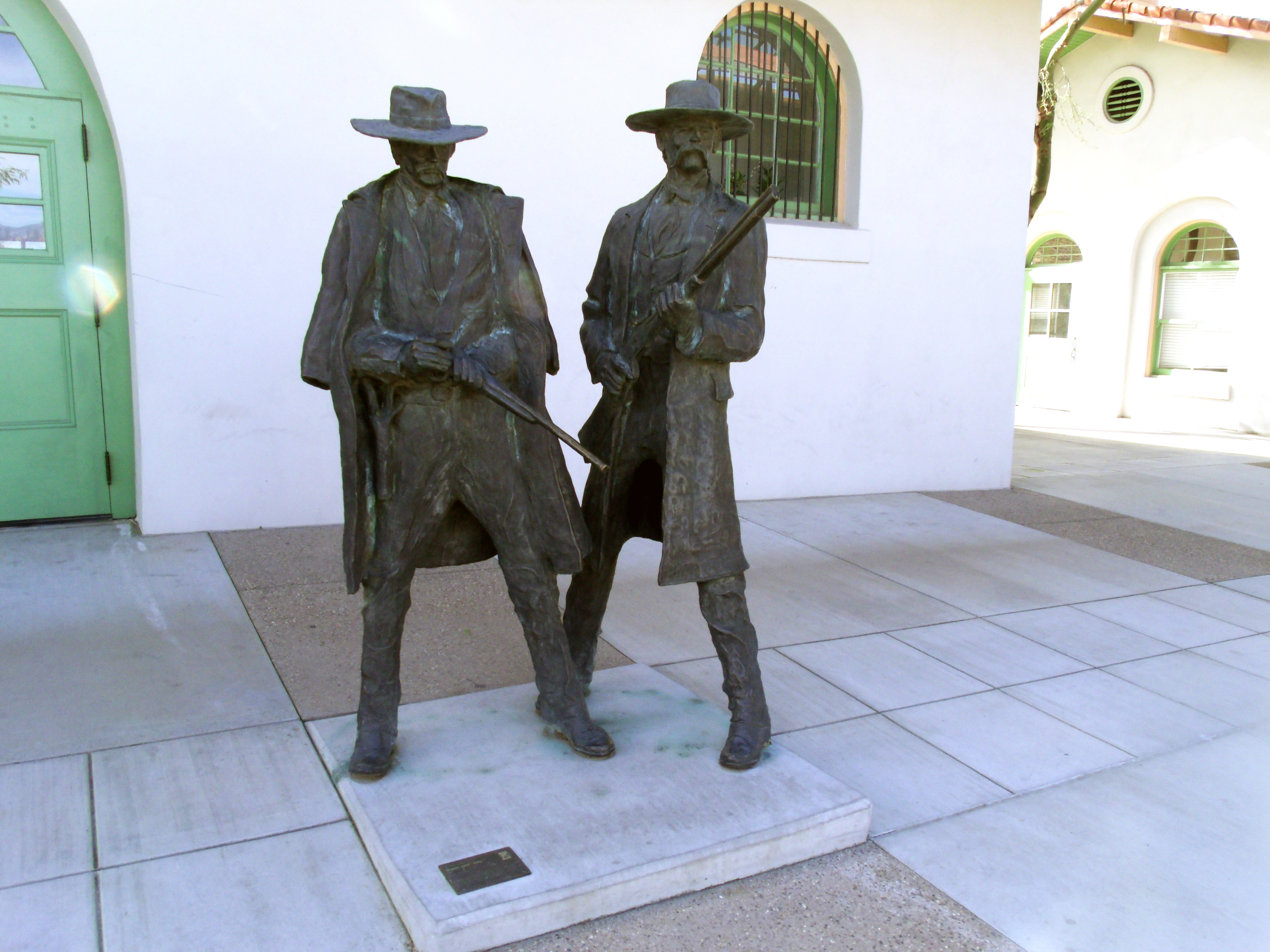
The Tucson Depot is where Frank Stilwell, suspected in the murder of Morgan Earp, was killed by Wyatt Earp in the company of Doc Holliday.

The Wyatt Earp and Doc Holliday statue near the train depot commemorates the revenge killing of Frank Stilwell. On March 18, 1882, in the aftermath of the Gunfight at the O.K. Corral, Morgan Earp was murdered by unknown killers, in Tombstone, Arizona. Two days later, Wyatt Earp, Doc Holliday, and a few other men were escorting the injured Virgil Earp and his wife to Tucson, with their final destination being California. While at the Tucson train station, Wyatt Earp learned that Frank Stilwell, one of the individuals suspected in the Morgan Earp murder, was lurking in the area. Earp, Holliday, and the others pursued Stilwell along the train tracks, eventually catching and killing him.
