= Phoenix station =

Phoenix station may refer to:

- Phoenix LRT station, a light rail station in Choa Chu Kang, Singapore
- Union Station (Phoenix, Arizona), a former Amtrak station in Arizona, United States
- Valley Metro Rail & Streetcar stations in Phoenix, Arizona
- Phoenix station (Indiana), a former Chesapeake and Ohio station in Indiana, United States
