= Benson station =

Amtrak station in Cochise County, Arizona, US

Benson, AZ
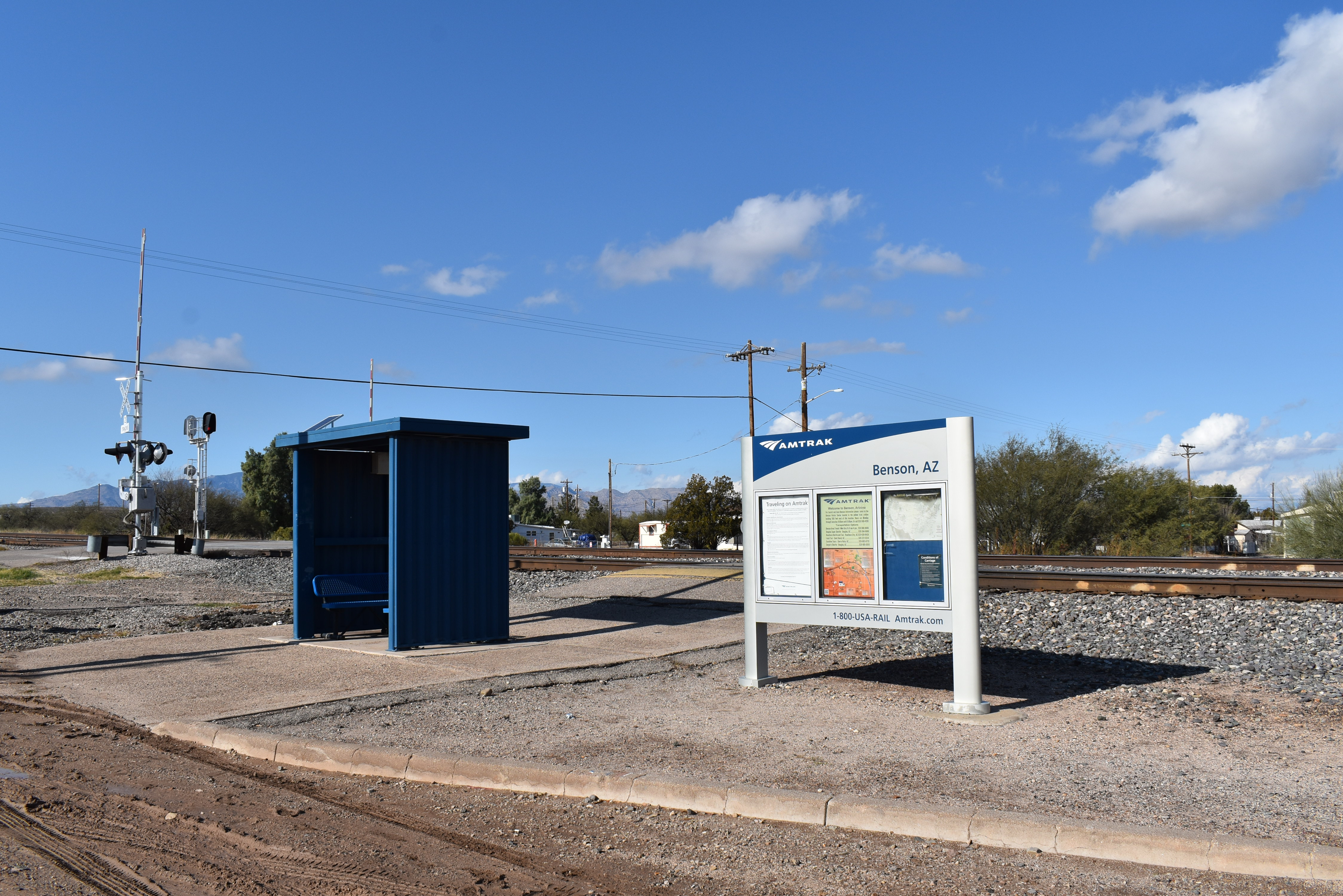
- Benson station in December 2022

General information
- Location: 105 East 4th Street; Benson, Arizona; United States
- Coordinates: 31°58′08″N 110°17′50″W
- Line: UP Lordsburg Subdivision
- Platforms: Short accessible
- Tracks: 2
- Connections: Benson Area Transit; Greyhound Lines

Construction
- Parking: Yes
- Accessible: Yes

Other information
- Status: Unstaffed, flag stop
- Station code: Amtrak: BEN

Passengers
- FY 2025: 2,196 (Amtrak)

Services
Preceding station	Amtrak	Following station
Tucson toward Los Angeles	Sunset Limited	Lordsburg toward New Orleans
Tucson toward Los Angeles	Texas Eagle	Lordsburg toward Chicago
Former services
Preceding station	Southern Pacific Railroad	Following station
Tucson toward Los Angeles	Sunset Route	Cochise toward New Orleans
Location

Benson station is a train station in Benson, Arizona. It is served by Amtrak's Sunset Limited and Texas Eagle, which pass through Benson 3 days a week in each direction. There are no facilities for Amtrak passengers other than a small metal shelter. The nearby Southern Pacific Railroad Depot replica building has been used as a tourist information center. The building is also the location of bus stops for Benson Area Transit and Greyhound.

The station is a flag stop, served only when passengers have tickets to and from the station. The platform is being rebuilt in 2024 as part of Amtrak's effort to comply with the Americans with Disabilities Act.
