= Maricopa station =

Train station in Maricopa, Pinal County, Arizona

Maricopa, AZ
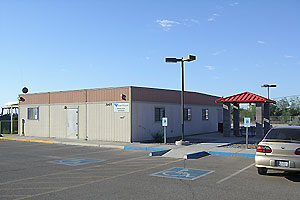
- The station building in 2008

General information
- Location: 19427 North John Wayne Parkway; Maricopa, Arizona; United States
- Coordinates: 33.056353°N 112.047372°W
- Owner: Amtrak and Pinal County
- Line: UP Gila Subdivision
- Platforms: 1 side platform
- Tracks: 2
- Connections: Amtrak Thruway to Tempe and Phoenix Airport

Construction
- Parking: Yes
- Accessible: Yes

Other information
- Station code: Amtrak: MRC

History
- Opened: July 4, 1887 (SP); October 29, 2001 (Amtrak)
- Closed: August 18, 1961 (SP)
- Rebuilt: c. 1930s
- Original company: Southern Pacific; Maricopa and Phoenix Railroad

Passengers
- FY 2025: 14,830 (Amtrak)

Services
Preceding station	Amtrak	Following station
Yuma toward Los Angeles	Sunset Limited	Tucson toward New Orleans
Yuma toward Los Angeles	Texas Eagle	Tucson toward Chicago
Former services
Preceding station	Southern Pacific Railroad	Following station
Gila toward Los Angeles	Sunset Route	Casa Grande toward New Orleans
Sacate toward Phoenix	Maricopa Branch	Terminus
Location

Maricopa station is an Amtrak train station in Maricopa, Arizona, United States, serving Phoenix and central Arizona. The station accommodates travelers who use the combined Sunset Limited and Texas Eagle, which operates three times per week in each direction between Los Angeles and Chicago or New Orleans. Amtrak Thruway service (operated by Stagecoach Express) is available between Maricopa station, Tempe station and Phoenix Sky Harbor International Airport.

== Operations ==
Maricopa station has a very short platform (just over 110 feet [34 m] long) only slightly longer than each Superliner car used by Amtrak. This arrangement forces train crews to make as many as four separate stops in order to load and unload passengers from various sections of the train. Prior to the overpass being built in 2019, the platform's close proximity to Arizona State Route 347 could block traffic on the highway for more than 15 minutes.

== History ==
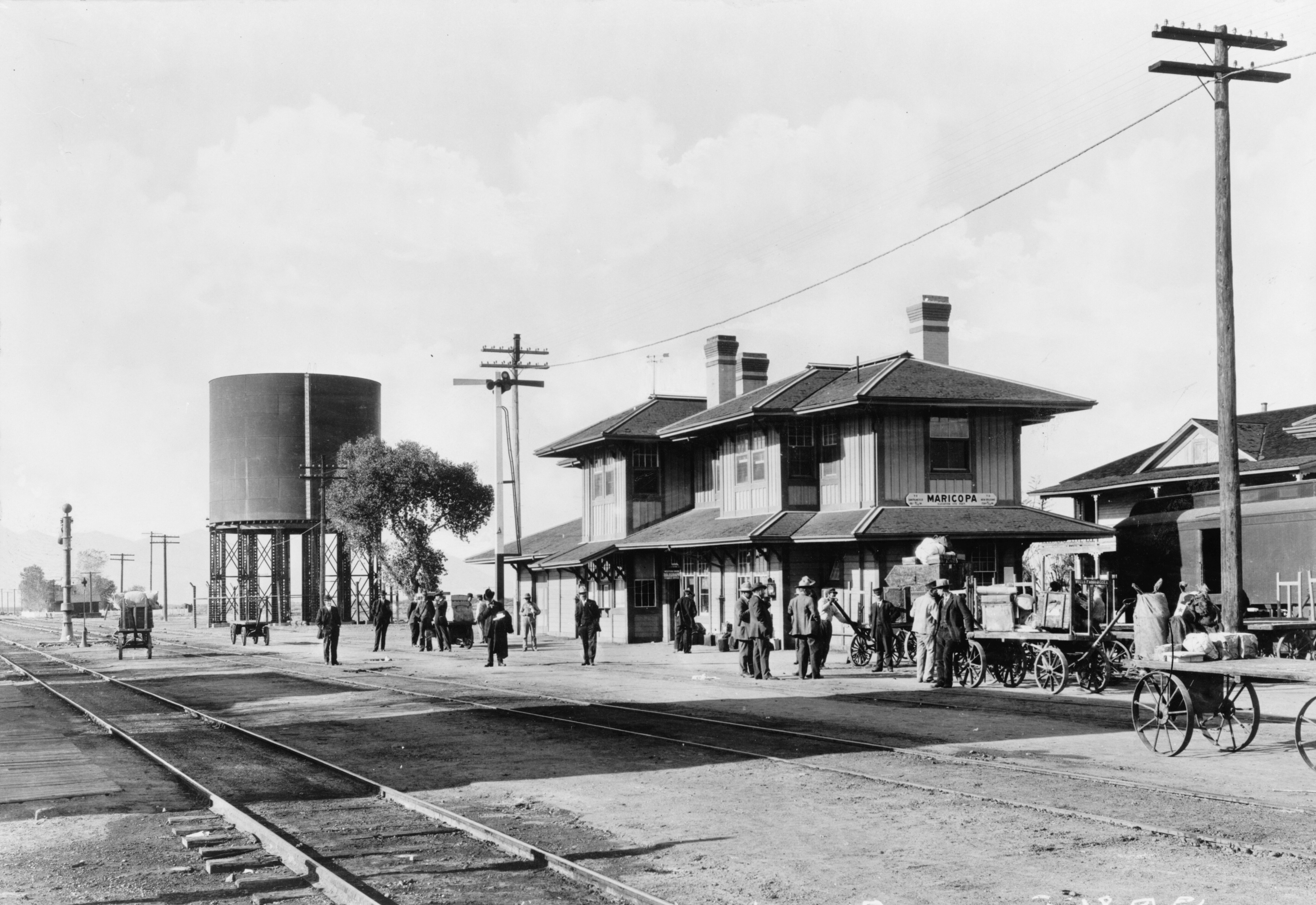
Southern Pacific's original Maricopa station, 1900

The town of Maricopa was moved twice to accommodate rail access. Originally settled as Maricopa Wells, the town was moved 8 miles (13 km) south in the 1880s to the alignment of the new Southern Pacific Sunset Route which planned to run between Los Angeles and New Orleans. This was the site of Maricopaville, later renamed to Heaton, which was intended to be the junction of a railroad to Phoenix. After Tempe lobbied to be placed on the new railroad's alignment, the town was moved again 3 miles (4.8 km) to the east where the new junction would actually be built. Maricopa station opened on July 4, 1887 with the commencement of service to Phoenix along the Maricopa and Phoenix Railroad. The first station building was two stories tall with brick chimneys. After the Phoenix cutoff opened in 1926, Mariposa's importance as a transfer point greatly diminished. The station building was replaced in the 1930s with a small clapboard structure. The station would close on August 18, 1961. The building was purchased by a local family and moved to their residence until it was moved to the McCormick-Stillman Railroad Park (Note: 33.5367°N 111.9228°W) in Scottsdale in 2003.

In 1996, Amtrak was forced to withdraw from Phoenix Union Station due to deteriorated track conditions on the secondary Union Pacific Railroad line which diverged from the mainline to serve Phoenix. Plans were put forward to reactivate a station at Maricopa to serve as a bus transfer point. One initial scheme involved acquiring the old Southern Pacific station in Rillito and relocating it to Maricopa. Issues with access to Maricopa Road and subsequent land leasing negotiations with Union Pacific stalled the project until 1999, when design and construction recommenced. In 1999, a Chicago, Burlington and Quincy Railroad dome car, "The Silver Horizon" that was previously used on the California Zephyr, was moved to the site to be refurbished for use as the station office. A nearby rail accident prompted Union Pacific to call for further safety reviews, and final construction commenced in March 2001, and the station would open on October 29. Amtrak discontinued its bus between Phoenix and Tucson, but did not provide any new accommodation between Phoenix and Maricopa. The old railcar would eventually prove unsuitable, and Amtrak moved the modular buildings that were previously used during the Tucson station remodeling to Maricopa. The historic dome car remained on the station site on static display.

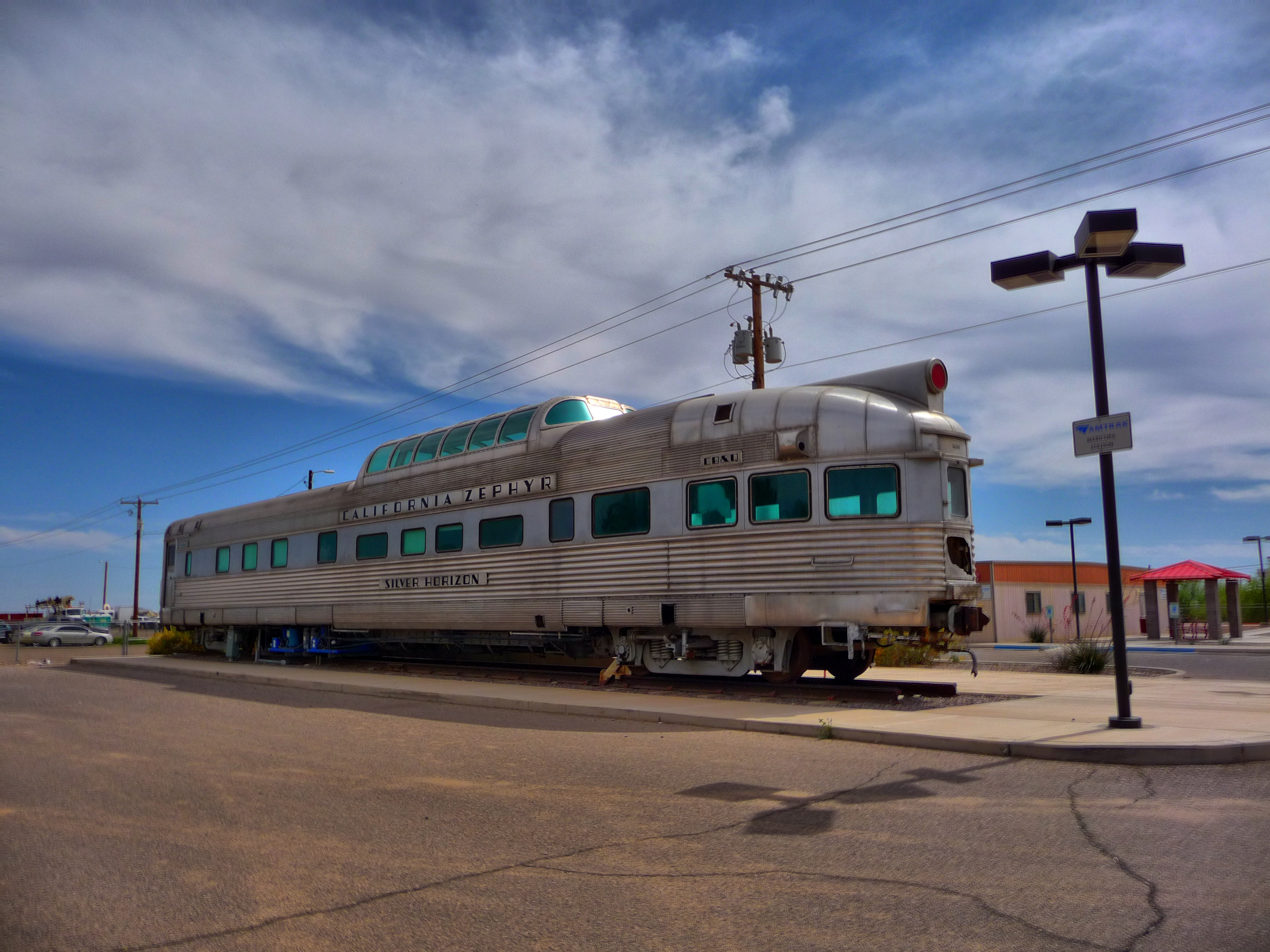
Chicago, Burlington and Quincy Railroad dome car "The Silver Horizon", used as the station between 2001 and 2005.

On May 1, 2017, Amtrak started a new Amtrak Thruway shuttle service (operated by Stagecoach Express) connecting Maricopa station with Tempe station and Phoenix Sky Harbor International Airport.

The city of Maricopa and Union Pacific Railroad studied moving the station west onto a siding on city-owned property in 2012, but the cost was projected at $4.2 million, (Note: $5.89 million in 2025 adjusted for inflation) which the city was unwilling to pay. The project was replaced with a plan to build a new overpass that would carry SR 347 over the railroad tracks. The $55 million (Note: $73.8 million in 2025 adjusted for inflation) project was funded with grants received from the federal government, as well as in part by the City of Maricopa, the Arizona Department of Transportation, and the Union Pacific Railroad. As part of the project, the dome car was moved from the station to a location 0.25-mile (0.40 km) down the Maricopa-Casa Grande Highway (Note: 33.0544°N 112.0427°W) on January 10, 2019.

Amtrak has suggested direct rail service could return to Phoenix by 2035, possibly ending service to Maricopa.
