= 1995 Palo Verde, Arizona, derailment =

Railway accident caused by sabotage

Coordinates: 33.211862°N 113.015445°W

Palo Verde derailment
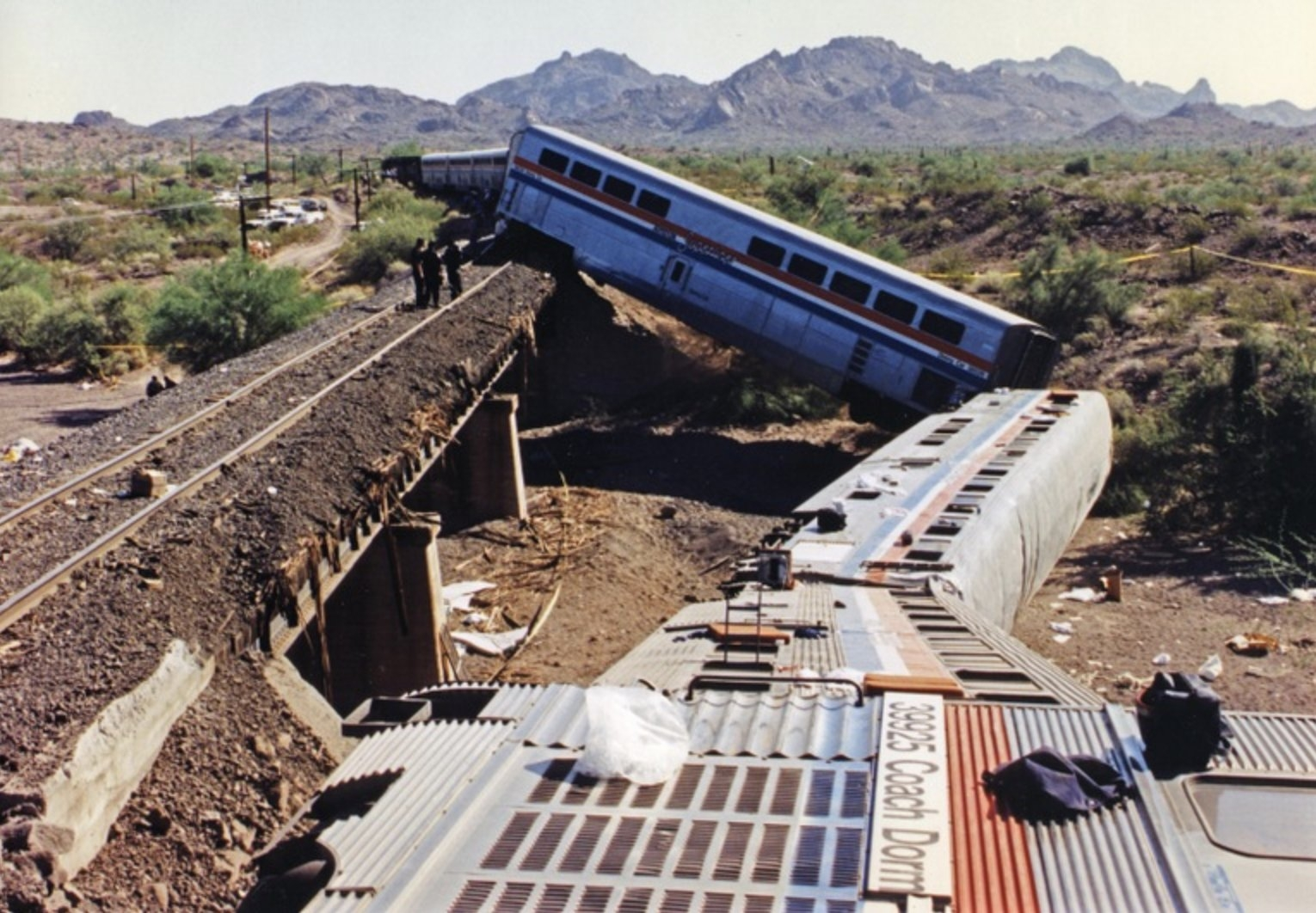
- Location: Palo Verde, Arizona
- Date: October 9, 1995; 31 years ago
- Target: Amtrak Sunset Limited
- Attack type: Train derailment caused by sabotage
- Deaths: 1
- Injuries: 78
- Perpetrator: Unknown
- Motive: Potentially retaliation for the Waco Siege

The 1995 Palo Verde derailment took place on October 9, 1995, when Amtrak's Sunset Limited was derailed by terrorists near Palo Verde, Arizona on Southern Pacific Railroad tracks. Two locomotives, Amtrak GE P32-8BWH #511 leading and EMD F40PHR #398 trailing, and eight of twelve cars derailed, four of them falling 30 feet (9 m) off a trestle bridge into a dry river bed. Mitchell Bates, a sleeping car attendant, was killed. Seventy-eight people were injured, 12 of them seriously and 25 were hospitalized.

== Incident ==
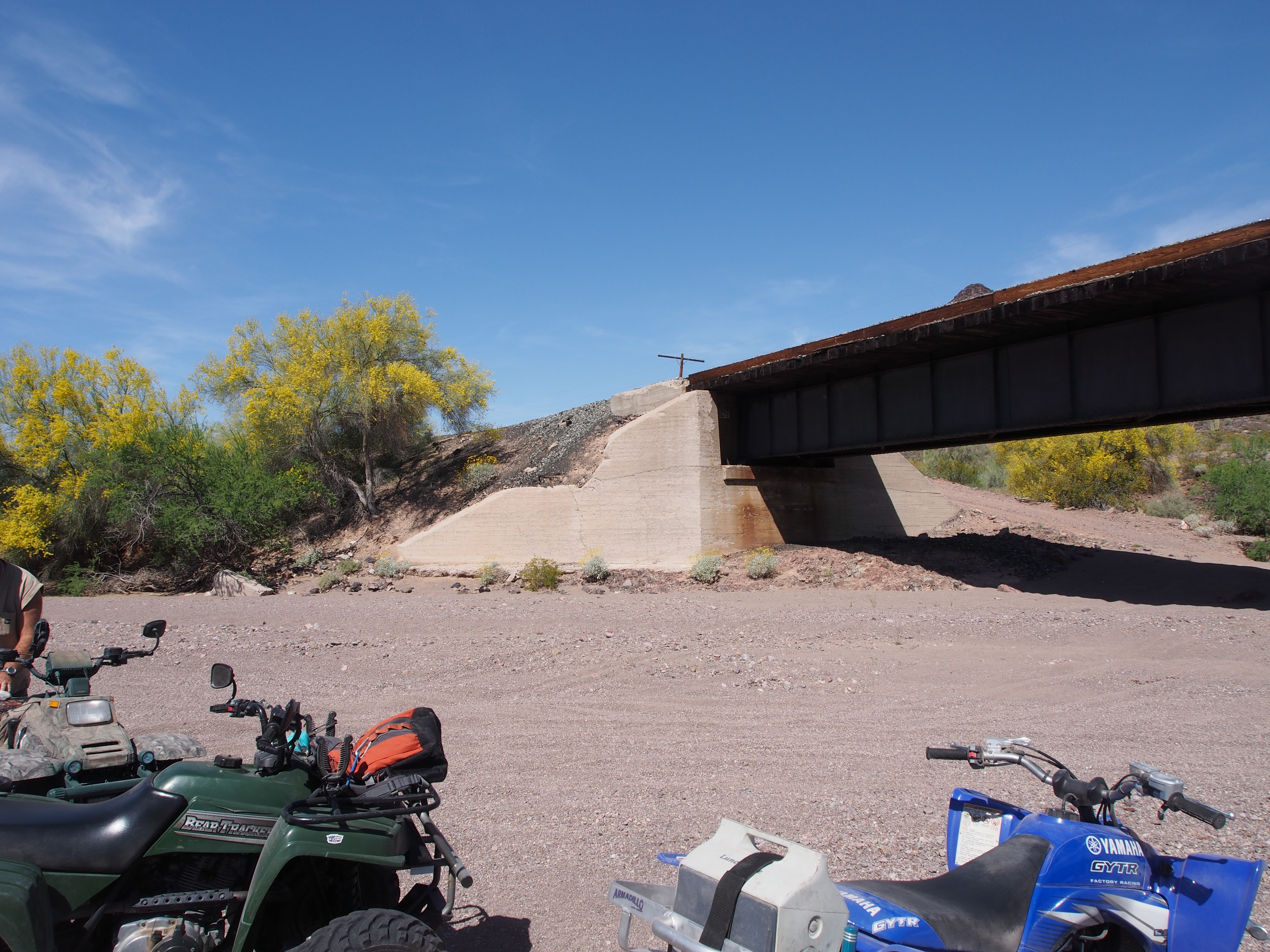
The site of the derailment in 2013. The large gouge in the embankment was created by the impact of the train.

Four typewritten notes, attacking the ATF and the FBI for the 1993 Waco Siege, criticizing local law enforcement, and signed "Sons of the Gestapo", were found near the scene of the wreck, indicating that notes had been left nearby. All four notes were identical, and read:

Indictment of the ATF and FBI:

Before dawn the women awoke to say their morning prayers. The women slept upstairs. They lit their kerosene lamps because the electricity had been turned off by the FBI. After observing lights in all the upstairs windows, the FBI ordered the teargas bombardment. Afterwards, only two upstairs windows were lit. The location of each was recorded. Over the next few hours ventilation holes were poked in the walls. These holes made the fire burn very much faster. Otherwise the fire department would have had time to put out the fire before the women and children died in the flames. At noon, the light from the two kerosene lamps was obscured by bright sunlight. Everyone had forgotten about them except the man who carried their locations written on a scrap of paper in his pocket. He ordered the tank drivers where to crash through. Guess under which two windows. He ordered them to raise their guns, as they backed out, the guns were lowered. The video tape shows clearly the floor being raised by the (word unintelligible) a foot and a half. Guess what happened to the kerosene lamps in (word unintelligible) rooms above the tanks. A minute afterwards, black smoke started to pour out of the windows where the lamps had burned. This is the normal time needed for a kerosene fire to build up.

Who is policing the ATF, FBI, state troopers, county sheriffs and local police? What federal law enforcement agency investigates each and every choke hold killing committed by a police officer? Each and every beating of a drunk wether (sic) or not a passerby videotapes it? Each and every shooting of a police officer's wife who knows too much about drug kickbacks? Each and every killing at Ruby Ridge? The Gestapo accounts to no one. This is not Nazi Germany. All these people had rights. It is time for an independent federal agency to police the law enforcement agencies and other government employees.

Sons of the Gestapo

SOG.

One of the notes was found by Neal Hallford, a passenger traveling from Oklahoma to San Diego.

It was found that the rails had been shifted out of position to cause the derailment, but only after they had been connected with wires. This kept the track circuit closed, circumventing safety systems designed to warn locomotive engineers of track problems, and suggested that the saboteurs had a working knowledge of railroads. The attack was likened to the 1939 wreck of the City of San Francisco, in which a similar method killed 24 people.

Following the incident, Amtrak President Thomas Downs told CNN that improved monitoring and security measures have greatly reduced the chances of a similar incident.

After 1996, the Sunset Limited was rerouted to south of Phoenix (approaching no closer than Maricopa) due to the desire of Union Pacific to abandon this stretch of track for its through trains between southern New Mexico and southern California. The section of track, now known as the Roll Industrial Lead of the Phoenix Subdivision, on which the derailment took place is now used as storage track only.

== Media coverage ==
The cause of this wreck has been explored in a couple of major documentaries, including: Why Trains Crash: Blood on the Tracks, “Investigative Reports: Danger on the Rails” and Derailed: America's Worst Train Wrecks.

It has also been featured on the May 10, 1996, episode of Unsolved Mysteries. and Parcasts’ Conspiracy Theories podcast on Spotify on April 17, 2024.

== Investigation ==
The case received a "major case" investigation dubbed SPLITRAIL and remains officially unsolved. The FBI dispatched 90 agents to the crime scene, many of whom were removed from the Kingman investigative branch of the Oklahoma City Bombing investigation. Timothy McVeigh had lived in Kingman with Michael Fortier, who was interviewed in the investigation.

On December 14, 1995, the FBI raided the Val Verde home of a railroad salvage company executive, John Ernest Olin, in connection with the investigation. Olin had business disputes with BNSF and Apache Railway, but the train involved in the derailment was an Amtrak train running on Southern Pacific tracks. Olin denied ever visiting the area of the derailment and was released.

The journalist Will Grigg interviewed an electrical engineer who claimed to have known members of a neo-Nazi drug trafficking syndicate associated with McVeigh in Anaheim. According to the electrical engineer, McVeigh taught his associates how to derail trains, and the derailment was "carried out by some of the people who helped McVeigh build the bomb for Oklahoma City." Those associates per journalist Mark S. Hamm were the Aryan Republican Army, who went by the name "King of Kings" and plotted train derailments. ARA member Richard Guthrie wrote in his memoir that another member, Mark Thomas, wanted to organize the organization into cells, one of which would derail trains.

In 2003, an FBI Inspector General audit revealed SPLITRAIL ranked the 15th largest case between October 1995 and June 2002.

On April 10, 2015, the Phoenix office of the FBI announced a reward of $310,000 (equivalent to $421,000 in 2025) for information about the derailment leading to the capture of those responsible. The reward was still outstanding as of 2020.

== See also ==
- List of unsolved murders (1980–1999)
- Oklahoma City bombing
