= Union Station (Phoenix, Arizona) =

Historic railway station

Phoenix Union Station
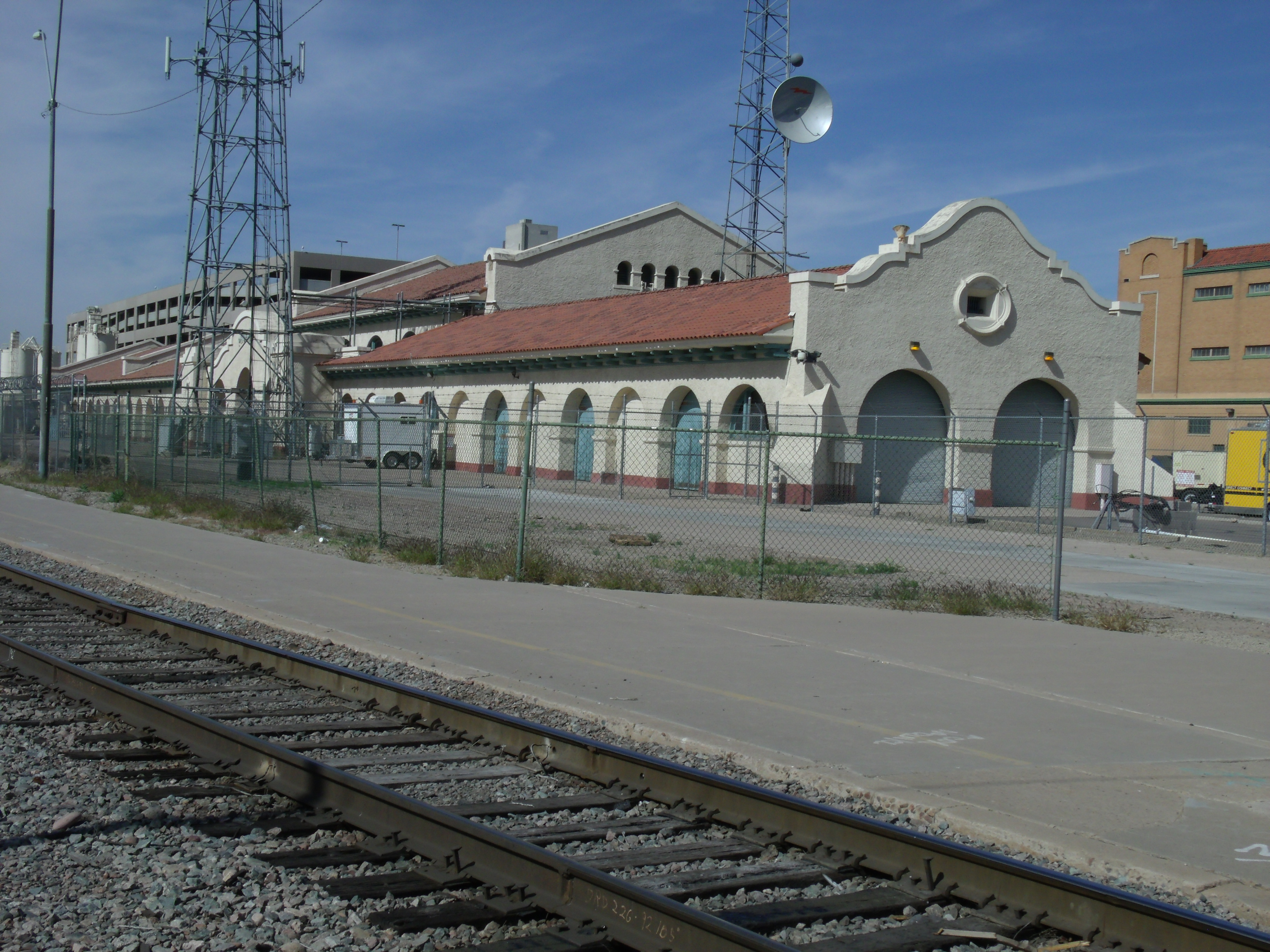
- The station in 2014.

General information
- Location: 401 W. Harrison St. Phoenix, Arizona; United States
- Coordinates: 33°26′39″N 112°04′44″W
- Owner: Sprint Corporation
- Line: UP Phoenix Subdivision
- Tracks: 1

History
- Opened: 1923
- Closed: June 3, 1996

Former services
Preceding station	Amtrak	Following station
Yuma toward Los Angeles	Sunset Limited Until 1996 reroute	Tempe toward Miami
Yuma toward Los Angeles	Texas Eagle Until 1996 reroute	Tempe toward Chicago
Preceding station	Atchison, Topeka and Santa Fe Railway	Following station
Mobest toward Ash Fork	Santa Fe, Prescott and Phoenix Railway	Terminus
Preceding station	Southern Pacific Railroad	Following station
Tolleson toward Wellton	Wellton – Hayden	Scottsdale toward Hayden
- Union Station
- U.S. National Register of Historic Places
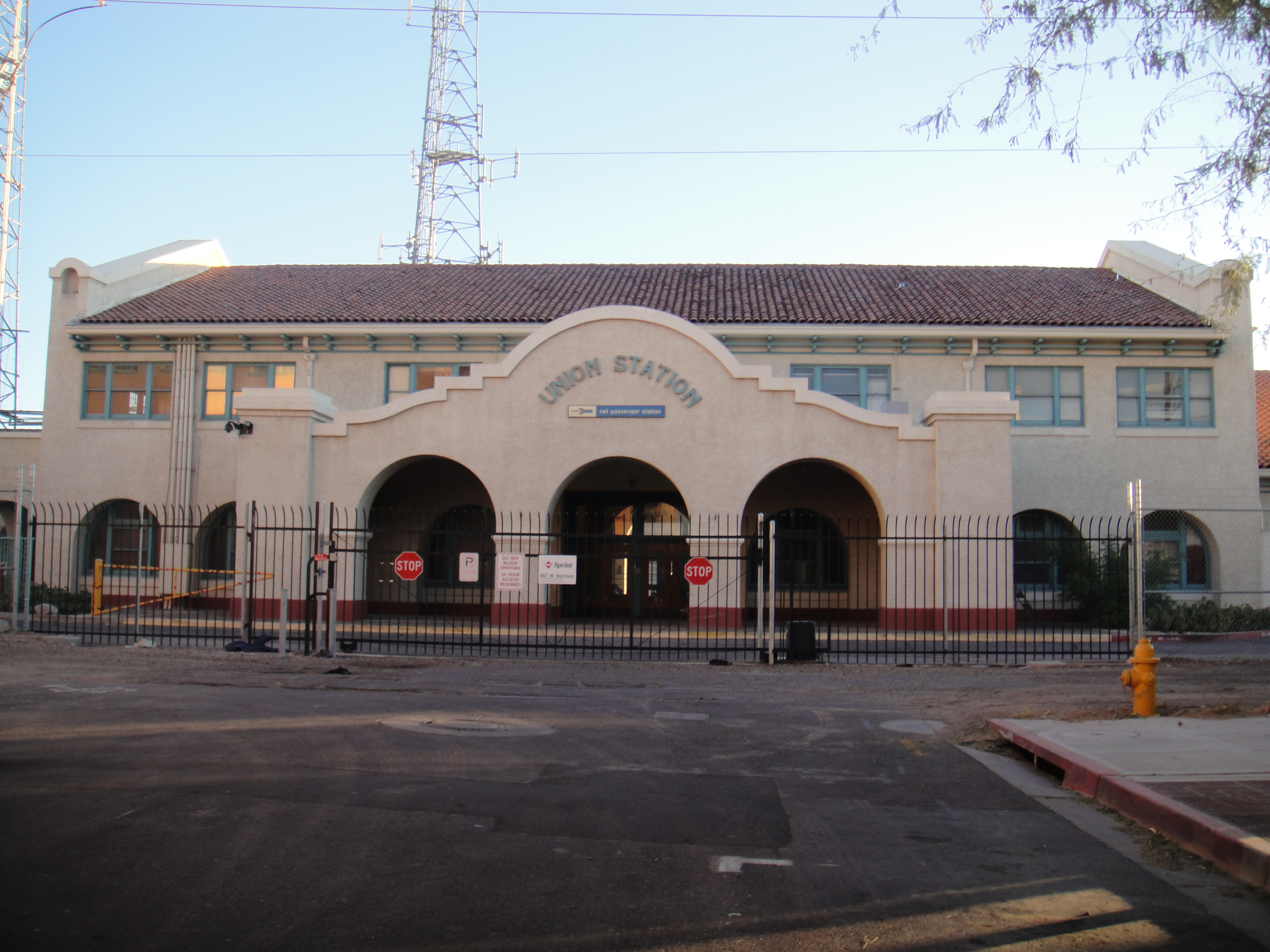
- North Side of Union Station Phoenix, Arizona

- Location within Arizona Location within the United States
- Location: Fourth Ave. and Southern Pacific RR tracks, Phoenix, Arizona
- Area: 1 acre (0.40 ha)
- Built: 1923
- Architect: Peter Kiewit
- Architectural style: Mission Revival
- MPS: Phoenix Commercial MRA
- NRHP reference No.: 85003056
- Added to NRHP: November 25, 1985
Location

Phoenix Union Station is a former train station at 401 South 4th Avenue in downtown Phoenix, Arizona, United States. From 1971 to 1996 it was an Amtrak station. Until 1971, it was a railroad stop for the Santa Fe and Southern Pacific Railroads. Union Station was served by Amtrak's Los Angeles–New Orleans Sunset Limited and Los Angeles–Chicago Texas Eagle. The station is on the National Register of Historic Places.

== Architecture ==
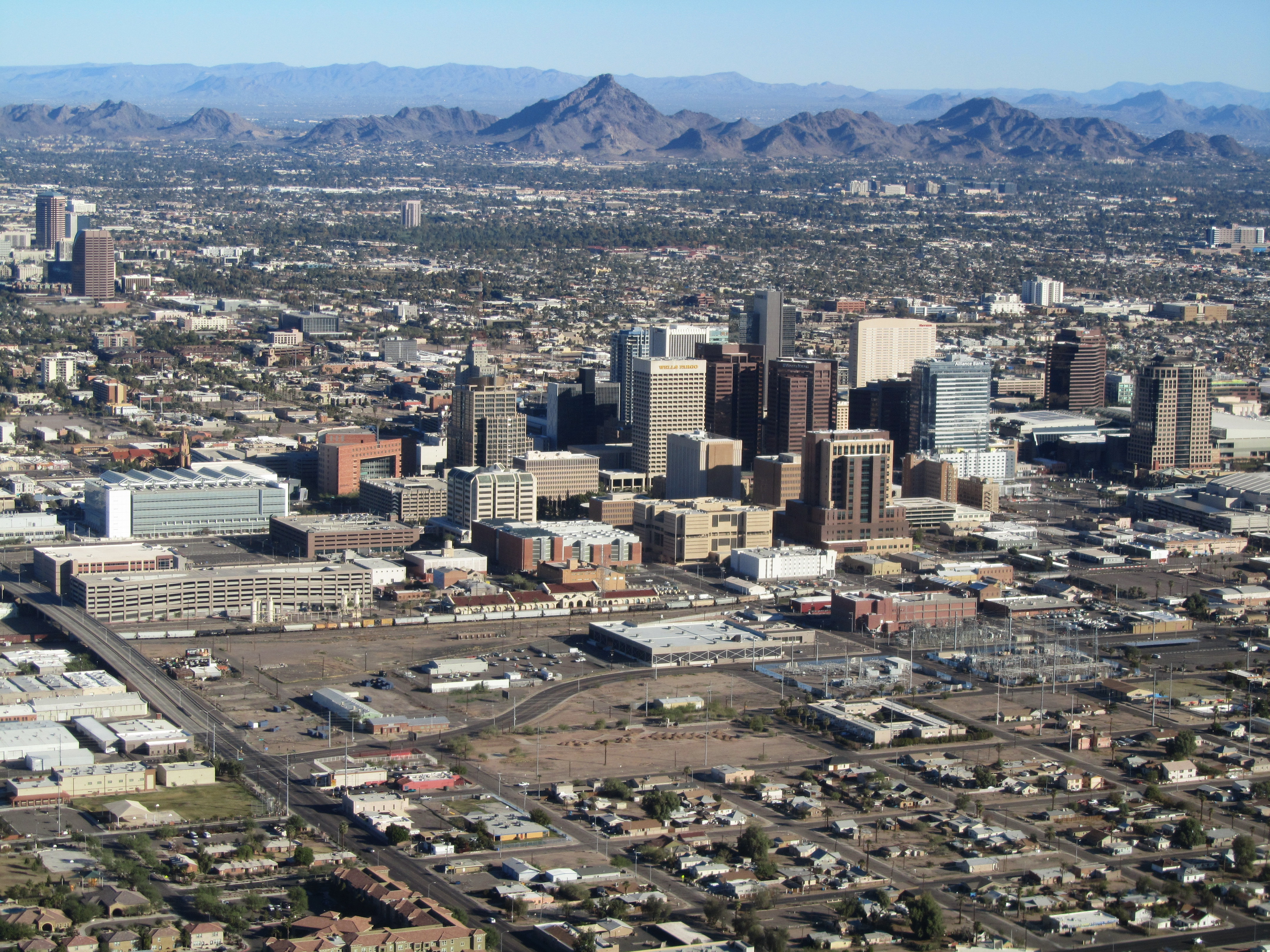
Phoenix Union Station (center) anchors the south end of downtown

Phoenix Union Station was constructed in 1923 by the Santa Fe and the Arizona Eastern (Southern Pacific) Railroads. The Station is one of the best examples of Mission Revival architecture, along with Brophy College Preparatory, in Phoenix. The Mission Revival style, a popular building style between 1890 and the 1920s, was typified by such Union Station features as stucco wall finishes, arcades, red tiled roofs, curvilinear gables, massive piers, and impost moldings.

According to the "Phoenix Historic Building Survey" by the Phoenix City Council, September 1979:

Historic Name
Union Station of the Southern Pacific and Santa Fe Railroads
Description
A large Mission Revival railroad station with a central two-story waiting room structure between long, low arcaded wings. Red-tiled, gabled roofs are terminated by high parapet walls that are shaped with the familiar curves of the Mission Revival at the ends of the wings and in entrance pavilions at both the railroad and street sides of the central pavilion. In keeping with the character of the Mission Revival there are few other decorative details.

The waiting room is a high, beamed space with original wooden furnishings and particularly fine ceiling light fixtures. There have been some alterations in the waiting room, and the arcaded wings which were originally open as passenger waiting areas have been enclosed. A microwave transmitting tower next to the central pavilion is out of harmony with the structure ...

Significance
Union Station was a joint venture between the Southern Pacific and Santa Fe Railroad Companies and was designed by their architect, Peter Kiewit. Dedicated on September 30, 1923, the building was proclaimed a "Monument to the progressiveness and prosperity of the valley and a testimony of the confidence in the future of the Salt River Valley and Phoenix."
A milestone in Phoenix's development, Union Station ushered in tourism on a grand scale and promoted greater national visibility.

== History ==
Rob Bohannan presented this history at ARPA's dedication of the clock and plaque donated by ARPA members, January 11, 1992. Used with permission:

Phoenix Union Station was commissioned on September 16, 1922, by the Arizona Eastern Railroad Company, a Southern Pacific affiliate, and by the California, Arizona and Santa Fe Railroad, then part of the Santa Fe Railway system and was built by the Robert E. McKee Construction Company. Construction of this union station was the result of an order by the Arizona Corporation Commission to the railroads to consolidate their separate station facilities located several blocks apart in downtown Phoenix.

The main station building is 475 feet long and 74 feet wide. The adjoining Post Office building is 78 feet long and 62 feet wide. The mission revival style building is constructed of structural steel and reinforced concrete and was completed at a cost of $556,000.

Three years after the station was completed, the new Southern Pacific main line through Phoenix was opened with the arrival of the eastbound Californian on November 15, 1926. After the track was fully seasoned, the Golden State and Sunset Limited served the station beginning March 20 of the following year. Prior to this, the only access to SP's transcontinental trains was via connecting trains on the old Maricopa and Phoenix Railroad at Maricopa.

When rail travel was at its peak during and immediately after World War II, Phoenix Union Station was served by as many as eighteen trains a day. A pair of Santa Fe trains arrived and departed for Parker, Barstow, and Los Angeles, while the fondly remembered Hassayampa Flyer connected Phoenix with the Southern Transcon and Santa Fe's great transcontinental trains to and from the east.

Southern Pacific operated the Sunset Limited between Los Angeles and New Orleans, the service which continues under Amtrak today (NOTE: rerouted away from Phoenix proper in 1996, in favor of Maricopa). The Sunset Limited had through cars to Dallas and St. Louis by way of the Texas and Pacific connection at El Paso. In conjunction with the Rock Island, Southern Pacific operated the Golden State Limited, together with several lesser trains on the Los Angeles–Phoenix–Chicago route. From December 1940 to April 1941, and from December 1941 to April 1942, Rock Island and Southern Pacific operated the deluxe Arizona Limited between Phoenix and Chicago. In April 1964, the Sunset Limited and the Golden State were combined between Los Angeles and El Paso. The Golden State made its last run in February, 1968. The Hassayampa was discontinued in April of the following year.

Until superseded by Phoenix Sky Harbor International Airport sometime in the fifties, Phoenix Union Station was the undisputed gateway to the city. This station served millions of arriving and departing passengers during the fifty-nine years since it was completed. This station has also played host to many special occasions and celebrations. The two having the largest recorded attendance is the Main Line celebration on Friday, October 15, 1926, and the second day of Phoenix Union Station Days, Sunday, February 24, 1991. On both days over ten thousand persons gathered to celebrate the importance of this great building and the invaluable service it has provided.

In 1995, the last full year Amtrak stopped at Union Station, 21,495 passengers boarded or alighted here.

Since Amtrak left in 1996, the Olympic Torch train has stopped here twice, and tourist trains like the GrandLuxe (formerly American Orient Express) have also occasionally used Union Station.

In 2000, the Arizona Department of Transportation and the Arizona Rail Passenger Association presented "Transpo 2000," an exposition of a modern Talgo trainset at Union Station.

=== Historic designations ===
- National Register of Historic Places #NPS 85003056
- Phoenix City Register

== Current services ==
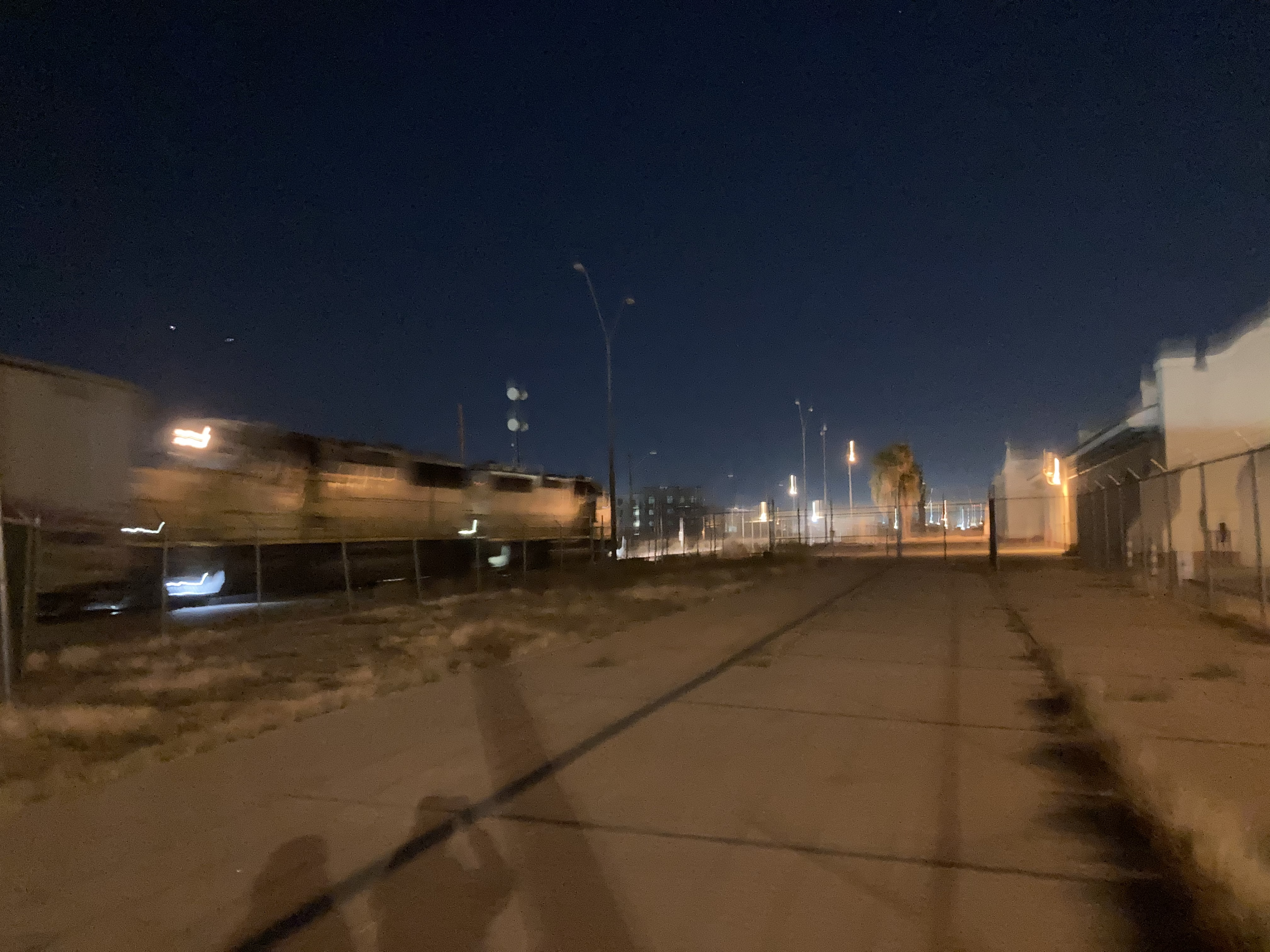
Union Pacific freight train passing through Union Station in October 2021

No regular passenger trains call at Union Station. However, as recently as 2010, there were efforts to bring back passenger rail service to Phoenix. The facility was used until 2020 for a data center for Sprint, which was a Southern Pacific subsidiary. The building was sold in 2020 and the new owners propose it to be a food hall or other event space, as a centerpiece of a larger project.

Amtrak operates the Sunset Limited three times a week from the town of Maricopa, which is in Pinal County thirty miles (48 km) south of downtown Phoenix. A private company, White's Taxi Shuttle, operates a taxi service to the Phoenix metro area; as of April 2017 there is Amtrak Thruway service to and from Maricopa with stops in Tempe and Phoenix (including Sky Harbor airport). The Sunset Limited also directly serves Tucson, and many Phoenix passengers travel to Tucson as an alternative to boarding the train in Maricopa (Greyhound operates frequent daily motorcoach service between Phoenix and Tucson; the Tucson Greyhound depot is about one-half mile (0.8 km) east of the Tucson Amtrak station).

Amtrak's Southwest Chief train route operates through Flagstaff daily, and Amtrak provides guaranteed through-ticketed Amtrak Thruway connecting shuttle service via Airport Shuttle of Phoenix or Arizona Shuttle from Metrocenter Mall (in north central Phoenix) and the town of Camp Verde (in Yavapai County) to and from the trains at Flagstaff.

The nearest Valley Metro Rail station, the Downtown Phoenix Hub, is half a mile away.

As of 2023, passenger rail service between Phoenix and Tucson is in the planning phase. Future extensions of the route could reach to Los Angeles. By 2035, Amtrak has proposed to have rail service connecting 16 stations in Arizona.

In June 2023, Amtrak submitted a grant application requesting $716 million for various long distance proposals. Among them is to bring Sunset Limited service back to Phoenix.
