= Maricopa and Phoenix Railroad =

Overview
- Dates of operation: 1887–1910
- Successor: Arizona Eastern Railway

Technical
- Track gauge: 4 ft 8 1/2 in (1,435 mm) standard gauge

The Maricopa and Phoenix Railroad was a railroad which connected its two namesake towns: Maricopa and Phoenix, Arizona. It was the first railway in Phoenix, providing a connection to the national rail network.

Authorized by an act in 1883, the railway was built with the intent of providing a direct connection from Phoenix to the new Southern Pacific Sunset Route. Planners initially intended to route the line around the west of the South Mountains, though support from Tempe and Mesa compelled a route to the east through those towns. The Maricopa and Phoenix's inaugural trip was on July 4, 1887. The line frequently experienced issues with flooding would sometimes strand passengers at either endpoint for up to a week. The company would go on to be absorbed into the Arizona Eastern Railway in 1910, and then finally becoming part of Southern Pacific itself in 1924. The company would go on to build the Phoenix Subdivision to provide a more reliable route to the city, and the Maricopa Branch would lose significance as a line. Passenger service ended in 1933, and the southern section of the line was abandoned in 1935. A segment of the line exists as the Union Pacific Tempe Industrial Lead.
