= Sunset Limited =

Amtrak service between Los Angeles and New Orleans

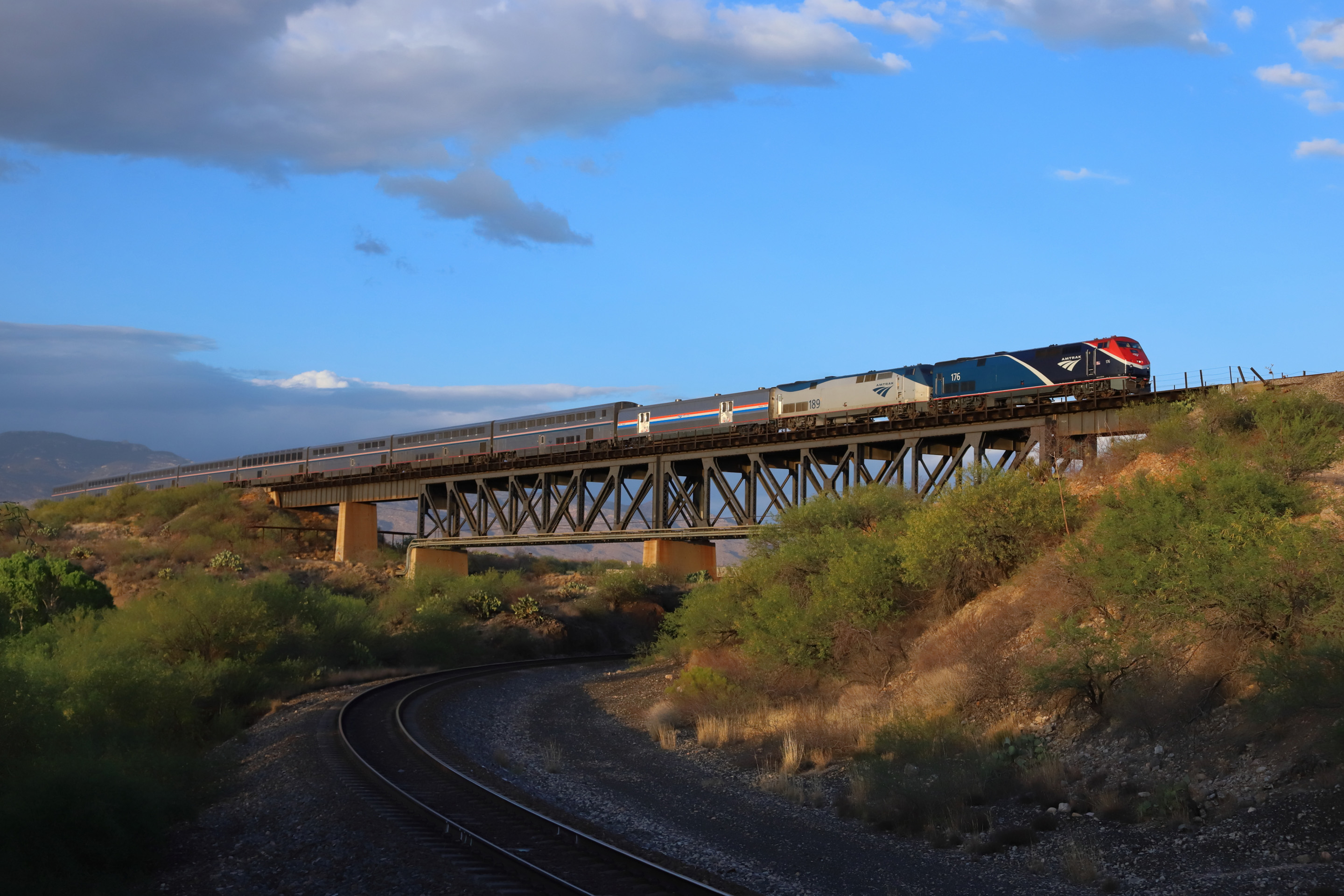
- The Sunset Limited near Vail, Arizona, in 2025

Overview
- Service type: Inter-city rail
- Locale: Southwestern United States
- First service: 1894
- Current operator: Amtrak
- Former operator: Southern Pacific (1894–1971)
- Annual ridership: 91,493 (FY 25) ▲18.9% (Note: Amtrak's Fiscal Year (FY) runs from October 1 of the prior year to September 30 of the named year.)

Route
- Termini: Los Angeles, California; New Orleans, Louisiana
- Stops: 20
- Distance travelled: 1,995 mi (3,211 km)
- Average journey time: 45 hours, 40 minutes (eastbound); 46 hours, 35 minutes (westbound)
- Service frequency: Three round trips per week
- Train numbers: 1 (westbound); 2 (eastbound)

On-board services
- Classes: Coach Class; First Class Sleeper Service
- Disabled access: Train lower level, all stations
- Sleeping arrangements: Roomette (2 beds); Bedroom (2 beds); Bedroom Suite (4 beds); Accessible Bedroom (2 beds); Family Bedroom (4 beds)
- Catering facilities: Dining car, Café
- Observation facilities: Sightseer lounge car
- Baggage facilities: Overhead racks, checked baggage available at selected stations

Technical
- Rolling stock: GE Genesis or Siemens Charger ALC-42 locomotives; Superliner passenger cars
- Track gauge: 4 ft 8 1/2 in (1,435 mm) standard gauge
- Operating speed: 44 mph (71 km/h) (avg.); 79 mph (127 km/h) (top)
- Track owners: UP, BNSF

The Sunset Limited is a long-distance passenger train run by Amtrak, operating on a 1,995-mile (3,211 km) route between New Orleans and Los Angeles. Major stops include Houston, San Antonio and El Paso in Texas, as well as Tucson, Arizona. Opening in 1894 through the Southern Pacific Railroad, the Sunset Limited is the oldest continuously operating named train in the United States.

With three round-trip journeys per week, the Sunset Limited is tied with the Cardinal for the lowest frequency of any regularly scheduled Amtrak route. Each end-to-end journey takes about two days. West of San Antonio, the train runs combined with the Texas Eagle.

From 1993 to 2005, the Sunset Limited operated an extended service to Florida, terminating in Miami from 1993 to 1996 and in Orlando for most of 1996 through 2005, and becoming Amtrak's longest and only coast-to-coast train route. Major stops between New Orleans and Miami included Mobile (Alabama), Tallahassee, Jacksonville, and Orlando (Florida). However, the route east of New Orleans was permanently halted in the aftermath of Hurricane Katrina. There have been attempts to re-extend the service back to Florida but have stalled mainly due to administrative and political obstacles. Amtrak restored service from New Orleans to Mobile in the form of the Mardi Gras Service in August 2025.

== History ==
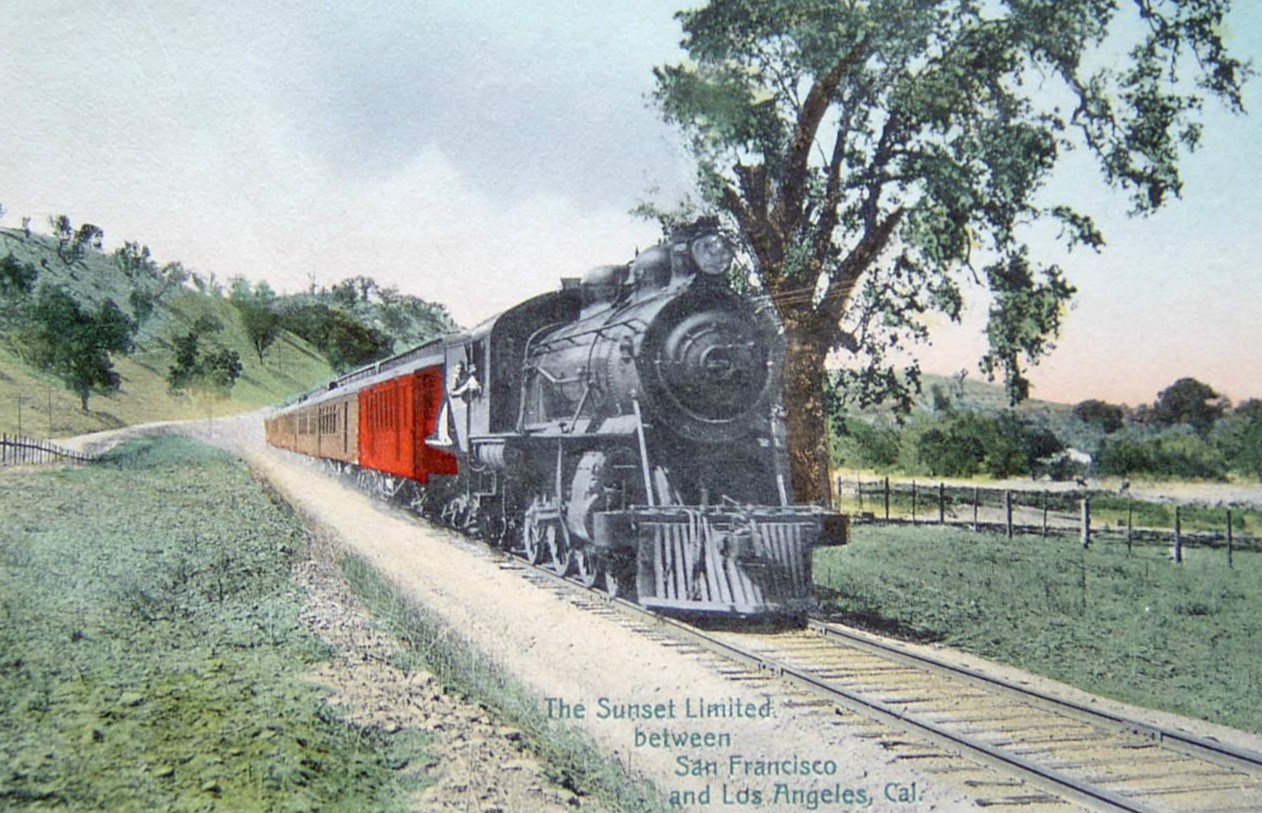
The Sunset Limited c. 1910

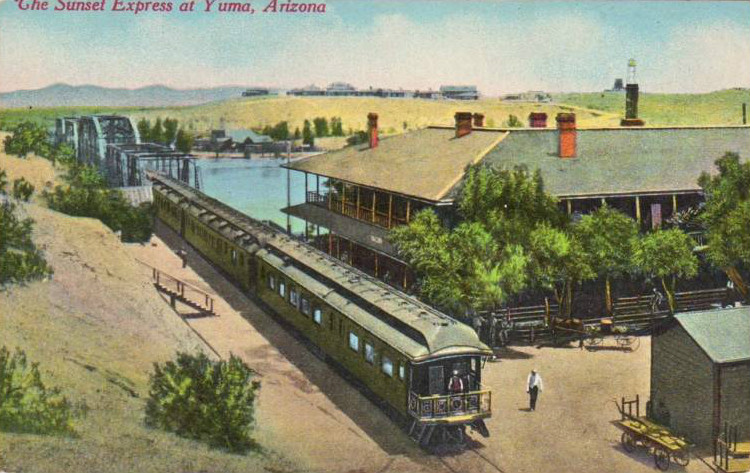
Early depiction of the train at Yuma, Arizona

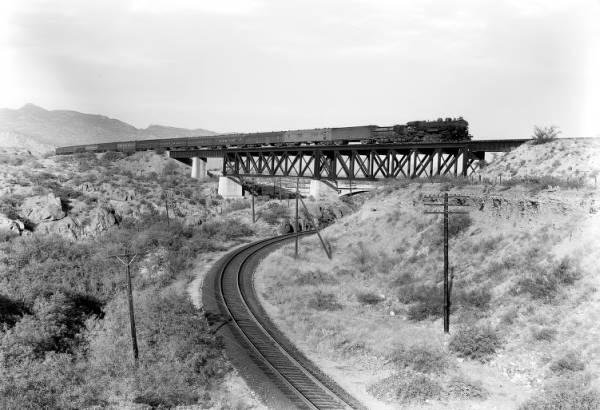
The train crossing Ciénega Creek near Vail, Arizona, in 1921

=== Southern Pacific ===
Before the start of Amtrak on May 1, 1971, the Sunset Limited was operated by the Southern Pacific Railroad. The Sunset Limited is the oldest named train in the United States, operating since November 1894 along the Sunset Route (though originally named the Sunset Express). The Sunset Route (originating in New Orleans) is the southernmost of the three gateways to the West Coast envisioned through the Pacific Railroad Acts. The other two embarked from Chicago and St. Louis. However, the Sunset Route had two major advantages over the other two routes. It was an all-weather, year-round route that did not face the crippling snows of the Wasatch or Sierra mountain ranges to reach the Pacific Coast. Additionally, the other two routes had to assault the front range of the Rockies.

In addition, opened 20 years before the Panama Canal, the Sunset Route vastly shortened the time to reach the West Coast from the Atlantic Ocean and the Caribbean Sea, as New Orleans was already an established seaport for Atlantic shipping lines’ passengers, seeking to reach the US interior. The Sunset Limited allowed passengers to reach the West Coast in a few days, not weeks.

The Sunset Limited was Southern Pacific's premier train. Initially, the Sunset Limited was an all-Pullman train, with sleeping cars and no coaches, running from New Orleans to San Francisco via Los Angeles. From its beginning in 1894, until streamlining in 1950, all the train's cars had 6-wheel trucks and dark olive green paint, with black roofs and trucks. In the summer of 1926, it was scheduled at 71 hr 40 min New Orleans to San Francisco; it then carried a coast-to-coast sleeper from Jacksonville to Los Angeles.

The San Francisco–Los Angeles portion of the Sunset Limited was cut on January 5, 1942. The cut was intended to last only several months to allow for equipment overhaul, but became permanent. On June 2, 1949, the Southern Pacific introduced faster schedules on several named trains. The Sunset Limited was reduced to 49 3/4 hours eastbound and 48 hours westbound.

In contrast to its earliest Amtrak years, the Sunset Limited, up to its later years, made stops not only at Phoenix, but also at Mesa and Chandler, Arizona.

=== Amtrak ===
Amtrak assumed operation of most intercity passenger train routes in the United States on May 1, 1971, including those of the Southern Pacific. Amtrak retained the Sunset Limited and initially left its route unchanged.

On October 2, 1981, Amtrak began operating the Chicago-bound Eagle (known as the Texas Eagle since 1988) in conjunction with the Sunset Limited. The routes operate as one train between Los Angeles and San Antonio, Texas.

==== Extension to Florida ====
The Louisville and Nashville Railroad had operated the Gulf Wind between New Orleans and Jacksonville, Florida, from 1949 to 1971, when Amtrak did not include the route in its initial system. The corridor saw limited service over the next two decades: from 1984 to 1985 the Gulf Coast Limited ran between New Orleans and Mobile, Alabama, and from 1989 to 1995 the Gulf Breeze served the segment between Mobile and Atmore, Alabama.

On April 4, 1993, Amtrak extended the Sunset Limited east to Miami. The train followed the former route of the Gulf Wind between New Orleans and Jacksonville, restoring service on that corridor, and used the route of Amtrak's Silver Meteor south of Jacksonville. On November 10, 1996, the Sunset Limited was cut back to terminate in Sanford, Florida, as part of systemwide cuts. This also allowed the Superliner rolling stock to be maintained along with the Auto Train stock at Sanford. The train was re-extended to Orlando on October 26, 1997.

==== 1990s incidents ====
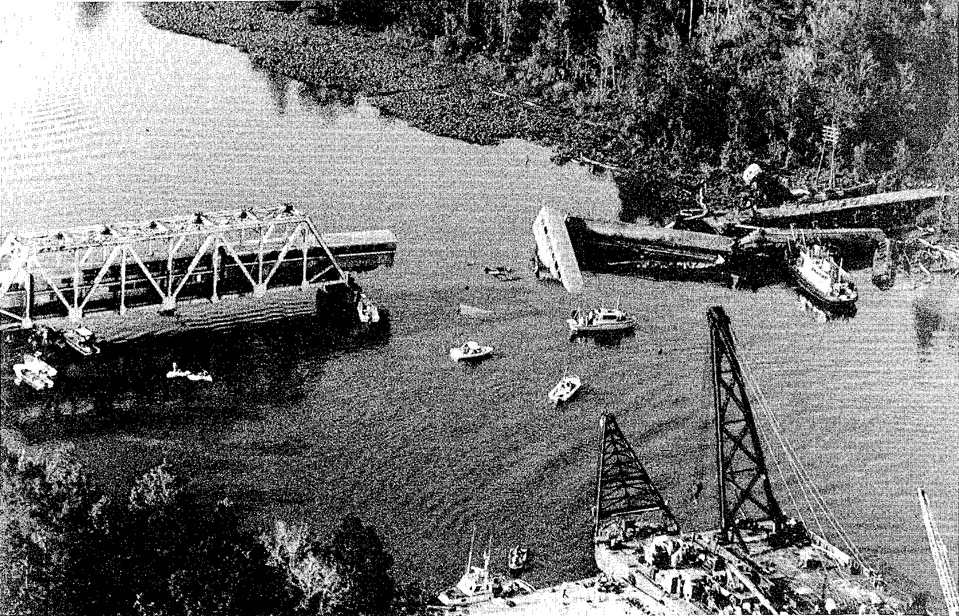
On September 22, 1993, the Sunset Limited fell into water from a swing bridge that had been knocked out of alignment and had its rails deformed by a row of barges colliding with it. 47 people were killed in the accident.

On September 22, 1993, the three locomotives and four of the eight cars of the eastbound Sunset Limited derailed and fell off a damaged bridge into water near Mobile, Alabama. Known as the Big Bayou Canot rail accident, the incident is Amtrak's worst train wreck and resulted in 47 deaths.

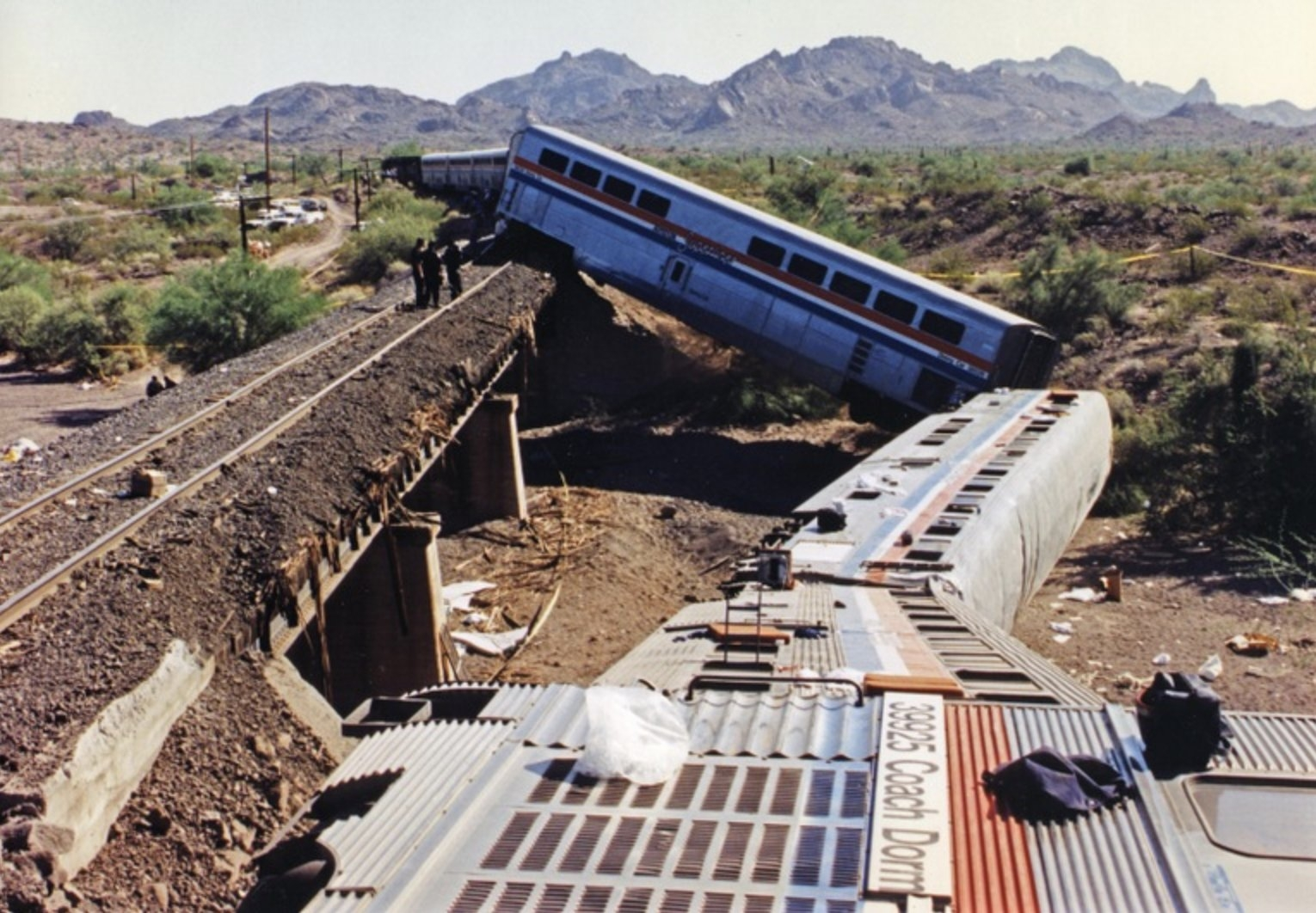
Superliner cars that derailed and fell into the dry bed of Quail Springs Wash, near Harqua, Arizona. On 9 October, 1995, the westbound Sunset Limited derailed, killing one person and injuring several others. The derailment, which was intentionally caused, is believed to have been an act of revenge for the Waco Siege, although the crime remains unsolved

On October 9, 1995, in an event known as the Palo Verde derailment, saboteurs derailed the Sunset Limited near Harqua, Arizona, by removing 29 spikes from a section of track, and short-circuited the signal system to conceal the sabotage. The attack killed one person and injured dozens of others. The crime still remains unsolved.

==== Bypassing of Phoenix ====
On July 2, 1996, the train was rerouted to a more southerly route between Tucson and Yuma, Arizona, bypassing Phoenix. Union Pacific, which had acquired Southern Pacific earlier that year, wanted to abandon a deteriorated section of its Phoenix-Yuma "West Line", particularly the Roll Industrial Lead, that had previously been used to serve Phoenix, due to deteriorating tracks conditions and zero freight traffic. By then the Sunset Limited was only train using the Wellton Branch, and service was slow and bumpy along this worn-out sections. The main freight customer was the United States Department of Energy which used the alignment to transport equipment spent commercial nuclear fuel from the Palo Verde Nuclear Generating Station, but after the 1995 sabotage, this was deemed too insecure, leaving Amtrak the only regular customer.

UP demanded that Amtrak, as the only customer left using the branch, pay for tracks maintenance, and Amtrak, in an attempt to avoid rerouting, requested assistance from the State of Arizona to provide the necessary funds to repair the most critical sections of the Wellton cutoff, but the State refused to provide the funds Amtrak had requested.

Thus by June 1996, the Sunset Limited was bypassing Phoenix, and UP promptly put the 64-mile (103 km) midsection of the Wellton cutoff out of service. This made Phoenix one of the nation's largest cities without direct passenger service; although the designated Phoenix-area stop is in Maricopa, a suburban community about 40 miles (64 km) south of downtown Phoenix. Amtrak Thruway service, run by Stagecoach Express, connects the two cities.

==== Hurricane Katrina ====
On August 29, 2005, the Sunset Limited route was truncated east of San Antonio, Texas, as a result of damage to trackage in the Gulf Coast area caused by Hurricane Katrina. In late October 2005, service was restored between San Antonio and New Orleans, as the line through Louisiana had been repaired. Service east of New Orleans was suspended permanently despite CSX Transportation completing repairs on the trackage in January 2006.

==== Recent years ====
The Sunset Limited received a modified schedule on May 7, 2012, moving its westbound movements from New Orleans to a Monday, Wednesday, and Saturday circuit. The times allow several 7- to 12-hour rides between major-city pairs; for example, overnight between Tucson or Maricopa (for Phoenix) and Los Angeles in both directions.

While most Amtrak trains saw service reductions in 2020–2022 due to the COVID-19 pandemic, the Sunset Limited and its existing sub-daily schedule were not affected. The Texas Eagle was reduced to tri-weekly from October 2020 and May 2021, temporarily matching the Sunset Limited.

On December 8, 2022, Amtrak filed a complaint with the Surface Transportation Board (STB) against the Union Pacific Railroad alleging that the poor on-time performance of the Sunset Limited was due to issues that Union Pacific could avoid. On July 11, 2023, the STB announced that it was opening an investigation into the matter. Amtrak and Union Pacific settled the case in July 2025.

In December 2025, Roger Harris, Amtrak's vicepresident, announced that the necessary studies had been resubmitted to the FRA for evaluation of converting the Sunset Limited into a daily train.

== Proposed expansion ==
=== Re-extension to Florida ===
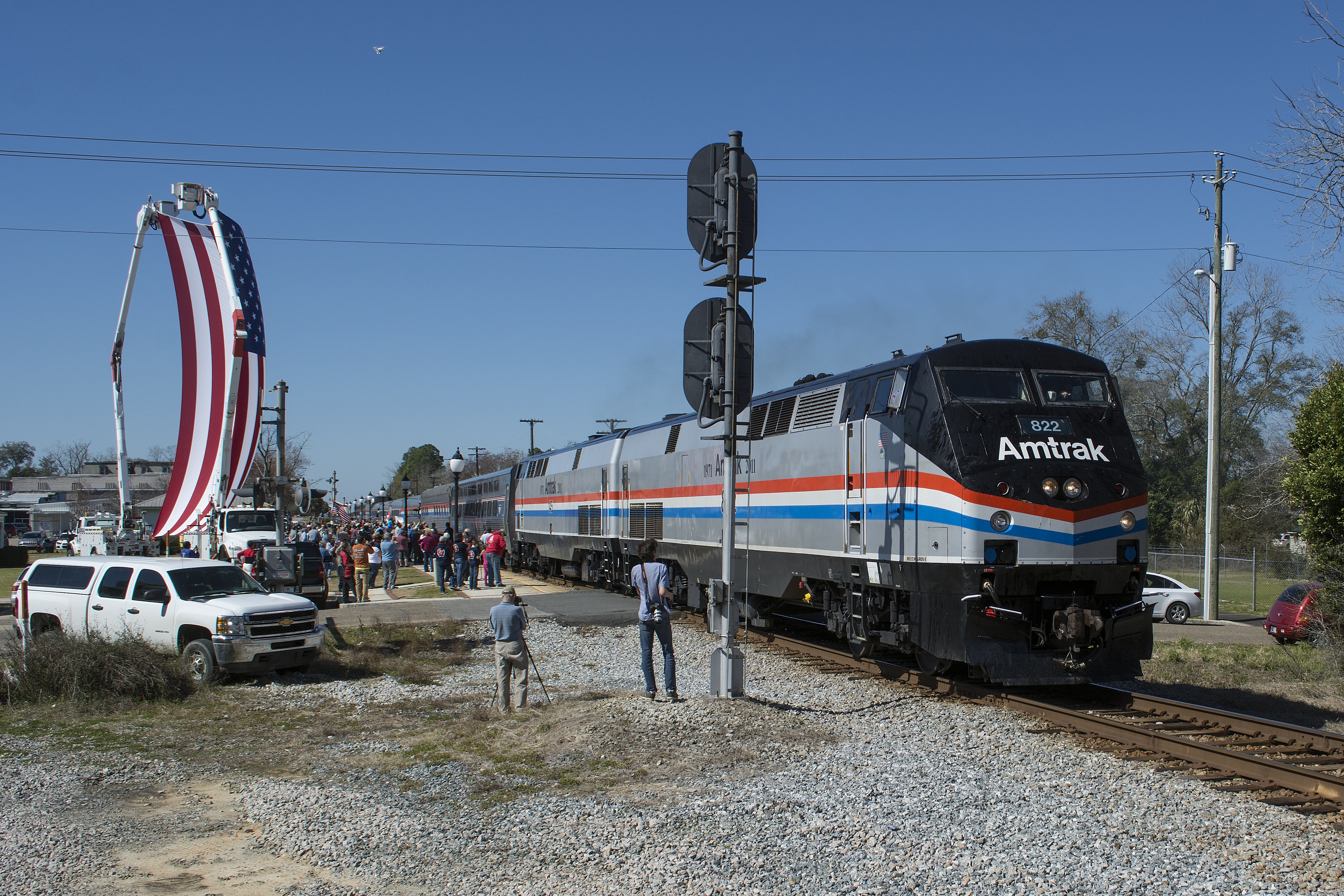
Amtrak's Return to Service Special arrives in Chipley, Florida, on February 19, 2016.

As time has passed, particularly since the January 2006 completion of the rebuilding of damaged tracks east of New Orleans by their owner CSX Transportation, the obstacles to restoration of the Sunset Limited's full route have been more managerial and political than physical. Advocates for the train's restoration have pointed to revenue figures for Amtrak's fiscal year 2004, the last full year of coast-to-coast Sunset Limited service. During that period, the Orlando–New Orleans segment accounted for 41% of the Sunset's revenue.

Section 226 of the Rail Safety Improvement Act of 2008, signed into law by President George W. Bush on October 16, 2008, gave Amtrak nine months to provide Congress with a plan for restoring service that "shall include a projected timeline for restoring such service, the costs associated with restoring such service, and any proposals for legislation necessary to support such restoration of service."

In January 2016, Amtrak and the Southern Rail Commission announced jointly that a Gulf Coast passenger rail inspection trip was to be made from New Orleans to Jacksonville, with elected officials among those on board during the February 18–19 excursion. Stops were planned for all of the stations formerly part of the Sunset Limited's route between those two cities. In June 2018, the commission missed the deadline for submitting a request for service restoration along the Gulf. It said that it could not apply for the Federal Railroad Administration's (FRA) fiscal-year 2017 Consolidated Rail Infrastructure Safety and Improvements (CRISI) funding because Alabama and Mississippi were unwilling to assist with funds. Alabama's share would have been $5.3 million. The Louisiana governor, on the other hand, was willing to provide the funds. The three states' cooperation was needed to secure the $35.5 million in federal CRISI funds.

==== New Gulf Coast service ====
On February 23, 2021, following the conclusion of one year of negotiations with CSX and Norfolk Southern, Amtrak officials announced that a new Gulf Coast corridor service between New Orleans and Mobile would start as early as January 2022. Amtrak plans to pay for repairs along the route. In late 2022, with lengthy negotiations with Amtrak, Norfolk Southern, and CSX expected, the Gulf Coast service was projected to begin sometime in 2023. However, in early August 2023, it was reported that an agreement between Amtrak, CSX, and the city of Mobile on the design and construction of the station there had not yet been reached, and that the service was now not expected to start until the first quarter of 2024. In late August, the working name of the train was reported to be Mardi Gras Service. By January 2025, Amtrak planned to have service operational in June 2025. On July 1, 2025, Amtrak announced that the Mardi Gras Service would begin service on August 18, 2025, with two daily round-trips.

==== Restoration of the Florida Panhandle Service ====
In terms of the rest of the route for the restoration of Florida Panhandle service, Amtrak stated that their "focus has been on restoring service from New Orleans to Mobile, Alabama," and they would be "willing to explore such service [on the Florida Panhandle] with the state’s financial support." Meanwhile, the Florida Department of Transportation stated that they would support service restoration "as long as the restored service is a National Network long-distance train that will not require a future annual operating subsidy from state sponsors." The mayors and city councils of Pensacola, Tallahassee, and Lake City have shown much interest in resuming the service. The corridor would eventually need to be upgraded for speeds greater than 45 miles per hour (72 km/h), and some of the stations require refurbishment or replacement.

=== Daily service ===
In 2009, Brian Rosenwald, a now-departed Amtrak executive, outlined ideas for a complete overhaul of the route, including daily service. It was to have the Texas Eagle operate over the Sunset Limited's route west of San Antonio, with a stub train connecting San Antonio (with a cross-platform transfer) and New Orleans. The plans were halted when Union Pacific stated that to get a daily Sunset Limited, Amtrak would need to pay $750 million for infrastructure improvements.

Passenger totals would double with daily service, according to the PRIIA study that looked at Texas Eagle/Sunset Limited service. It forecast an incremental improvement of more than 100,000 passengers from the daily service, which is already running in excess of 100,000 a year. In the meantime, the Union Pacific has double-tracked much of the route with its own money. However, Amtrak still lacks the equipment and funds needed to move to daily service.

In June 2021, Senator Jon Tester of Montana added an amendment to the Surface Transportation Investment Act of 2021 which would require the U.S. Department of Transportation (not Amtrak itself) to evaluate daily service on all less-frequent long-distance trains, meaning the Sunset Limited and Cardinal. The bill passed the Senate Commerce Committee with bipartisan support, and was later rolled into President Biden's Infrastructure Investment and Jobs Act (IIJA), which Congress passed on November 5, 2021. The report is known as the Amtrak Daily Long-Distance Service Study and must be delivered to Congress within two years.

In June 2023, Amtrak submitted an application for a federal grant to increase Sunset Limited service to operate daily.

In December 2025, during a public meeting of Amtrak's board of directors, Roger Harris, company's vicepresident, announced that the necessary studies had been resubmitted to the FRA for evaluation of converting the Sunset Limited into a daily train.

=== Return to Phoenix ===
Phoenix Subdivision (UP), black: Inactive Portion blue: Gila Subdivision orange: Phoenix Subdivision (BNSF)

Since its Wellton branch closure, officials have intermittently considered different options for how to reopen the line and restore Sunset Limited direct passenger service to Phoenix and potentially launching intercity service to LA. The most recent study was conducted by ADOT in an effort to understand the existing condition of the Wellton Branch and to develop improvement scenarios and capital cost estimates for freight and passenger rail service between Arlington and Wellton, a distance of 90.8 miles. In that study, it was determined that freight demand along the Wellton Branch line/Phoenix Subdivision does not warrant re-opening the Wellton Branch and that re-opening this corridor solely for passenger service is not cost effective.

Results of ADOT's Wellton Branch Railroad Rehabilitation Study
	Track grade	Freight max speed	Passenger max speed	Total Est. Cost (millions)	Avg. Cost/Route mile (millions)
1	Class 2 Track	25 mph (40 km/h)	N/A	$165.4	$1.8
2	Class 3 Track	40 mph (64 km/h)	60 mph (97 km/h)	$194.8	$2.1
2A	Class 3 w/PTC	40 mph (64 km/h)	60 mph (97 km/h)	$266.0	$2.9
3	Class 4 Track	60 mph (97 km/h)	79 mph (127 km/h)	$420.3	$4.6

However, in February 2023, the FRA indicated that it was studying a re-route of the Sunset Limited from Maricopa back to Phoenix as part of the Amtrak Daily Long-Distance Service Study ordered by the IIJA. The move would revert a 1996 route change that cut direct service to Arizona's most populous metropolitan area, with stops at Phoenix, Tempe, and Coolidge.

In June 2023, Amtrak submitted an application to the FRA seeking funding for a project to return Sunset Limited service to Phoenix, paired with increasing the route's frequency to once-daily service.

In December 2023, as a part of the Corridor Identification and Development Program, the Federal Government awarded a $500,000 grant to the State of Arizona to study Phoenix–Tucson passenger rail. The new rail line plan would send trains from Tucson to the far East Valley, through downtown and on to the West Valley, before reconnecting to UP's mainline in Wellton, near Yuma. Part of this route would include trackage needed for the Sunset Limited's return to Phoenix service.

== Operation ==
As of 2024, a typical Sunset Limited train has one or two GE P42DC locomotives, a Viewliner II baggage car, a Superliner sleeper, a Superliner diner, a Superliner Sightseer Lounge, a Superliner coach, and a Superliner coach/baggage car. West of San Antonio, the train has an additional sleeper and coach that operate as Los Angeles–Chicago through cars via the Texas Eagle. Amtrak plans to eventually re-add a Superliner transition sleeper to the train.

As with other long-distance routes, Amtrak plans to replace the P42DCs with Siemens ALC-42 locomotives by 2027, and the Superliner cars with new long-distance cars by 2032.

=== Route ===
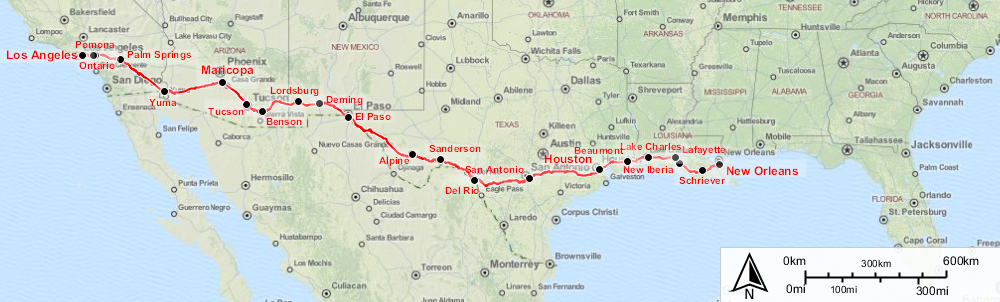
Sunset Limited route map

For most of its existence, the Sunset Limited route was owned by the Southern Pacific Railroad. The name Sunset Limited traces its origins to the Galveston, Harrisburg and San Antonio Railway, a Southern Pacific subsidiary which was known as the Sunset Route as early as 1874.

Most of the current route from New Orleans westward is now owned by the Union Pacific Railroad, which acquired Southern Pacific in 1996. However, the route within Louisiana and some of Texas was partially sold to BNSF Railway in 1995 in return for BNSF not objecting to the UP-SP merger.

On the portion of the route east of New Orleans, service was suspended after Hurricane Katrina. Those tracks, between New Orleans and Florida, include parts of the Atlantic Coast Line Railroad, the Seaboard Air Line Railroad, and the Louisville and Nashville Railroad—all now merged into CSX Transportation. Currently, the segment of the former Atlantic Coast Line Railroad between DeLand and Orlando is owned by Orlando's commuter service SunRail, and the segment of track from Pensacola to Baldwin is now owned by the Florida Gulf & Atlantic Railroad.

The train uses the following route segments, identified here by the names of their original owners:

Route	Original owner	Current owner
New Orleans–Lafayette, Louisiana	Morgan's Louisiana and Texas Railroad and Steamship Company (SP)	BNSF/UP
Lafayette–Lake Charles, Louisiana	Louisiana Western Railroad (SP)	BNSF/UP
Lake Charles–Orange, Texas	Louisiana Western Railroad (SP)	UP
Orange–Houston, Texas	Texas and New Orleans Railroad (SP)	UP
Beaumont-Houston, Texas	Beaumont, Sour Lake and Western Railway (MP)	UP
Houston–El Paso, Texas	Galveston, Harrisburg and San Antonio Railway (SP)	UP
El Paso–Los Angeles, California	Southern Pacific Railroad	UP

== Stations ==
State/Province	City	Station	Connections
Louisiana	New Orleans	New Orleans	Amtrak: City of New Orleans, Crescent, Mardi Gras Service; 46 Rampart–Loyola Streetcar Line; New Orleans Regional Transit Authority
Louisiana	Schriever	Schriever	
Louisiana	New Iberia	New Iberia	
Louisiana	Lafayette	Lafayette	
Louisiana	Lake Charles	Lake Charles	Lake Charles Transit
Texas	Beaumont	Beaumont	Beaumont Municipal Transit System
Texas	Houston	Houston	Amtrak Thruway; Greyhound Lines; METRO Bus
Texas	San Antonio	San Antonio	Amtrak: Texas Eagle; Amtrak Thruway
Texas	Del Rio	Del Rio	
Texas	Sanderson	Sanderson	
Texas	Alpine	Alpine	
Texas	El Paso	El Paso	El Paso Streetcar; Sun Metro
New Mexico	Deming	Deming	
New Mexico	Lordsburg	Lordsburg	
Arizona	Benson	Benson	Greyhound Lines
Arizona	Tucson	Tucson	Sun Link; Sun Tran
Arizona	Maricopa	Maricopa	Amtrak Thruway
Arizona	Yuma	Yuma	
California	Palm Springs	Palm Springs	
California	Ontario	Ontario	Amtrak Thruway: 19; Omnitrans
California	Pomona	Pomona	Metrolink: Riverside; Foothill Transit; Omnitrans
California	Los Angeles	Los Angeles Union	Amtrak: Coast Starlight, Pacific Surfliner, Southwest Chief; Metrolink: 91/Perris Valley Antelope Valley Orange County Riverside San Bernardino Ventura County; Metro: A Line, B Line, D Line, J Line; Amtrak Thruway: 1; FlixBus; Greyhound Lines; Los Angeles Metro Bus, Antelope Valley Transit Authority, City of Commerce Transit, City of Santa Clarita Transit, LAX FlyAway, LADOT Commuter Express, LADOT DASH, Mount St. Mary's College Shuttle, University of Southern California Shuttles, Foothill Transit, Big Blue Bus, Torrance Transit, Dodger Stadium Express

== Ridership ==
Along with the Cardinal, the Sunset Limited is one of Amtrak's two long-distance services which operate thrice weekly. Consequently, it carried the third-fewest passengers of any Amtrak train in fiscal year 2019 (92,827, a 4.4% decrease over FY2018). It had a total revenue of $10,769,179 in 2016, marking a 7.5% decrease over FY2015.

Traffic by Fiscal Year (October–September)
	Ridership	Change over previous year	Ticket Revenue	Change over previous year
2007	63,336	-	$6,955,881	-
2008	71,719	▲13.2%	$8,052,515	▲15.8%
2009	78,775	▲9.8%	$8,272,084	▲2.7%
2010	91,684	▲16.4%	$9,962,415	▲20.4%
2011	99,714	▲8.8%	$11,138,286	▲11.8%
2012	101,217	▲1.5%	$11,584,844	▲4.0%
2013	102,924	▲1.7%	$12,275,400	▲6.0%
2014	105,041	▲2.1%	$12,597,724	▲2.6%
2015	100,713	▼4.1%	$11,639,368	▼7.6%
2016	98,079	▼2.6%	$10,769,179	▼7.5%
2017	99,000	▲0.9%	-	-
2018	97,078	▼1.9%	-	-
2019	92,827	▼4.4%	-	-
2020	55,118	▼38.9%	-	-
2021	57,562	▲4.4%	-	-
2022	73,904	▲28.4%	-	-
2023	77,288	▲4.6%	-	-
2024	76,937	▼-0.5%	$10,800,000	-
2025	91,500	▲18.9%	$13,400,000	▲24.1%
