= Phoenix–Tucson passenger rail =

Proposed train service in Arizona

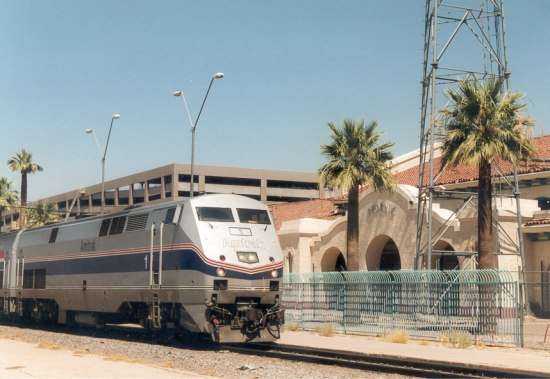
- Charter train at Phoenix Union Station in 2001

Overview
- Service type: Inter-city rail
- Status: Proposed
- Locale: Arizona
- Current operator: Amtrak

Route
- Termini: Phoenix; Tucson
- Distance travelled: 115 miles
- Average journey time: 2 hours 25 minutes
- Service frequency: 3 daily round trips

Technical
- Track gauge: 4 ft 8 1/2 in (1,435 mm) standard gauge

The Phoenix–Tucson passenger rail is a planned inter-city passenger train service to be operated by Amtrak in the Arizona Sun Corridor between Phoenix and Tucson, the two most populous cities in Arizona. As proposed, the train would run from Buckeye to Tucson with major stops in Downtown Phoenix, Phoenix Sky Harbor Airport, and Tempe.

As of December 2023, the project has received at least $4 million in state and federal funds for the planning phase.

== History ==
=== Background ===
The last train to run between Phoenix and Tucson was the long-distance Sunset Limited. In June 1996, the train was rerouted 30 mi (48 km) south of Phoenix to Maricopa, leaving the Arizona state capital as the largest city in the United States to lack direct inter-city rail service. Tucson remains served by the Sunset Limited just three times per week.

=== Proposal ===
In 2011, the Arizona Department of Transportation (ADOT) and Federal Railroad Administration (FRA) began a Passenger Rail Corridor Study for the Phoenix–Tucson route. They published the Tier 1 Draft Environmental Impact Statement in September 2015 and the final Record or Decision in December 2016.

In spring 2021, Amtrak included the Buckeye–Phoenix–Tucson route in its 15-year "Amtrak Connects US" expansion vision. In July 2021, Amtrak President Stephen Gardner and CEO Bill Flynn formally announced plans for the service. The proposal calls for three round trips per day with a one-way trip time of 2 hours 25 minutes. Intermediate stops are listed as Goodyear-Avondale, Downtown Phoenix, Phoenix Sky Harbor Airport, Tempe, Queen Creek, Coolidge, and Marana. The option is given for future expansion west to Los Angeles.

In June 2023, Amtrak and ADOT submitted the Phoenix–Tucson project to the FRA's Corridor Identification and Development Program. The program provides money for planning studies and prioritizes routes for future federal funding. The corridor was accepted into the program in December 2023 and ADOT was granted $500,000. ADOT had already acquired $3.5 million in state funds to go toward the planning phase.

On February 12, 2024, Republican state legislators drafted a bill, SB 1184, which sought to block the progress of the train service between Phoenix and Tucson, presenting the bill to the Arizona Senate. The bill threatened to remove all funding from ADOT if it accepted any public money for the construction of the train line. The bill passed the Arizona Senate with a vote of 17-11. It was sent to the Arizona House of Representatives, where it was assigned to the Transportation & Infrastructure Committee for a vote. However, the bill failed to pass, with a vote of 5-5, on March 22, 2024.

== Route ==
As proposed, the service would use existing freight rail lines owned by the Union Pacific Railroad:

- Phoenix Subdivision from Buckeye through Phoenix to a junction east of Eloy
- Gila Subdivision from the junction to Tucson
