= Phoenix Subdivision (Union Pacific Railroad) =

Railroad line in Arizona, US

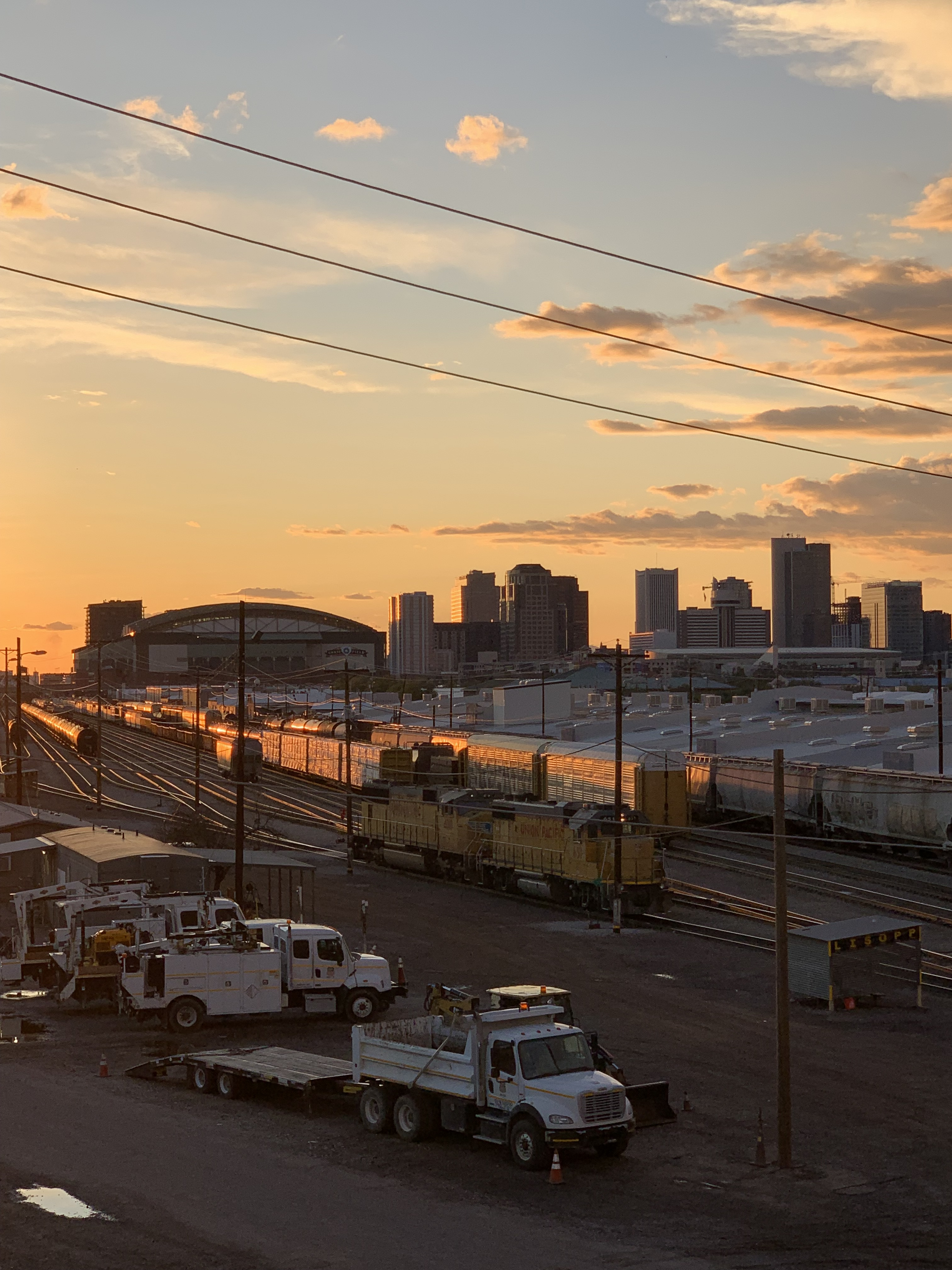
- UP Phoenix Yard at Sunset in March 2024 with Chase Field in the background

Overview
- Owner: Union Pacific Railroad
- Locale: Arizona
- Termini: Eloy, AZ; Wellton, AZ
- Connecting lines: Copper Basin Railway; Magma Arizona Railroad; Phoenix Subdivision (BNSF)
- Website: https://www.up.com/

Service
- Type: Inter-city rail Freight rail
- Operator: Union Pacific Railroad

History
- Completed: 1928

Technical
- Number of tracks: 1
- Track gauge: 4 ft 8 1/2 in (1,435 mm) standard gauge
Route map
🔴 Phoenix Subdivision (UP) ⚫ Inactive Portion 🔵 Gila Subdivision 🟠 Phoenix Subdivision (BNSF)

The Phoenix Subdivision is a railroad line in the U.S. state of Arizona owned by the Union Pacific Railroad. The southeast end of the line connects to the Gila Subdivision near Eloy, runs northeast to Phoenix, and becomes the Roll Industrial Lead, running southwest before reconnecting to the Gila Subdivision at Wellton. As of 2010, eighty miles (130 km) of the line between Roll and Arlington are out of service and used for car storage.

The railway is used by almost exclusively for freight movements, with about four trains per day as of May 2018. The McElhaney Cattle Company maintains trackage rights over the western six miles (9.7 km) of the line, with traffic consisting of grain cars.

On October 9, 1995, saboteurs intentionally derailed the Sunset Limited near the town of Palo Verde. The perpetrators have never been caught.

Amtrak ran the Sunset Limited on the route until June 1996 when Union Pacific wanted to reduce upkeep costs on the west end of the line; passenger service was rerouted to Maricopa. The line is part of a system of proposed commuter rail lines in the Phoenix metropolitan area and could be reopened to support that.

== History ==
The rail line between Wellton and Phoenix was built by the Southern Pacific Railroad, with passenger service commencing in 1928. The line was rerouted to the east in 1964; part of the old routing remains as the Chandler Industrial Lead. The line was downgraded to a branch line in 1997, as most traffic was rerouted via Maricopa.

=== Sunset Limited bypassing of Phoenix ===
On June 2, 1996, the Sunset Limited was rerouted to a more southerly route between Tucson, and Yuma, Arizona, bypassing Phoenix. Union Pacific, which had acquired Southern Pacific earlier in the year, wanted to abandon a decaying portion of its Phoenix–Yuma "West Line", particularly the Roll Industrial Lead, that had previously been used to serve Phoenix, due to deteriorating tracks conditions and zero freight traffic. By then the Sunset Limited was only train using the Wellton Branch, and service was slow and bumpy along this worn-out section. The main freight customer was the United States Department of Energy which used the alignment to transport equipment spent commercial nuclear fuel from the Palo Verde Nuclear Generating Station, but after the 1995 sabotage, this was deemed too insecure, leaving Amtrak the only regular customer.

UP demanded that Amtrak, as the only customer left using the branch, pay for tracks maintenance, and Amtrak, in an attempt to avoid rerouting, requested assistance from the State of Arizona to provide the necessary funds to repair the most critical sections of the Wellton cutoff, but the State refused to provide the funds Amtrak had requested.

Thus by June 1996, the Sunset Limited was bypassing Phoenix, and UP promptly put the 64-mile (103 km) midsection of the Wellton cutoff out of service. This made Phoenix one of the nation's largest cities without direct passenger service; although the designated Phoenix-area stop is in Maricopa, a suburban community about 40 miles (64 km) south of downtown Phoenix. Amtrak Thruway service, run by Stagecoach Express, connects the two cities.

=== Proposals to reopen the Wellton Branch ===
Since its closure, officials have intermittently considered different options for how to reopen the line and restore Sunset Limited direct passenger service to Phoenix and potentially launch LA intercity service. The most recent study was conducted in 2014 by ADOT in an effort to understand the existing condition of the Wellton Branch and to develop improvement scenarios and capital cost estimates for freight and passenger rail service between Arlington and Wellton, a distance of 90.8 miles (146.1 km). In that study, it was determined that current freight demand along the line does not warrant reopening the Wellton Branch and that reactivating this corridor solely for passenger service is not cost effective.

Results of ADOT's Wellton Branch Railroad Rehabilitation Study
	Track grade	Freight max speed	Passenger max speed	Total Est. Cost (millions)	Avg. Cost/Route mile (millions)
1	Class 2 Track	25 mph	NA	$165.4	$1.8
2	Class 3 Track	40 mph	60 mph	$194.8	$2.1
2A	Class 3 w/PTC	40 mph	60 mph	$266.0	$2.9
3	Class 4 Track	60 mph	79 mph	$420.3	$4.6

== Phoenix Intermodal Terminal ==
Phoenix Intermodal Terminal was announced in November 2023, and operation began on February 1, 2024. The facility is located in UP's Phoenix Yard and will serve shipments coming from the Port of Los Angeles. Drayage service will be provide by Duncan & Sons, a local logistics firm.

== Sources ==
- Pry, Mark; Andersen, Fred (December 2011). "Arizona Transportation History" (PDF). ADOT. Archived from the original (PDF) on June 6, 2017.
