= Sunset Route =

Railway in the Southwestern United States

- Union Pacific GE AC4400CW No. 7277 leads between a wind farm and desert land outside the town of Cabazon in Riverside County, California (2013)

Overview
- Owner: Union Pacific Railroad
- Locale: Southwestern and Southeastern United States
- Termini: Los Angeles, California; New Orleans, Louisiana
- Connecting lines: Yuma Subdivision; Gila Subdivision; Lordsburg Subdivision; Valentine Subdivision; Sanderson Subdivision; Del Rio Subdivision; Glidden Subdivision; Houston Subdivision; Lafayette Subdivision; Terminal Subdivision

Service
- Type: Freight rail; Inter-city rail
- Operators: Union Pacific Railroad; Amtrak; BNSF Railway

History
- Opened: 5 February 1883

Technical
- Line length: 760 mi (1,220 km)
- Number of tracks: 1–2
- Track gauge: 1,435 mm (4 ft 8 1/2 in) standard gauge
- Train protection system: PTC

The Sunset Route is a main line of the Union Pacific Railroad running between Southern California and New Orleans, Louisiana. It is the southernmost railway that connects the central United States to the U.S. Pacific Coast.

== History ==
The idea for this railroad dated before the American Civil War, as businessmen in the Southern United States wanted a direct connection to the Pacific Ocean. This was the rationale for the Gadsden Purchase.

The name traces its origins to the Galveston, Harrisburg and San Antonio Railway, a Southern Pacific Railroad subsidiary which was known as the Sunset Route as early as 1874. The line was built by several different companies and largely consolidated under Southern Pacific, with completion at the Colorado River in 1883. Its construction prompted a frog war at the Colton Crossing, where it intersects the Southern Transcon, then owned by the Atchison, Topeka and Santa Fe Railway, and now by BNSF Railway.

The first trains departed for through service between Los Angeles, California and New Orleans on February 5, 1883.

The Sunset Route previously extended northward from Los Angeles to San Francisco, California.

== Description ==
The Sunset Route's western terminus officially begins about 71 miles (115 km) east of Los Angeles, in West Colton, California. Going eastward, the route immediately faces steep inclines of up to 1.9% as it reaches 2,560 feet (780 m) in elevation at Beaumont Hill, near Palm Springs, California. It then turns southeast, quickly dropping to 201 feet (61 m) below sea level at Wister, California on the landlocked Salton Sea. The route rises to 385 feet (117 m) in elevation before dropping again as it goes through Yuma, Arizona, near the California and Mexico borders and close to where the Gila River discharges into the Colorado River. It turns directly east to Maricopa, Arizona, at the southern edge of the Phoenix metropolitan area, before turning to the southeast again to Tucson, Arizona. Heading eastward again, the route rises to 4,557 feet (1,389 m) at Dragoon in southeast Arizona, drops to 3,600 feet (1,100 m) in San Simon, Arizona, and then crosses the Continental Divide at 4,554 feet (1,388 m) elevation at Wilna in southwest New Mexico before crossing into Texas at the Mexican border metropolis of El Paso. The Sunset Route is the lowest railway that crosses the Continental Divide.

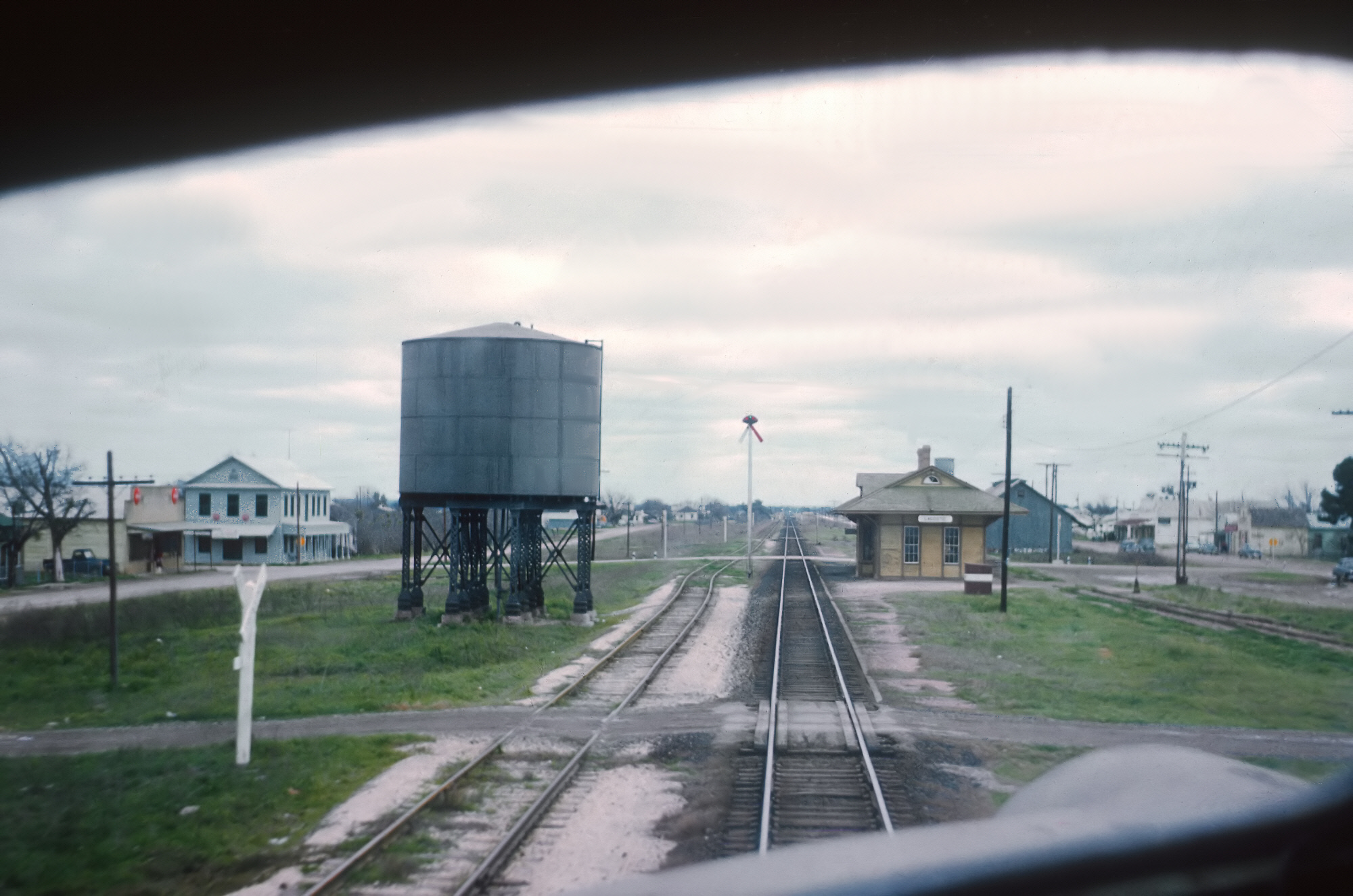
Coming into LaCoste, Texas in 1960.

At El Paso, the Sunset Route splits off into the Golden State Route, which is another main line that Union Pacific acquired in the Southern Pacific merger that heads northeast to Kansas City, Missouri and Chicago, Illinois. The Sunset Route itself turns southeast past El Paso near the Rio Grande River within the Trans-Pecos region of West Texas. At the town of Sierra Blanca, Texas, 90 miles (140 km) from El Paso, the Sunset Route meets the western end of the former Texas and Pacific main line, acquired by Union Pacific when it merged with Missouri Pacific, that goes east-northeast through the Dallas-Fort Worth metroplex. The Sunset Route continues heading roughly southeast within the Rio Grande watershed until it arrives at the Mexican border city of Del Rio, Texas; at that point, the route turns directly east through San Antonio, Texas, the Gulf Coast metropolis of Houston, Texas, and the eastern terminus of New Orleans, in southeast Louisiana on the Mississippi River Delta. Between San Antonio and New Orleans, the Sunset Route meets several other Union Pacific-controlled main lines and branch lines, of which many are directional running operations.

BNSF shares ownership of the Lafayette Subdivision.

== Usage ==
The line is primarily used for freight, especially of intermodal freight transport, due to its close proximity and rail connections to the Port of Los Angeles and Port of Long Beach. In the 1980s, Southern Pacific pioneered the carrying of intermodal containers on double-stack trains on the Sunset Route. The route also moves finished automobiles, grain, and other non-intermodal freight.

In 1998, the Los Angeles to El Paso section of the Sunset Route was hosting about 33 trains per day. By 2007, 45 trains daily were operating through Maricopa, Arizona, 55 daily trains were running in 2015, and 90 were projected after the full completion of the second track on the Los Angeles to El Paso section. However, by 2019 the number of daily trains between Los Angeles and El Paso had dropped to 39, and the section east of El Paso in the Trans-Pecos region was hosting 12 trains per day. In June 2024, the daily traffic in Wellton, Arizona was 28 trains (14 in each direction), of which a majority were intermodal freight trains, about a quarter were mixed freight trains, and 6% carried automobiles. The reduced number of trains were somewhat offset by increasingly large train lengths; several of the longest trains observed were at least 18,000 feet (5,500 m) in length.

The Amtrak Sunset Limited operates three round-trips weekly over the entirety of the route, and the Texas Eagle from Chicago is attached between San Antonio and Los Angeles. In December 2023, the Federal Railroad Administration (FRA) announced a grant through its Corridor ID Program to increase the frequency of the Sunset Limited to full daily round-trip service. The program also issued grants to develop state-supported passenger routes between San Antonio and Houston, in the Phoenix–Tucson Corridor (using Sunset Route track between Picacho, Arizona and Tucson), and in the Coachella Valley Rail (CV Rail) corridor (using Sunset Route track between Colton, California and Coachella, California).

== Western double-track project ==
When Southern Pacific Railroad merged with Union Pacific in 1996, the operating plan that was filed along with the merger application stipulated that one of the first major investments would be to double-track the Sunset Route between Los Angeles and El Paso. At the time of the merger, only about 152 miles (245 km), or approximately 20% of the route, were double-tracked. However, the combined company's efforts to expand double-trackage between Los Angeles and El Paso were soon delayed in favor of more profitable investments on Union Pacific's pre-existing lines north of the Sunset Route to improve coal-hauling capacity or to better handle mixed-freight trains along the Central Corridor. Building on Southern Pacific's successful efforts in the 1980s to revive the Golden State Route from near disuse, the merged company invested hundreds of million US dollars more to make extra improvements to the Golden State Route, and it spent similar amounts to rehabilitate the Texas and Pacific line from similar inactivity. Because of these updates, daily traffic increased on the Texas and Pacific line from 2 trains in 1996 to 19 trains in 2004. Both lines funneled additional trains onto the Sunset Route's Los Angeles–El Paso section, which exacerbated the traffic meltdown that occurred there in 2003–2004 after Union Pacific underestimated the strong economic recovery from the early 2000s recession.

Work to add the second track picked up in the mid-2000s, and by late 2007, Union Pacific was targeting the complete double-tracking of the 757-mile (1,218 km) Los Angeles–El Paso section by the end of 2010. By 2012, 72% of that section, or 547 miles (880 km), would have two tracks, including the entire section between Tucson and El Paso. Union Pacific no longer provided a specific timeline for full completion of the second track, though. As of 2015, the double-tracking project reached 80% completion. In 2024, Union Pacific announced the resumption of work to add the second main line on the remaining 127 miles (204 km) of single-track railway.

The new trackage would allow for maximum speeds of 70 miles per hour (110 km/h) for freight trains. It would incorporate concrete sleeper railroad ties, a track spacing of 20 feet (6 m), and a rail weight of 141 pounds per yard (70 kg/m), which are Union Pacific's standards for tracks supporting heavy axle loads and for new double-track construction.

== Subdivisions ==
The Union Pacific has divided the Sunset Route into these subdivisions for operational purposes:

- Yuma Subdivision
- Gila Subdivision
- Lordsburg Subdivision
- Valentine Subdivision
- Sanderson Subdivision
- Del Rio Subdivision
- Glidden Subdivision
- Houston Subdivision
- Lafayette Subdivision
- Terminal Subdivision

== See also ==
- Central Corridor (Union Pacific Railroad)
- List of railroad crossings of the North American continental divide
- Southern Transcon

== Bibliography ==
- Connell, David (March 28, 2008). Expanding Capacity on Union Pacific's Sunset Route (PDF). Union Pacific.
- Hofsommer, Donovan L. (1986). The Southern Pacific, 1901-1985. Texas A & M University Press. ISBN 9781603441278. OCLC 13333145.
- Southern Pacific Company (1904). Wayside Notes Along the Sunset Route, Eastward from San Francisco. OCLC 58904846 – via Google Books.
- Southern Pacific Company (1911). Wayside Notes Along the Sunset Route, West Bound – via Google Books.
