= Amtrak Daily Long-Distance Service Study =

Study of passenger rail routes in the US

The Amtrak Daily Long-Distance Service Study was created by the Infrastructure Investment and Jobs Act to be completed by the Federal Railroad Administration. Its purpose is to evaluate the restoration and addition of discontinued and new long-distance passenger services in the United States, as well as the efficacy of upgrading of tri-weekly long-distance services to daily operation.

The study was completed in 2025. It identified over a dozen routes that were good candidates for reactivation or creation, which would provide rail service to an additional 39 million people. Highlights included restoring service to South Dakota and Wyoming, which are currently have no passenger rail service whatsoever; service from Seattle to Denver that would connect Idaho population centers; turning Dallas/Fort Worth into a rail hub with six new routes; increased service in the south and Florida; providing daily and non-overnight boarding times to benefit rural routes; service to currently unserved state capitols and population centers in Montana and North Dakota; and service to Phoenix, which is currently the largest American city without rail service.

== History ==
In November 2021, Congress passed the Infrastructure Investment and Jobs Act. Section 22214 of the law orders the Federal Railroad Administration (FRA) to study the restoration of all long-distance Amtrak routes that had been discontinued, daily service on non-daily trains (the Cardinal and Sunset Limited), and the possibility of new long-distance routes—particularly those that were discontinued upon the formation of Amtrak. The criteria for new routes under consideration is that they "link and serve large and small communities as part of a regional rail network", "advance the economic and social well-being of rural areas of the United States", "provide enhanced connectivity for the national long-distance passenger rail system", and "reflect public engagement and local and regional support for restored passenger rail service". Work on the Long-Distance Service Study began in September 2022.

In April 2023, the FRA released information that they had successfully held a series of six working group meetings during the previous February where they met with stakeholders and worked to review the study's requirements and to evaluate discontinued services. Included in the regional reports was information about current LD routes trip origin-destination pairs, as well as similar information for proposed routes. Materials from the meetings indicated that the FRA was studying 18 discontinued long-distance Amtrak routes, as well as four that were discontinued on Amtrak's creation in 1971: the City of Miami, George Washington, Pan-American, and San Francisco Chief.

In August 2023, the FRA released their second round of meeting materials, followed by the release of the FRA's interim report to congress describing their current progress in the study in November.

In February 2024, the FRA released its third round of meeting materials which included a preferred draft network of fifteen new long-distance routes. The plan would increase the coverage of the long-distance Amtrak network by 23,200 route miles, reaching an additional 45 million population, 61 metropolitan statistical areas, 24 congressional districts, twelve National Park Service sites, and two states (Wyoming and South Dakota). Another round of public input took place before the final set of actions are recommended to Congress in January 2025.

Long-Distance Service Study draft preferred routes
Designation	Route (Note: Not all stops are listed. Italics indicate cities lacking rail service at the time of the study.)	Miles (km)	Duration	Historic analog
Chicago–Miami	Chicago – Indianapolis – Louisville – Nashville – Chattanooga – Atlanta – Macon – Jacksonville – Orlando – Miami	1,529 (2,461)	36 hr	Floridian
Dallas/Fort Worth–Miami	Dallas–Fort Worth – Shreveport – Baton Rouge – New Orleans – Mobile – Pensacola – Tallahassee – Jacksonville – Miami	1,498 (2,411)	36 hr	
Denver–Houston	Denver – Colorado Springs – Trinidad – Amarillo – Dallas–Fort Worth – Bryan – Houston	1,096 (1,764)	26 hr	Texas Zephyr
Los Angeles–Denver	Los Angeles – Barstow – Las Vegas – Salt Lake City – Cheyenne – Denver	1,440 (2,320)	33 hr	Desert Wind
Phoenix–Minneapolis/St. Paul	Phoenix – Flagstaff – Albuquerque – Amarillo – Wichita – Kansas City – Omaha – Sioux Falls – Minneapolis–Saint Paul	2,186 (3,518)	48 hr	
Dallas/Fort Worth–New York	Dallas–Fort Worth – Oklahoma City – Tulsa – Springfield – St. Louis – Indianapolis – Cincinnati – Columbus – Pittsburgh – Philadelphia – New York City	1,854 (2,984)	45 hr	National Limited
Houston–New York	Houston – New Orleans – Mobile – Montgomery – Atlanta – Chattanooga – Lynchburg – Washington, D.C. – Philadelphia – New York City	1,840 (2,960)	44 hr	Southerner
Seattle–Denver	Seattle – Portland – Boise – Pocatello – Salt Lake City – Grand Junction – Denver	1,671 (2,689)	40 hr	Pioneer
San Antonio–Minneapolis/St. Paull	San Antonio – Dallas–Fort Worth – Tulsa – Kansas City – Des Moines – Minneapolis–Saint Paul	1,572 (2,530)	32 hr	Twin Star Rocket
San Francisco–Dallas/Fort Worth	San Francisco – Bakersfield – Barstow – Phoenix – Tucson – El Paso – Midland – Dallas–Fort Worth	1,911 (3,075)	43 hr	
Detroit–New Orleans	Detroit – Columbus – Cincinnati – Louisville – Nashville – Birmingham – Montgomery – Mobile – New Orleans	1,246 (2,005)	29 hr	Pan-American
Denver–Minneapolis/St. Paul	Denver – Cheyenne – Rapid City – Pierre – Sioux Falls – Minneapolis–Saint Paul	1,136 (1,828)	26 hr	
Seattle–Chicago	Seattle – Yakima – Spokane – Sandpoint – Helena – Billings – Bismarck – Fargo – Minneapolis–Saint Paul – Milwaukee – Chicago	2,096 (3,373)	50 hr	North Coast Hiawatha
Dallas/Fort Worth–Atlanta	Dallas–Fort Worth – Shreveport – Jackson – Meridian – Birmingham – Atlanta	870 (1,400)	22 hr	
El Paso–Billings	El Paso – Las Cruces – Albuquerque – Trinidad – Colorado Springs – Denver – Cheyenne – Casper – Billings	1,393 (2,242)	31 hr	Shoshone

== Sources ==
- "Regional Working Group Meeting 1" (PDF). Federal Railroad Administration. 2023. Archived (PDF) from the original on February 25, 2024.
- "Regional Working Group Meeting 2" (PDF). Federal Railroad Administration. 2023. Archived (PDF) from the original on August 10, 2023.
- "Regional Working Group Meeting 3" (PDF). Federal Railroad Administration. 2024. Archived (PDF) from the original on February 20, 2024.
- "Regional Working Group Meeting 4" (PDF). Federal Railroad Administration. 2024.
- "Amtrak Daily Long-Distance Service Study Final Report". Federal Railroad Administration. January 2025.
