= Long-distance Amtrak routes =

Intercity train routes in the United States

Long Distance Service Line
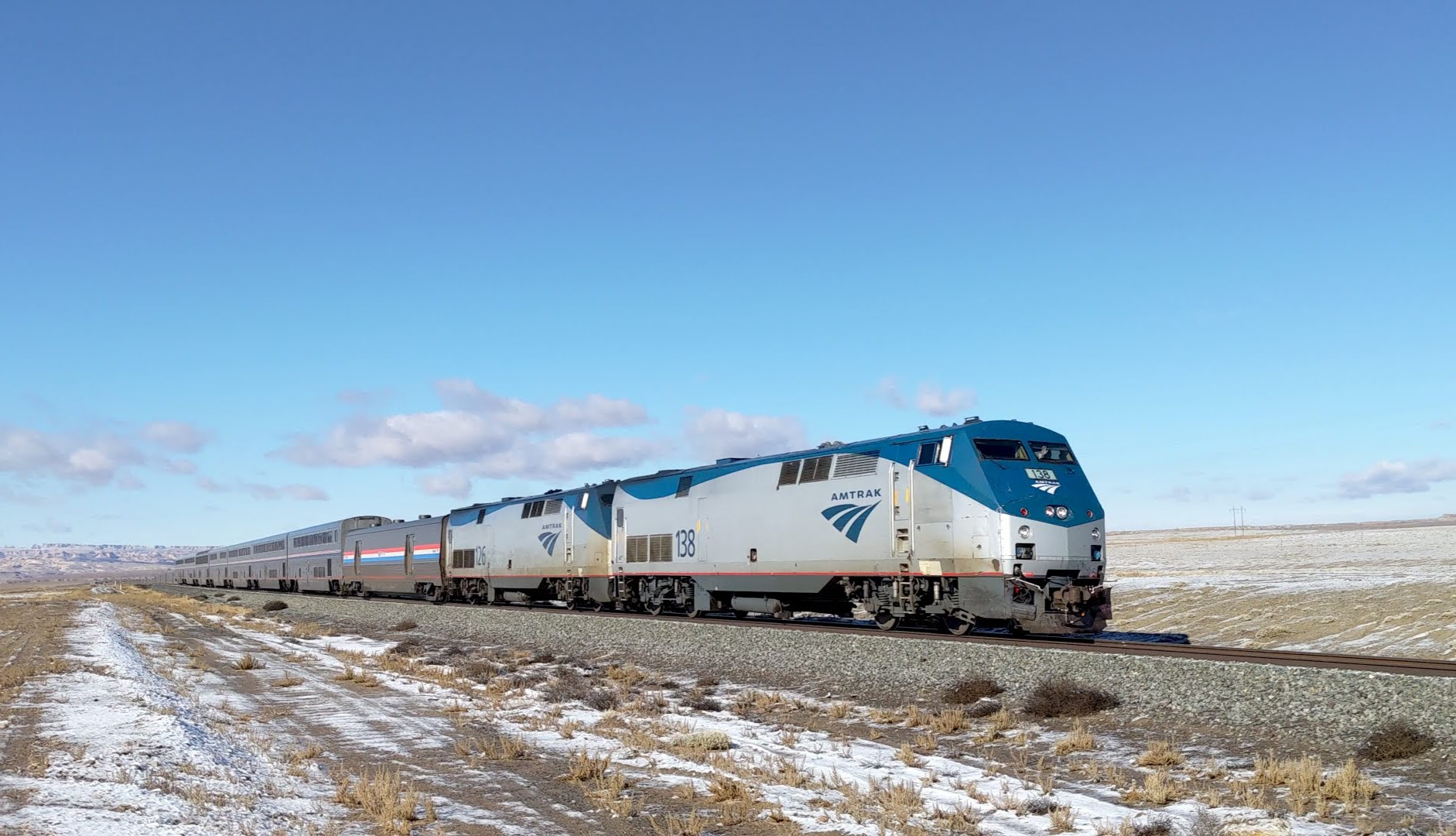
- The California Zephyr north of Green River in November 2023

Overview
- Locale: Contiguous United States
- Transit type: Inter-city rail
- Number of lines: 14
- Number of stations: 300+
- Annual ridership: 4,449,602
- Headquarters: Washington, DC
- Website: Long Distance Trains – Amtrak

Operation
- Began operation: May 1, 1971
- Operator: Amtrak
- Reporting marks: AMTK, AMTZ

Technical
- Track gauge: 4 ft 8 1/2 in (1,435 mm) standard gauge
- Average speed: 48 mph (77 km/h) between stations
- Top speed: 125 mph (201 km/h) (NEC)

The Long Distance Service Line is the division of Amtrak responsible for operating all intercity passenger train services in the United States longer than 750 miles (1,210 km). There are fourteen such routes as of 2024, serving over 300 stations in 39 states.

Amtrak's long-distance routes form the backbone of the US national rail network, providing an alternative to intercity drives or flights. They are also noted for their scenery, and are popular as vacations and experiential travel. A few routes provide direct service to national parks, (Note: The Empire Builder serves Glacier National Park and the Cardinal serves New River Gorge National Park.) with Amtrak Thruway buses reaching many more.

The rider experience of Amtrak's long-distance trains is distinct from its Northeast Corridor and state-supported services. All trains except the Palmetto involve at least one night of travel, and so are equipped with sleeping and dining cars. Routes depart once daily in each direction, at most, so some stops are served only at night. Delays are commonplace on long-distance trains, as the tracks are generally controlled by freight railroad companies, who prioritize freight trains over passenger trains.

While anchored by major cities, long-distance trains also serve many rural communities en route (unlike commercial flights). A minority of passengers ride an entire route at once, with most traveling between a terminus and an intermediate stop. In FY2025, Amtrak's long-distance trains carried 4,449,602 riders, around 13% of the company's total. However, the routes account for about 42% of passenger miles traveled.

== Operations ==
=== Rolling stock ===
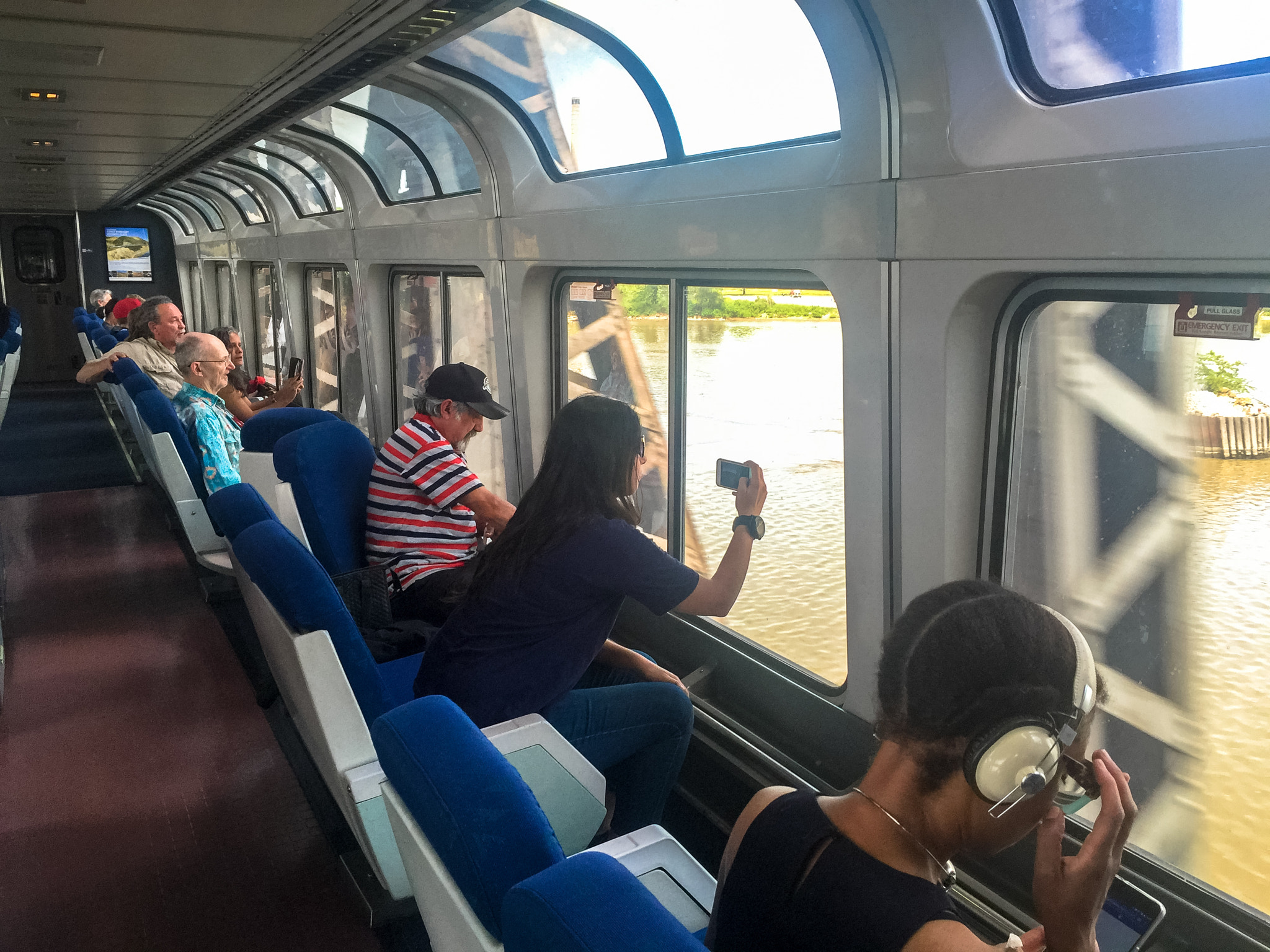
The Superliner Sightseer Lounge aboard the Southwest Chief

Amtrak operates two types of long-distance trains: single-level and bi-level. Due to height restrictions on the Northeast Corridor, all six routes that terminate at New York Penn Station operate as single-level trains with Amfleet coaches and Viewliner sleeping cars. The remaining nine long-distance routes operate as bi-level trains with Superliner coaches and sleeping cars. Both single-level and bi-level trains are equipped with Viewliner baggage cars. Most bi-level trains include a sightseer lounge for passengers to enjoy the scenery. Amtrak plans to replace all of its long-distance rail cars by 2032, except for the Viewliner II fleet.

Long-distance trains are typically hauled by GE Genesis and Siemens ALC-42 diesel-electric locomotives. Trains use Siemens ACS-64 electric locomotives on the Northeast Corridor, then switch engines at Washington Union Station to continue into non-electrified territory. Amtrak is currently replacing all of its long-distance locomotives with 125 Siemens ALC-42 units by 2032. In 2022, the Empire Builder became the first route to receive the new locomotives.

=== Speed ===
In FY2022, Amtrak's long-distance trains averaged 48 mph (77 km/h) between stations. Dwell time at stations averaged four minutes each, while dwell time at stations with crew changes or enroute servicing averaged 20 minutes each. Trains operating on the Northeast Corridor reach top speeds of 125 mph (201 km/h) in some stretches. The top speed for long-distance trains outside the northeast is 100 mph (160 km/h), reached by the Texas Eagle between Chicago and St. Louis.

=== Dividing trains ===
In a practice not seen elsewhere in the Amtrak network, some long-distance trains divide or couple partway along their routes. This allows trains to serve multiple endpoints without requiring passengers to transfer, and provides efficiency over the shared route segments. Westbound from Chicago the Empire Builder divides at Spokane, with sections to Seattle and Portland. Eastbound from Chicago the Lake Shore Limited divides at Albany–Rensselaer, with sections to New York and Boston. The Texas Eagle and Sunset Limited are combined between Los Angeles and San Antonio, where the Texas Eagle continues to Chicago and the Sunset Limited to New Orleans. On the reverse trips the trains are coupled at these stations.

=== Baggage, bicycles, and pets ===
All long-distance trains have checked baggage service, except for the Auto Train, which instead allows passengers to transport items in their vehicles. On all other routes, passengers are allowed two personal items, two carry-on bags, and two free checked bags. Two additional bags, oversized bags, and bicycles may be checked for a fee ($20). However, baggage and bikes cannot be checked at certain stations. Small dogs and cats in carriers are allowed on trips shorter than seven hours for an additional fee. Service animals are exempt from pet restrictions.

=== Dining ===
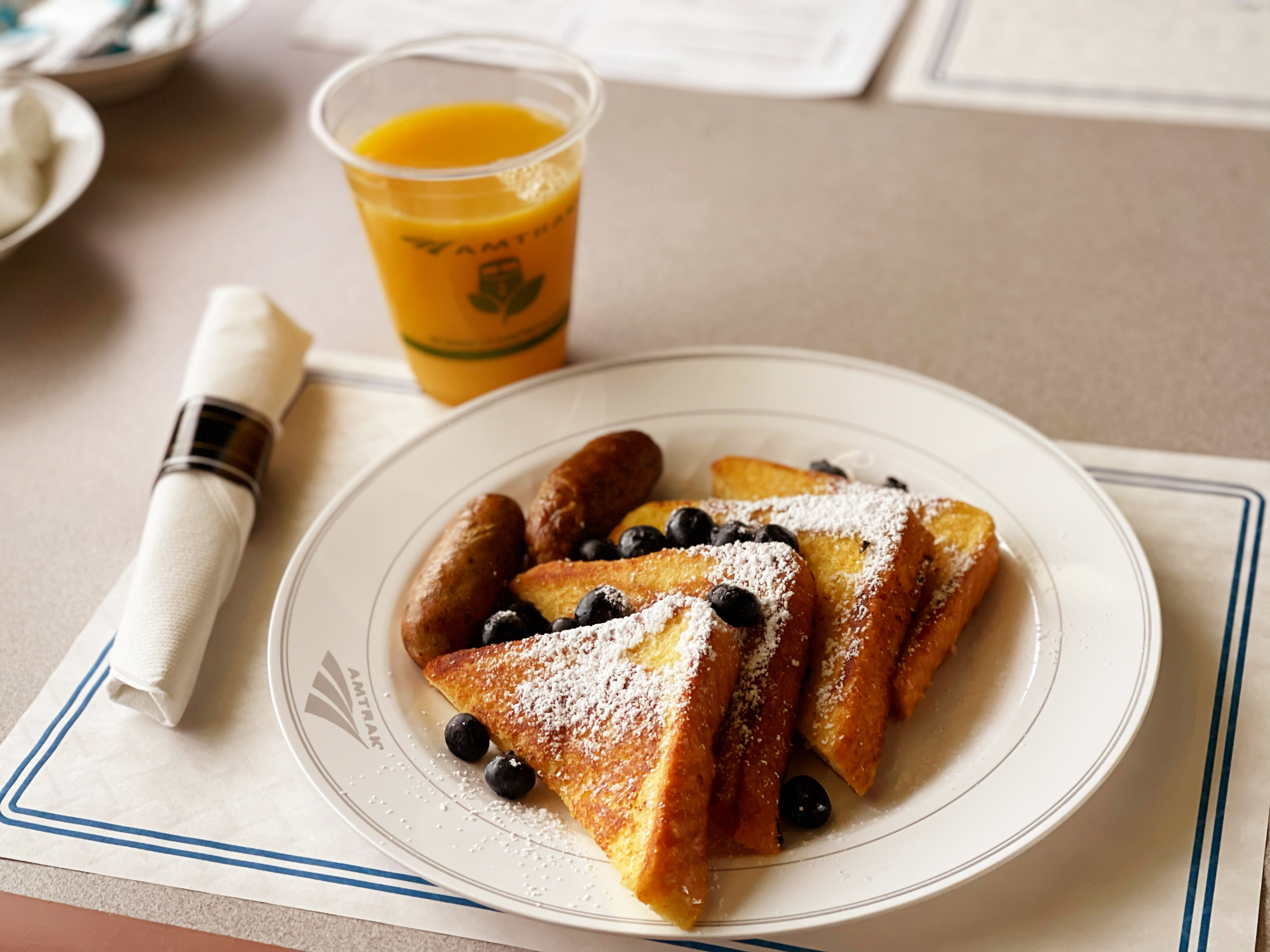
Dining car breakfast served aboard the California Zephyr

All long-distance routes have café car service offering takeaway meals, snacks, drinks, and alcohol. As of 2023, sleeping car passengers also have access to one of two types of restaurant-style dining. Traditional Dining is available on eight routes and consists of full table service in a dining car. Six routes instead feature Flexible Dining, where passengers may order hot meals to be delivered to their room or lounge. Passengers may also bring their own food and drinks.

=== Wi-Fi and cell service ===
Amtrak provides free basic Wi-Fi on seven of its long-distance routes: the Auto Train, Cardinal, Crescent, Lake Shore Limited, Palmetto, Silver Meteor, and Floridian. The service is intended to support low-bandwidth uses only. Onboard internet is dependent on cell towers along the route of the train, so speed and availability correspond to regional cell coverage.

== Routes ==
Name	Terminus		Numbers	Miles (km)	Average duration	Passenger cars	Dining	Wi-Fi	Round trips per week
Palmetto	Savannah	New York	89, 90	829 (1,334)	15 hr 19 min	Amfleet (Note: No sleeping car service.)	Café only	Yes	7
Cardinal	Chicago	New York	50, 51	1,147 (1,846)	26 hr 30 min	Amfleet II, Viewliner	Flexible	Yes	3
Crescent	New Orleans	New York	19, 20	1,377 (2,216)	30 hr	Amfleet II, Viewliner	Flexible	Yes	7
Lake Shore Limited (Note: Train divides at Albany–Rensselaer.)	Chicago	New York	48, 49	959 (1,543)	19 hr 41 min	Amfleet II, Viewliner	Flexible	Yes	7
Lake Shore Limited	Chicago	Boston	448, 449	1,018 (1,638)	21 hr 45 min	Amfleet II, Viewliner	Flexible	Yes	7
Silver Meteor	Miami	New York	97, 98	1,389 (2,235)	27 hr 44 min	Amfleet II, Viewliner	Traditional	Yes	7
Floridian (Note: A temporary combination of the Capitol Limited and Silver Star due to construction in the East River Tunnels and the higher demand for Superliner cars on the western routes.)	Chicago	Miami	40, 41	2,076 (3,341)	47 hr	Amfleet II, Viewliner	Traditional	Yes	7
City of New Orleans	New Orleans	Chicago	58, 59	926 (1,490)	19 hr	Superliner	Flexible	No	7
Auto Train (Note: Vehicle-transport train; only passengers transporting a car may ride. Makes no intermediate stops.)	Sanford, Florida	Lorton, Virginia	52, 53	855 (1,376)	17 hr 29 min	Superliner	Traditional	Yes	7
California Zephyr	Emeryville, California	Chicago	5, 6	2,438 (3,924)	51 hr 20 min	Superliner	Traditional	No	7
Coast Starlight	Seattle	Los Angeles	11, 14	1,377 (2,216)	35 hr	Superliner	Traditional	No	7
Empire Builder (Note: Train divides at Spokane.)	Seattle	Chicago	7, 8	2,206 (3,550)	45 hr 43 min	Superliner	Traditional	No	7
Empire Builder	Portland, Oregon	Chicago	27, 28	2,257 (3,632)	45 hr 23 min	Superliner	Traditional	No	7
Southwest Chief	Los Angeles	Chicago	3, 4	2,256 (3,631)	43 hr	Superliner	Traditional	No	7
Sunset Limited	Los Angeles	New Orleans	1, 2	1,995 (3,211)	46 hr 8 min	Superliner	Traditional	No	3
Texas Eagle (Note: Combines with the Sunset Limited between San Antonio and Los Angeles three days per week.)	Los Angeles	Chicago	421, 422	2,728 (4,390)	65 hr 45 min	Superliner	Traditional (LAX–SAS)	No	3
Texas Eagle	San Antonio	Chicago	21, 22	1,306 (2,102)	31 hr 30 min	Superliner	Flexible	No	7

== History ==
Amtrak's long-distance network is a legacy of the railroad age, when trains operated by private railroad companies were the fastest and sometimes only mode of intercity transportation. The mid-20th century saw steep disinvestment in passenger rail relative to air and highway travel. Passenger trains became financial burdens for railroad companies, who sought to discontinue them. As a solution, Congress created Amtrak, a government-owned company, to operate intercity rail as a public service. Most railroads opted-in and transferred their passenger rail operations to Amtrak on May 1, 1971. After the Southern Railway opted-in to Amtrak in 1979, and the Denver and Rio Grande Western Railroad in 1983, Amtrak was left as the sole long-distance train operator in the US.

In the Passenger Rail Investment and Improvement Act of 2008 (PRIIA), Congress divided Amtrak's routes into three strictly defined service lines: Northeast Corridor routes, short distance corridors (less than 750 mi (1,210 km)), and long-distance routes of more than 750 mi (1,210 km). Unlike short distance "state-supported" corridors, long-distance routes could continue to receive full federal funding.

=== Major route changes ===
The long-distance network has been subject to periodic changes over the decades in response to internal and external pressures. Just four named long-distance trains have operated continuously since the formation of Amtrak (excepting short-term outages): the Sunset Limited, Empire Builder, Silver Meteor, and Coast Starlight.

==== 1970s ====
In Amtrak's first year, 1971, it significantly overhauled the long-distance rail network in the United States. In addition to selecting which existing routes to retain, Amtrak created several new routes: the Coast Starlight, North Coast Hiawatha, and Lake Shore. It also renamed several routes: the Spirit of St. Louis became the National Limited, the City of New Orleans the Panama Limited, and the South Wind the Floridian. The following year, 1972, the City of San Francisco was renamed the San Francisco Zephyr and the Lake Shore was discontinued.

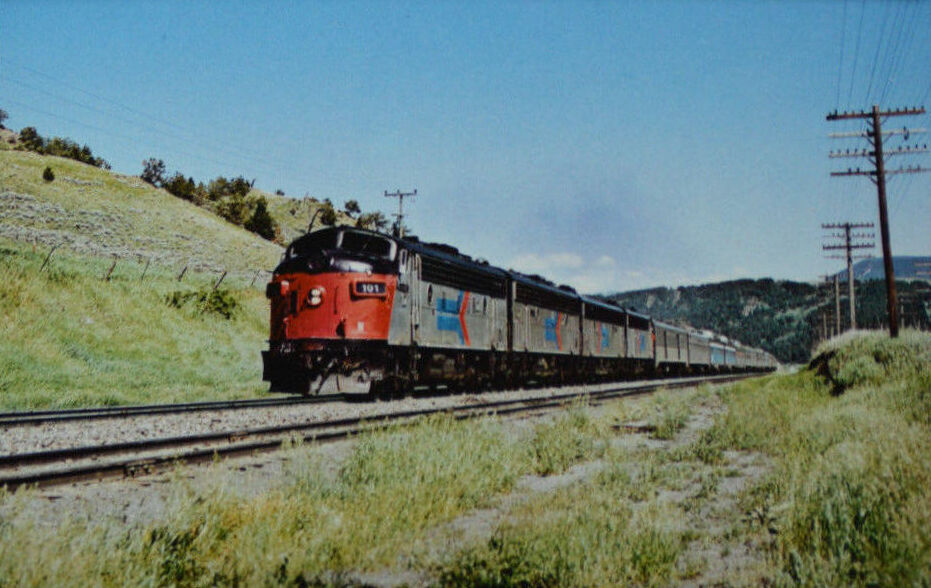
The North Coast Hiawatha (1971–1979) at Bozeman Pass en route to Billings

The Inter-American entered service in 1973 as short-distance train between Laredo and Fort Worth. It was extended north to St. Louis in 1974 and further to Chicago in 1976. In 1974 Amtrak renamed the Super Chief to the Southwest Limited and the Texas Chief to the Lone Star following the Atchison, Topeka and Santa Fe Railway revoking permission to use the "Chief" names.

The Mountaineer and Lake Shore Limited began service in 1975, and the Palmetto in 1976. The Mountaineer lasted only until 1977, at which point it was replaced by the Hilltopper. The Pioneer also entered service in 1977, and the James Whitcomb Riley was renamed the Cardinal.

1979 was a year of major restructuring. Six long-distance routes were discontinued by the Carter Administration for not meeting a minimum farebox recovery ratio: the Lone Star, Champion, North Coast Hiawatha, National Limited, Floridian, and Hilltopper. As limited compensation, a Houston section was added to the Inter-American, a St. Petersburg section to the Silver Meteor, and the Empire Builder was rerouted to St. Cloud. Meanwhile, the Southern Railway transferred its last remaining passenger route, the Southern Crescent, to Amtrak, who renamed it the Crescent. The Desert Wind also entered service in 1979.

==== 1980s ====
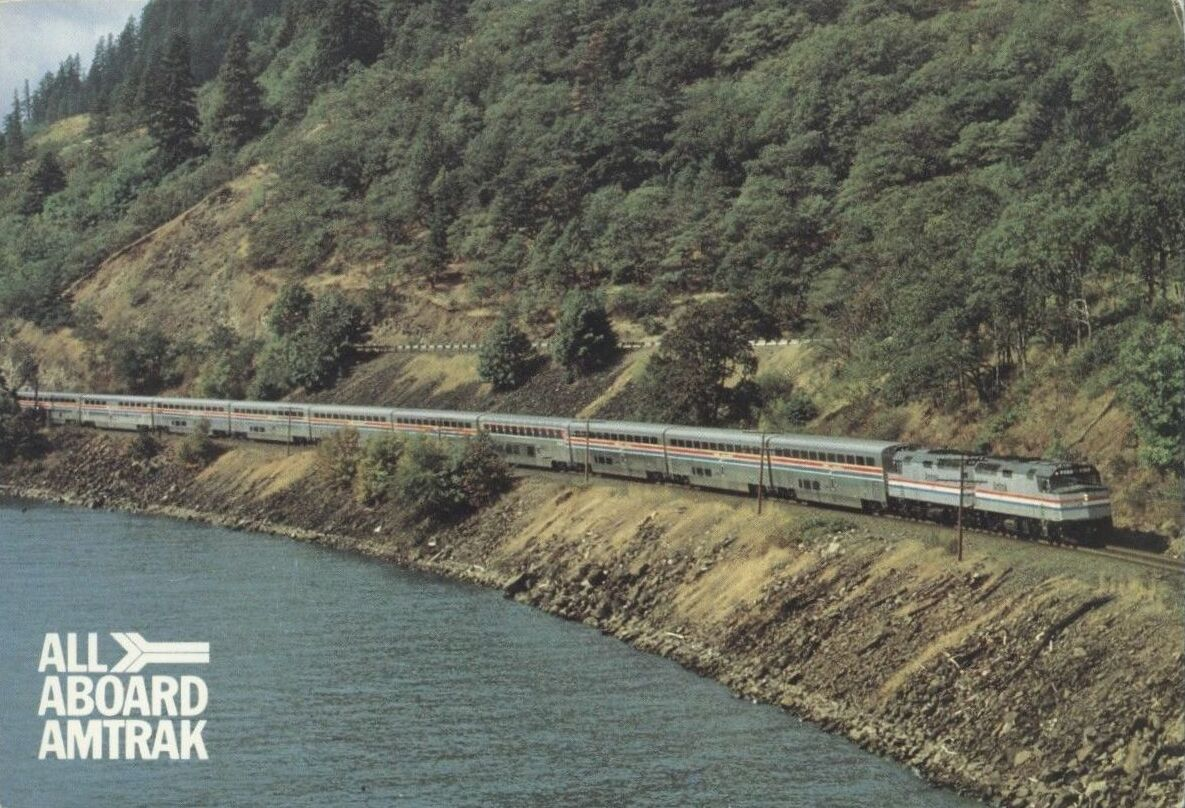
The Pioneer (1977–1997) in the Columbia River Gorge en route from Boise in the 1980s

In 1981 the Capitol Limited began service, while the Inter-American was truncated to San Antonio, stripped of its Houston section, and renamed the Eagle. The Empire Builder was rerouted to Wenatchee, bypassing the Yakima Valley, while a Portland section was added. The Panama Limited was renamed back to the City of New Orleans in hopes of capitalizing on the song of the same name.

The Denver and Rio Grande Western Railroad opted-in to Amtrak in 1983. As a result, Amtrak rerouted its San Francisco Zephyr over the former route of the D&RGW's Rio Grande Zephyr between Denver and Salt Lake City, renaming the train the California Zephyr. Amtrak also began operating the Auto Train in 1983.

In 1984 Amtrak renamed the Southwest Limited to the Southwest Chief alongside the deployment of Superliner equipment, and also initiated the River Cities as a section of the City of New Orleans. In 1988 the Eagle was renamed the Texas Eagle, and in 1989 Amtrak began the Gulf Breeze as a section of the Crescent.

==== 1990s ====
In 1990 the Capitol Limited and Broadway Limited were rerouted between Pittsburgh and Chicago, bypassing Fort Wayne. The Capitol Limited was moved to serve Cleveland and South Bend, the Broadway Limited to Youngstown and Akron.

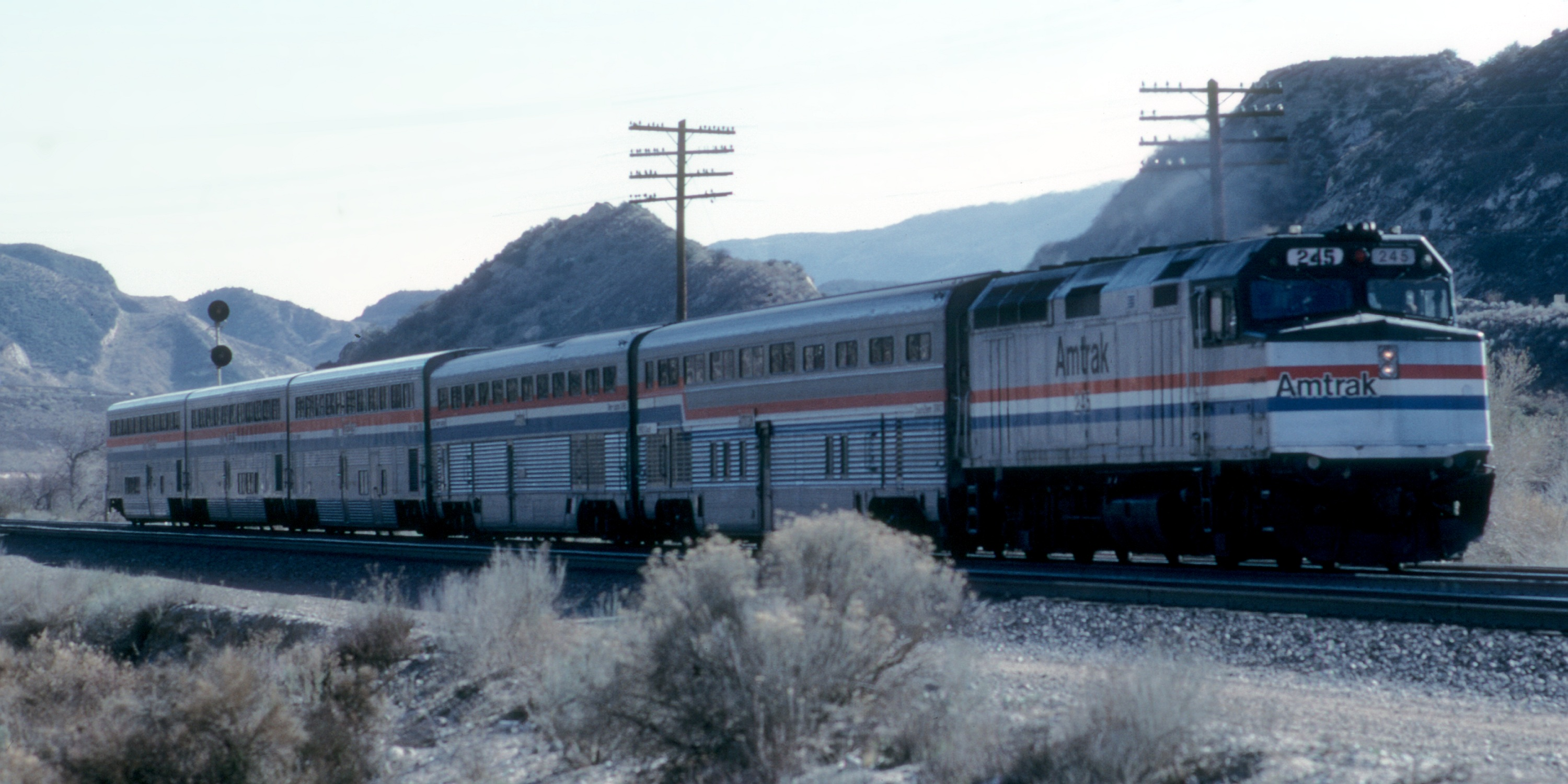
The Desert Wind (1979–1997) at Cajon Pass en route from Las Vegas in 1991

Amtrak extended the Sunset Limited east to Florida in 1993, creating its only coast-to-coast route. The River Cities was discontinued the same year.

Amtrak discontinued the Tampa section of the Silver Meteor in 1994.

In 1995 Amtrak discontinued the Gulf Breeze, Palmetto, and Broadway Limited, the latter being partially replaced with the short-distance Three Rivers. Meanwhile, the City of New Orleans was rerouted west to Greenwood between Memphis and Jackson.

In 1996 the Three Rivers was extended to Chicago and the Silver Palm was introduced, essentially restoring service on the routes of the Broadway Limited and Palmetto that had ended the prior year. The Sunset Limited was rerouted to bypass Phoenix at the request of Union Pacific.

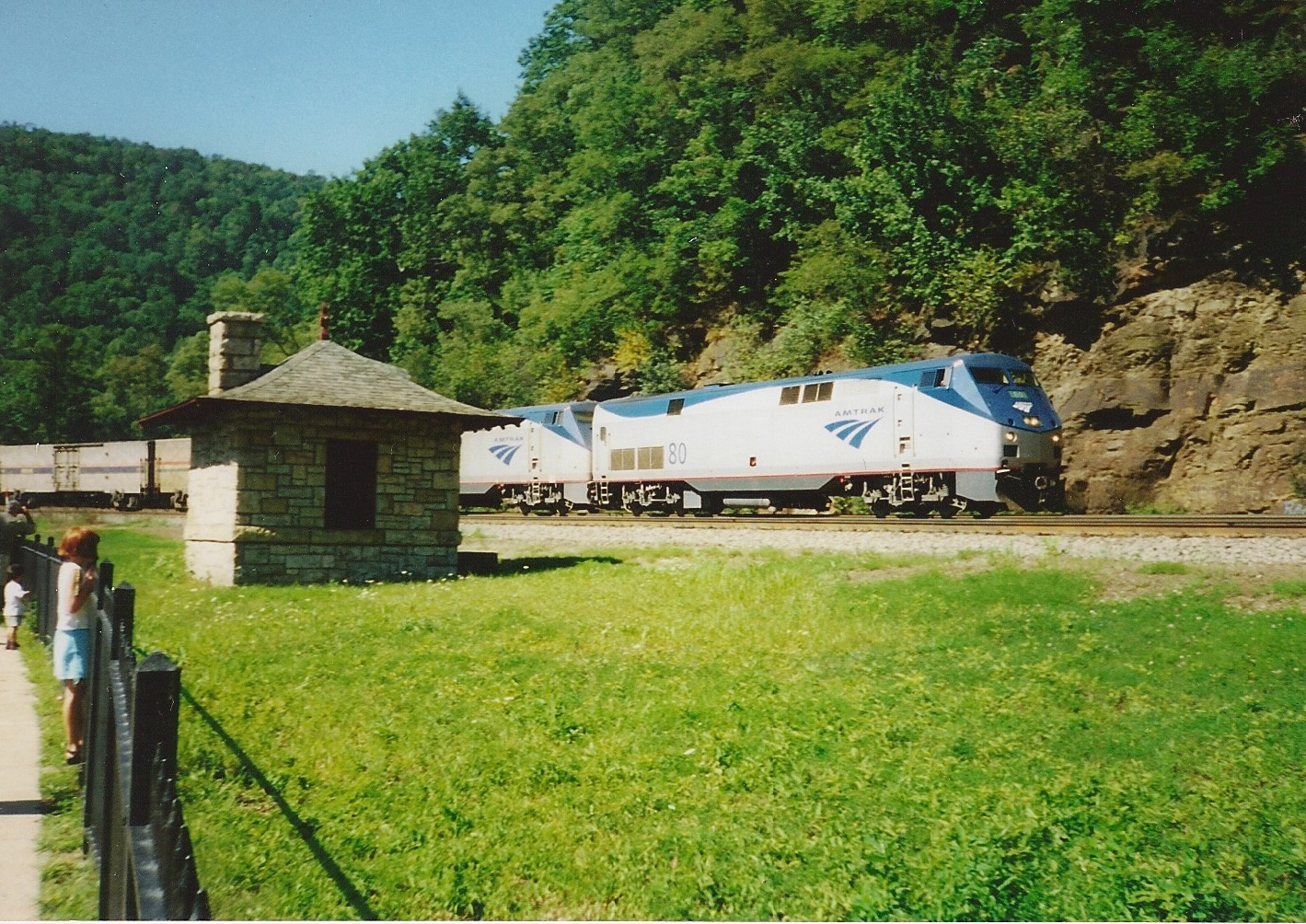
The Three Rivers (1995–2005) rounding Horseshoe Curve in 2002

In 1997, funding issues forced Amtrak to discontinue the Desert Wind and Pioneer, severing Las Vegas, Wyoming, and Southern Idaho from the rail network.

==== 2000s ====
The Silver Palm was renamed to Palmetto in 2002, restoring the route's former name. In 2004, the Palmetto was truncated to Savannah, resulting in the rerouting of the Silver Star to serve Tampa.

In 2005 the Three Rivers was discontinued following the cancellation of a related Postal Service contract. That same year, the Sunset Limited was suspended east of New Orleans due to track damage from Hurricane Katrina.

==== 2020s ====
In November 2024 Amtrak truncated the Silver Star at Washington and merged it with the Capitol Limited, creating a single Chicago–Washington–Miami route: the Floridian. This was the first direct train service between the Midwest and Florida since the 1979 discontinuance of the original Floridian, albeit following a longer route.

==== Table of discontinued Amtrak long-distance routes ====
Discontinued Amtrak long-distance routes
Name	Year started (Note: Start year under Amtrak (min 1971))	Year discontinued	Eastern terminus	Western terminus	Later analog
James Whitcomb Riley	1971	1977	Washington, DC	Chicago, IL	Cardinal
Mountaineer	1975	1977	Norfolk, VA	Chicago, IL	Hilltopper
Champion	1971	1979	New York, NY	St. Petersburg, FL	Silver Meteor
Floridian	1971	1979	Miami, FL St. Petersburg, FL	Chicago, IL	
Hilltopper	1977	1979	Boston, MA	Catlettsburg, KY	Night Owl
Lone Star	1974	1979	Chicago, IL	Houston, TX	Inter-American
National Limited	1971	1979	New York, NY	Kansas City, MO	
North Coast Hiawatha	1971	1979	Chicago, IL	Seattle, WA	
Inter-American	1973	1981	Chicago, IL	Laredo, TX	Texas Eagle
River Cities	1984	1993	New Orleans, LA	Kansas City, MO	
Gulf Breeze	1989	1995	New York, NY	Mobile, AL	
Texas Eagle - Houston (Note: Specifically refers to the Houston service)	1988	1995	Chicago, IL	Houston, TX	
Sunset Limited - Phoenix	1971	1996	New Orleans, LA	Los Angeles, CA	Amtrak Thruway
Desert Wind	1979	1997	Chicago, IL	Los Angeles, CA	
Pioneer	1977	1997	Chicago, IL	Seattle, WA	
Silver Palm/Palmetto	1982/1976	1985/1995	New York, NY	Tampa, FL Miami, FL	
Sunset Limited - East	1993	2005	Orlando, FL Miami, FL	Los Angeles, CA	
Broadway Limited/Three Rivers	1971, 1995	1995, 2005	New York, NY	Chicago, IL	

== Proposed expansion ==
In 2017, North Carolina and Connecticut were in talks to extend the Carolinian from New York to New Haven. The resultant 779-mile (1,254 km) route would cross the 750-mile (1,210 km) threshold required to categorize the Carolinian as a long-distance train, thus freeing North Carolina of its funding obligations.

=== Long-Distance Service Study ===
In November 2021, Congress passed the Infrastructure Investment and Jobs Act. Section 22214 of the law orders the Federal Railroad Administration (FRA) to study the restoration of all long-distance Amtrak routes that had been discontinued, daily service on non-daily trains (the Cardinal and Sunset Limited), and the possibility of new long-distance routes—particularly those that were discontinued upon the formation of Amtrak.

Work on the Amtrak Daily Long-Distance Service Study began in September 2022. Materials published in February 2023 indicated that the FRA was studying 18 discontinued long-distance Amtrak routes, as well as four that were discontinued in 1971: the City of Miami, George Washington, Pan-American, and San Francisco Chief.

In February 2024, the FRA released its preferred draft network of fifteen new long-distance routes. The plan would increase the coverage of the long-distance Amtrak network by 23,200 route miles, reaching an additional 45 million population, 61 metropolitan statistical areas, 24 congressional districts, twelve National Park Service sites, and two states (Wyoming and South Dakota).

The final report for the study, which was released in January 2025, creates a foundation for further planning of potential future long-distance passenger rail services. It identifies preferred route options, capital project priorities, cost estimates, public benefits, and ways Amtrak can collaborate with communities to enhance service. The recommended routes aim to improve access for rural and underserved populations, connect with other rail services, and address past service discontinuations.

Long-Distance Service Study preferred routes
Designation	Route (Note: Not all stops are listed. Italics indicate cities lacking rail service at the time of the study.)	Stations	Miles (km)	Duration	Historic analog
Chicago–Miami	Chicago – Indianapolis – Louisville – Nashville – Chattanooga – Atlanta – Macon – Jacksonville – Orlando – Miami	37	1,531 (2,464)	36 hr	Floridian
Dallas/Fort Worth–Miami	Dallas–Fort Worth – Shreveport – Baton Rouge – New Orleans – Mobile – Pensacola – Tallahassee – Jacksonville – Miami	35	1,507 (2,425)	36 hr	Gulf Wind
Denver–Houston	Denver – Colorado Springs – Trinidad – Amarillo – Dallas–Fort Worth – Bryan – Houston	21	1,088 (1,751)	25 hr	Texas Zephyr
Los Angeles–Denver	Los Angeles – Barstow – Las Vegas – Salt Lake City – Cheyenne – Denver	24	1,423 (2,290)	33 hr	Desert Wind
Phoenix–Minneapolis/St. Paul	Phoenix – Flagstaff – Albuquerque – Amarillo – Wichita – Kansas City – Omaha – Sioux Falls – Minneapolis–Saint Paul	32	2,135 (3,436)	47 hr	
Dallas/Fort Worth–New York	Dallas–Fort Worth – Oklahoma City – Tulsa – Springfield – St. Louis – Indianapolis – Cincinnati – Columbus – Pittsburgh – Philadelphia – New York City	33	1,907 (3,069)	44 hr	National Limited
Houston–New York	Houston – New Orleans – Mobile – Montgomery – Atlanta – Chattanooga – Lynchburg – Washington, D.C. – Philadelphia – New York City	42	1,841 (2,963)	43 hr	Southerner
Seattle–Denver	Seattle – Portland – Boise – Pocatello – Salt Lake City – Grand Junction – Denver	29	1,647 (2,651)	40 hr	Pioneer
San Antonio–Minneapolis/St. Paul	San Antonio – Dallas–Fort Worth – Tulsa – Kansas City – Des Moines – Minneapolis–Saint Paul	28	1,292 (2,079)	32 hr	Twin Star Rocket
San Francisco–Dallas/Fort Worth	San Francisco – Bakersfield – Barstow – Phoenix – Tucson – El Paso – Midland – Dallas–Fort Worth	29	1,906 (3,067)	42 hr	
Detroit–New Orleans	Detroit – Columbus – Cincinnati – Louisville – Nashville – Birmingham – Montgomery – Mobile – New Orleans	30	1,244 (2,002)	29 hr	Pan-American
Denver–Minneapolis/St. Paul	Denver – Cheyenne – Rapid City – Pierre – Sioux Falls – Minneapolis–Saint Paul	20	1,143 (1,839)	26 hr	
Seattle–Chicago	Seattle – Yakima – Spokane – Sandpoint – Helena – Billings – Bismarck – Fargo – Minneapolis–Saint Paul – Milwaukee – Chicago	34	2,314 (3,724)	50 hr	North Coast Hiawatha
Dallas/Fort Worth–Atlanta	Dallas–Fort Worth – Shreveport – Jackson – Meridian – Birmingham – Atlanta	15	855 (1,376)	22 hr	
El Paso–Billings	El Paso – Las Cruces – Albuquerque – Trinidad – Colorado Springs – Denver – Cheyenne – Casper – Billings	23	1,390 (2,240)	31 hr	Shoshone

== Sources ==
- Schafer, Mike (1991). All Aboard Amtrak: 1971–1991. Piscataway, New Jersey: Railpace Co. ISBN 978-0-9621-5414-0. OCLC 24545029. OL 1555952M.
- Thoms, William E. (1973). Reprieve for the Iron Horse: The AMTRAK Experiment–Its Predecessors and Prospects. Baton Rouge, LA: Claitor's Publishing Division. OCLC 1094744.
