= List of named passenger trains of the United States (S–Z) =

This article contains a list of named passenger trains in the United States, with names beginning S through Z.

== S ==
Train Name	Railroad	Train Endpoints in a typical [year]	Operated
Sacramento	Southern Pacific	Los Angeles, California–Sacramento, California [1922]	1921–1924
Sacramento Daylight	Southern Pacific	Los Angeles, California–Sacramento, California [1953]	1946–1971
Safety Express	Chessie System		1980–1981
Sailor	Pennsylvania Railroad	Cape Charles, Virginia-New York, New York [1946]	c. 1946
Saint	Santa Fe	Los Angeles, California–San Francisco, California–San Diego, California [1911]	1911–1917
St. Clair	Amtrak	Chicago, Illinois–Detroit, Michigan [1972]	1971–1980
St. Joseph Limited	Missouri Pacific	St. Louis, Missouri–St. Joseph, Missouri [1905]	1903–1907
St. Lawrence Express	New York Central	New York, New York–Utica, New York	?
St. Louis and Chicago Express	Pennsylvania	Pittsburgh, Pennsylvania–St. Louis, Missouri–Chicago, Illinois [1925]	1920–1927
St. Louis and Colorado Express	Rock Island	St. Louis, Missouri–Denver, Colorado (with through cars to Los Angeles) [1930]	1919–1934
St. Louis and Kansas City Express	Missouri Pacific	St. Louis, Missouri–Denver, Colorado [1905]	1900–1910
St. Louis and New Orleans Limited	Illinois Central	St. Louis, Missouri–New Orleans, Louisiana [1905]	1897–1910
St. Louis Express	Illinois Central	St. Louis, Missouri–New Orleans, Louisiana [1905]	1900–1910
St. Louis Express	Illinois Central	Chicago, Illinois–St. Louis, Missouri [1926]	1923–1931
St. Louis Express	Baltimore & Ohio Railroad	New York, New York–St. Louis, Missouri [1905]	1897–1899; 1903–1916
St. Louis Express	Pennsylvania	New York, New York–St. Louis, Missouri [1905]	1900–1913
St. Louis Express	Missouri–Kansas–Texas Railroad	St. Louis, Missouri–San Antonio, Texas–Houston, Texas [1906]	1903–1910
St. Louis Express	Chicago and Eastern Illinois Railroad	Chicago, Illinois–St. Louis, Missouri [1910]	1907–1913
St. Louis Express	Wabash	St. Louis, Missouri–Denver, Colorado (earlier years had through trains to the West Coast) (1932)	1921–1933
St. Louis Limited	Wabash	Detroit, Michigan–St. Louis, Missouri [1950]	1939–1968
St. Louis Limited	Frisco	St. Louis, Missouri–Galveston, Texas [1922]	1896–1908; 1917–1926
St. Louis Limited	Pennsylvania	New York, New York–St. Louis, Missouri [1905]	1903–1911
St. Louis Limited	Chicago and Eastern Illinois Railroad	Chicago, Illinois–St. Louis, Missouri [1910]	1907–1913
St. Louis Limited	Wabash	St. Louis, Missouri–Omaha, Nebraska [1911]	1908–1918; 1927
St. Louis Limited	Chicago, Burlington & Quincy	St. Louis, Missouri–Denver, Colorado [1937]	1910–1916; 1932–1940
St. Louis Limited	Cleveland, Cincinnati, Chicago and St. Louis Railway	St. Louis, Missouri–Cleveland, Ohio [1928]	1925–1930
St. Louis Mail	Frisco	St. Louis, Missouri–Dallas, Texas [1906]	1890–1908
St. Louis Mule	Amtrak	St. Louis, Missouri–Kansas City, Missouri [1984]	1980–2009
St. Louis Special	Southern	Asheville, North Carolina–St. Louis, Missouri [1914]	1912–1917
St. Louis Special	Wabash (Wabash renamed train Wabash Cannon Ball 4/50)	Detroit, Michigan–St. Louis, Missouri [1944]	1937–1950
St. Louis Special	Pennsylvania	Pittsburgh, Pennsylvania–St. Louis, Missouri [1908]	1904–1913
St. Louis Special	Chicago and Eastern Illinois Railroad	Chicago, Illinois–St. Louis, Missouri [1910]	1907–1913
St. Louis Special	Cleveland, Cincinnati, Chicago and St. Louis Railway	St. Louis, Missouri–Cleveland, Ohio–Cincinnati, Ohio [1920]	1919–1948
St. Louis Special	Illinois Central	Chicago, Illinois–St. Louis, Missouri [1926]	1925–1930
St. Louis-Chicago Limited	Chicago and Eastern Illinois Railroad	Chicago, Illinois–St. Louis, Missouri [1920]	1919–1924
St. Louis-Cincinnati-New York Special	Baltimore & Ohio Railroad	New York, New York–St. Louis, Missouri–Cincinnati, Ohio [1922]	1915–1928
St. Louis-Cincinnati-Washington-New York Express	Baltimore & Ohio Railroad	New York, New York–St. Louis, Missouri–Cincinnati, Ohio [1922]	1913–1917
St. Louis-Cincinnati-Washington-New York Limited	Baltimore & Ohio Railroad	New York, New York–St. Louis, Missouri–Cincinnati, Ohio [1922]	1913–1917
St. Louis-Colorado Limited	Union Pacific, Wabash Railroad	St. Louis, Missouri–Denver, Colorado (earlier cars went through to West Coast) [1930]	1910–1916; 1925–1940
St. Louis-Jacksonville Express	Louisville and Nashville Railroad, Atlantic Coast Line Railroad	St. Louis, Missouri–Jacksonville, Florida [1926]	1919–1938
St. Louis-Twin Cities Express	Rock Island	St. Louis, Missouri–Minneapolis–Saint Paul [1918]	1911–1936
St. Louis-Twin Cities Special	Rock Island	St. Louis, Missouri–Minneapolis–Saint Paul [1918]	1911–1936
St. Louis, Colorado and Pacific Coast Express	Rock Island, Denver and Rio Grande Western Railroad, Southern Pacific	St. Louis, Missouri–Los Angeles, California [1916]	1911–1918
St. Louis, Peoria, Chicago, Indianapolis, Dayton, Springfield, Columbus and Cincinnati Express	Cleveland, Cincinnati, Chicago and St. Louis Railway	St. Louis, Missouri–Cleveland, Ohio–Cincinnati, Ohio [1905]	1902–1910
St. Louis, Peoria, Indianapolis and Cincinnati Express	Cleveland, Cincinnati, Chicago and St. Louis Railway	St. Louis, Missouri–Cincinnati, Ohio [1905]	1903–1910
St. Louisan	Pennsylvania	New York, New York–St. Louis, Missouri (with though cars to different points in different years) [1948]	1913–1967
St. Paul and Minneapolis Express	Chicago and North Western Railway	Chicago, Illinois–Minneapolis–Saint Paul [1911]	1906–1916
St. Paul-Minneapolis-Montreal Express	Minneapolis, St. Paul and Sault Ste. Marie Railroad, Canadian Pacific Railway	Minneapolis, Minnesota–Montreal, Quebec [1919]	1918–1925
St. Paul, Minneapolis and Duluth Express	Minneapolis, St. Paul and Sault Ste. Marie Railroad, Canadian Pacific Railway	Minneapolis, Minnesota–Montreal, Quebec [1903]	1903–1910
St. Paul, Minneapolis and Yankton Night Express	Great Northern	Minneapolis–Saint Paul–Yankton, South Dakota [1925]	1922–1929
Salt City Express	Amtrak	New York, New York–Syracuse, New York [1975]	1974–1980
Salt Lake Express	Union Pacific	Salt Lake City, Utah–Portland, Oregon [1915]	1910; 1914–1918
Salt Lake Special	Union Pacific	Butte, Montana–Salt Lake City, Utah [1943]	1911–1946
Salt Lake-San Francisco Express	Denver and Rio Grande Western Railroad, Western Pacific Railroad	Denver, Colorado–San Francisco, California [1930]	1918–1930
Saluki	Amtrak	Chicago, Illinois–Carbondale, Illinois [2016]	2007–present
Sam Houston Zephyr	Burlington-Rock Island Railroad	Fort Worth, Texas–Houston, Texas [1940]	1936–1966
San Diegan (group of trains)	Santa Fe; Amtrak	Los Angeles, California–San Diego, California (1948)	1938–2000 (Amtrak from 1971)
San Francisco and Chicago Limited	Denver and Rio Grande Western Railroad, San Francisco	Denver, Colorado–San Francisco, California (with through cars to Chicago) [1903]	1900–1914
San Francisco Challenger	Southern Pacific, Union Pacific, Chicago and North Western	Chicago, Illinois–San Francisco, California [1939]	1936–1948
San Francisco Chief	Santa Fe	Chicago, Illinois–San Francisco, California [1968]	1954–1971
San Francisco Express	Santa Fe	Chicago, Illinois–San Francisco, California (with through cars to other California cities) [1908]	1905–1915
San Francisco Express	Southern Pacific	San Francisco, California–Portland, Oregon [1918]	1911–1927
San Francisco Limited	Chicago and North Western Railway, Union Pacific Railroad, Southern Pacific	Chicago, Illinois–San Francisco, California–Los Angeles, California [1930]	1914–1918; 1929–1931
San Francisco Overland	see 'Overland Limited' for details		
San Francisco Zephyr	Amtrak	Chicago, Illinois–Oakland, California [1975]	1972–1983
San Joaquin	Southern Pacific, Amtrak group of trains from 1974	Los Angeles, California–San Francisco, California [1940]	1928–1941; 1974–present
San Joaquin Daylight	Southern Pacific	Los Angeles, California–San Francisco, California [1948]	1941–1971
San Joaquin Valley Flyer	Southern Pacific	Los Angeles, California–San Francisco, California [1914]	1913–1918
San Juan Express	Denver & Rio Grande Western	Alamosa, Colorado–Durango, Colorado	1937–1951
Sand Dune	New York, New Haven and Hartford	Boston–Hyannis and to Woods Hole [1955]	1949–1958
Sandusky Special	Pennsylvania	Columbus, Ohio–Sandusky, Ohio [1905]	1903–1909
Sangamon	Illinois Terminal Railroad	St. Louis, Missouri–Peoria, Illinois [1952]	1950–1956
Santa Fe De Luxe	Santa Fe	Chicago, Illinois–Los Angeles, California [1912]	1911–1918
Santa Fe Eight	Santa Fe	different California and Midwestern endpoints in different years	1916–1930
Scenic Highlander	Atlantic Coast Line Railroad	Jacksonville, Florida–Tampa, Florida [1933]	1925–1928; 1933–1938
Scenic Limited	Denver & Rio Grande Western, Missouri Pacific Railroad, and Western Pacific	St. Louis, Missouri–San Francisco, California [1940]	1915–1946
Schuylkill	Pennsylvania	Philadelphia, Pennsylvania–Hazleton, Pennsylvania [1925]	1920–1931
Schuylkill	Reading Company	Philadelphia, Pennsylvania–Pottsville, Pennsylvania [1952]	1949–1962
Scout	Santa Fe	Chicago, Illinois–Los Angeles, California [1948]	1916–1931; 1936–1953
Scranton Express	Delaware, Lackawanna and Western Railroad	New York, New York–Scranton, Pennsylvania [1922]	1919–1927; 1936
Scranton Express	Central Railroad of New Jersey, Reading Company	New York, New York–Scranton, Pennsylvania [1930]	1922–1932
Scranton Flyer	Central Railroad of New Jersey, Reading Company	Philadelphia, Pennsylvania–Scranton, Pennsylvania [1948]	1910–1949
Scrantonian	Delaware, Lackawanna and Western Railroad	New York, New York–Scranton, Pennsylvania [1945]	1942–1960
Sea Breeze	Pennsylvania	Philadelphia, Pennsylvania–Long Branch, New Jersey [1940]	1932–1942
Sea Breeze	Pennsylvania-Reading Seashore Lines	Philadelphia, Pennsylvania–Atlantic City, New Jersey [1958]	1952–1961
Sea Clipper	Pennsylvania	New York, New York–Atlantic City, New Jersey [1940]	1937–1942
Sea Plane	Pennsylvania	New York, New York–Atlantic City, New Jersey [1940]	1937–1942
Seaboard Express	Pennsylvania, Richmond, Fredericksburg and Potomac Railroad, Seaboard Air Line Railroad	New York, New York–Jacksonville, Florida [1910]	1903–1911
Seaboard Express	Pennsylvania	New York, New York–Chicago, Illinois [1910]	1910–1935
Seaboard Fast Mail	Pennsylvania, Richmond, Fredericksburg and Potomac Railroad, Seaboard Air Line Railroad	New York, New York–Jacksonville, Florida [1910]	1901–1933
Seaboard Florida Limited	Pennsylvania, Richmond, Fredericksburg and Potomac Railroad, Seaboard Air Line Railroad	New York, New York–Miami, Florida [1930]	1903–1932
Seaboard Mail and Express	Seaboard Air Line Railroad, Louisville and Nashville Railroad	New Orleans, Louisiana–Jacksonville, Florida [1945]	1930–1931; 1937–1948
Seashore Express	Pennsylvania	Philadelphia, Pennsylvania–Harrisburg, Pennsylvania [1908]	1906–1910
Seashore Express	Southern Pacific	different California and Midwestern endpoints in different years	1915–1924
Seashore Express	New York, New Haven and Hartford Railroad	New York, New York–Providence, Rhode Island [1953]	1921; 1940; 1950–1955; 1962–1963
Seaside Special	Santa Fe	San Bernardino, California–Redlands, California [1910]	1901–1919
Sebago	Boston and Maine	Boston, Massachusetts–Portland, Maine [1952]	1952–1954
Second Empire	New York Central	New York, New York–Buffalo, New York [1907]	1906–1910
Seminole	Illinois Central Railroad, Central of Georgia Railroad, and Atlantic Coast Line	Chicago, Illinois–Jacksonville, Florida (different southern and midwestern endpoints in different years; 'Seminole Limited' before 1923) [1910]	1909–1969
Senator	Pennsylvania Railroad and New Haven Railroad; from 1971 Amtrak	Washington, DC–Boston, Massachusetts [1965]	1929–1958; 1962–1981; 1985–1998
Senator	Southern Pacific	Oakland, California–Sacramento, California	?
Seneca	New York Central	New York, New York–Buffalo, New York–Boston, Massachusetts [1930]	1929–1934; 1940–1948
Sequoia	Southern Pacific	Los Angeles, California–San Francisco, California [1930]	1928–1942
Seven O'Klocker	Central Railroad of New Jersey, Reading Company	New York, New York–Philadelphia, Pennsylvania [1941]	1935–1942
Shasta	Southern Pacific	Oakland, California–Portland, Oregon [1930]	1921–1941; 1946–1948
Shasta Daylight	Southern Pacific	Oakland, California–Portland, Oregon [1952]	1949–1967
Shasta Express	Southern Pacific	Oakland, California–Portland, Oregon [1903]	1900–1907
Shasta Limited	Southern Pacific, Union Pacific Railroad	Oakland, California–Portland, Oregon–Seattle, Washington [1911]	1910–1918
Shavano	Denver & Rio Grande Western	Salida, Colorado–Gunnison, Colorado [1938]	1937–1940
Shawnee	Illinois Central, Amtrak from 1971	Chicago, Illinois–Carbondale, Illinois [1971]	1969–1986
Shelter Island Express	Long Island Rail Road	Long Island City, New York–Greenport, New York [1940]	1901–1903; 1923–1942
Shenandoah	Baltimore & Ohio Railroad	Washington, DC–Cincinnati, Ohio (different endpoints in different years) [1960]	1937–1971
Shenandoah	Amtrak	Washington, DC–Cincinnati, Ohio [1978]	1976–1981
Shenandoah Special	Pennsylvania, Norfolk and Western Railway	New York, New York–Bristol, Virginia [1905]	1904–1909
Shinnecock Bay Express	Long Island Rail Road	Long Island City, New York–Montauk, New York [1938]	1926–1950
Shopper	New York, Susquehanna and Western Railway	New York, New York–Paterson, New Jersey [1952]	1950–1957
Shoppers Special	Pere Marquette	Chicago, Illinois–Grand Rapids, Michigan [1930]	1928–1936
Shore Line Express	Great Northern	Portland, Oregon–Vancouver, British Columbia [1915]	1911–1918
Shore Line Express	New Haven	New York, New York–Boston, Massachusetts ('Shore Line Flyer' until 1936) [1938]	1892–1921; 1931–1939
Shore Line Limited	Southern Pacific	Los Angeles, California–San Francisco, California [1911]	1906–1931
Shoreland	Chicago and North Western Railway	Chicago, Illinois–Manitowoc, Wisconsin [1936]	1936–1941
Shoreland 400	Chicago and North Western Railway	Chicago, Illinois–Green Bay, Wisconsin [1942]	1942–1968
Shoreliner	New Haven, Amtrak group of trains from 1980	New York, New York–Boston, Massachusetts [1930]	1925–1932; 1940–1952; 1980–1990
Short Line Express	Rock Island	Minneapolis-St. Paul, MN–Kansas City, Missouri [1925]	
Showman	New York, Susquehanna and Western Railway	New York, New York–Paterson, New Jersey [1952]	1950–1957
Shreveport Express	Missouri–Kansas–Texas Railroad	Dallas, Texas–Shreveport, Louisiana [1903]	1903–1910
Shreveporter	Louisiana and Arkansas, Missouri Pacific Railroad; Kansas City Southern Railway from around 1940	Hope, Arkansas–Shreveport, Louisiana [1948]	1928–1961
Silent Knight	Chicago and Eastern Illinois Railroad	Chicago, Illinois–St. Louis, Missouri [1938]	1937–1949
Silver Comet	Pennsylvania, Richmond, Fredericksburg and Potomac Railroad, Seaboard Air Line Railroad	New York, New York–Birmingham, Alabama [1947]	1947–1969
Silver Meteor	Pennsylvania, Richmond, Fredericksburg and Potomac Railroad, Seaboard Air Line Railroad; Amtrak from 1971	New York, New York–Tampa, Florida–Miami, Florida (many different endpoints over the years) [1952]	1939–present
Silver Palm	Amtrak	Miami – Tampa, Florida (1983–1984) [1983] New York, New York–Miami, Florida (1997–2001) [2000]	1983–1984; 1997–2001
Silver Star	Pennsylvania, Richmond, Fredericksburg and Potomac Railroad, Seaboard Air Line Railroad; Amtrak from 1971	New York, New York–\Miami, Florida (many different endpoints over the years) [1947]	1947–present
Silver Streak Zephyr	Chicago, Burlington & Quincy	Kansas City, Missouri–Lincoln, Nebraska [1942]	1940–1959
Silverliner Service (group of trains)		Philadelphia, Pennsylvania–Harrisburg, Pennsylvania	
Silverton	Denver & Rio Grande Western	Durango, Colorado–Silverton, Colorado [1952]	1951–1955; 1963–1966
Sinnissippi	Illinois Central	Chicago, Illinois–Fort Dodge, Iowa [1931]	1931–1948
Sioux	Milwaukee Road	Chicago, Illinois–Rapid City, South Dakota [1930]	1928–1971
Sioux City and Chicago Express	Illinois Central	Chicago, Illinois–Sioux City, Iowa [1903]	1901–1905
Sioux City-Chicago Express	Illinois Central	Chicago, Illinois–Sioux City, Iowa [1915]	1913–1918
Sioux City-Chicago Special	Chicago and North Western Railway	Chicago, Illinois–Sioux City, Iowa [1920]	1916–1927
Skipper	Boston and Maine	Bangor, Maine-Boston, Massachusetts [1956]	1951–1958
Skunk	California Western Railroad	Fort Bragg, California–Willits, California	1926–1973
Skyland Special	Southern	Asheville, North Carolina–Charlotte, North Carolina–Jacksonville, Florida [1952]	1927–1958
Sleepy Hollow	Amtrak	Albany, New York–Schenectady, New York [1984]	1984–1995
Somerset Hills Express	Lackawanna, Erie Lackawanna, Conrail, New Jersey Transit	Hoboken, New Jersey–Gladstone, New Jersey	1940s–2001
Soo Express	Soo Line and Canadian Pacific	Montreal, Quebec–Minneapolis–Saint Paul [1915]	1911–1918; 1929–1933
Soo-Dominion	Soo Line and Canadian Pacific	Minneapolis–Saint Paul, MN–Vancouver, British Columbia [1948]	1932–1960
Soo-Pacific Express	Soo Line and Canadian Pacific	Minneapolis–Saint Paul – Moose Jaw, SK [1920]	1919–1931
Sooner	Missouri–Kansas–Texas Railroad	Kansas City, Missouri–Oklahoma City, Oklahoma [1948]	1927–1951
South Atlantic Limited	Pennsylvania, Louisville and Nashville Railroad; Central of Georgia Railway	Chicago, Illinois–Jacksonville, Florida (different endpoints in different years) [1915]	1909–1915
South Shore Express	New York Central	New York, New York–Chicago, Illinois (different endpoints in different years) [1948]	1928–1960
South Shore Express	Pere Marquette	Chicago, Illinois–Grand Rapids, Michigan [1920]	1920–1927
South Shore Express	Long Island Rail Road	New York, New York–Montauk, New York [1930]	1928–1941; 1947–1949
South Wind	Florida East Coast, Pennsylvania, Louisville and Nashville and Atlantic Coast Line	Chicago, Illinois–Miami, Florida [1942]	1940–1971
Southeastern Express	Great Northern Railway, Chicago, Burlington and Quincy Railroad	Seattle, Washington–Kansas City, Missouri (aka 'Southeast Express') [1910]	1909–1929
Southeastern Limited	Frisco and connecting lines in the South	Kansas City, Missouri, various southern cities	1900–1908
Southeastern Limited	Pennsylvania, Southern	New York, New York–Jacksonville, Florida [1910]	1910–1915
Southern Belle	Kansas City Southern	Kansas City, Missouri–New Orleans, Louisiana [1942]	1940–1969
Southern Crescent	Pennsylvania, Southern; Amtrak from 1971	Boston, Massachusetts–New Orleans, Louisiana [1975]	1970–1979
Southern Express	Frisco, Southern	Kansas City, Missouri–Atlanta, Georgia [1902]	1902–1908
Southern Express	Illinois Central Railroad	Chicago, Illinois–New Orleans, Louisiana (different endpoints in different years) [1950]	1897–1918; 1922–1931; 1947–1966
Southern Express	Pennsylvania	Chicago, Illinois–Cincinnati, Ohio–Louisville, Kentucky [1910]	1905–1914
Southern Express	Pennsylvania	Erie, Pennsylvania–Washington, D.C. [1964]	c.1893-c.1900, 1914–1968
Southern Illinois Express	Chicago and Eastern Illinois Railroad	Danville, Illinois–Thebes, Illinois [1902]	1901–1906
Southern Michigan Express	Detroit and Mackinac Railway	Detroit, Michigan–Cheboygan, Michigan [1919]	1919
Southern Scenic	Missouri Pacific	Memphis, Tennessee–Kansas City, Missouri [1938]	1931–1952
Southern States Special	Pennsylvania, Richmond, Fredericksburg and Potomac Railroad, Seaboard Air Line Railroad	New York, New York–St. Petersburg, Florida [1930]	1929–1941
Southern Tier Express	Erie Railroad	New York, New York–Buffalo, New York [1925]	1911–1915; 1923–1928; 1932–1952
Southern’s Palm Limited	Pennsylvania, Southern	New York, New York–St. Augustine, Florida [1903]	1902–1910
Southerner	Pennsylvania and Southern	New York, New York–New Orleans, Louisiana [1945]	1941–1970
Southerner	Missouri Pacific and Texas and Pacific	Kansas City, Missouri–New Orleans, Louisiana (many different endpoints over the years)	1925–1963
Southland	Pennsylvania, Louisville & Nashville, Central of Georgia, Atlantic Coast Line	Chicago, Illinois–St. Petersburg, Florida and other endpoints: Sarasota, Florida and Miami, Florida [1946; 1954]	1915–1957
Southland	St. Louis-San Francisco Railway	Kansas City, Missouri–Birmingham, Alabama	1965–1967
Southwest Chief	Amtrak	Chicago, Illinois–Los Angeles, California [1986]	1984–present
Southwest Empire	New York Central and its affiliates	New York, New York–St Louis, Missouri–Cincinnati, Ohio [1910]	1909–1916
Southwest Express	Rock Island	Chicago, Illinois–Kansas City, Missouri [1943]	1943–1950
Southwest Limited	Amtrak	Chicago, Illinois–Los Angeles, California [1975]	1974–1984
Southwest Limited	Milwaukee Road	Chicago, Illinois–Milwaukee, Wisconsin–Kansas City, Missouri [1914]	1903–1958
Southwest Limited	Frisco	St. Louis, Missouri–Fort Worth, Texas [1918]	1911–1931
Southwestern Day Express	Chicago Great Western Railway	Chicago, Illinois–Kansas City, Missouri [1911]	1896–1914
Southwestern Express	New York Central and its affiliates	Boston, Massachusetts–Chicago, Illinois [1905]	1888–1891; 1900–1908; 1913–1924
Southwestern Express	Chicago Great Western Railway	Chicago, Illinois–Kansas City, Missouri [1930]	1915–1931
Southwestern Limited	Illinois Central	Meridian, Mississippi–Shreveport, Louisiana (eastbound counterpart is the Northeastern Limited) [1960]	1934–1967
Southwestern Limited	New York Central	New York, New York–St. Louis, Missouri [1952]	1889–1967
Southwestern Limited	Chicago Great Western Railway	Chicago, Illinois–Des Moines, Iowa (different endpoints in different years) [1931]	1896–1921; 1931–1932
Southwestern Mail	New York Central and its affiliates	New York, New York–St. Louis, Missouri [1925]	1910–1928
Southwestern Special	New York Central and its affiliates	New York, New York–St. Louis, Missouri–Cincinnati, Ohio [1903]	1902–1907
Speaker	Pennsylvania	New York, New York–Washington, DC [1945]	1941–1952
Special Fast Express	Boston and Albany Railroad, New Haven	New York, New York–Boston, Massachusetts [1902]	1888–1909
Speed Merchant	Boston and Maine	Boston, Massachusetts–Portland, Maine	?-1964
Spirit of California	Amtrak	Sacramento, California–Los Angeles, California [1982]	1981–1983
Spirit of St. Louis	Pennsylvania, Amtrak in 1971	New York, New York–St Louis, Missouri [1935]	1927–1971
Spokane	Union Pacific	Portland, Oregon–Spokane, Washington [1935]	1931–1964
Spokane Flyer	Union Pacific	Portland, Oregon–Spokane, Washington [1903]	1901–1909
Spokane Limited	Northern Pacific Railway	Seattle, Washington–Spokane, Washington [1922]	1921–1928
Spokane-Portland Limited	Union Pacific	Portland, Oregon–Spokane, Washington [1922]	1915–1930
Spokane-Portland Train Deluxe	Soo Line, Canadian Pacific, and connecting lines	Minneapolis–Saint Paul–Portland, Oregon [1912]	1910–1914
Sportsman	Chesapeake and Ohio Railway, Pennsylvania Railroad	Detroit, Michigan–Washington, D.C. and Phoebus, Virginia (many different endpoints over the years) [1941]	1930–1968
Sportsman	New York, Susquehanna and Western Railway	New York, New York–Paterson, New Jersey [1952]	1950–1957
Springfield Express	Boston and Albany Railroad	Boston, Massachusetts–Springfield, Massachusetts [1914]	1913–1922; 1929–1931
Spuyten Duyvil	Amtrak	New York, New York–Albany, New York [1992]	1991–1994
Standard Express	Delaware, Lackawanna and Western Railroad, Nickel Plate	New York, New York–Chicago, Illinois [1903]	1897–1905
Star	Lehigh Valley Railroad	New York, New York–Buffalo, New York [1948]	1927–1958
Star	Missouri Pacific	Fort Worth, Texas–Galveston, Texas [1926]	1926–1936
Starlight	Southern Pacific	Los Angeles, California–San Francisco, California [1953]	1950–1957
State House	Amtrak	Chicago, Illinois–St. Louis, Missouri [1980]	1974–2006
State of Maine Express	New York, New Haven & Hartford and Boston & Maine	New York, New York–Portland, Maine [1952]	1913–1960
State Special	New York Central	Cincinnati, Ohio–Cleveland, Ohio [1960]	1957–1961
Statesman	Amtrak	Boston, Massachusetts–Washington, DC [1973]	1973–1976
Statesman	Pennsylvania	Washington, DC–Pittsburgh, Pennsylvania [1935]	1931–1957
Steel City Express	Pennsylvania	Chicago, Illinois–Pittsburgh, Pennsylvania [1920]	1915–1934
Steel King	Erie Railroad (1960-1963: Erie Lackawanna), Pittsburgh and Lake Erie Railroad, Baltimore and Ohio Railroad	Pittsburgh, Pennsylvania–Cleveland, Ohio [1950]	1950–1952; 1959–1963
Steeler	Pennsylvania	Pittsburgh, Pennsylvania–Cleveland, Ohio [1948]	1948–1950
Storm King	Amtrak	New York, New York–Albany, New York [1992]	1981–1995
Streamliner	Spokane, Portland and Seattle Railway	Spokane, Washington–Portland, Oregon	−1970
Streamliner 400	Chicago and North Western Railway	Chicago, Illinois–Minneapolis–Saint Paul [1945]	1935–1946; 1951–1968
Sun Queen	Pennsylvania, Richmond, Fredericksburg and Potomac Railroad, Seaboard Air Line Railroad	New York, New York–St. Petersburg, Florida–Miami, Florida [1945]	1941–1947
Sunbeam	Texas and New Orleans (subsidiary of Southern Pacific)	Houston, Texas–Dallas, Texas [1948]	1925–1955
Sunchaser	Illinois Central, Central of Georgia, Florida East Coast Railway	Chicago, Illinois and St. Louis, Missouri–Miami, Florida [1948]	1941–1949
Sunday Special	Duluth, South Shore and Atlantic Railway	Mackinaw City, Michigan–Soo Junction, Michigan [1906]	1905–1913
Sundown	New Haven	New York, New York–Boston, Massachusetts [1948]	1942–1952; 1959–1968
Sundown	Amtrak	Boston, Massachusetts–Washington, DC [1973]	1973–1977
Sunflower	Missouri Pacific	St. Louis, Missouri–Wichita, Kansas [1928]	1924–1954
Sunland	Richmond, Fredericksburg & Potomac, Seaboard Air Line, New Haven Railroad, Pennsylvania Railroad	Boston, Massachusetts–Fort Myers, Florida (many different endpoints over the years) [1948]	1948–1968
Sunnyland (train)	Frisco and Southern	Memphis, Tennessee–Pensacola, Florida–Atlanta, Georgia (many different endpoints over the years) [1948]	1925–1964
Sunrise Special	Long Island Rail Road	New York, New York–Montauk, New York [1936]	1922–1942
Sunset	Detroit and Mackinac Railway	Detroit, Michigan–Alpena, Michigan [1940]	1936–1949
Sunset Limited	Southern Pacific, from 1971 Amtrak	Los Angeles, California–New Orleans, Louisiana (some years have different endpoints) [1948]	1894–present
Sunset Mail	Southern Pacific	New Orleans, Louisiana–Houston, Texas–Dallas, Texas [1930]	1923–1935
Sunshine Special	Missouri Pacific and Texas and Pacific	St. Louis, Missouri–San Antonio, Texas (some years have different endpoints) [1918]	1915–1960
Suntan Special	Southern Pacific	San Francisco, California–Santa Cruz, California	?
Super Chief	Santa Fe, from1971 Amtrak	Chicago, Illinois–Los Angeles, California [1948]	1936–1974
Super Skunk	California Western Railroad	Fort Bragg, California–Willits, California [1970]	1967–1973
Susquehanna	Amtrak	New York, New York–Harrisburg, Pennsylvania [1985]	1982–1994
Susquehannock	Pennsylvania	Philadelphia, Pennsylvania–Williamsport, Pennsylvania [1935]	1938–1960
Suwanee River Special	Southern, Seaboard Air Line, Cleveland, Cincinnati, Chicago and St. Louis Railway	St. Petersburg, Florida - various Midwestern cities, Chicago, Illinois, Detroit, Michigan and Cleveland, Ohio [1926]	1923–1930
Sycamore	Cleveland, Cincinnati, Chicago and St. Louis Railway	Chicago, Illinois–Cincinnati, Ohio [1948]	1923–1957, 1959–1966

== T ==
Train Name	Railroad	Train Endpoints in a typical [year]	Operated
Taconic	New Haven	New York, New York–Pittsfield, Massachusetts [1955]	1954–1958
Tamiami	Pennsylvania, Richmond, Fredericksburg and Potomac Railroad, Atlantic Coast Line Railroad, Florida East Coast Railway	New York, New York–Miami, Florida–Tampa, Florida [1935]	1930–1940
Tamiami Champion	Pennsylvania, Richmond, Fredericksburg and Potomac Railroad, Atlantic Coast Line Railroad, Florida East Coast Railway	New York, New York–Miami, Florida–Tampa, Florida [1942]	1941–1943
Tampa Special	Atlantic Coast Line Railroad	Jacksonville, Florida–Tampa, Florida (with through cars to New York, Chicago, and many other cities) [1930]	1918; 1923–1941
Tar Heel	Pennsylvania, Richmond, Fredericksburg and Potomac Railroad, Atlantic Coast Line Railroad	New York, New York and additional branch from Norfolk, Virginia–Wilmington, North Carolina [1932]	1927–1937
Techachapi	Southern Pacific	Los Angeles, California–San Francisco, California [1928]	1921–1942
Tennessean	Missouri Pacific	St. Louis, Missouri–Memphis, Tennessee[1930]	1927–1948
Tennessean	Southern, Pennsylvania Railroad, Norfolk and Western, Nashville, Chattanooga & St. Louis	New York, New York–Memphis, Tennessee, and NCStL branch from Chattanooga to Nashville [1948, 1954]	1941–1968
Texan	Missouri Pacific, Texas and Pacific Railway	St. Louis, Missouri–Fort Worth, Texas–Houston, Texas [1952]	1928–1960
Texan	Frisco	Chicago, Illinois–Galveston, Texas [1916]	1911–1921
Texan	Santa Fe	Chicago, Illinois–Los Angeles, California–Houston, Texas–Oakland, California [1948]	1915–1918; 1931; 1936–1954
Texas and California Express	Texas and Pacific Railway	Texarkana, Texas–El Paso, Texas (with through cars between St. Louis and Los Angeles) [1908]	1905–1910
Texas Chief	Santa Fe; Amtrak; (from 1971)	Chicago, Illinois–Galveston, Texas [1948]	1948–1974
Texas Eagle	Missouri Pacific	St. Louis, Missouri–Galveston, Texas–St. Louis, Missouri–San Antonio, Texas–St. Louis, Missouri–El Paso, Texas (different years had different endpoints, with some years New York and Los Angeles on other railroads) [1948]	1948–1971
Texas Eagle	Amtrak	Chicago, Illinois–Houston, Texas (through to Los Angeles in later years via San Antonio) (1989)	1989–present
Texas Express	Santa Fe	Chicago, Illinois–Galveston, Texas (different endpoints in different years) [1930]	1911–1934
Texas Express	Katy	St. Louis, Missouri–San Antonio, Texas [1903]	1903–1910
Texas Express	Kansas City Southern Railway	Kansas City, Missouri–Port Arthur, Texas [1930]	1925–1932
Texas Flyer	Santa Fe	Chicago, Illinois–Galveston, Texas [1918]	1910–1927
Texas Limited	Katy	St. Louis, Missouri–Galveston, Texas [1936]	1898–1931; 1936–1937
Texas Limited	Southern Pacific	New Orleans, Louisiana–San Antonio, Texas (with through cars to Chicago) [1930]	1923–1934
Texas Limited	Santa Fe	Denver, Colorado–Galveston, Texas (different endpoints in different years) [1920]	1906–1925
Texas Ranger	Texas and Pacific Railway, Missouri Pacific Railroad	St. Louis, Missouri–El Paso, Texas [1930]	1923–1946
Texas Rocket	Rock Island	Kansas City, Missouri–Dallas, Texas [1948]	1937–1955
Texas Special	Katy–Frisco	St. Louis, Missouri–Houston, Texas [1952]	1915–1965
Texas Triangle	Missouri Pacific	Houston, Texas–Fort Worth, Texas (with through cars to other destinations) [1945]	1936–1947
Texas Zephyr	Chicago, Burlington & Quincy	Denver, Colorado–Houston, Texas [1948]	1940–1967
Texas-Colorado Limited	Texas and Pacific Railway	New Orleans, Louisiana–Fort Worth, Texas [1915]	1913–1918; 1923–1927; 1936–1946
Texas, Kansas City and Chicago Express	Rock Island	Chicago, Illinois–Dallas, Texas [1920]	1919–1924
Tex-Mex Express	Texas Mexican Railway	Corpus Christi, Texas–Laredo, Texas	?
Thoroughbred	Monon Railroad	Chicago, Illinois–Louisville, Kentucky [1950]	1948;1967
Three Rivers	Amtrak	New York, New York–Chicago, Illinois [1999]	1995;2005
Through Mail	Illinois Central Railroad	Chicago, Illinois–New Orleans, Louisiana [1915]	1915–1921
Tidewater	Seaboard Air Line Railroad	Jacksonville, Florida–Portsmouth, Virginia [1955]	1954–1968
Tidewater	Amtrak	New York, New York–Richmond, Virginia [1981]	1981–1988
Timberliner	New York Central	Detroit, Michigan–Mackinaw City, Michigan [1955]	1951–1962
Times Square	Amtrak	New York, New York–Washington, DC [1996]	1981–1982; 1995–1998
Tippecanoe	Monon Railroad	Chicago, Illinois-Indianapolis, Indiana [1948]	1924–1940; 1947–1958
Tiresaver	Florida East Coast Railway	Jacksonville, Florida–Miami, Florida [1945]	1942–1946
Toledo and Chicago Express	Lake Shore and Michigan Southern Railway	Chicago, Illinois–Toledo, Ohio [1903]	1903–1909
Toledo - Detroit Express	New York Central	Detroit, Michigan–Toledo, Ohio [1945]	1922–1928; 1942–1951
Toledo - Detroit Limited	Cleveland, Cincinnati, Chicago and St. Louis Railway	Cincinnati, Ohio–Indianapolis, Indiana–Detroit, Michigan [1920]	1917–1926
Toledo - Detroit Special	Cleveland, Cincinnati, Chicago and St. Louis Railway	Detroit, Michigan–Indianapolis, Indiana [1920]	1917–1924; 1929–1932
Tom Taber Express	Lackawanna, Erie Lackawanna, Conrail, New Jersey Transit	Hoboken, New Jersey–Dover, New Jersey	1940s–1996
Tomahawk	Milwaukee Road	Chicago, Illinois–Woodruff, Wisconsin [1952]	1931–1964
Tonopah Express	Southern Pacific	San Francisco, California–Goldfield, Nevada [1922]	1919–1927
Toronto	Lehigh Valley Railroad, Canadian National Railway	New York, New York–Toronto, Ontario [1933]	1931–1936
Toronto Limited	New York Central, Toronto, Hamilton and Buffalo Railway, Canadian Pacific Railway	New York, New York–Toronto, Ontario (with through cars to other destinations) [1930]	1925–1931
Toronto-Buffalo Express	New York Central, Toronto, Hamilton and Buffalo Railway, Canadian Pacific Railway	New York, New York–Toronto, Ontario (1952]	1943–1963
Torpedo	Ann Arbor	Frankfort, Michigan–Toledo, Ohio	?
Tourist Flyer	Santa Fe	San Francisco, California–Chicago, Illinois [1915]	1911–1916
Trail Blazer	Pennsylvania	Chicago, Illinois–New York, New York [1940]	1939–1959
Trans-Atlantic Limited	New York Central	Chicago, Illinois–New York, New York [1925]	1924–1927; 1933–1941
Traveler	Milwaukee Road	Chicago, Illinois–Milwaukee, Wisconsin [1945]	1943–1968
Travelers’ Special	Illinois Central Railroad	Memphis, Tennessee–Jackson, Mississippi [1930]	1927–1933
Treasure Island Special	Union Pacific, Chicago and North Western	Chicago, Illinois–San Francisco, California [1940]	1939–1940
Tri-City Special	New York Central	Cleveland, Ohio–Detroit, Michigan [1933]	1929–1935
Tri-State Limited	Chicago Great Western Railway	Minneapolis–Saint Paul–Kansas City, Missouri [1930]	1927–1933
Trojan	Boston and Maine	Boston, Massachusetts–Troy, New York [1952]	1952–1956
Troy Special	New York Central	New York, New York–Troy, New York [1922]	1891; 1896–1909; 1919–1932
Tulsan	Santa Fe	Chicago, Illinois–Tulsa, Oklahoma [1952]	1939–1971
Turbo (family of trains)	USDOT, New Haven Railroad, Penn Central, Amtrak	New York, New York–Boston, Massachusetts	1968–
Turboliner (family of trains)	Amtrak	New York, New York–upstate New York (various endpoints); Chicago, Illinois–Milwaukee, Wisconsin; Chicago, Illinois–Detroit, Michigan	1970s–1995 mid-1970s–early 1980s
Tuscarora	New York Central	New York, New York–Buffalo, New York [1948]	1938–1958
Tuxedo	Erie Railroad	New York, New York–Port Jervis, New York [1940]	1931–1960
Twentieth Century Limited	New York Central	New York, New York–Chicago, Illinois [1948]	1902–1967
Twenty-Four-Hour New Yorker	Pennsylvania	New York, New York–St. Louis, Missouri [1909]	1909–1913
Twenty-Four-Hour St. Louis	Pennsylvania	New York, New York–St. Louis, Missouri [1909]	1909–1913
Twilight	Lackawanna	Hoboken, New Jersey–Buffalo, New York [1963]	1950–1965
Twilight Express	Boston and Albany Railroad, New York, New Haven and Hartford	New York, New York–Boston, Massachusetts [1940]	1918–1938
Twilight Limited	New York Central	Chicago, Illinois–Detroit, Michigan [1935]	1927–1971
Twilight Limited	Amtrak	Chicago, Illinois–Detroit, Michigan [1978]	1976–2004
Twilight Limited	Chicago & North Western Railway	Minneapolis–Saint Paul–Duluth, Minnesota [1908]	1906–1915; 1919–1930
Twilight Shoreliner	Amtrak	Boston, Massachusetts–Newport News, Virginia [2000]	1997–2003
Twin Cities 400	Chicago and North Western Railway	Chicago, Illinois–Minneapolis, Minnesota–St Paul, Minnesota [1944]	1935–1963
Twin Cities Hiawatha	Milwaukee Road (Amtrak in 1977)	Chicago, Illinois–St Paul, Minnesota [1956]	1935–1971; 1977
Twin Cities Special	Milwaukee Road	Chicago, Illinois–Minneapolis, Minnesota–St Paul, Minnesota [1925]	1921–1928
Twin Cities-Chicago Express	Rock Island	Chicago, Illinois–Minneapolis, Minnesota–St Paul, Minnesota [1925]	1921–1936
Twin Cities-St. Louis Special	Rock Island	Minneapolis–Saint Paul–St. Louis, Missouri [1920]	1919–1928; 1932–1933
Twin Cities, Chicago, Milwaukee Limited	Soo Line	Chicago, Illinois–Minneapolis, Minnesota–St Paul, Minnesota [1912]	1911–1916
Twin City Express	Rock Island	Chicago, Illinois–Minneapolis, Minnesota–St Paul, Minnesota [1905]	1903–1910
Twin City Express	Northern Pacific Railway	Minneapolis–Saint Paul–Portland, Oregon [1903]	1902–1905; 1910–1914
Twin City Express	Chicago Great Western Railway	Minneapolis–Saint Paul–Kansas City, Missouri [1930]	1910–1932; 1948–1949
Twin City Limited	Chicago Great Western Railway	Minneapolis–Saint Paul–Omaha, Nebraska [1948]	1896–1907; 1912–1952
Twin City Limited	Chicago, Burlington and Quincy Railroad	Minneapolis–Saint Paul–St. Louis, Missouri [1916]	1915–1918; 1936–1940
Twin City Special	Chicago Great Western Railway	Minneapolis–Saint Paul–Kansas City, Missouri [1903]	1896–1914
Twin City-Chicago Limited	Minneapolis and St. Louis Railway	Chicago, Illinois–Minneapolis, Minnesota–St Paul, Minnesota [1915]	1913–1918
Twin City-Omaha Limited	Chicago and North Western Railway	Minneapolis–Saint Paul–Omaha, Nebraska [1915]	1910–1918
Twin City-Twin Ports Express	Northern Pacific Railway	Minneapolis–Saint Paul–Duluth, Minnesota [1930]	1921–1966
Twin Star Rocket	Rock Island, Chicago, Burlington and Quincy Railroad	Minneapolis, Minnesota–Houston, Texas [1948]	1945–1967

== U, V ==
Train Name	Railroad	Train Endpoints in a typical [year]	Operated
Umpachanee	New Haven	New York, New York–Pittsfield, Massachusetts [1955]	1955–1960
Union	Pennsylvania	Chicago, Illinois–Cincinnati, Ohio & Louisville, Kentucky branch via Indianapolis, Indiana [1950]; continuing cars to Norfolk [1959]	1933–1960
United States Fast Mail	Pennsylvania, Southern Railway	New York, New York–New Orleans, Louisiana [1918]	1893–1919; 1923–1932
Upstate Special	New York Central	New York, New York–Utica, New York [1952]	1925–1931; 1935–1957
Utah and California Express	Denver and Rio Grande Western Railroad	Denver, Colorado–Ogden, Utah [1906]	1900; 1906–1910
Utah Express	Union Pacific	Salt Lake City, Utah–Boise, Idaho [1930]	1911–1913; 1919–1931; 1936–1946
Utah Parks Special	Union Pacific	Salt Lake City, Utah–Cedar City, Utah [1930]	1927–1932; 1954–1960
Utahn	Union Pacific	Los Angeles, California–Cheyenne, Wyoming [1947]	1947–1951
Ute	Colorado Midland Railway	Denver, Colorado–Grand Junction, Colorado (with through cars to California) [1903]	1900–1908
Vacationer	Pennsylvania, Richmond, Fredericksburg and Potomac Railroad, Atlantic Coast Line Railroad, Florida East Coast Railway	New York, New York–Miami, Florida [1940]	1938–1942; 1946–1955
Valley	Chicago and North Western Railway	Chicago, Illinois–Green Bay, Wisconsin [1936]	1936–1941
Valley 400	Chicago and North Western Railway	Chicago, Illinois–Green Bay, Wisconsin [1945]	1942–1968
Valley Eagle	Missouri Pacific	Brownsville, Texas–Corpus Christi, Texas–Houston, Texas [1948]	1948–1962
Valley Express	New York Central	Chicago, Illinois–Detroit, Michigan [1947]	1943–1948
Valley Express	Southern Pacific	San Francisco, California–Los Angeles, California [1910]	1907–1917
Valley Express	New Haven, Boston and Maine, Central Vermont Railway	New York, New York–White River Junction, Vermont [1948]	1948–1957
Valley Flyer	Santa Fe	Oakland, California–Bakersfield, California	1939–1942
Valley Flyer	Southern Pacific	Oakland, California–Fresno, California [1921]	1921–1927
Valley Forge	Amtrak	New York, New York–Harrisburg, Pennsylvania [1989]	1971–1990
Valley Special	Pennsylvania	Chicago, Illinois–Pittsburgh, Pennsylvania [1948]	1936–1940; 1947–1949
Valpo Local	Pennsylvania Railroad, Penn Central, Conrail, Amtrak	Chicago, Illinois–Valparaiso, Indiana	1869–1991
Varsity	Chicago, Milwaukee, St. Paul and Pacific Railroad	Chicago, Illinois–Madison, Wisconsin [1935]	1929–1971
Varsity	Chicago, Indianapolis & Louisville	Chicago, Illinois–Bloomington, Indiana [1950]	1950–1953
Vermonter	Central Vermont Railway	St. Albans, Vermont–White River Junction, Vermont (other endpoints with other railroads in other years) [1948]	1940–1965
Vermonter	Amtrak	Washington, DC–St. Albans, Vermont [1998]	1995–present
Verrazano	Amtrak	New York, New York–Washington, DC [1984]	1982–1990
Vestibuled Limited	Erie Railroad	New York, New York–Chicago, Illinois [1911]	1892–1915
Victory	Chicago and North Western Railway	Chicago, Illinois–Minneapolis, Minnesota–St Paul, Minnesota [1938]	1931–1955
Viking	Chicago & North Western Railway	Chicago, Illinois–Minneapolis, Minnesota–St Paul, Minnesota [1938]	1923–1955
Virginian	Amtrak	New York, New York–Richmond, Virginia [1985]	1984–1994; 1997–1998
Volunteer	Nashville, Chattanooga and St. Louis Railway	Nashville, Tennessee–Memphis, Tennessee [1932]	1932–1934

== W ==
Train Name	Railroad	Train Endpoints in a typical [year]	Operated
Wabash Cannonball	Wabash Railroad; Norfolk and Western Railway from 1964	Detroit, Michigan–St. Louis, Missouri [1962]	1948–1971
Wachusett	Boston and Maine	Boston, Massachusetts–Greenfield, Massachusetts [1954]	1952–1956
Wall Street	Amtrak	New York, New York–Washington, DC [1997]	1991; 1997–1998
Wall Street	Reading and Jersey Central	Philadelphia, Pennsylvania–Jersey City, New Jersey (called 'Wall Street Special' before 1948) [1950]	1935–1942; 1948–1968; 1973–1980
Wall Street Special	Long Island Rail Road	New York, New York–Montauk, New York [1965]	1963–1966
Washington and Florida Limited	Pennsylvania, Southern Railway	New York, New York–Jacksonville, Florida [1905]	1903–1908
Washington and New York Express	Pennsylvania	New York, New York–Washington, DC (with through cars to other points at different times) [1930]	1885–1905; 1909–1936; 1940–1946
Washington and Philadelphia Express	Pennsylvania	Washington, DC–Philadelphia, Pennsylvania–Buffalo, New York [1930]	1910–1951
Washington Day Express	Pennsylvania	Washington, DC–Buffalo, New York [1908]	1906–1914
Washington Executive	Amtrak	New York, New York–Washington, DC [1984]	1984–1986
Washington Express	Pennsylvania	Washington, DC–Buffalo, New York (The Pennsylvania Railroad has several trains with this name with different destinations) [1951]	1877–1891; 1900–1906; 1910–1913; 1918–1927; 1951–1958
Washington Express	Baltimore and Ohio Railroad	Philadelphia, Pennsylvania–Washington, DC [1945]	1942–1948
Washington Irving	Amtrak	New York, New York–Albany, New York [1978]	1975–1980; 1991–1993
Washington Night Express	Reading, Jersey Central, Baltimore and Ohio Railroad	Jersey City, New Jersey–Washington, DC [1952]	1947–1952
Washington-Atlanta	Southern Railway	Washington, DC–Atlanta, Georgia [1964]	1954-c.1965
Washington-Atlanta-New Orleans Express	Pennsylvania, Southern Railway	New York, New York–New Orleans, Louisiana [1950]	1929; 1936–1938; 1942–1943; 1950–1954
Washington-Chattanooga-New Orleans Limited	Pennsylvania, Southern Railway	New York, New York–New Orleans, Louisiana [1924]	1917–1932
Washington–Chicago Express	Baltimore and Ohio Railroad	Washington, DC–Chicago, Illinois [1960]	1935–1936; 1960–1967
Washington-Cleveland Night Express	Baltimore and Ohio Railroad	Washington, DC–Cleveland, Ohio [1945]	1942–1946
Washington-Detroit Limited	Baltimore and Ohio Railroad	Detroit, Michigan–Baltimore, Maryland [1930]	1928–1930
Washington-Philadelphia Express	Pennsylvania, Richmond, Fredericksburg and Potomac Railroad	Philadelphia, Pennsylvania–Richmond, Virginia [1937]	1931–1940
Washington-Pittsburgh Express	Baltimore and Ohio Railroad	Baltimore, Maryland–Pittsburgh, Pennsylvania [1938]	1935–1941
Washington-Pittsburgh-Chicago Express	Baltimore and Ohio Railroad	Washington, DC–Chicago, Illinois [1950]	1945–1959
Washington-Richmond Limited	Pennsylvania, Richmond, Fredericksburg and Potomac Railroad	New York, New York–Richmond, Virginia [1911]	1911–1918
Washingtonian	Amtrak	Montreal, Quebec–New York, New York [1972]	1972–1974
Washingtonian	Boston and Maine Railroad, New Haven, Pennsylvania Railroad, Canadian National Railway, Central Vermont Railway	Montreal, Quebec–Washington, DC [1948]	1924–1966
Washingtonian	Baltimore and Ohio Railroad, Pittsburgh and Lake Erie Railroad	Baltimore, Maryland–Cleveland, Ohio [1948]	1942–c.1956
Washingtonian	Baltimore and Ohio Railroad	Philadelphia, Pennsylvania–Washington, DC [1945]	1914–1927; 1933–1956
Washingtonian	Great Northern Railway	Seattle, Washington–Portland, Oregon [1920]	1919–1924
Water Level Express	Amtrak	New York, New York–Buffalo, New York [1975]	1974–1977; 1989–1998
Water Level Limited	New York Central	New York, New York–Boston, Massachusetts–Chicago, Illinois [1936]	1936–1949
Waterloo-Des Moines Express	Chicago Great Western Railway	Chicago, Illinois–Waterloo, Iowa [1917]	1914–1924
Weekender	Maine Central Railroad Company, Boston and Maine	Boston, Massachusetts–Bangor, Maine [1954]	1953–1958
Weekender	Long Island Rail Road	New York, New York–Montauk, New York [1963]	1963–1964
West Coast	Southern Pacific	San Francisco, California–Seattle, Washington (different endpoints in different years) [1948]	1928–1960
West Coast Champion	Pennsylvania, Richmond, Fredericksburg and Potomac Railroad, Atlantic Coast Line Railroad	New York, New York–St. Petersburg, Florida [1953]	1949–1967
West Shore Day Express	West Shore Railroad	New York, New York–Albany, New York [1924]	1917; 1923–1928
West Shore Express	West Shore Railroad	Chicago, Illinois–Albany, New York [1916]	1894–1918; 1928–1930
West Virginia Night Express	Baltimore and Ohio Railroad	Chicago, Illinois–Wheeling, West Virginia [1948]	1929–1959
West Virginian	Amtrak	Washington, DC–Parkersburg, West Virginia [1971]	1971;1972
West Virginian	Baltimore & Ohio	Parkersburg, West Virginia–Chicago, Illinois [1948]	1915–1916; 1929–1962
West Virginian	Chesapeake and Ohio Railway	Washington, DC–Richmond, Virginia–Cincinnati, Ohio [1925]	1923–1931
Western Express	New York Central	Chicago, Illinois–Detroit, Michigan (many different endpoints over the years; in latter years westbound-only through train from Montreal to Chicago) [1943]	1894–1946
Western Express	Pennsylvania	New York, New York–Chicago, Illinois (many different endpoints over the years) [1920]	1878–1932
Western Express	Toledo, St. Louis and Western Railroad	Toledo, Ohio–St. Louis, Missouri [1903]	1902–1908
Western Express	Rock Island	Little Rock, Arkansas–Oklahoma City, Oklahoma (many different endpoints over the years) [1916]	1906–1923
Western Express	Southern Pacific, Chicago, Burlington and Quincy Railroad, Denver and Rio Grande Western Railroad	Chicago, Illinois–St. Louis, Missouri–San Francisco, California [1908]	1907–1914
Western Express	Delaware, Lackawanna and Western Railroad, New York, Chicago and St. Louis Railroad	New York, New York–Chicago, Illinois [1924]	1921–1926
Western Mail	Rock Island	Memphis, Tennessee–Oklahoma City, Oklahoma [1906]	1906–1909; 1919–1924
Western New York Express	New York Central	New York, New York–Buffalo, New York [1910]	1906–1925
Western Special	Delaware, Lackawanna and Western Railroad, New York, Chicago and St. Louis Railroad	Chicago, Illinois–Chicago, Illinois [1930]	1928–1938
Western Star	Great Northern	Chicago, Illinois–Seattle, Washington–Portland, Oregon [1951]	1951–1971
Westerner	New York Central and its affiliates	New York, New York–Chicago, Illinois–Cincinnati, Ohio (endpoints varied over the years) [1915]	1913–1931; 1957
Westerner	Texas and Pacific Railway	Dallas, Texas–El Paso, Texas (in some years though cars to California) [1952]	1949–1963
Westerner	Missouri Pacific, Atchison, Topeka and Santa Fe Railway	St. Louis, Missouri–Los Angeles, California [1930]	1925–1934
Westerner	Lackawanna Railroad, Nickel Plate Road	Chicago, Illinois–Hoboken, New Jersey [1948]	1939–1961
Wheeling Night Express	Baltimore and Ohio Railroad	Chicago, Illinois–Wheeling, West Virginia [1918]	1917–1922; 1928
Wheeling-Baltimore Express	Baltimore and Ohio Railroad	Baltimore, Maryland–Wheeling, West Virginia [1922]	1913–1931
Wheeling-Chicago Night Express	Baltimore and Ohio Railroad	Chicago, Illinois–Wheeling, West Virginia [1925]	1923–1927; 1960
Whippoorwill	Chicago and Eastern Illinois Railroad	Chicago, Illinois–Evansville, Indiana [1948]	1946–1949
White City Special	Cleveland, Cincinnati, Chicago and St. Louis Railway	Chicago, Illinois–Cincinnati, Ohio [1930]	1897–1948
Whitelight Limited	Delaware, Lackawanna and Western Railroad	New York, New York–Buffalo, New York [1930]	1927–1935
Wilkes-Barre Express	Lehigh Valley Railroad, Reading	New York, New York–Philadelphia, Pennsylvania–Wilkes-Barre, Pennsylvania [1905]	1904–1909; 1915–1938
Wilkes-Barre Night Express	Lehigh Valley Railroad, Reading	New York, New York–Philadelphia, Pennsylvania–Wilkes-Barre, Pennsylvania [1912]	1909–1931
Will Rogers	St. Louis–San Francisco Railway	St. Louis, Missouri–Oklahoma City, Oklahoma [1948]	1937–1965
Willamette Valley	Amtrak	Portland, Oregon–Eugene, Oregon [1980]	1980–1982
William Penn	Baltimore and Ohio Railroad	New York, New York–Chicago, Illinois [1938]	1931–1938
William Penn	Pennsylvania, New Haven	Boston, Massachusetts–Pittsburgh, Pennsylvania [1949]	1940–1962
William Penn	Amtrak	New York, New York–Philadelphia, Pennsylvania [1980]	1980–1981; 1995
Williamsport and Philadelphia Express	Pennsylvania	Philadelphia, Pennsylvania–Williamsport, Pennsylvania [1915]	1904–1920
Williamsport Express	Pennsylvania	Philadelphia, Pennsylvania–Williamsport, Pennsylvania [1935]	1893–1910; 1919–1921; 1934–1938
Williamsporter	Central Railroad of New Jersey	Jersey City, New Jersey–Williamsport, Pennsylvania [1935]	1931–1944
Winnebago	Chicago and North Western Railway	Chicago, Illinois–Green Bay, Wisconsin [1940]	1936–1941
Winnipeg Express	Minneapolis, St. Paul and Sault Ste. Marie and Canadian Pacific	Minneapolis-St. Paul, Minnesota–Winnipeg, Manitoba [1925]	1909–1928
Winnipeg Limited	Great Northern	Minneapolis-St. Paul, Minnesota–Winnipeg, Manitoba [1948]	1906–1971
Winnipeger	Minneapolis, St. Paul and Sault Ste. Marie and Canadian Pacific (1928–1960); Soo Line and Canadian Pacific (1961–1967)	Minneapolis-St. Paul, Minnesota–Winnipeg, Manitoba [1935]	1928–1967
Winnipesaukee	Boston and Maine, New Haven	New York, New York–Concord, New Hampshire [1950]	1948–1954
Winona	Cleveland, Cincinnati, Chicago and St. Louis Railway	Indianapolis, Indiana–South Bend, Indiana [1933]	1932–1936
Winter Haven-Ft. Myers Special	Atlantic Coast Line Railroad	Jacksonville, Florida–Fort Myers, Florida [1926]	1925–1928; 1933–1941
Wisconsin Lakes Special	Chicago and North Western Railway	Chicago, Illinois–Watersmeet, Michigan [1952]	1932–1936; 1940; 1950–1955; 1963
Wolverine	New York Central	Chicago, Illinois–Detroit, Michigan–New York, New York [1948]	1906–1967
Wolverine (in later years group of trains)	Amtrak	Chicago, Illinois–Pontiac, Michigan [2004]	1971–present
Wyoming Valley Express	Lehigh Valley Railroad	New York, New York–Wilkes-Barre, Pennsylvania (many different endpoints over the years) [1905]	1902–1905; 1912–1924; 1935–1938

== X, Y, & Z ==
Train Name	Railroad	Train Endpoints in a typical [year]	Operated
Xplorer	New York Central	Cleveland, Ohio–Cincinnati, Ohio	1956–1957
Yampa Valley	Denver and Rio Grande Western Railroad	Denver, Colorado–Craig, Colorado (called 'Yampa Valley Mail' before 1958 [1960]	1955–1968
Yankee	Boston and Albany Railroad, New York, New Haven and Hartford	New York, New York–Boston, Massachusetts [1920]	1919–1924
Yankee Clipper	New Haven Railroad; Amtrak from 1971	New York, New York–Boston, Massachusetts	1930–1976; 1980–1998
Yankton and Minneapolis and St. Paul Night Express	Great Northern	Minneapolis–Saint Paul–Yankton, South Dakota [1927]	1925–1929
Yankton and Minneapolis Night Express	Great Northern	Minneapolis–Saint Paul–Yankton, South Dakota [1933]	1930–1940
Yellowstone Comet	Chicago, Burlington & Quincy, Northern Pacific Railway	Chicago, Illinois–Gardiner, Montana (called 'Yellowstone Park Comet until 1930) [1930]	1926–1932
Yellowstone Express	Union Pacific Railroad, Wabash Railroad	St. Louis, Missouri–West Yellowstone, Montana [1930]	1922–1942
Yellowstone Special	Union Pacific Railroad	Salt Lake City, Utah–West Yellowstone, Montana [1915]	1914–1917; 1921–1934; 1947–1960
Yuletide Special	Baltimore & Ohio Railroad	Washington, D.C.–Chicago, Illinois [1964]	1964
Zenith Special	Great Northern	Minneapolis–Saint Paul–Duluth, Minnesota [1921]	1919–1924
Zephyr 9902	Chicago, Burlington & Quincy	Chicago, Illinois–Hannibal, Missouri [1950]	1949–1953
Zephyr Rocket	Chicago, Burlington & Quincy and Rock Island	St. Louis, Missouri–Minneapolis, Minnesota [1945]	1941–1963
Zephyrette	Western Pacific	Salt Lake City, Utah–Oakland, California [1953]	1950–1960
Zipper	Chicago & Eastern Illinois	Chicago, Illinois–St. Louis, Missouri [1940]	1931; 1937–1946
