= Western Express =

Western Express may refer to:

- The Western Express, an American radio show
- Western Express Highway, in Mumbai, India
- Western Express Air, an American airline
- Western Express, Inc., an American truckload carrier
- Western Express, several named passenger trains of the United States
