= Parlor car =

Rail vehicle to carry passengers in luxury

A parlor car (or parlour car outside the U.S.) is a type of passenger coach that provides superior comforts and amenities compared to a standard coach.

== History ==
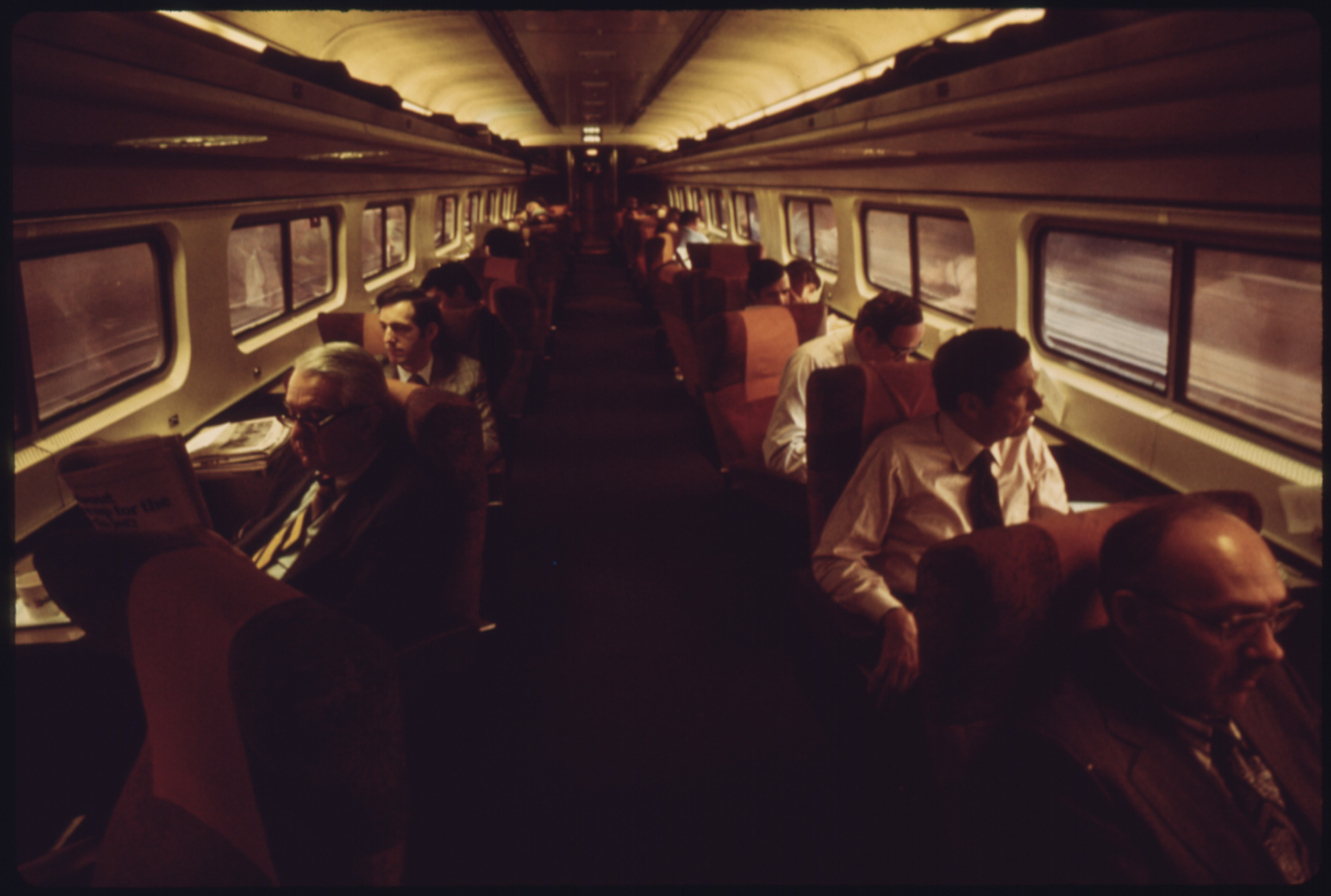
Club seating aboard the Metroliner in the 1970s.

Parlor cars came about on United States railroads to address the absence of separate class accommodations. In the United Kingdom and Europe, passenger trains carried first-, second- and third-class coaches, with the first-class coaches offering the best seating and costing the most. In contrast, American trains offered a flat rate and standard accommodations. For 19th-century writers this represented a difference between class-bound Europe and the democratic United States.

Parlor accommodations were appreciated by those who used them because of their exclusivity. H. L. Mencken called the parlor car "the best investment open to an American":

He not only has a certain seat of his own, free from intrusion and reasonably roomy; he also rides in a car in which all of the people are clean and do not smell badly. The stinks in a day-coach, even under the best of circumstances, are revolting. The imbecile conversation that goes on in parlor-car smoke-rooms is sometimes hard to bear, but there is escape from it in one's seat; the gabble in day-coaches is worse, and it is often accompanied by all sorts of other noises.

Most parlor cars were found on daytime trains in the Northeast United States. In comparison to a standard coach, parlor cars offered more comfortable seating and surroundings, as well as food and beverages, but were far inferior to sleeping cars for overnight trips. Southern Pacific operated the all-parlor car Shore Line Limited on a 13.5-hour daytime schedule between Los Angeles and San Francisco, California, from March 1, 1906, until the Great Depression ended the service on September 15, 1931.

== Today ==
=== United States ===
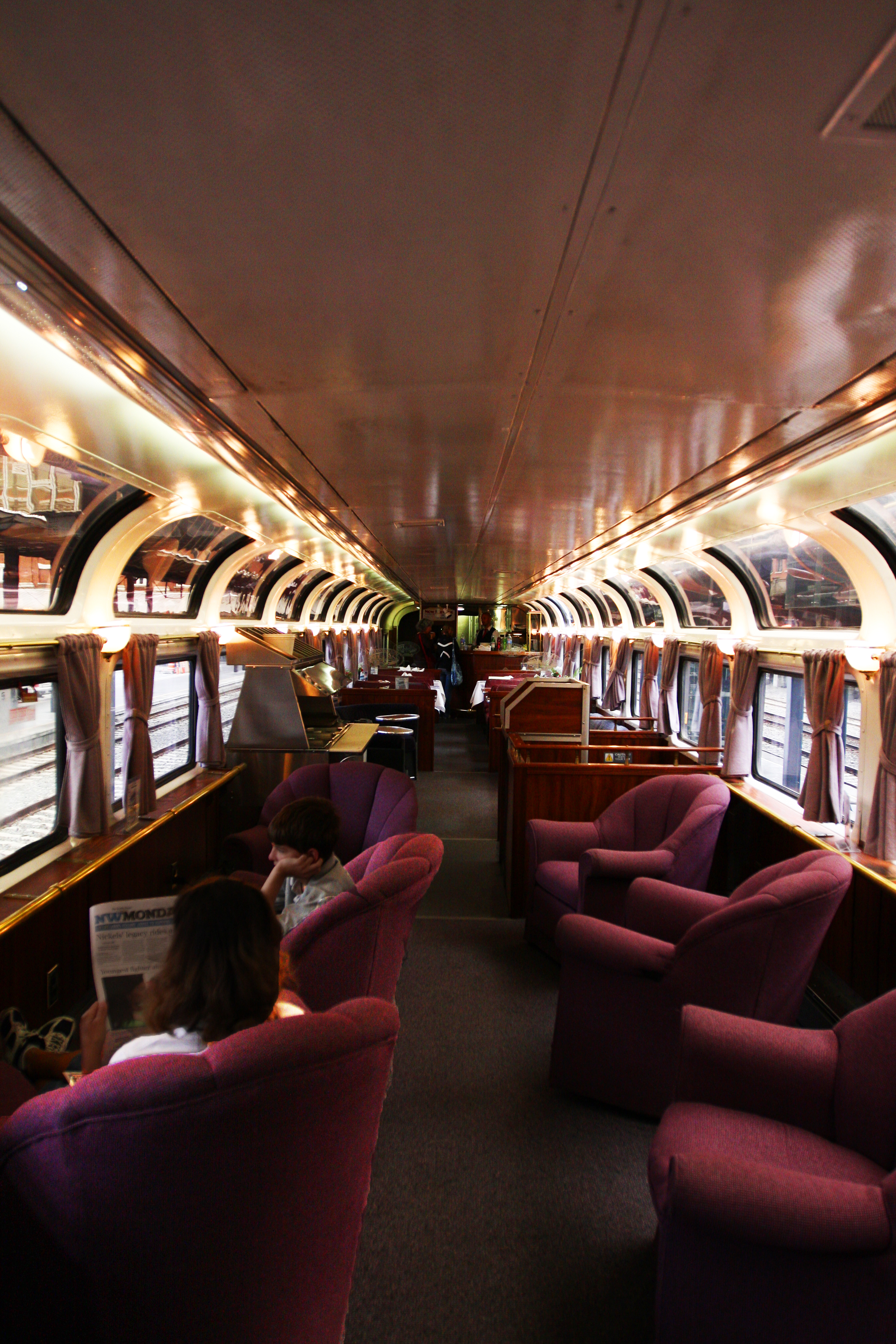
The interior of a Pacific Parlour Car.

Elevated service survives on Amtrak although the term "parlor car" has fallen into disuse. One recently discontinued example was the Pacific Parlour Car on the Coast Starlight, converted Hi-Level lounges which featured a mixture of 1x1 swivel-chair seating and cafe-style seating. In contrast to past usage, this car was provided as a lounge exclusively for sleeping car passengers and was not itself bookable. Amtrak discontinued the Pacific Parlour in February 2018. The Acela offers First Class service, including at-seat service and improved seating. Other Amtrak trains offer a Business Class, which includes roomier seating and, on some routes, a complimentary beverage and newspaper.
