= Shoshone (train) =

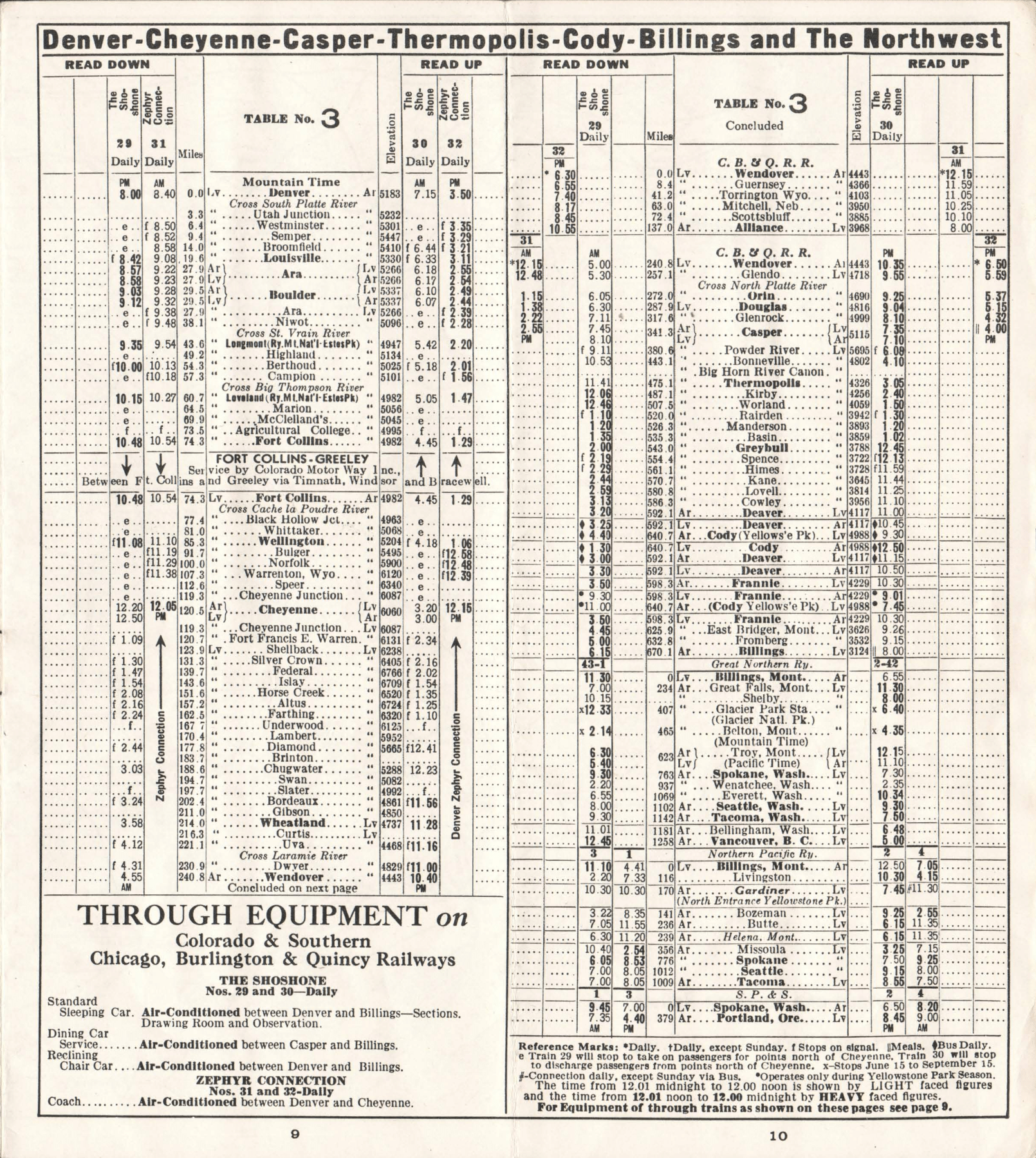
- 1946 Colorado and Southern Railway Timetable

Overview
- Status: Discontinued
- Locale: Western United States
- Last service: September 1st, 1967
- Former operators: "CB&Q", "C&S"

Route
- Termini: Denver, Colorado; Billings, Montana
- Distance travelled: 667 Miles
- Service frequency: Daily
- Train number: 29/30

The Shoshone was a named passenger train of the Chicago, Burlington and Quincy Railroad and its subsidiary the Colorado and Southern Railway. The train operated between Denver, Colorado and Billings, Montana via Casper, Wyoming and the Wind River Canyon. The train operated until September 1, 1967. In 1946 the train featured standard heavyweight sleeping car accommodation, dining car service, and reclining chair cars. By 1967 the name was dropped and the train consisted of only a modernized heavyweight coach and storage mail cars which were picked up and dropped off en route.
