= Tomahawk (train) =

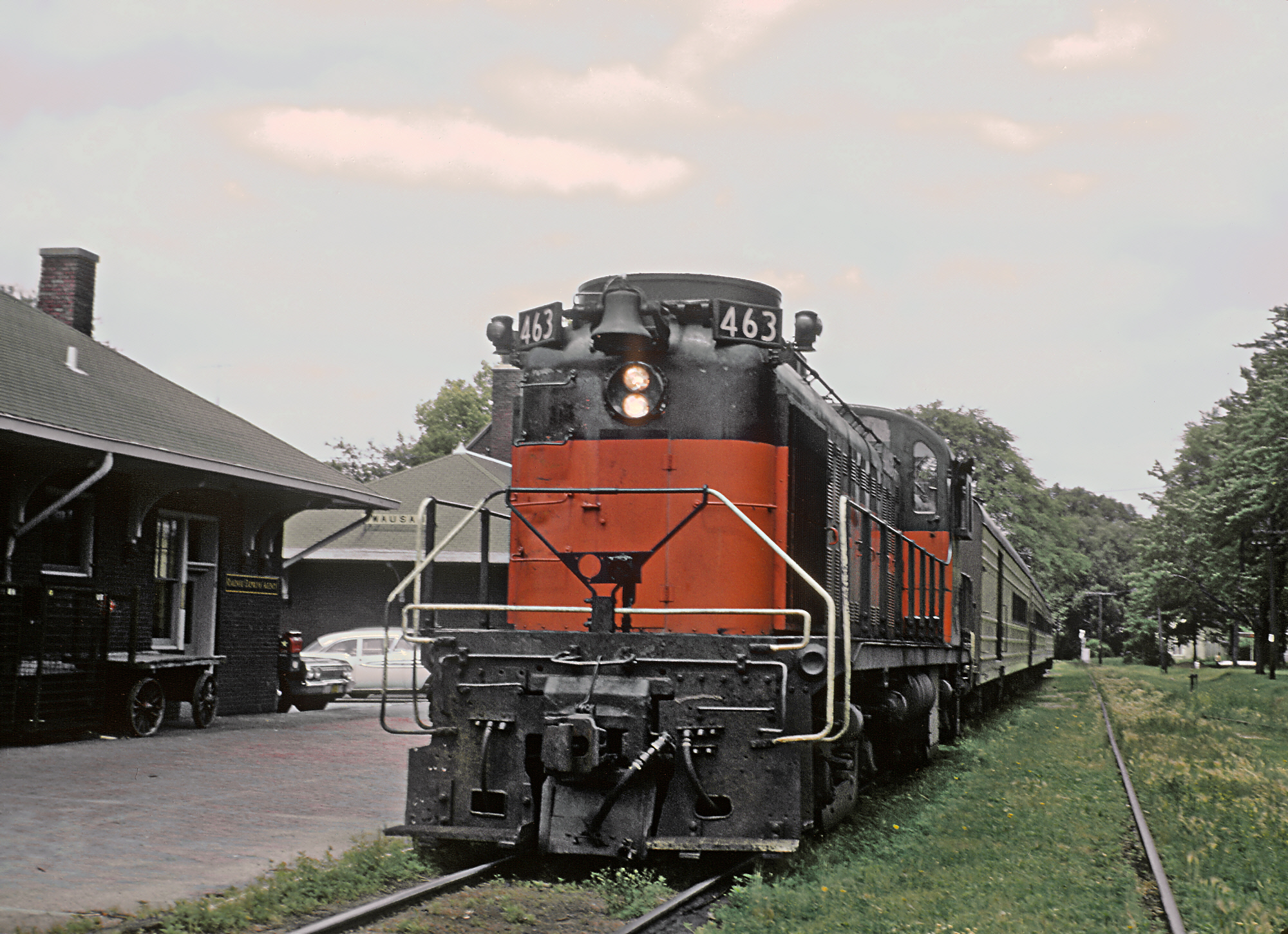
- A Milwaukee Road passenger train at Wausau, Wisconsin in 1967

Overview
- Former operator: Milwaukee Road

Route
- Termini: Chicago, Illinois; Woodruff, Wisconsin
- Service frequency: Daily

The Tomahawk was a passenger train operated by the Chicago, Milwaukee, St. Paul and Pacific Railroad ("Milwaukee Road") between Chicago and Woodruff, Wisconsin. It began prior to 1940 between Chicago and Minocqua, Wisconsin. By 1955, it would be extended to Woodruff before having the terminus cut back to Wausau, Wisconsin by 1958. Service was eliminated by 1968.
