= Shore Line Limited =

Overview
- Service type: Inter-city rail
- Status: Discontinued
- Locale: California
- First service: March 1, 1906
- Last service: September 15, 1931
- Former operator: Southern Pacific Railroad

Route
- Termini: San Francisco, California; Los Angeles, California
- Average journey time: 13½ hours
- Service frequency: daily
- Line used: Coast Line

Technical
- Track gauge: 4 ft 8 1/2 in (1,435 mm)

The Shore Line Limited was a named passenger train of the Southern Pacific Railroad. It operated on a 13.5-hour daytime schedule between Los Angeles and San Francisco, California via the Coast Line.

== History ==
The train was introduced on March 1, 1906, consisting entirely of first-class parlor cars, a rarity on the United States' west coast. Initially, the service only called at six stations, though more were added in later years. Trains headed toward San Francisco had helper engines added in San Luis Obispo to maintain speeds over the Cuesta Pass. Less than two months after beginning operation, the train was temporarily discontinued due to the 1906 San Francisco earthquake — service resumed just over a month later. Originally given numbers 19 and 20, the services had been re-designated as numbers 77 and 78 by 1914. Storms in late January 1914 damaged large portions of the Coast Line, with train delays lasting several days. As a result, Shore Line Limited runs were canceled and would not be restored until June 1915. The train was discontinued on September 15, 1931, canceled due to effects of the Great Depression.

=== Wrecks ===
The northbound Shore Line Limited wrecked about ten miles (16 km) north of King City on September 28, 1919, killing the engineer and fireman. An additional 41 passengers received minor injuries.

On September 22, 1922, the southbound Shore Line Limited, having departed twenty minutes late from Montalvo, crashed into a northbound Oxnard–Santa Paula local train; the engineer of the Limited and fireman of the local were killed in the collision with the rest of the crew and passengers sustaining minor injuries.

Six cars of the southbound Limited wrecked near Los Angeles when it sideswiped a freight train which had been put into a siding but left jutting into the inbound tracks on April 6, 1924. No passengers or crew were injured.
