= Southerner (U.S. train) =

Former named American passenger train

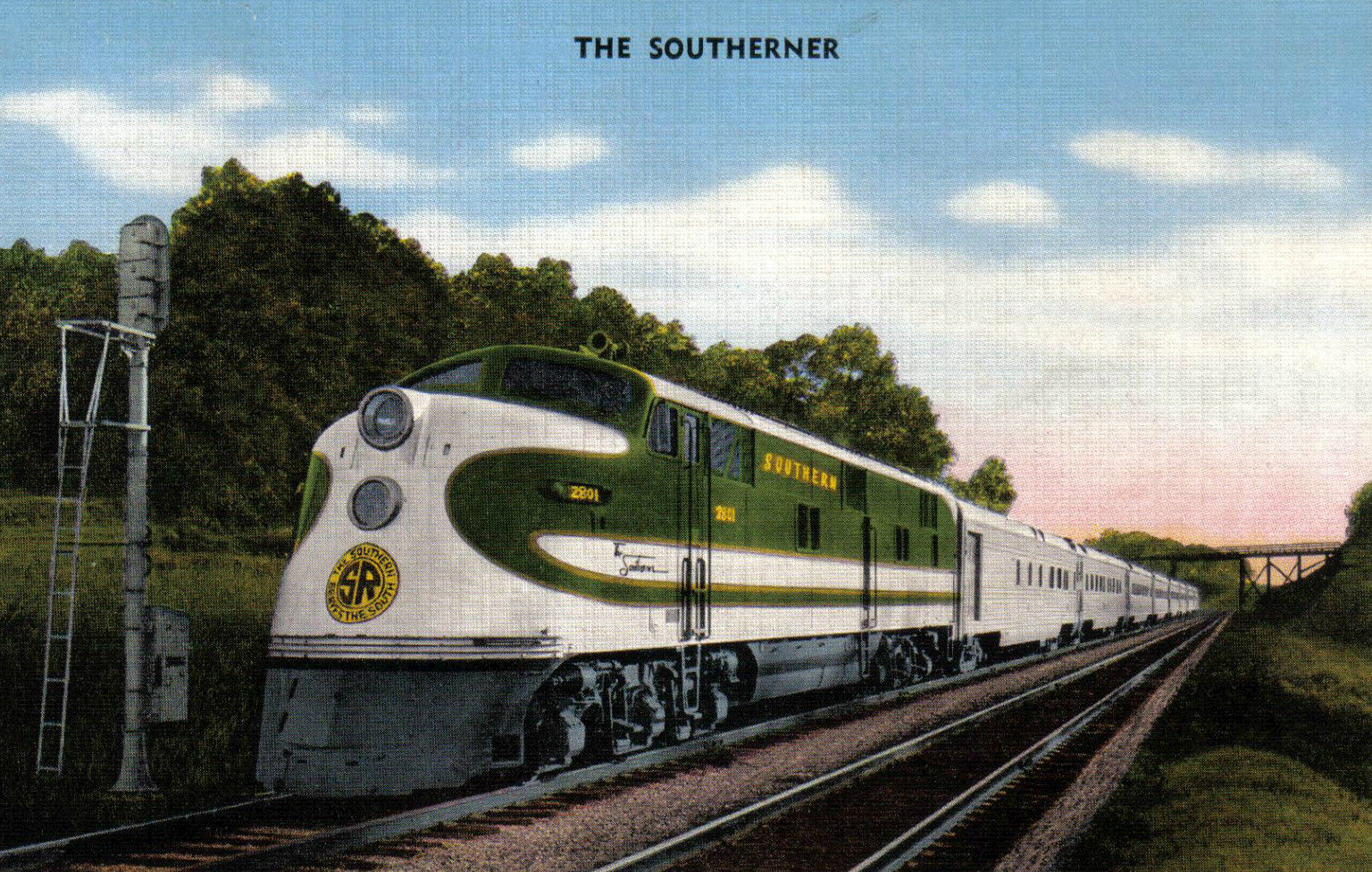
- Postcard depiction of the train.

Overview
- Service type: Inter-city rail
- Status: Operating
- Locale: Northeastern United States/Southeastern United States
- First service: March 31, 1941
- Last service: 1970
- Former operator: Southern Railway

Route
- Termini: New Orleans, Louisiana; New York City
- Distance travelled: 1,377 miles (2,216 km)
- Service frequency: Daily
- Train numbers: 47 southbound, 48 northbound

On-board services
- Seating arrangements: Reclining seat coaches
- Sleeping arrangements: A single sleeping car of roomettes and double bedrooms (1952)
- Catering facilities: Dining car
- Observation facilities: Tavern-lounge car

The Southerner was a streamlined passenger train operated by the Southern Railway in the United States between New York City and New Orleans via Charlotte, Atlanta, Birmingham, and Meridian. It operated from 1941 to 1970.

== History ==
The Southerner was one of two new streamliners put into operation by the Southern Railway in 1941, the other being the Tennessean. The new train made its first run on March 31, 1941, using new equipment delivered by Pullman-Standard. The Pennsylvania Railroad handled the train between New York and Washington, D.C.

The Southerner shared much of the same route as the Crescent, the Southern's other major New York-New Orleans sleeper, but diverged between Atlanta and New Orleans. While the Crescent took a more direct route via Montgomery and Mobile, Alabama, the Southerner stayed inland to serve Birmingham and Meridian. The Southerner also traveled exclusively on Southern trackage south of Washington, while the Crescent used Atlanta and West Point Railroad, Western Railway of Alabama and Louisville and Nashville Railroad trackage south of Atlanta.

In 1970, the Southern Railway combined the Crescent with the Southerner to form the Southern Crescent. The merged train moved to the Birmingham–Meridian route, allowing the train to run solely on Southern's right-of-way between New Orleans and Washington. This train became Amtrak's Crescent on February 1, 1979.

== Equipment ==
Pullman-Standard built three consists in 1941 for the new Southerner streamliner. Each consist included the following: baggage-dormitory-coach (22 seats), 52-seat coach (partitioned because of segregationist policies in the Southern United States), 56-seat coach, a dining car, two more 56-seat coaches, and a tavern-lounge-observation car. The front half of the observation car contained a tavern area with booths and tables. A bar area with a small buffet followed, then a rounded-off observation area. The Pennsylvania Railroad owned three of the 56-seat coaches. Motive power south of Washington, D.C. was provided by an EMD E6 diesel locomotive.
