= Missouri Pacific Railroad Depot =

Missouri Pacific Railroad Depot may refer to any of following former and active train stations previously used by the Missouri Pacific Railroad, many of which are listed on the U.S. National Register of Historic Places (NRHP):

(by state then city)

- Missouri-Pacific Depot-Altus, Altus, AR, listed on the NRHP in Arkansas
- Missouri-Pacific Railroad Depot-Arkadelphia, Arkadelphia, AR, listed on the NRHP in Arkansas
- Missouri-Pacific Depot-Atkins, Atkins, AR, listed on the NRHP in Arkansas
- Missouri Pacific Depot (Bald Knob, Arkansas), listed on the NRHP in Arkansas
- Missouri Pacific Railroad Depot-Camden, Camden, AR, listed on the NRHP in Arkansas
- Missouri-Pacific Depot-Clarksville, Clarksville, AR, listed on the NRHP in Arkansas
- Missouri Pacific Depot (Earle, Arkansas), listed on the NRHP in Arkansas
- Missouri-Pacific Railroad Depot-Gurdon, Gurdon, AR, listed on the NRHP in Arkansas
- Missouri-Pacific Railroad Depot-Hope, Hope, AR, listed on the NRHP in Arkansas
- Missouri-Pacific Railroad Depot-Hot Springs, Hot Springs, AR, listed on the NRHP in Arkansas
- Missouri-Pacific Railroad Depot-Malvern, Malvern, AR, listed on the NRHP in Arkansas
- Missouri Pacific Railroad Depot-McGehee, McGehee, AR, listed on the NRHP in Arkansas
- Missouri-Pacific Depot-Newport, Newport, AR, listed on the NRHP in Arkansas
- Missouri-Pacific Depot-Ozark, Ozark, AR, listed on the NRHP in Arkansas
- Missouri Pacific Depot (Prescott, Arkansas), listed on the NRHP in Arkansas
- Missouri-Pacific Depot-Russellville, Russellville, AR, listed on the NRHP in Arkansas
- Missouri Pacific Railroad Depot (Sylamore, Arkansas), listed on the NRHP in Arkansas
- Missouri-Pacific Depot-Walnut Ridge, Walnut Ridge, AR, listed on the NRHP in Arkansas
- Missouri Pacific Depot (Charleston, Missouri), listed on the NRHP in Missouri
- Missouri Pacific Depot at Independence also known as Truman Depot, in Independence, Missouri, listed on the NRHP in Missouri
