= Poplar Bluff station =

Train station in Poplar Bluff, Missouri, USA

Poplar Bluff, MO
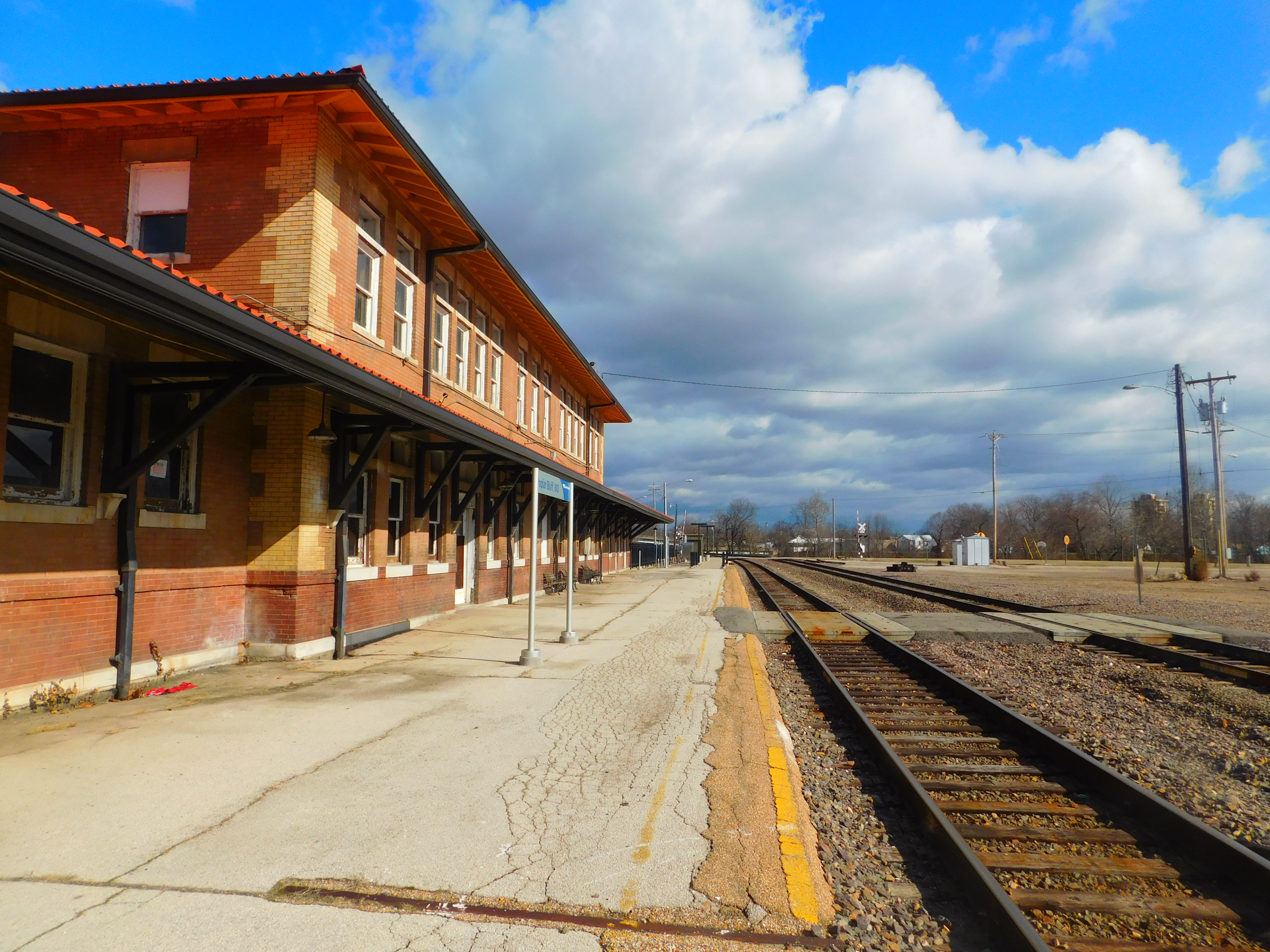
- Poplar Bluff station in January 2017

General information
- Location: 400 South Main Street; Poplar Bluff, Missouri; United States
- Owner: Poplar Bluff Historic Depot Restoration Corporation
- Line: Union Pacific Railroad
- Platforms: 1 side platform
- Tracks: 2

Other information
- Station code: Amtrak: PBF

History
- Opened: 1910

Passengers
- FY 2025: 5,263 (Amtrak)

Services
Preceding station	Amtrak	Following station
Walnut Ridge toward Los Angeles or San Antonio	Texas Eagle	Arcadia Valley toward Chicago
Former services
Preceding station	Amtrak	Following station
Walnut Ridge toward Laredo or Houston	Inter-American	St. Louis toward Chicago
Preceding station	Missouri Pacific Railroad	Following station
Neelyville toward Texarkana	Texarkana – St. Louis	Hendrickson toward St. Louis
Terminus	Poplar Bluff – Charleston	Junland toward Charleston
- St. Louis, Iron Mountain and Southern Railroad Depot
- U.S. National Register of Historic Places
- Interactive map of St. Louis, Iron Mountain and Southern Railroad Depot
- Location: 400 S. Main St., Poplar Bluff, Missouri
- Coordinates: 36°45′13″N 90°23′36″W
- Area: less than one acre
- Built: 1910
- Built by: St. Louis, Iron Mountain and Southern Railway
- Architectural style: Bungalow/craftsman
- MPS: Poplar Bluff MPS
- NRHP reference No.: 94001397
- Added to NRHP: December 1, 1994
Location

Poplar Bluff station is a historic train station in Poplar Bluff, Missouri, United States, served by Amtrak, the national railroad passenger system.

== History ==
The station was built in 1910 by the St. Louis, Iron Mountain and Southern Railway. When the line and railroad was bought by the Missouri Pacific Railroad in 1917, the station was renamed the Missouri Pacific Depot, and when the line was bought by the Union Pacific Railroad in 1982, the station was renamed the Union Pacific Depot in 1983, despite the fact that it was already used by Amtrak. It was added to the National Register of Historic Places in 1994.

In 2003, Union Pacific donated the building to the committee to Save and Restore the Historic Train Depot, a citizens-led non-profit that has since reorganized as the Poplar Bluff Historic Depot Restoration Corporation. The group has worked to raise money to restore the depot to include the exterior and interior.

== See also ==
- List of Amtrak stations
