= Little Rock Union Station =

Train station in Little Rock, Arkansas

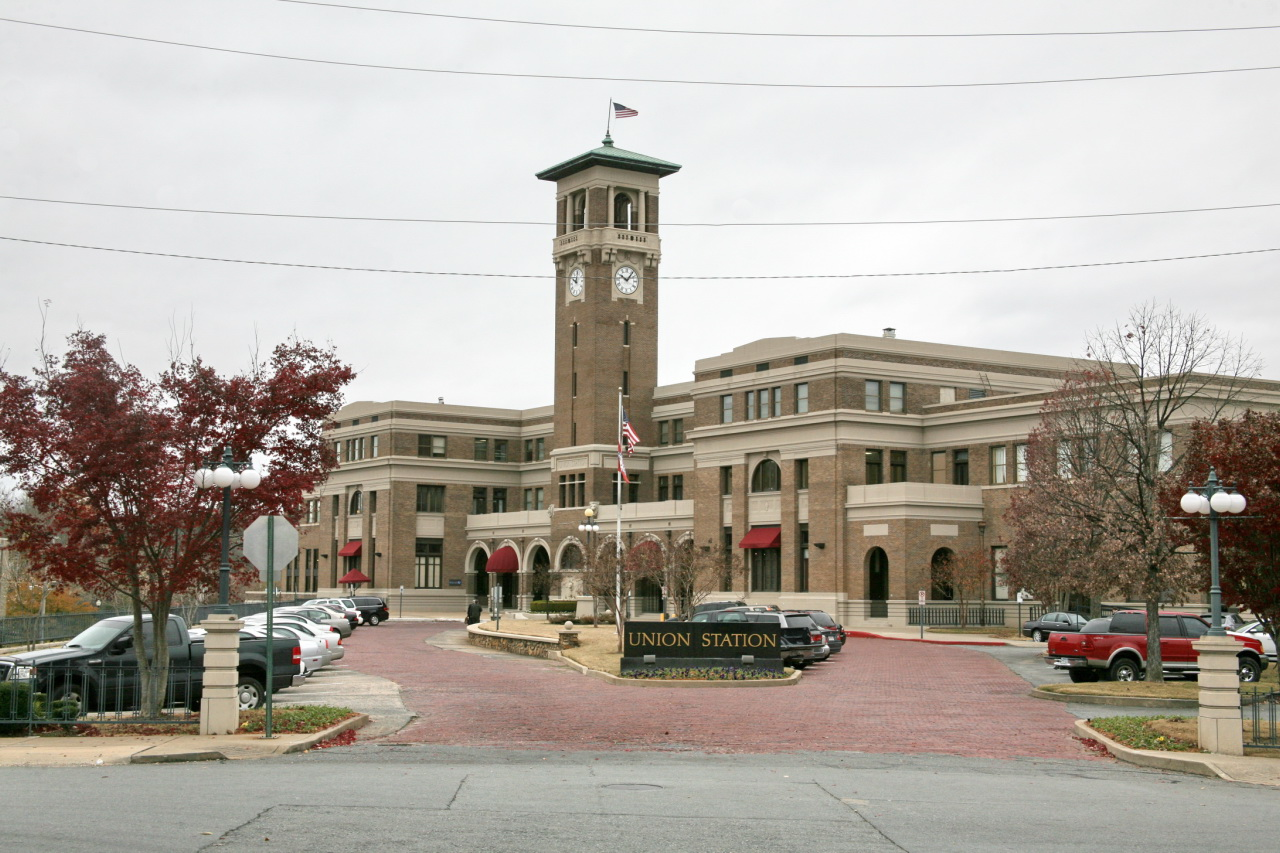

General information
- Location: 1400 West Markham Street; Little Rock, Arkansas; United States
- Coordinates: 34°45′02″N 92°17′13″W
- Owner: BSR Trust, LLC
- Line: Union Pacific Railroad
- Platforms: 1 side platform
- Tracks: 1 passing siding and 2 through tracks
- Bus operators: Rock Region Metro

Construction
- Parking: 20 long term and 20 short term dedicated parking spaces
- Accessible: Yes

Other information
- Station code: Amtrak: LRK

History
- Opened: 1921

Passengers
- FY 2025: 25,432 (Amtrak)

Services
Preceding station	Amtrak	Following station
Malvern toward Los Angeles or San Antonio	Texas Eagle	Walnut Ridge toward Chicago
Former services
Preceding station	Amtrak	Following station
Malvern toward Laredo or Houston	Inter-American	Newport toward Chicago
Preceding station	Missouri Pacific Railroad	Following station
Benton toward Texarkana	Texarkana – St. Louis	North Little Rock toward St. Louis
Conway toward Wichita	Little Rock – Wichita	Terminus
Terminus	Little Rock – New Orleans	Sweet Home toward New Orleans
- MoPac Station
- U.S. National Register of Historic Places
- Built: 1911
- Architect: E. M. Tucker/MoPac
- NRHP reference No.: 77000270
- Added to NRHP: June 17, 1977
Location

Little Rock Union Station, also known as Mopac Station, is a train station in Little Rock, Arkansas, United States served by Amtrak, the national railroad passenger system.

== History ==
The present Little Rock station opened August 1, 1921, having been constructed by the Missouri Pacific Railroad after a fire destroyed the prior station on April 7, 1920. Architect E. M. Tucker of St. Louis designed the building, keeping the 1907 Renaissance Revival-style characteristics and changing the roof from gabled to flat. The Stewart Construction Company of St. Louis built the new station at a cost of $1.25 million. The structure used existing foundations, some exterior walls and the clock tower of the previous station, which had survived the fire. The station is listed on the National Register of Historic Places as "Mopac Station".

Although known as Union Station, this particular structure was used by only a single railroad, Missouri Pacific. Prior structures on this site were served by two additional railroads, Memphis and Little Rock Railroad (1874–1893) and St. Louis Southwestern Railway (known as the 'Cotton Belt') (ca. 1892–1910). The present (1921) structure was predated by a large wooden structure erected in 1874, and a brick station that opened in 1909 and burned in 1920.

The main entrance to Union Station was located on the Markham Street level, and waiting rooms, ticket office and a restaurant were located on this level. The upper two floors housed the railroad's train dispatchers and offices of the freight and passenger departments, American Refrigerator Transit Company, and the Pullman Company, which staffed the sleeping and dining cars of passenger trains. The basement (track level) held extensive mail and Railway Express Agency facilities, a baggage room, and a small dining car commissary. Passenger access to the tracks was via an open air midway extending from the north side of the building, with stairways and three umbrella sheds extending in each direction at track level. This midway structure was original to the 1908 station, having survived the 1920 fire.

Little Rock was the junction point for Missouri Pacific trains bound northeast to St. Louis Union Station, and east for Memphis Union Station. Trains went westbound to Dallas, Ft. Worth and El Paso; San Antonio and Galveston via Houston. Through trains from St. Louis to Hot Springs were also available. These trains included the following:

- Southerner (St. Louis and Memphis to El Paso, San Antonio and Houston)
- Sunshine Special (St. Louis and Memphis to Mexico City via San Antonio)
- Texas Eagle (St. Louis and Memphis to El Paso, and Mexico City via San Antonio)

=== Decline ===
Missouri Pacific passenger service to Little Rock ended just after midnight on May 1, 1971 when Amtrak assumed Missouri Pacific passenger operations. The remaining umbrella sheds and midway were dismantled in October 1973, less than six months before Amtrak began a new passenger route through Little Rock. Amtrak continued to use the original waiting room and ticket office area until July 1992. The waiting area and ticket offices were relocated to a newly renovated area of the station located at track level.

== Connections ==
Rock Region Metro provides transit service around Little Rock. While there is no direct connection to the station, Route 1 provides bus service two blocks to the south of the station, although this route does not operate when Amtrak is scheduled to arrive at the station.

== See also ==
- List of Amtrak stations
- National Register of Historic Places listings in Little Rock, Arkansas
