= Austin station (Texas) =

Train station just west of downtown Austin, Texas

Austin, TX
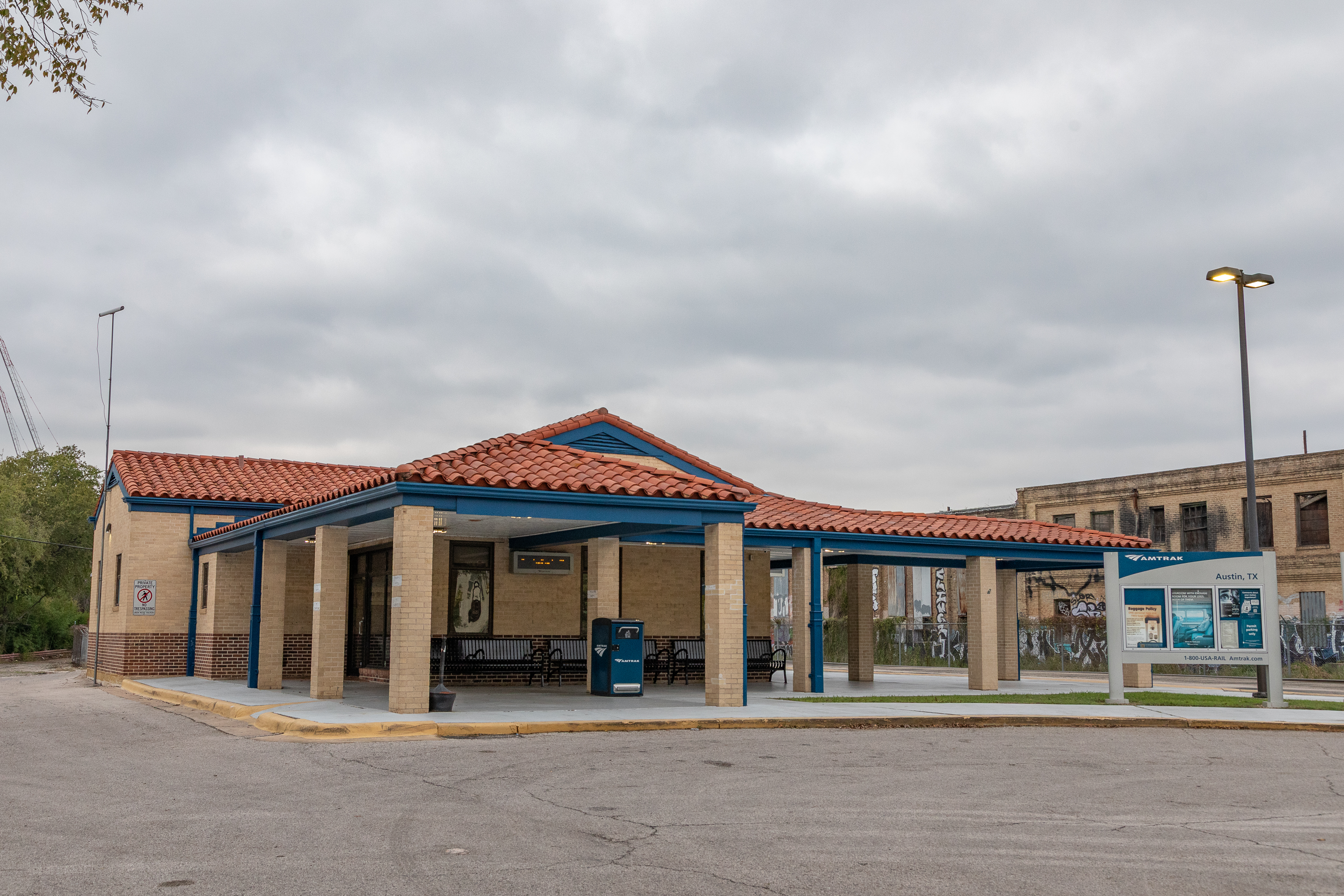
- Austin station in December 2025

General information
- Location: 250 North Lamar Boulevard; Austin, Texas; United States
- Coordinates: 30°16′11″N 97°45′25″W
- Owner: Union Pacific Railroad
- Platforms: 1 side platform
- Tracks: 1 passing siding + 1 main line
- Connections: CapMetro: 3, 484, CapMetro Rapid 803 at Seaholm station Ann & Roy Butler Hike-and-Bike Trail

Construction
- Parking: 50 long term spaces
- Accessible: Yes

Other information
- Station code: Amtrak: AUS

History
- Opened: 1947
- Original company: Missouri Pacific Railroad

Passengers
- FY 2025: 47,030 (Amtrak)

Services
| Preceding station | Amtrak | Following station |
|---|---|---|
| San Marcos toward Los Angeles or San Antonio | Texas Eagle | Taylor toward Chicago |
Former services
| Preceding station | Amtrak | Following station |
|---|---|---|
| San Marcos toward Laredo | Inter-American | Taylor toward Chicago |
| Preceding station | Missouri Pacific Railroad | Following station |
| Manchaca toward Laredo | Laredo – Palestine | McNeil toward Palestine |
Location
- Location within Texas Location within the United States

Austin station is a train station located just west of downtown Austin, Texas, United States. The station is served by Amtrak's Texas Eagle route, which runs north to Chicago and west to Los Angeles. Trains pass daily at 9 am and 5 pm.

== History ==
The brick depot was built in 1947 for the Missouri Pacific Railroad and provides a small waiting room, ticket office and restroom for passengers.
