= Arcadia Valley station =

Passenger rail station in Arcadia, Missouri, United States

Arcadia Valley, MO
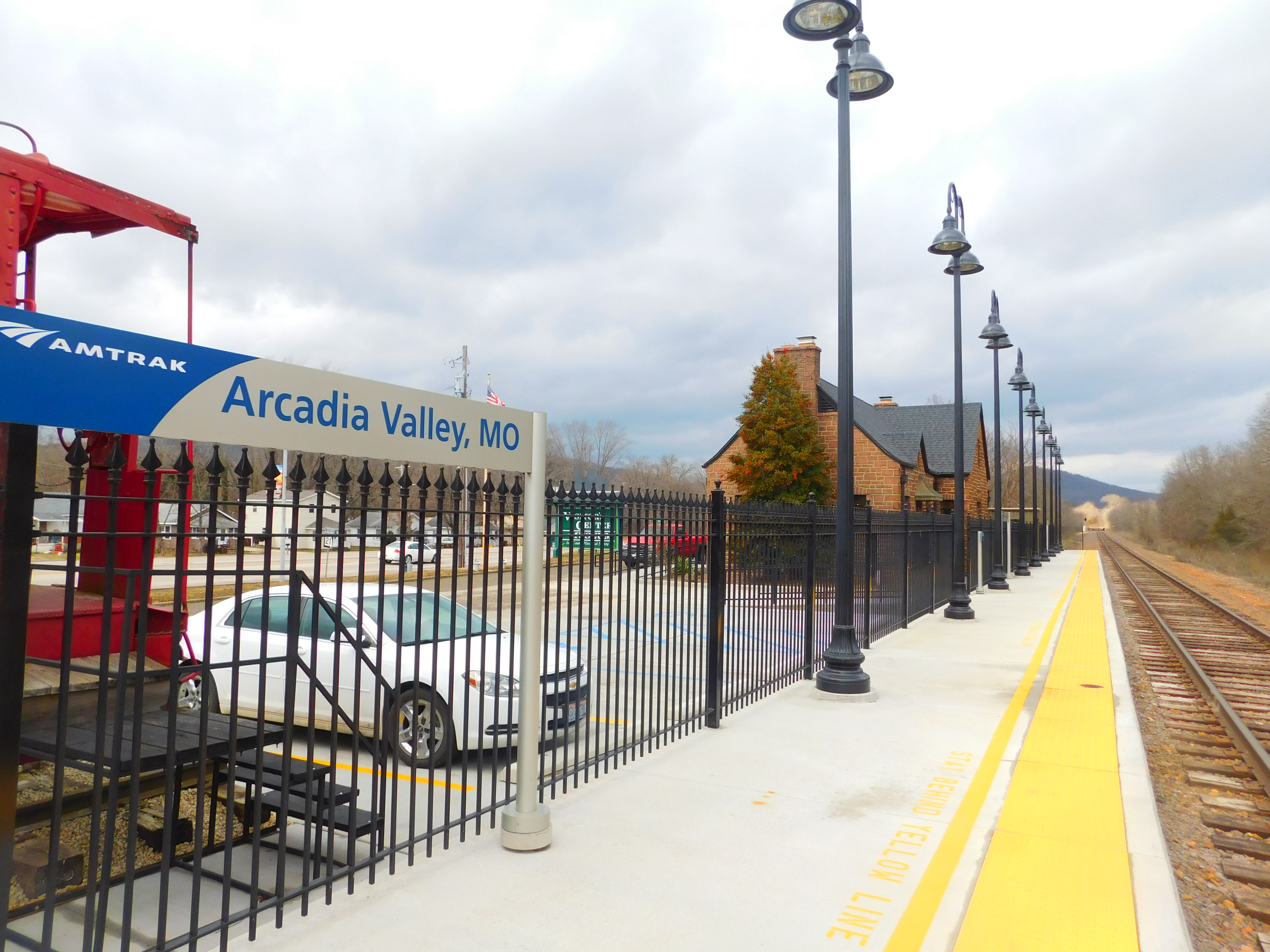
- The Arcadia Valley station two months after opening, January 2017

General information
- Location: 13700 Highway 21; Arcadia, Missouri; United States
- Coordinates: 37°35′32″N 90°37′28″W
- Owner: Our Town Tomorrow (OTT)
- Line: Union Pacific Railroad
- Platforms: 1 side platform
- Tracks: 1
- Train operators: Amtrak

Construction
- Accessible: Yes

Other information
- Station code: Amtrak: ACD

History
- Opened: 1941; November 20, 2016
- Closed: 1965
- Rebuilt: 2016
- Former names: Arcadia–Ironton

Passengers
- FY 2025: 1,306 (Amtrak)

Services
Preceding station	Amtrak	Following station
Poplar Bluff toward Los Angeles or San Antonio	Texas Eagle	St. Louis toward Chicago
Former services
Preceding station	Missouri Pacific Railroad	Following station
Annapolis toward Texarkana	Texarkana – St. Louis	Ironton toward St. Louis
Location

Arcadia Valley station is a passenger rail station in Arcadia, Missouri. The station is located on Amtrak's Texas Eagle line.

== Background ==
Passenger service in the Arcadia Valley was once served by St. Louis, Iron Mountain and Southern Railway with a northbound depot in Arcadia and a southbound depot in Ironton. A new depot was constructed by Missouri Pacific in 1941 to consolidate the depots in Arcadia and Ironton. The new depot was called Arcadia-Ironton to assuage bickering between the two towns on its naming. Passenger service ceased in 1965 and the depot is currently occupied by the Arcadia Valley Chamber of Commerce and the Iron County Historical Society.

The proposed train station began in 2010 when Our Town Tomorrow coordinated with Chamber Tourism Committee for Arcadia Valley to pursue an Amtrak stop. In 2012, Amtrak, MoDOT, Union Pacific, and community members came forward to work together drafting documents and secure funds for the new train station. After securing over $600,000 in funds needed to construct the new station, ground was broken in April 2016. The station was completed in October, and was formally opened with a ribbon cutting and ceremonial train stop for dignitaries on November 17, 2016. Regular passenger service commenced on November 20, 2016.

== See also ==
- List of Amtrak stations
