= Walnut Ridge station =

Railway station in Walnut Ridge, Arkansas, United States

Walnut Ridge, AR
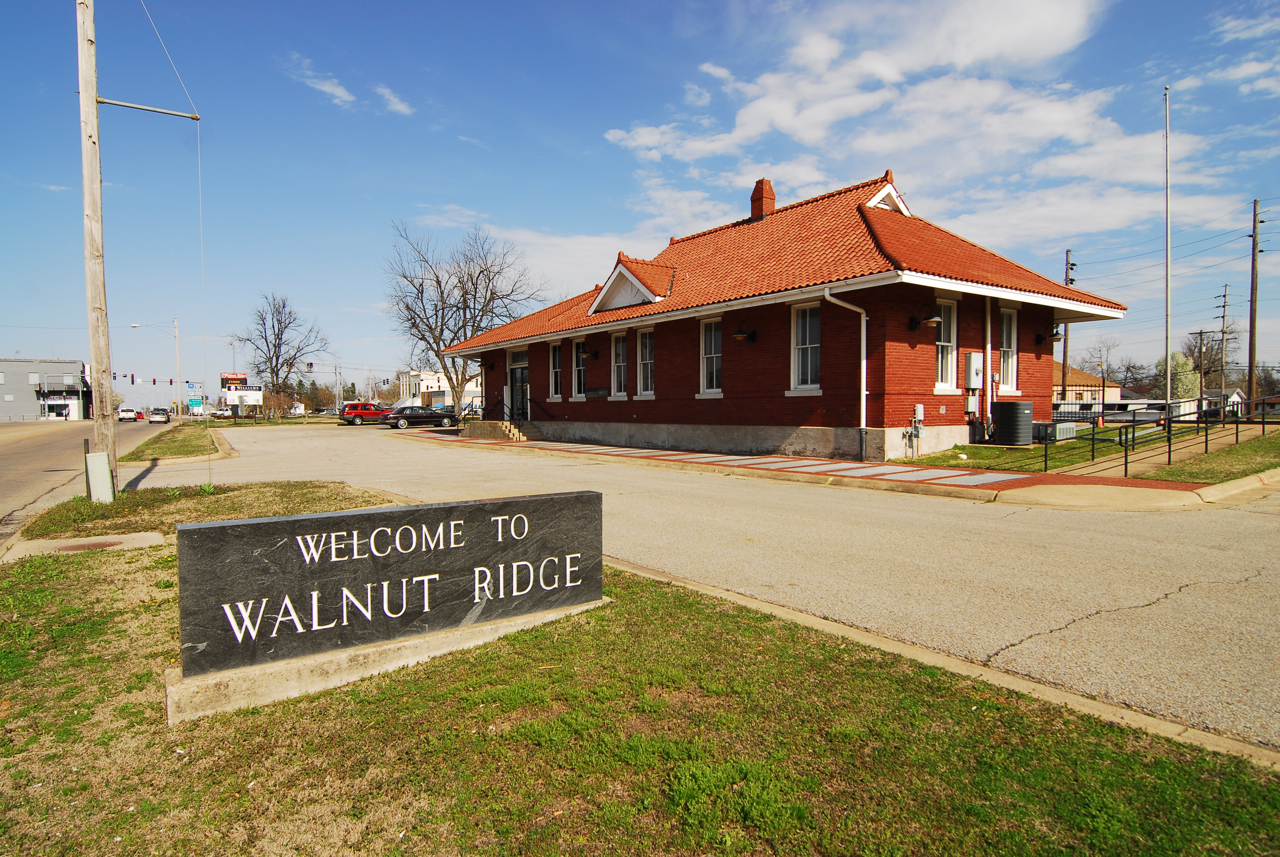

General information
- Location: 109 Southwest Front Street; Walnut Ridge, Arkansas; United States
- Coordinates: 36°04′03″N 90°57′24″W
- Owner: City of Walnut Ridge
- Line: Union Pacific Railroad
- Platforms: 1 side platform
- Tracks: 2

Other information
- Station code: Amtrak: WNR

History
- Opened: 1908; September 14, 1974
- Closed: April 30, 1971
- Rebuilt: 1995

Passengers
- FY 2025: 4,259 (Amtrak)

Services
Preceding station	Amtrak	Following station
Little Rock toward Los Angeles or San Antonio	Texas Eagle	Poplar Bluff toward Chicago
Former services
Preceding station	Amtrak	Following station
Newport Closed 1996 toward Los Angeles or San Antonio	Texas Eagle	Poplar Bluff toward Chicago
Newport toward Laredo or Houston	Inter-American	Poplar Bluff toward Chicago
Preceding station	Missouri Pacific Railroad	Following station
Hoxie toward Texarkana	Texarkana – St. Louis	O'Kean toward St. Louis
- Missouri Pacific Railroad Depot-Walnut Ridge
- U.S. National Register of Historic Places
- Location: Walnut Ridge, Arkansas
- Architect: Missouri Pacific Railroad
- NRHP reference No.: 92000622
- Added to NRHP: 1992
Location

Walnut Ridge is a train station in Walnut Ridge, Arkansas, United States, that is currently served by Amtrak, the national railroad passenger system. It was originally a Missouri Pacific Railroad station and has been listed on the National Register of Historic Places since 1992.

== History ==
The Missouri-Pacific Railroad ended service on its crack Texas Eagle on April 30, 1971, one day before Amtrak took over passenger services. In March 1974, Amtrak's Inter-American was extended from Fort Worth to St. Louis, restoring passenger service to the Missouri-Pacific Railroad's main line. On September 15, 1974, stops were added at the former Missouri-Pacific stations in Walnut Ridge and Newport. The Inter-American was replaced by the Eagle in 1981, which in turn became the Texas Eagle in 1988.

The depot was restored in 1995 with funding made available through the Arkansas Highway and Transportation Department and the Walnut Ridge Area Chamber of Commerce.

== See also ==
- List of Amtrak stations
- National Register of Historic Places listings in Lawrence County, Arkansas
