= Malvern station (Arkansas) =

Train station in Malvern, Arkansas

Malvern, AR
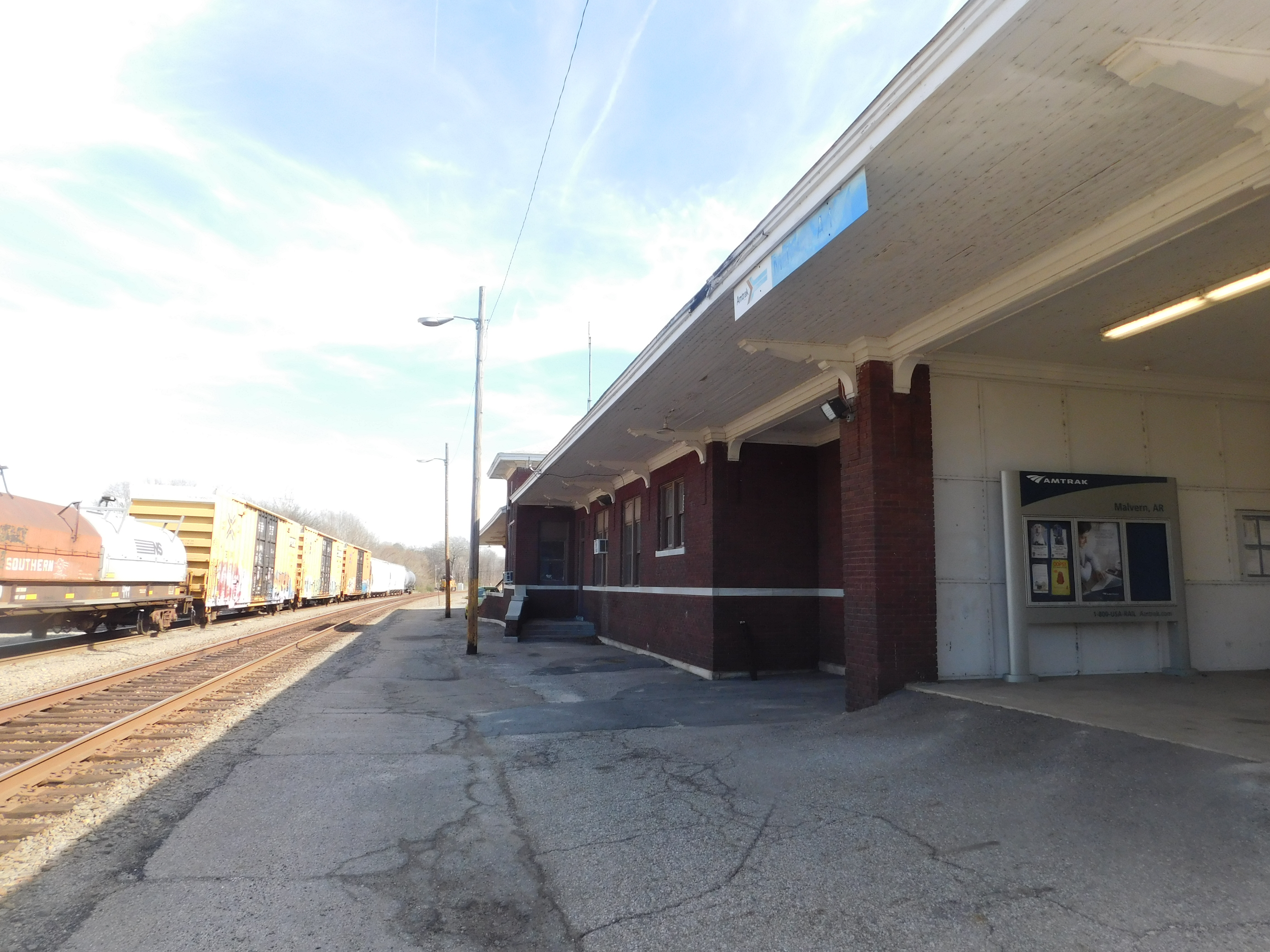
- The depot at Malvern in February 2017.

General information
- Location: 200 East First Street; Malvern, Arkansas; United States
- Coordinates: 34°21′56″N 92°48′49″W
- Line: Union Pacific Railroad
- Platforms: 1 side platform
- Tracks: 2

Other information
- Station code: Amtrak: MVN

History
- Opened: 1916

Passengers
- FY 2025: 2,007 (Amtrak)

Services
Preceding station	Amtrak	Following station
Arkadelphia toward Los Angeles or San Antonio	Texas Eagle	Little Rock toward Chicago
Former services
Preceding station	Amtrak	Following station
Texarkana toward Laredo or Houston	Inter-American	Little Rock toward Chicago
Preceding station	Missouri Pacific Railroad	Following station
Donaldson toward Texarkana	Texarkana – St. Louis	Traskwood toward St. Louis
- Missouri Pacific Railroad Depot-Malvern
- U.S. National Register of Historic Places
- Location: Malvern, Arkansas
- MPS: Historic Railroad Depots of Arkansas MPS
- NRHP reference No.: 92000615
- Added to NRHP: June 11, 1992
Location

Malvern station is a train station at 200 East First Street in Malvern, Arkansas. A former Missouri Pacific Railroad station, this 24-by-84-foot (7.3 by 25.6 m) red brick depot was originally constructed in 1916. Amtrak's Texas Eagle serves Malvern with one daily passenger train in each direction. The station is unstaffed and, because trains stop on a flag stop basis, advance reservations are strongly recommended.

From 1876 to 1901, Malvern was the only junction point for rail passengers desiring to travel to Hot Springs National Park. Passengers arriving on the St. Louis, Iron Mountain and Southern, a predecessor of Missouri Pacific Railroad, would transfer at Malvern to the trains of the Hot Springs Railroad. The former roundhouse of the Hot Springs Railroad is located across the track from the Malvern Amtrak station.

Malvern is the closest Amtrak station for Hot Springs National Park, but it is now necessary to travel by automobile over the 20 miles between the two points.

== See also ==
- List of Amtrak stations
