= San Marcos station =

Train station in San Marcos, Texas

San Marcos, TX
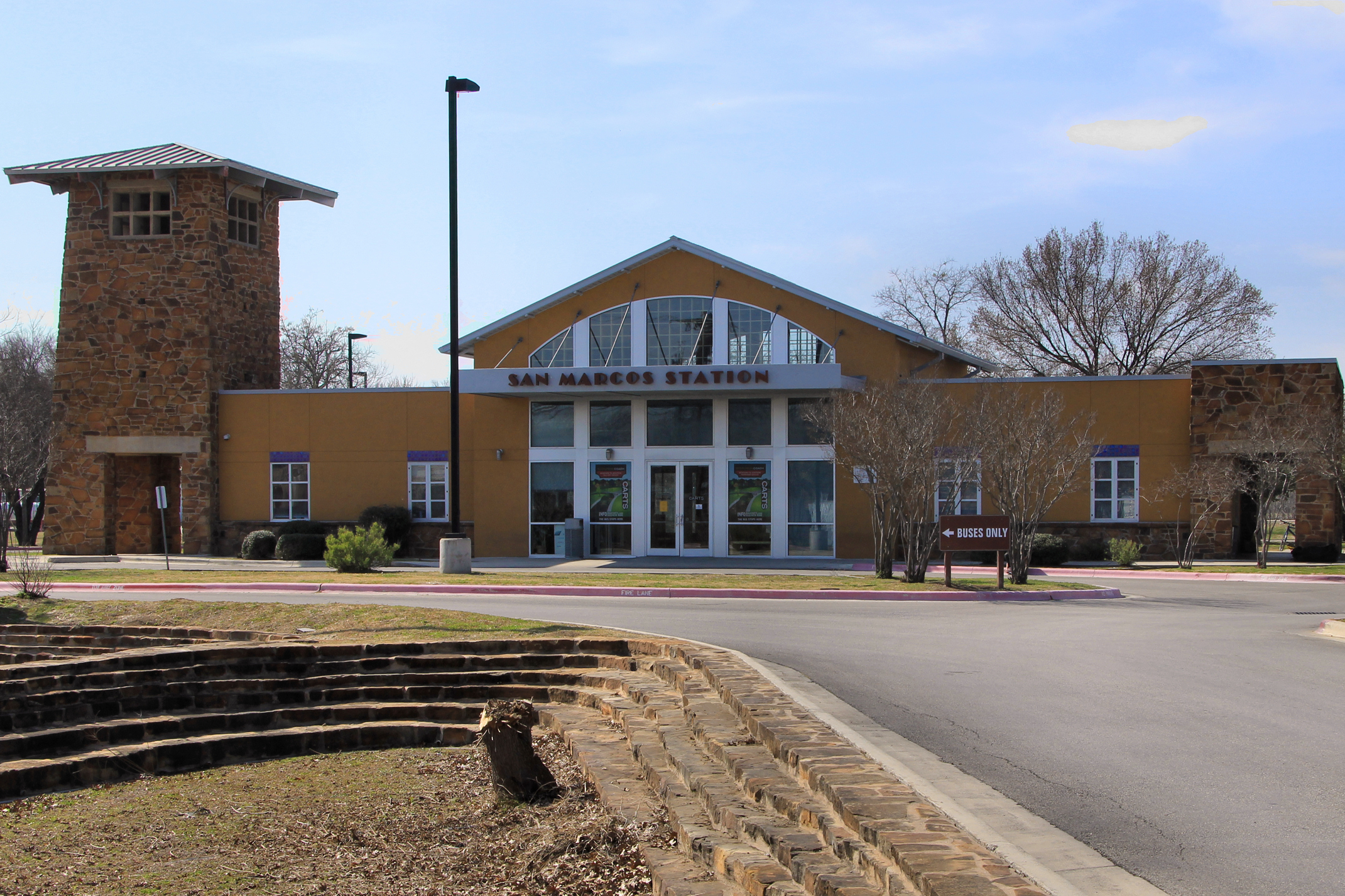

General information
- Location: 338 South Guadalupe Street; San Marcos, Texas; United States
- Coordinates: 29.87685°N 97.94045°W
- Owner: CARTS
- Line: Union Pacific Railroad
- Platforms: 1 side platform
- Tracks: 1

Other information
- Station code: Amtrak: SMC

History
- Opened: 2001

Passengers
- FY 2025: 10,404 (Amtrak)

Services
Preceding station	Amtrak	Following station
San Antonio Terminus	Texas Eagle	Austin toward Chicago
San Antonio toward Los Angeles	Texas Eagle	Austin toward Chicago
Former services
Preceding station	Amtrak	Following station
San Antonio toward Laredo	Inter-American	Austin toward Chicago
Location

San Marcos station is an intermodal transit center in San Marcos, Texas with primary ridership towards Dallas–Fort Worth. 19.4% of ridership commutes locally. 12.5% of embarking riders travel as far as Chicago, with a minority of this segment alternatively traveling to Los Angeles.

It is served by Amtrak's Texas Eagle line as well as Capital Area Rural Transportation System and Greyhound Lines buses.
