= Rosenberg Railroad Museum =

Rosenberg, TX
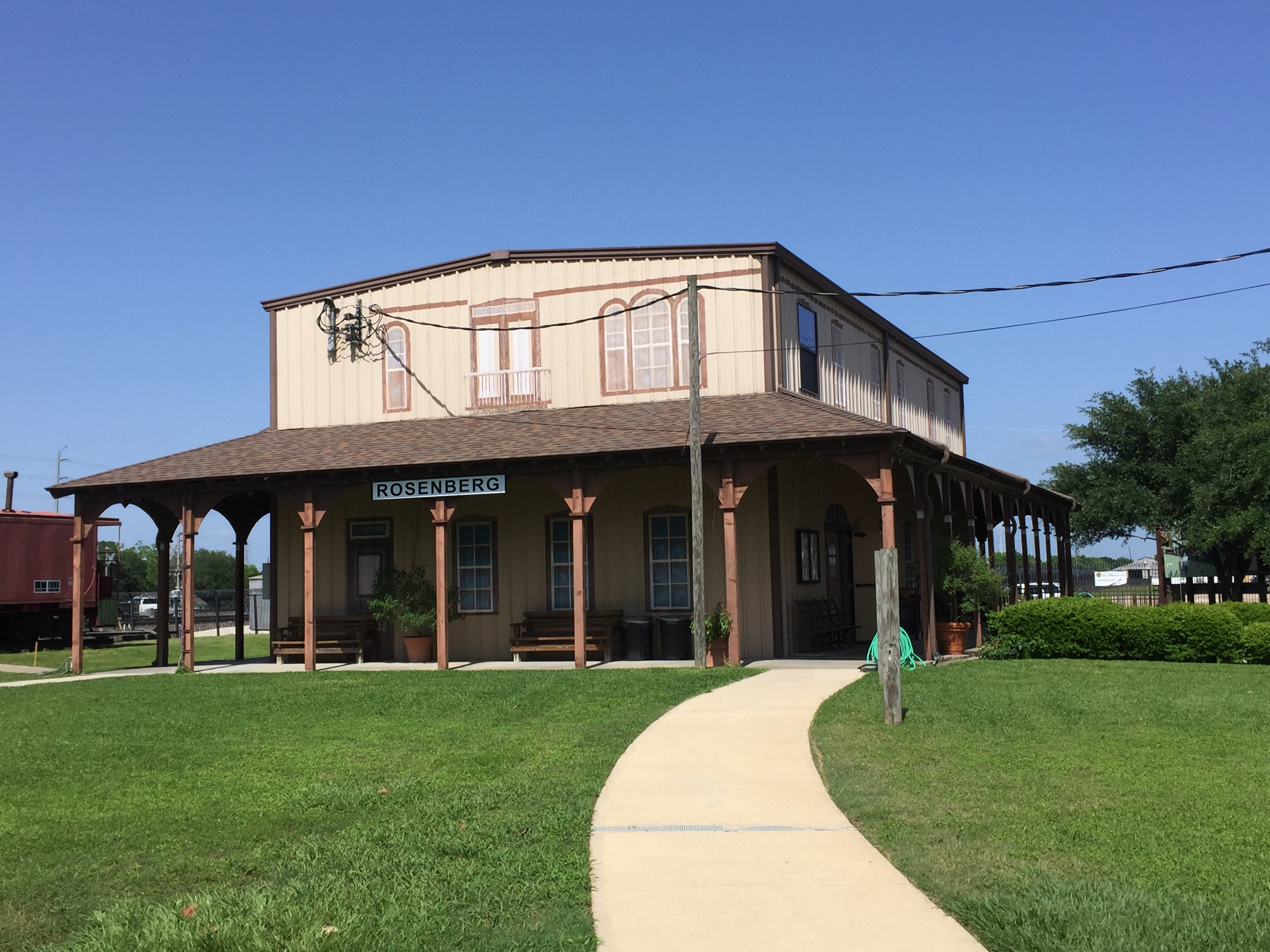
- The Rosenberg Railroad Museum, located behind the former Southern Pacific Railroad depot.

General information
- Location: 700 3rd Street; Rosenberg, Texas; United States
- Coordinates: 29.561031°N 95.807053°W
- Lines: BNSF, Union Pacific, and CPKC

History
- Opened: 1917
- Closed: October 1, 1981

Former services
Preceding station	Amtrak	Following station
Brenham toward Chicago	Lone Star 1974-1979	Houston Terminus
Brenham toward Chicago	Inter-American 1973-1981	Houston Terminus
Preceding station	Southern Pacific Railroad	Following station
East Bernard toward Los Angeles	Sunset Route	Houston toward New Orleans
Location

The Rosenberg Railroad Museum is a non-profit organization located near the former Rosenberg station for Southern Pacific Railroad And Amtrak at 1921 Avenue F, Rosenberg, Texas and maintains exhibits relating to local railroad history of Fort bend County.

== History ==
=== Southern Pacific Railroad ===
The station opened in 1917, it was first served by the Sunset Limited, operated by the Southern Pacific Railroad. the station was use as a flag stop up until April 1971.

=== Amtrak ===
In May 1, 1971 Amtrak took over Inter-city rail Train companies including the "Sunset limited" but it no longer stops at Rosenberg station. In 1973, the Inter-American route was created, from Chicago to Houston or Laredo it was also used as a flag stop for the Inter-American. A year later in 1974 the Lone Star route was created, stopping at Rosenberg as an infill station.

=== Closing ===
In 1979 the "Lone Star" was discounted due to severe budget cuts, making the "Inter-American" the only route to stop at the station. On October 1, 1981 the station was closed due to the discontinuation of the "inter-American."

=== Rosenberg Railroad Museum ===
In 1992, a group of citizens formed a committee to establish a museum to preserve the railroad history of Fort bend County. by 1993, committee chairman judge Larry convinced Atchison, Topeka, and Santa Fe Railway to donate 1.47 acres of land in downtown Rosenberg. near the former Rosenberg union depot. in 1998 construction began building a replica of the station as a museum gallery.

=== Grand Opening ===
In 2002 the Railroad Museum was completed and opened on June 6 that same year.
