= WNR =

WNR, or wnr, may refer to:

- WNR, the Amtrak code for Walnut Ridge station in the state of Arkansas, US
- WNR, the IATA code for Windorah Airport in the state of Queensland, Australia
- WNR, the National Rail code for Windsor & Eton Riverside railway station in the county of Berkshire, UK
