= Arkadelphia station =

American rail station

Arkadelphia, AR
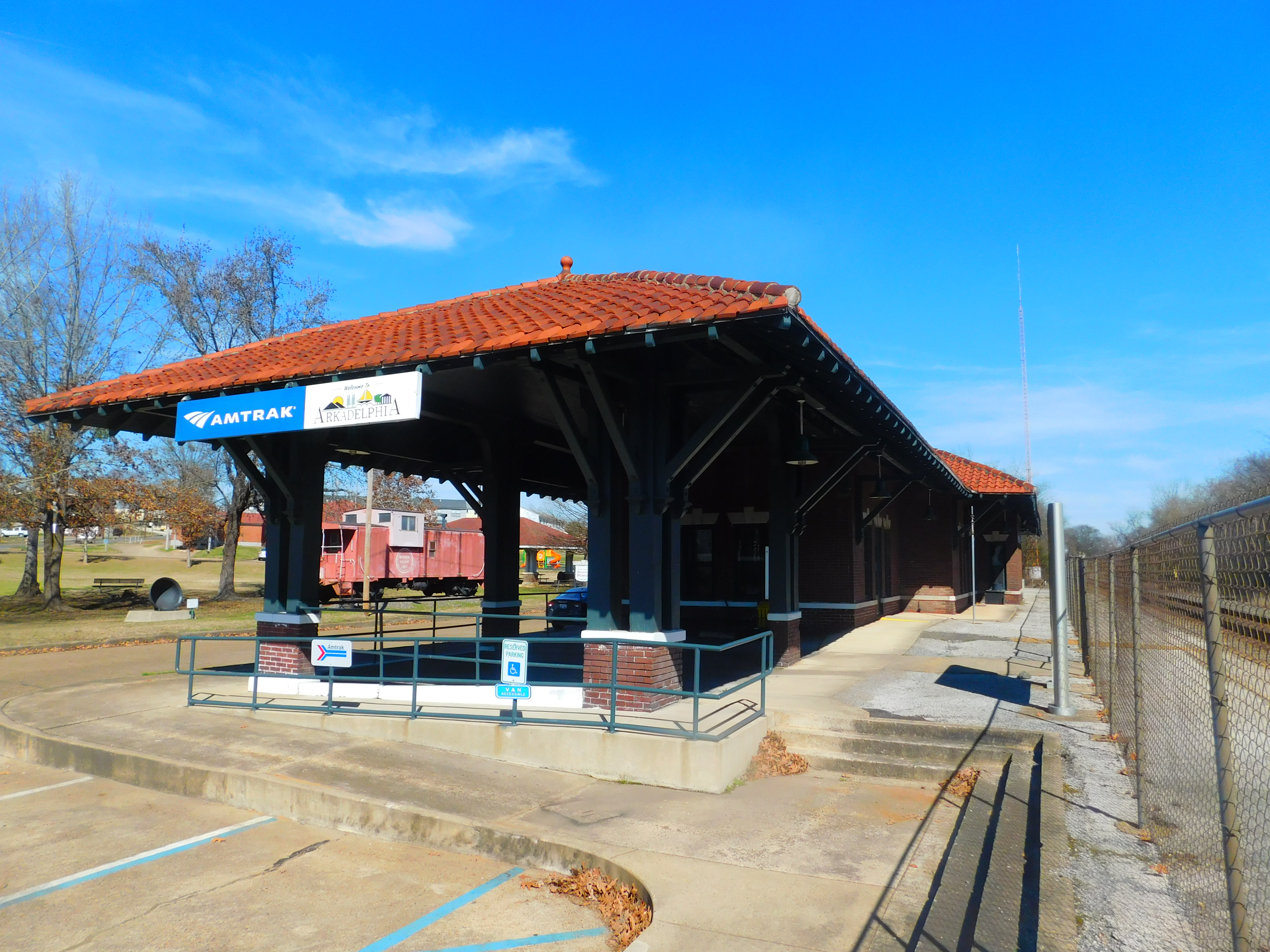
- The depot at Arkadelphia in February 2017 with the Amtrak station fenced off.

General information
- Location: 798 South 5th Street; Arkadelphia, Arkansas; United States
- Coordinates: 34°06′51″N 93°03′10″W
- Line: Union Pacific Railroad
- Platforms: 1 side platform
- Tracks: 1
- Connections: South Central Arkansas Transit

Other information
- Station code: Amtrak: ARK

History
- Opened: 1917

Passengers
- FY 2025: 1,292 (Amtrak)

Services
Preceding station	Amtrak	Following station
Hope toward Los Angeles or San Antonio	Texas Eagle	Malvern toward Chicago
Former services
Preceding station	Missouri Pacific Railroad	Following station
Smithton toward Texarkana	Texarkana – St. Louis	Donaldson toward St. Louis
- Missouri Pacific Railroad Depot-Arkadelphia
- U.S. National Register of Historic Places
- Location: Arkadelphia, Arkansas
- MPS: Historic Railroad Depots of Arkansas MPS
- NRHP reference No.: 92000599
- Added to NRHP: June 11, 1992
Location

Arkadelphia station is an Amtrak train station located at 798 South Fifth Street in Arkadelphia, Arkansas, in the restored Missouri Pacific Railroad station. Arkadelphia is a stop for the Texas Eagle. The station also serves as the headquarters for the regional transit agency.

== See also ==
- List of Amtrak stations
