= Prescott station =

- Missouri Pacific Depot
- U.S. National Register of Historic Places
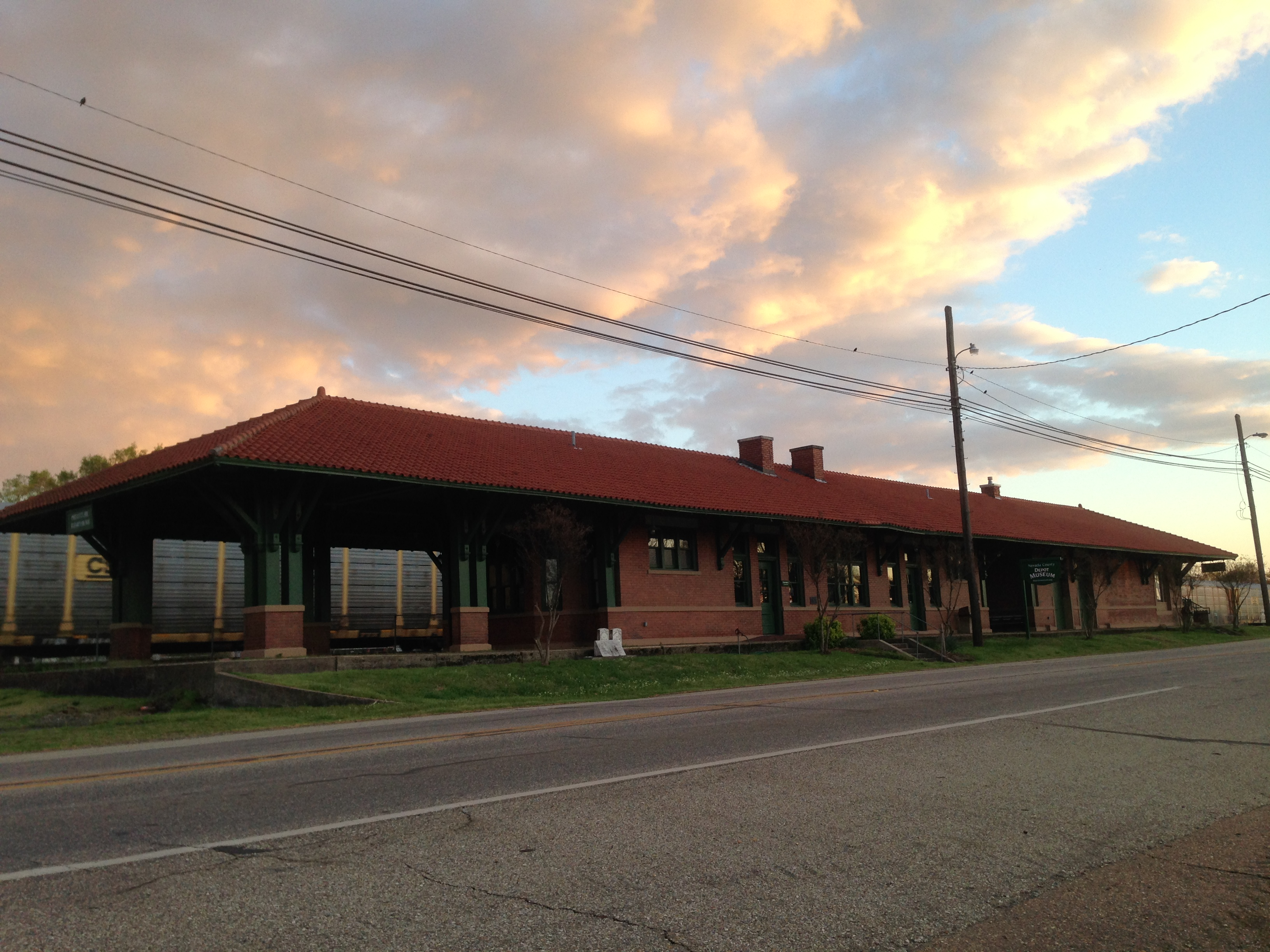

- Location within Arkansas Location within the United States
- Location: 300 W. 1st St. North, Prescott, Arkansas
- Coordinates: 33°47′45″N 93°23′22″W
- Area: less than one acre
- Built: 1912
- NRHP reference No.: 78000614
- Added to NRHP: November 17, 1978

The Missouri Pacific Depot of Prescott, Arkansas, United States, is located at 300 West 1st Street North. It is a 1 1/2-story red brick building, with a breezeway dividing it into two sections. One section continues to be reserved for railroad storage, while the other, the former passenger ticketing and waiting area, has been adapted for use by the local chamber of commerce and as a local history museum. It was built in 1911-12 by the Prescott and Northwestern Railroad, which interconnected with the Missouri-Pacific Railroad at Prescott. The line had passenger service until 1945.

The building is now known as the Nevada County Depot and Museum. Exhibits include area settlers, railroads, and military items from World War I, World War II, the American Legion, National Guard of the United States, 1941 U.S. Army maneuvers in Prescott.

The depot building was listed on the National Register of Historic Places in 1978.

Preceding station	Missouri Pacific Railroad	Following station
Emmet toward Texarkana	Texarkana – St. Louis	Bierne toward St. Louis

== See also ==
- National Register of Historic Places listings in Nevada County, Arkansas
