= Gurdon station =

- Missouri-Pacific Railroad Depot-Gurdon
- U.S. National Register of Historic Places
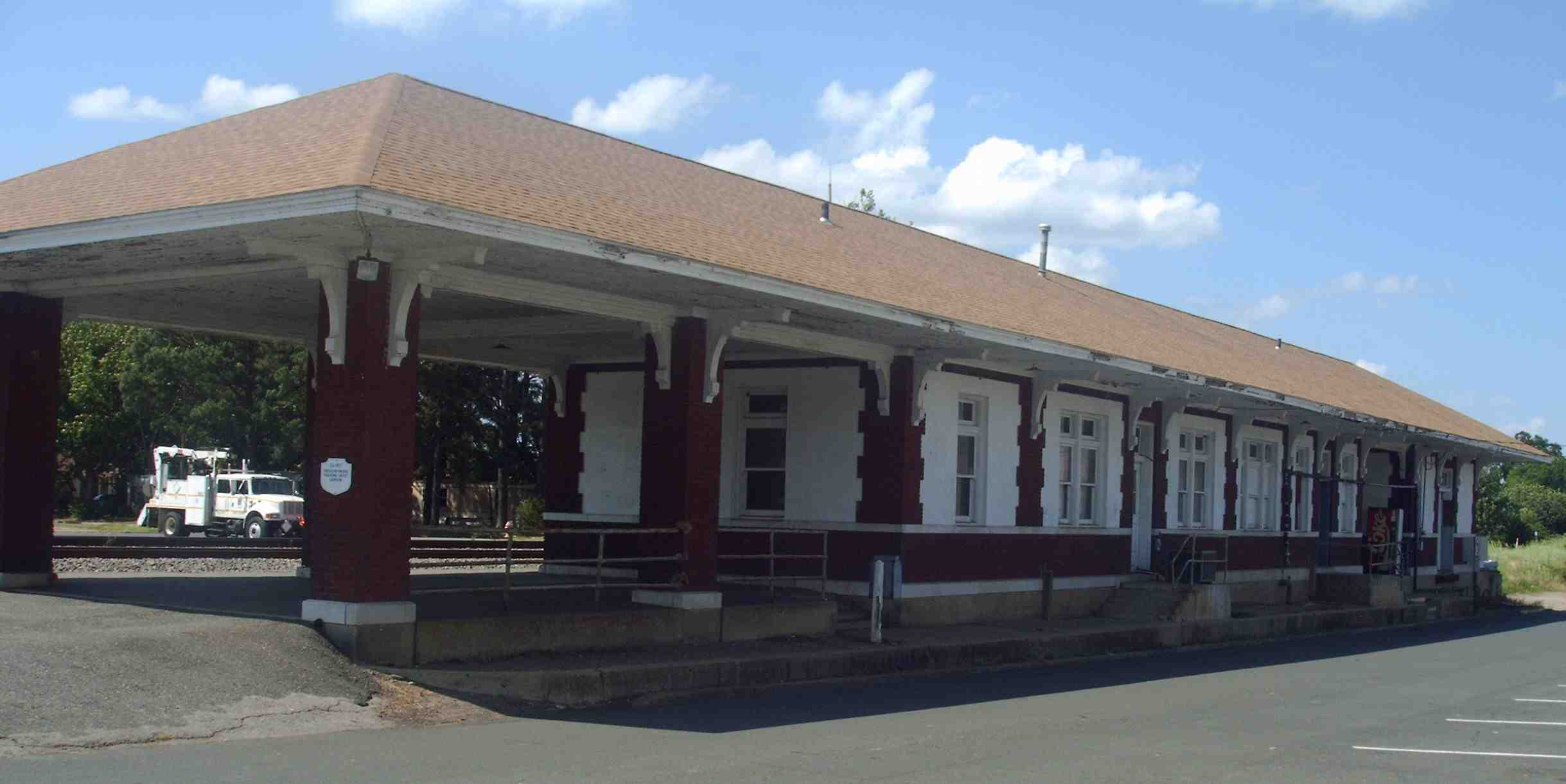

- Location within Arkansas Location within the United States
- Location: NW of jct. of N. First and E. Walnut Sts., Gurdon, Arkansas
- Coordinates: 33°55′14″N 93°9′7″W
- Area: less than one acre
- Built: 1917
- Built by: Missouri-Pacific Railroad
- Architectural style: Late 19th And 20th Century Revivals, Mediterranean
- MPS: Historic Railroad Depots of Arkansas MPS
- NRHP reference No.: 92000609
- Added to NRHP: June 11, 1992

The Missouri-Pacific Railroad Depot-Gurdon is a historic railroad station building at North 1st Street and East Walnut Street in Gurdon, Arkansas. The single-story masonry building was built c. 1917 by the Missouri-Pacific Railroad to house passenger and freight service facilities. It is built in the Mediterranean Renaissance style which was then popular for building such structures in Arkansas. It has a red clay tile roof, Italianate bracketing, and Baroque quoin molding.

The building was listed on the National Register of Historic Places in 1992.

Preceding station	Missouri Pacific Railroad	Following station
Beirne toward Texarkana	Texarkana – St. Louis	Smithton toward St. Louis
Burtsell toward Norman	Norman - Natchez	Chidester toward Natchez

== See also ==
- National Register of Historic Places listings in Clark County, Arkansas
