= Hope station (Arkansas) =

Train station in Hope, Arkansas

Hope, AR
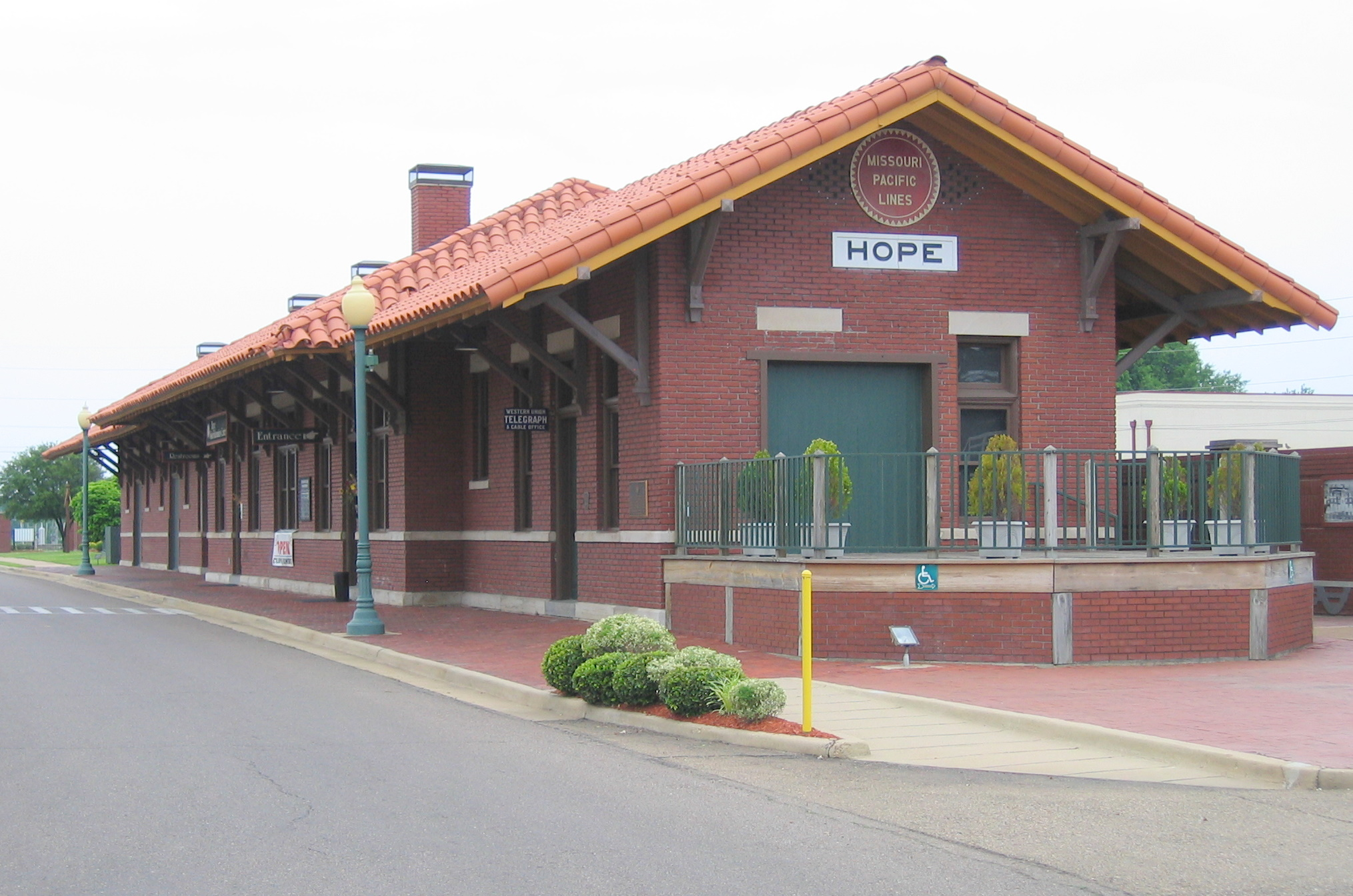
- The historic MoPac station building in 2007

General information
- Location: 100 East Division Street; Hope, Arkansas; United States
- Coordinates: 33°40′08″N 93°35′32″W
- Owner: City of Hope
- Line: Union Pacific Railroad
- Platforms: 1 side platform
- Tracks: 2

Construction
- Accessible: Yes

Other information
- Station code: Amtrak: HOP

History
- Opened: 1912 (StLIM&S); April 4, 2013 (Amtrak)
- Closed: 1968

Passengers
- FY 2025: 1,767 (Amtrak)

Services
Preceding station	Amtrak	Following station
Texarkana toward Los Angeles or San Antonio	Texas Eagle	Arkadelphia toward Chicago
Former services
Preceding station	Missouri Pacific Railroad	Following station
Guernsey toward Texarkana	Texarkana – St. Louis	Emmet toward St. Louis
- Missouri Pacific Railroad Depot--Hope
- U.S. National Register of Historic Places
- U.S. Historic district – Contributing property
- Location: Jct. of E. Division and Main Sts., Hope, Arkansas
- Built: 1917
- Architectural style: Mediterranean Revival
- Part of: Hope Historic Commercial District (ID95000905)
- MPS: Historic Railroad Depots of Arkansas MPS
- NRHP reference No.: 92000610

Significant dates
- Added to NRHP: June 11, 1992
- Designated CP: July 28, 1995
Location

Hope station is a passenger rail station in Hope, Arkansas. The station is located on Amtrak's Texas Eagle line. Trains run daily between Chicago, Illinois, and San Antonio, Texas, and continue to Los Angeles, California, 2,728 miles (4,390 km) total, three days a week.

== History ==
The red brick Hope depot was built in 1912 by the St. Louis, Iron Mountain & Southern Railroad, a subsidiary of Missouri Pacific Railway, more commonly known as the "MoPac." The building exhibits the MoPac's signature Mediterranean Revival style architecture, especially in the gabled red tile roof. A combination depot, the building originally housed passenger and express services under one roof.

The depot remained in active passenger use until November 1968, and then fell into disrepair for many years. However, the station was listed on the National Register of Historic Places on June 11, 1992. To celebrate the election of Hope native Bill Clinton to the U.S. presidency in 1992, a group of citizens advocated for the conversion of the depot into a museum focused on Clinton's life. With the museum concept in place, the Missouri Pacific Railroad Company, by then part of Union Pacific Railroad, donated the depot to the city in 1994. Renovations were finished the next year, and the facility opened to the public. The building also houses a visitor and information center.

The tourism possibilities created by Clinton's presidency prompted civic leaders to approach Amtrak in 1993 about making Hope a regularly scheduled stop for the Texas Eagle. During the depot renovation, part of the building was set aside with the idea that it could one day serve as a passenger waiting room. In October 2010, Amtrak President and CEO Joseph Boardman traveled to Hope to announce that the stop had been approved by Amtrak and the Union Pacific. Each section of the concrete platform is stamped with "Hope, a Slice of the Good Life"—the city's logo and a reference to its famous watermelons.

Amtrak service began on April 4, 2013, and the first train was greeted by fireworks in the early morning hours. More than 150 local citizens boarded the Texas Eagle to ride to Texarkana, then returned on school buses to enjoy a community breakfast in Hope.

== See also ==
- List of Amtrak stations
- National Register of Historic Places listings in Hempstead County, Arkansas
