= Charleston station (Missouri) =

Historic train station in Missouri, US

- Missouri Pacific Depot
- U.S. National Register of Historic Places
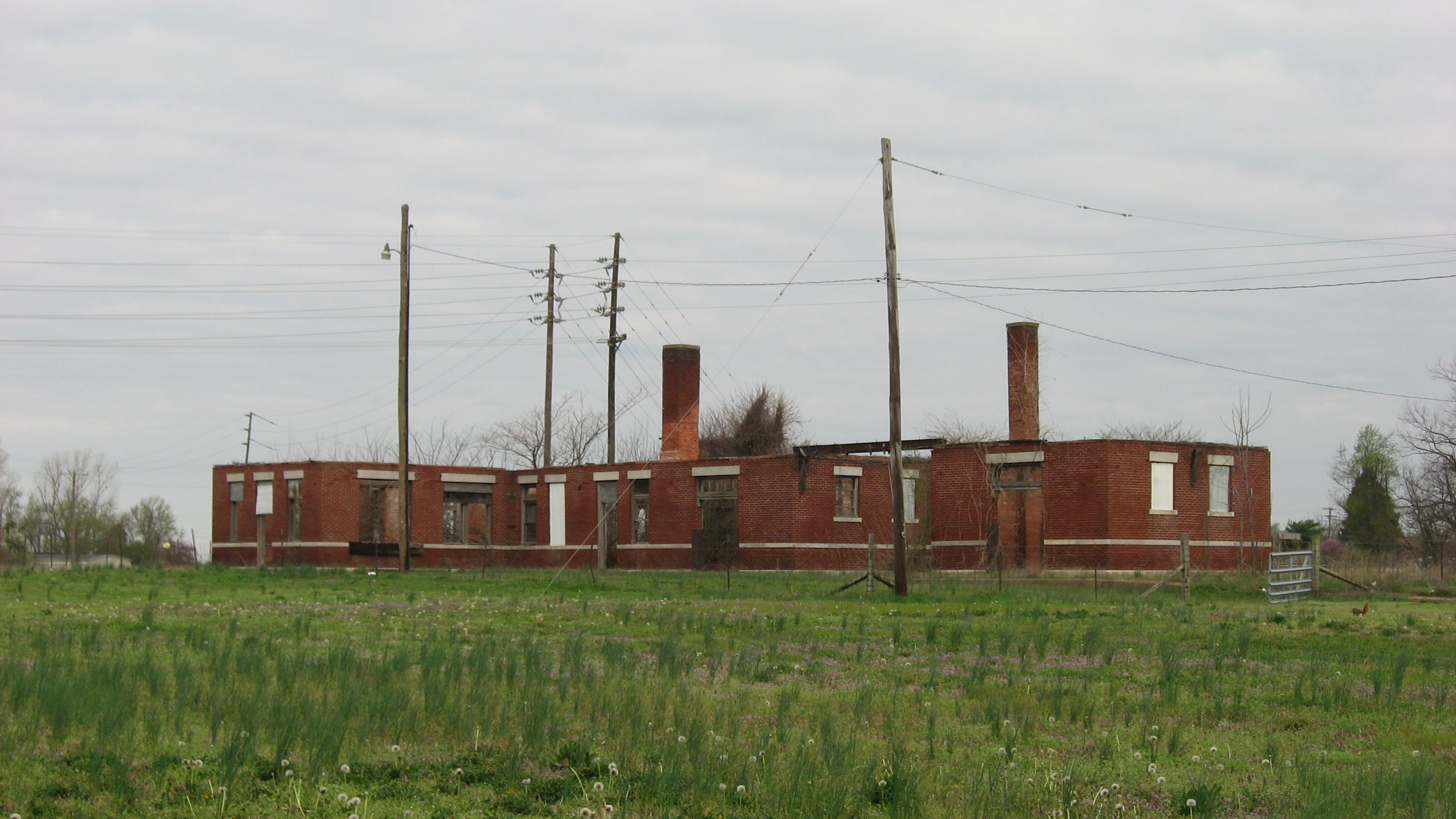
- Missouri Pacific Depot, April 2013

- Location within Missouri Location within the United States
- Location: E of intersecting branches of Missouri Pacific RR., Charleston, Missouri
- Coordinates: 36°55′22″N 89°21′28″W
- Area: 9.9 acres (4.0 ha)
- Built: 1916–1917
- Architect: Missouri Pacific Railroad
- NRHP reference No.: 72000722
- Added to NRHP: November 30, 1972

Missouri Pacific Depot is a historic train station located at Charleston, Mississippi County, Missouri. It was built in 1916–1917 by the Missouri Pacific Railroad, and is a one-story, rectangular brick building with white, smooth-cut limestone wainscotting. The building measures 24 by 149 feet (7.3 m × 45.4 m). It had a red tile hipped roof with a seven foot wide overhang.

Preceding station	Missouri Pacific Railroad	Following station
Blodgett toward Bismarck	Bismarck – Charleston	Terminus
Bertrand toward Poplar Bluff	Poplar Bluff – Charleston	Terminus

It was added to the National Register of Historic Places in 1972.
