= Texas Eagle =

Amtrak service between Chicago and Los Angeles via Texas

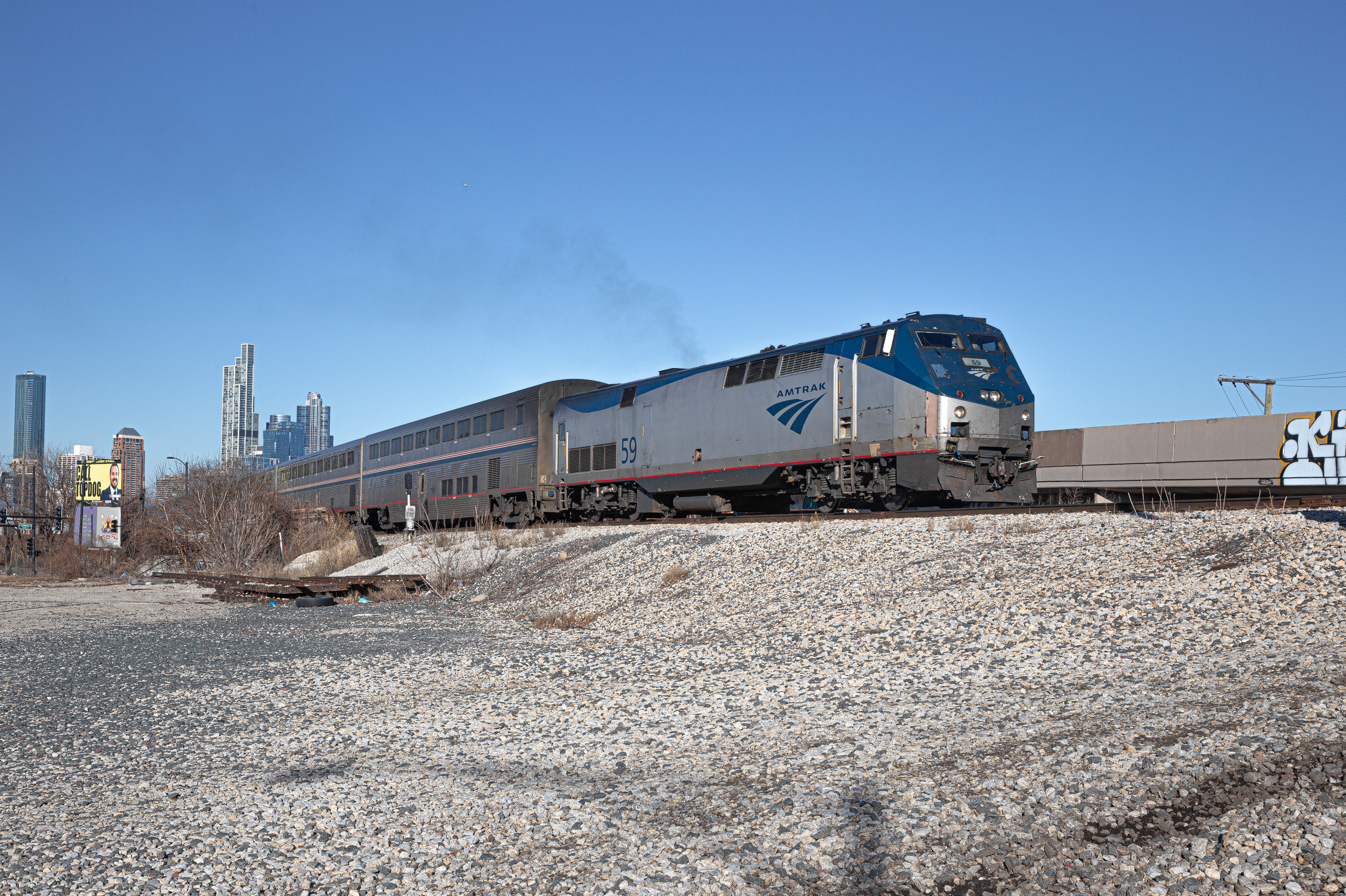
- Texas Eagle in Chicago, 2025

Overview
- Service type: Inter-city rail, higher-speed rail
- Locale: Midwest, Southern United States, and Southwestern United States (daily)
- Predecessor: Inter-American
- First service: October 2, 1981
- Current operator: Amtrak
- Annual ridership: 372,135 (FY 25) ▲14.3% (Note: Amtrak's Fiscal Year (FY) runs from October 1 of the prior year to September 30 of the named year.)

Route
- Termini: Chicago, Illinois; San Antonio, Texas or Los Angeles, California
- Stops: 43
- Distance travelled: 1,306 mi (2,102 km) (to San Antonio); 2,728 mi (4,390 km) (to Los Angeles)
- Average journey time: 30 hours 56 minutes (San Antonio to Chicago); 32 hours 24 minutes (Chicago to San Antonio); 61 hours 44 minutes (Los Angeles to Chicago); 65 hours 43 minutes (Chicago to Los Angeles)
- Service frequency: Daily (tri-weekly to Los Angeles)
- Train numbers: 21, 22 (to San Antonio); 321, 322 (to St. Louis); 421, 422 (to Los Angeles)

On-board services
- Classes: Coach Class; First Class Sleeper Service
- Disabled access: Train lower level, all stations
- Sleeping arrangements: Roomette (2 beds); Bedroom (2 beds); Bedroom Suite (4 beds); Accessible Bedroom (2 beds); Family Bedroom (4 beds)
- Catering facilities: Dining car (San Antonio-Los Angeles only), Café
- Observation facilities: Sightseer lounge car
- Baggage facilities: Overhead racks, checked baggage available at selected stations

Technical
- Rolling stock: GE Genesis or Siemens ALC-42 locomotives; Superliner passenger cars
- Track gauge: 4 ft 8 1/2 in (1,435 mm) standard gauge
- Operating speed: 55 mph (89 km/h) (avg.); 100 mph (161 km/h) (top)
- Track owners: UP, BNSF, CN

The Texas Eagle is a long-distance passenger train operated daily by Amtrak on a 1,306-mile (2,102 km) route between Chicago, Illinois, and San Antonio, Texas, with major stops in St. Louis, Little Rock, Dallas, Fort Worth, and Austin. Three days per week, the train joins the Sunset Limited in San Antonio and continues to Los Angeles via El Paso and Tucson. The combined 2,728-mile (4,390 km) route is the longest in the United States and the second-longest in the Americas, after The Canadian.

Prior to 1988, the train was known simply as the Eagle.

== History ==
Amtrak's Texas Eagle is the direct successor of the Missouri Pacific Railroad and Texas and Pacific Railway train of the same name, which was inaugurated in 1948 and ultimately discontinued in 1971. The route of Amtrak's Texas Eagle is longer (Chicago to San Antonio versus St. Louis to San Antonio), but much of today's route is historically a part of the original Texas Eagle route. St. Louis to Texarkana and Taylor, Texas, to San Antonio travels over former Missouri Pacific Railroad trackage, while the Texarkana to Fort Worth segment traverses the former Texas and Pacific Railway. The T&P merged with MoPac in 1982; in turn MoPac was acquired by Union Pacific in 1986.

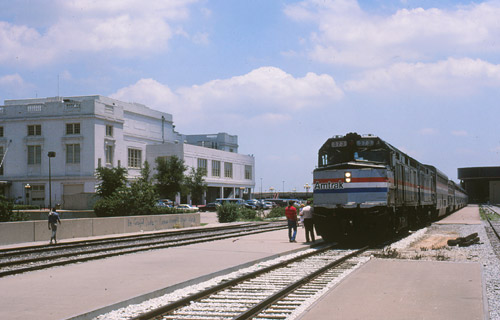
The Eagle at Dallas in 1987

The Eagle began on October 2, 1981, as a restructuring of the Inter-American, which had operated a daily schedule from Chicago to Laredo, Texas, via San Antonio since 1973. From 1979 onward, it operated a section to Houston, which diverged at Temple, Texas. The new Eagle dropped the Houston section, while its southern terminus was cut back from Laredo to San Antonio. The new train carried Superliner equipment, replacing the Amfleet coaches on the Inter-American. In addition, the new train ran on a thrice-weekly schedule with a through car on the Sunset Limited to Los Angeles, although the latter was not announced until the April 1982 timetable.

On November 15, 1988, Amtrak revived a Houston section, this time diverging at Dallas and running over the route of the Southern Pacific's Sunbeam. It was the first time passenger traffic had served that route since 1958. Amtrak had intended to operate the Lone Star over this route back in the 1970 but the Southern Pacific declined to host the service and requested the National Arbitration Panel review the request. The Panel's consultant provided a reasonable cost estimate for track and signal upgrades but Amtrak abruptly withdrew the request in March 1974. With the change, Amtrak revived the name Texas Eagle for the thrice-weekly Chicago-San Antonio/Houston train, while the off-day Chicago–St. Louis train remained the Eagle. This section would be discontinued on September 10, 1995.

In February 1998, one weekly Texas Eagle was extended west to Los Angeles independent of the Sunset Limited, providing a fourth weekly round trip between Los Angeles and San Antonio. Daily service between Chicago and San Antonio resumed on May 21, 2000. At that time, the UP (which had recently acquired the Southern Pacific) began directional running on separate lines between Texarkana and Big Sandy, Texas. This routed the southbound Texas Eagle away from the stops at Marshall and Longview; they were served with bus connections to a temporary stop at Gilmer, Texas. On March 14, 2001, the southbound train resumed its former routing; in exchange, Amtrak dropped the independent Texas Eagle west of San Antonio on March 2.

Infill stations were added at Hope, Arkansas, on April 4, 2013; and at Arcadia, Missouri on November 17, 2016. In August 2023, Amtrak approved construction of an infill station in De Soto, Missouri. Service was reduced to tri-weekly throughout the corridor from October 11, 2020, to May 24, 2021, due to the COVID-19 pandemic. The train operated only five days per week from January 2022 to March 2022 due to the Omicron variant.

=== Proposed changes ===
In the August 2009 issue of Trains, Brian Rosenwald, Amtrak's chief of product management, noted that the Sunset Limited might be replaced by an extension of the Texas Eagle to Los Angeles: "We projected the revenue and looked at the logistics, and with a little bit of rescheduling came to the conclusion that we can make this happen with the equipment we have, and the additional revenue the train earns will more than cover the increased operating costs". The move would restore a connection to the Coast Starlight in both directions, and move boarding in Maricopa and Tucson, Arizona, to civilized times. "We are putting a stake in the ground: Triweekly needs to disappear," Rosenwald said. While the route of the Sunset Limited would not be entirely replaced, the performance improvements listed explain what will happen:

- Conversion to daily Chicago–Los Angeles train
- Shortening of the schedule by 9 hours
- San Antonio–New Orleans stub service on a daily basis to connect with this train
- Use of the Diner-Lounge on the stub service

These changes would, in turn, create a through-car change similar to that of the Empire Builder. Such service would originate from Los Angeles and split at San Antonio, and vice versa from New Orleans.

Amtrak suspended plans to convert the Texas Eagle/Sunset Limited into a daily train when UP opposed it, arguing that to run daily service, Amtrak would first have to invest more than $750 million in infrastructure improvements along the route west of San Antonio. UP has subsequently made investments to increase the capacity of the Sunset Route by constructing new sidings and double track sections along the Route.

Passenger totals would double with daily service, according to the PRIIA study that looked at Texas Eagle/Sunset Limited service. It forecast an incremental improvement of more than 100,000 passengers from the daily service, which is already running in excess of 100,000 a year. However, Amtrak still lacks the equipment and funds needed to move to daily service.

In June 2021, Senator Jon Tester of Montana added an amendment to the Surface Transportation Investment Act of 2021 which would require the U.S. Department of Transportation (not Amtrak itself) to evaluate daily service on all less frequent long-distance trains, meaning the Texas Eagle/Sunset Limited and Cardinal. The bill passed the Senate Commerce Committee with bipartisan support, and was later rolled into President Biden's Infrastructure Investment and Jobs Act (IIJA), which Congress passed on November 5, 2021. The report is known as the Amtrak Daily Long-Distance Service Study and must be delivered to Congress within two years. In June 2023, Amtrak submitted an application for a federal grant to increase Texas Eagle/Sunset Limited service to operate daily.

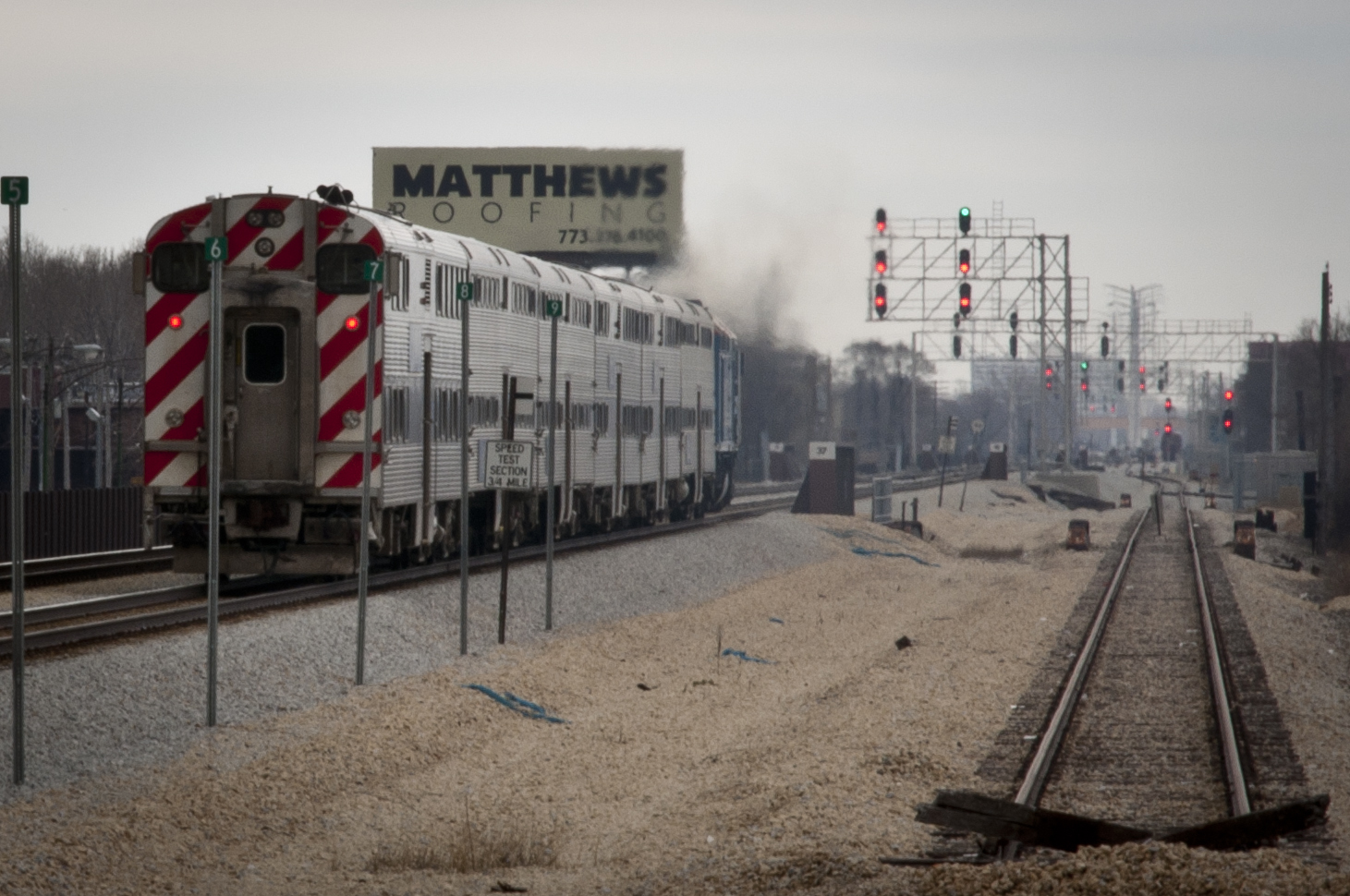
Location of the new third main line currently under construction in Metra's Rock Island District to increase its capacity, in anticipation that the corridor will accommodate not only Amtrak’s Texas Eagle and Lincoln Service trains, but also the SouthWest Service (SWS), which is also operated by Metra

In 2022, as part of the projects submitted under the Chicago Region Environmental and Transportation Efficiency Program (CREATE), a proposal was put forward to reroute the Texas Eagle and Lincoln Service trains via Metra’s Rock Island District on their journey between Joliet and Chicago Union Station. This option, due to the low diamond crossings and little freight train activity, will allow Amtrak services to reduce delays and increase higher speeds between Joliet and Chicago, bypassing the circuitous route through CN Joliet Subdivision they currently use. The heavy freight traffic on the Joliet Sub causes frequent delays to Amtrak trains, and the option to reroute the Texas Eagle and Lincoln Service through the Rock Island District is Amtrak's preferred choice and has been approved by the Federal Railroad Administration (FRA). However, for Amtrak trains to operate on the Rock Island District, modifications would be required in Joliet and Chicago. A third platform would need to be constructed at Joliet Gateway Center, and Amtrak would have to improve the current connection via the St. Charles Air Line between the RID and Union Station. The current connection sees occasional use during maintenance and emergencies, but it limits trains to a maximum speed of 5 mph (8 km/h) and requires trains to reverse into Union Station.

== Operation ==
=== Route ===
As of August 2025, the southbound Texas Eagle (train 21) departs Chicago 1:45 pm, running between Chicago and its first station stop in Joliet, parallel to the Illinois and Michigan Canal, along first the Canadian National's Freeport Subdivision and then Joliet Subdivision, which is also used by Metra's Heritage Corridor and Amtrak's Lincoln Service. From Joliet, the train travels along Union Pacific rails, often parallel to Interstate 55, making station stops in Pontiac, Bloomington–Normal, Lincoln, Springfield, Carlinville (a flag stop), and Alton before crossing the Mississippi River to make its stop at St. Louis' Gateway Multimodal Transportation Center, scheduled for 7:13 pm. After St. Louis, the train skirts the Ozark Mountains, stopping in Poplar Bluff, Missouri, before crossing the state line into Arkansas. In Arkansas, the train stops in Walnut Ridge, the state capital of Little Rock, and the stations at Malvern, Arkadelphia, Hope, and Texarkana, on the Arkansas–Texas border.

Continuing into Texas, the train makes station stops in Marshall, Longview (bus connection with Houston), Mineola, Dallas and Fort Worth, which has connections to Oklahoma City via Amtrak's Heartland Flyer, and from there the train travels on BNSF trackage. The train continues on, making stops in Cleburne, McGregor, Temple (where the train resumes traveling on the Union Pacific), Taylor, the state capital of Austin, and San Marcos, with a scheduled arrival into San Antonio at 9:55 pm (the next day). A sleeping car and a coach (designated internally as train 421) are conveyed to the Sunset Limited on Tuesdays, Thursdays, and Sundays, departing San Antonio at 2:45 am.

The northbound Texas Eagle (train 22) leaves San Antonio at 7 am, splitting from the eastbound Sunset Limited (train 422) on Tuesdays, Fridays, and Sundays. The train arrives in Chicago at 1:44 pm the next day.

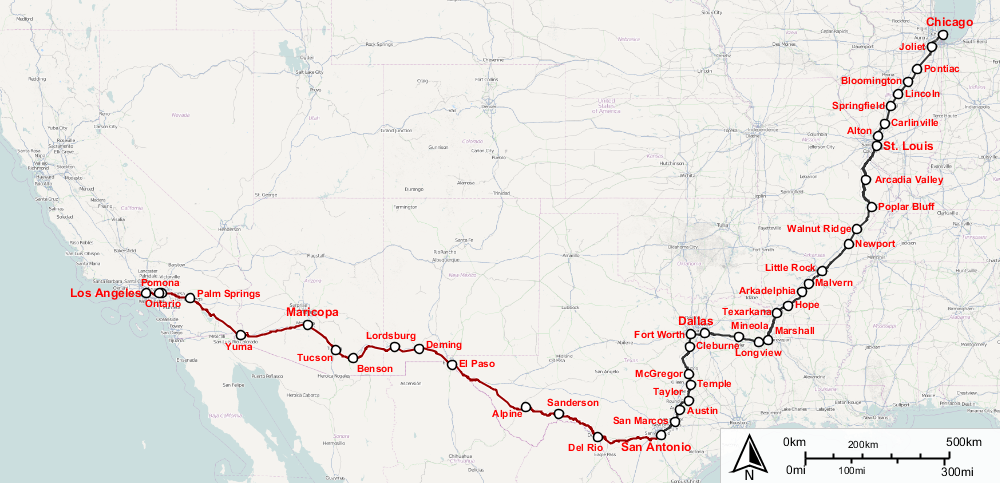
Amtrak Texas Eagle route

=== Stations ===
Amtrak Texas Eagle stations
State/Province	City	Station
Illinois	Chicago	Chicago Union
Illinois	Joliet	Joliet
Illinois	Pontiac	Pontiac
Illinois	Normal	Bloomington–Normal
Illinois	Lincoln	Lincoln
Illinois	Springfield	Springfield
Illinois	Carlinville	Carlinville
Illinois	Alton	Alton
Missouri	St. Louis	St. Louis Gateway
Missouri	Ironton	Arcadia Valley
Missouri	Poplar Bluff	Poplar Bluff
Arkansas	Walnut Ridge	Walnut Ridge
Arkansas	Little Rock	Little Rock
Arkansas	Malvern	Malvern
Arkansas	Arkadelphia	Arkadelphia
Arkansas	Hope	Hope
Arkansas	Texarkana	Texarkana
Texas	Marshall	Marshall
Texas	Longview	Longview
Texas	Mineola	Mineola
Texas	Dallas	Dallas
Texas	Fort Worth	Fort Worth
Texas	Cleburne	Cleburne
Texas	McGregor	McGregor
Texas	Temple	Temple
Texas	Taylor	Taylor
Texas	Austin	Austin
Texas	San Marcos	San Marcos
Texas	San Antonio	San Antonio
Texas	Del Rio	Del Rio
Texas	Sanderson	Sanderson
Texas	Alpine	Alpine
Texas	El Paso	El Paso
New Mexico	Deming	Deming
New Mexico	Lordsburg	Lordsburg
Arizona	Benson	Benson
Arizona	Tucson	Tucson
Arizona	Maricopa	Maricopa
Arizona	Yuma	Yuma
California	Palm Springs	Palm Springs
California	Ontario	Ontario
California	Pomona	Pomona
California	Los Angeles	Los Angeles Union

=== Equipment ===
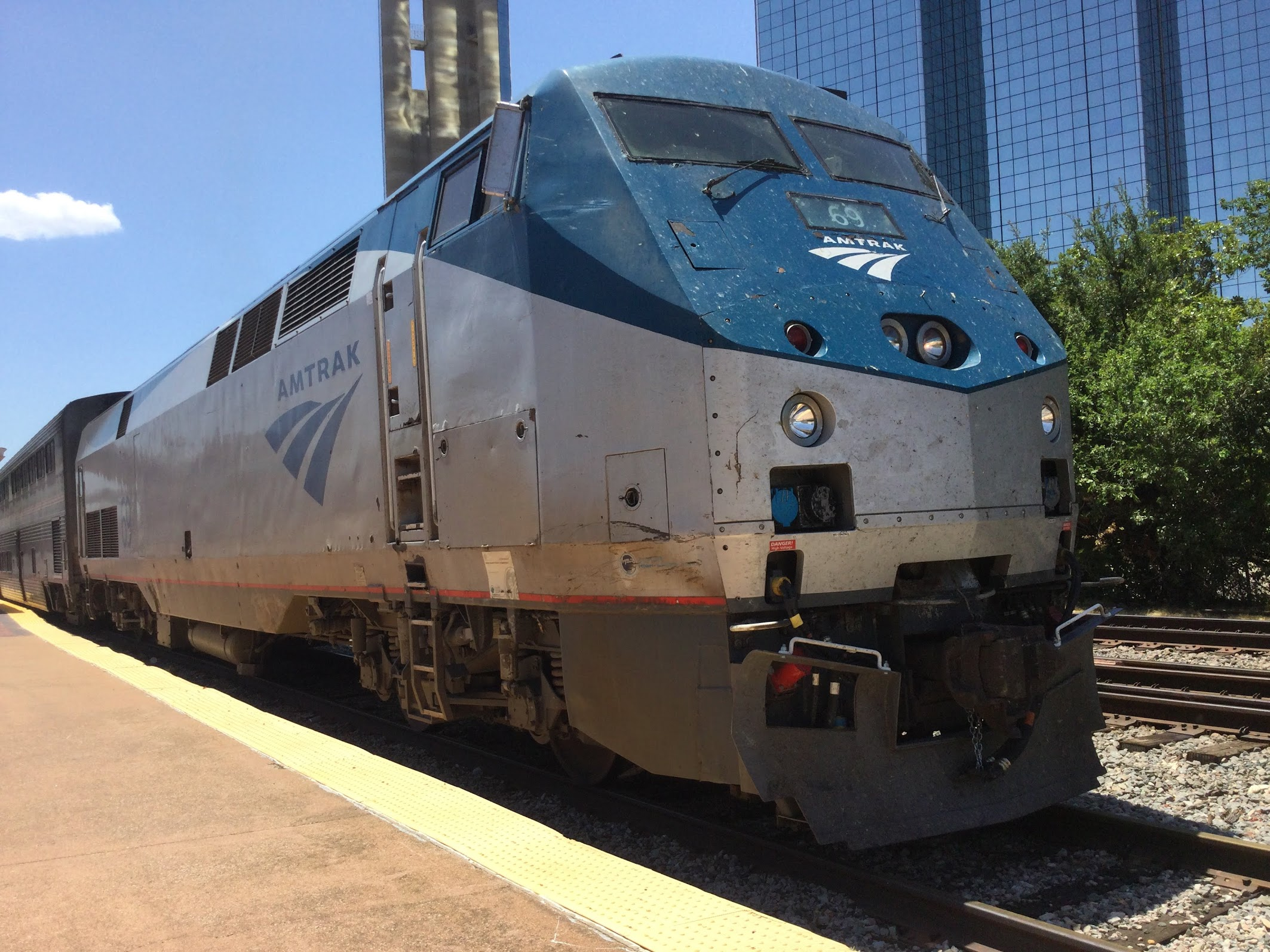
Amtrak P42DC #69 leading Texas Eagle #421 in Dallas Union Station

As of March 2025, the typical consist of the Texas Eagle includes:

- 1 GE Genesis/Siemens ALC-42 locomotive
- 1 Superliner transition sleeper
- 1 Superliner sleeping car
- 1 Superliner diner
- 1 Superliner Sightseer Lounge car
- 1 Superliner coach-baggage car
- 1 Superliner coach

Three times per week, one coach and one sleeping car operate between Los Angeles and Chicago on the combined Sunset Limited and Texas Eagle as trains 421/422. Additionally, an extra Superliner coach operates as trains 321/322 to supplement capacity between Chicago and St. Louis. The Sightseer Lounge was removed from the train in October 2020 in response to reduced demand during the COVID-19 pandemic but was restored in March 2025.

Amtrak plans to replace the P42DCs with modern Siemens ALC-42 locomotives by 2027, and the Superliner cars with new long-distance cars by 2032.
