= Texarkana Union Station =

Historic train station on the Arkansas-Texas border, USA

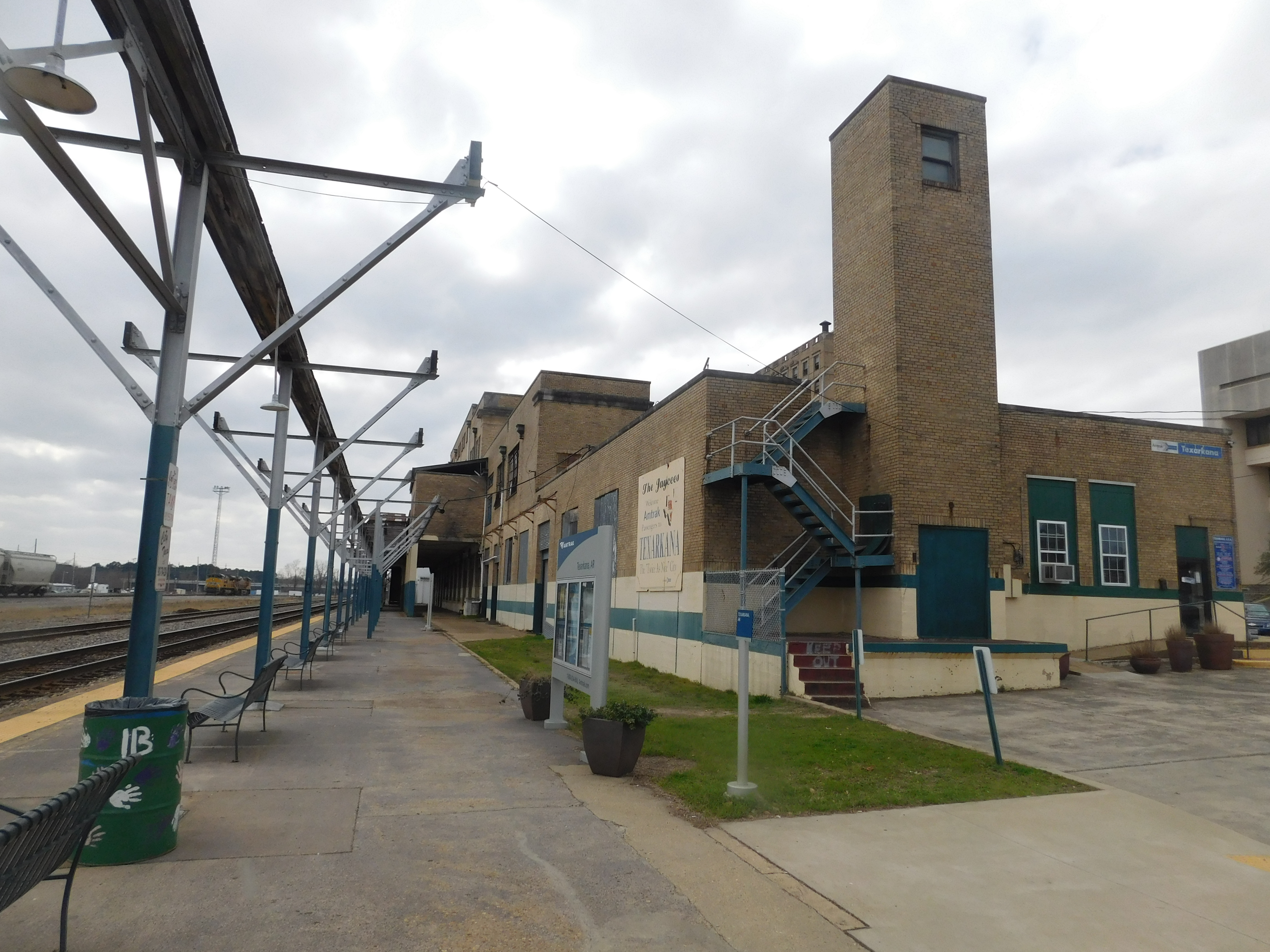
- Texarkana station platform in February 2017 for Amtrak. The union station is on the right.

General information
- Location: 100 East Front Street; Texarkana, Arkansas; United States
- Owner: Jeff Sandefur
- Platforms: 1 side platform
- Tracks: 2
- Connections: Texarkana Urban Transit District

Construction
- Parking: Yes
- Cycle facilities: Yes
- Accessible: Yes

Other information
- Station code: Amtrak: TXA

History
- Opened: 1930

Passengers
- FY 2025: 7,037 (Amtrak)

Services
Preceding station	Amtrak	Following station
Marshall toward Los Angeles or San Antonio	Texas Eagle	Hope toward Chicago
Former services
Preceding station	Amtrak	Following station
Marshall toward Laredo or Houston	Inter-American	Malvern toward Chicago
Preceding station	Kansas City Southern Railway	Following station
Ogden toward Kansas City	Main Line	Draper toward Port Arthur
Preceding station	Missouri Pacific Railroad	Following station
Terminus	Texarkana – St. Louis	Homan toward St. Louis
Preceding station	St. Louis Southwestern Railway	Following station
Redwater toward Gatesville	Main Line	Genoa toward St. Louis
- Texarkana Union Station
- U.S. National Register of Historic Places
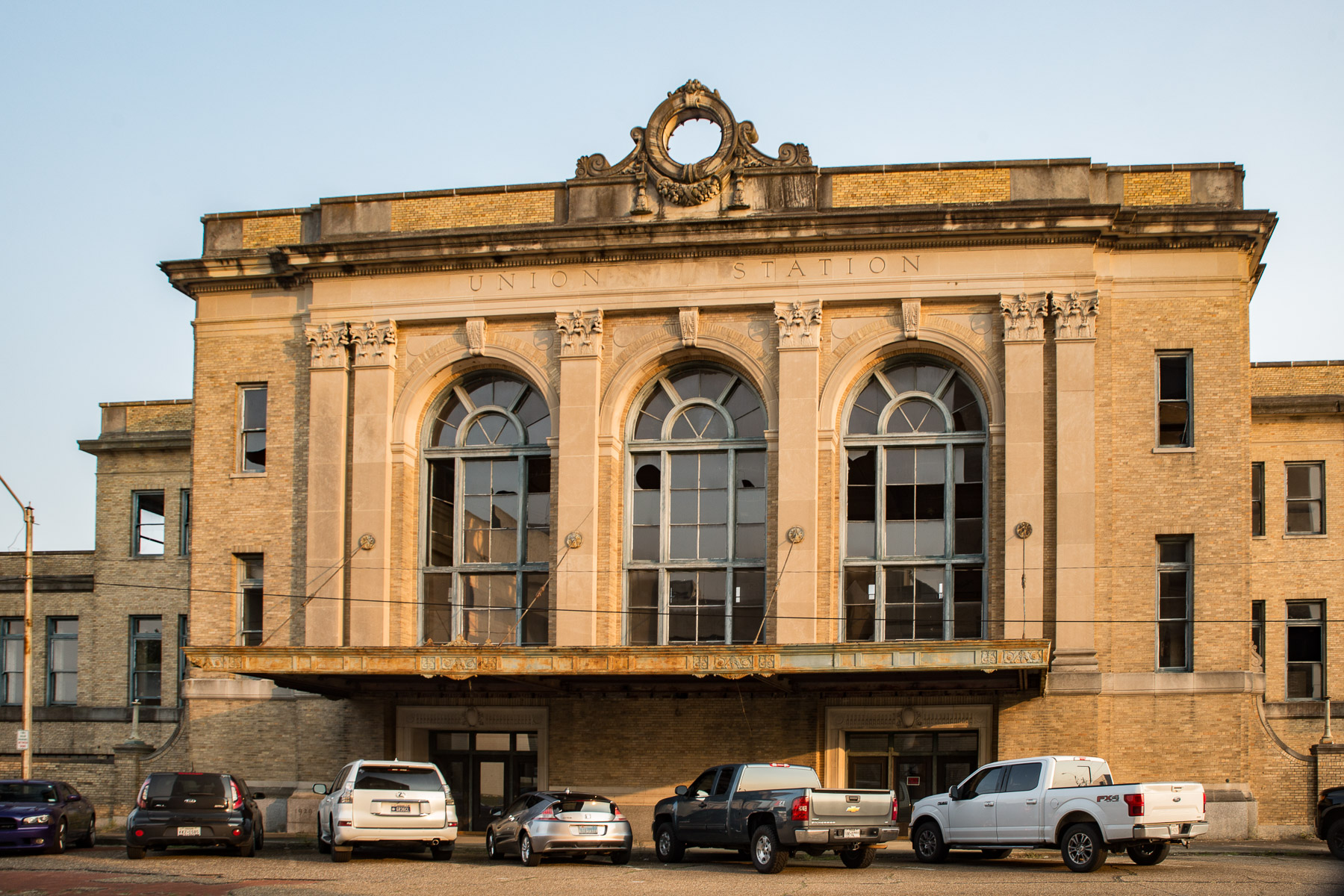
- Location: State Line and Front St., Texarkana, Texas
- Coordinates: 33°25′12″N 94°2′33″W
- Area: less than one acre
- Built: 1928
- Architect: E.M. Tucker, A.B. Butterworth
- Architectural style: Renaissance
- MPS: Historic Railroad Depots of Arkansas MPS
- NRHP reference No.: 78000611
- Added to NRHP: November 19, 1978
Location

Texarkana Union Station is a historic train station in the Texarkana metropolitan area serving Amtrak, the United States' national passenger rail system. The Arkansas-Texas border bisects the structure; the eastern part, including the waiting room and ticket office, are in Texarkana, Arkansas, but the western part is in Texarkana, Texas, meaning stopped trains span both states. The station was built in 1928 and was added to the U.S. National Register of Historic Places in 1978. Today it is the second busiest Amtrak station in Arkansas.

== History ==
Texarkana Union Station was constructed and operated by Union Station Trust, a subsidiary organization created as a joint effort between the Missouri-Pacific, Texas & Pacific, Cotton Belt and Kansas City Southern railroads. E. M. Tucker, chief architect for Missouri Pacific, designed the building with a track layout and overhead concourse reminiscent of the style he had used when rebuilding Little Rock Union Depot after a 1921 fire.

The present structure replaced an earlier Texarkana station on the same site, and was opened for business on April 17, 1930, with a large celebration and dedication held on May 12, 1930, according to Missouri Pacific Lines Magazine, June 1930. The station and the federal courthouse anchor the south and north ends of State Line Avenue, the dividing line between Arkansas and Texas. In 1876, Congress mandated that the Texarkana railroad station would straddle the state line, and the building has entrances and exits into both states. Missouri Pacific and Texas and Pacific, the two carriers with the most passenger trains serving Texarkana Union Station, were able to operate through the facility without a backup move. Kansas City Southern and Cotton Belt passenger trains both made back-up moves to access the station.

Provisions were made in the original station design for a restaurant, but as a result of the Great Depression, the only food service was provided by a snack bar and news stand.

The station was listed on the National Register of Historic Places in 1978.

In April 2023, the Arkansas-side Board of Directors approved $200,000 toward purchasing and redeveloping the station.

== Filming ==
In 1976, the station was used for multiple locations in Charles B. Pierce's movie, The Town That Dreaded Sundown.

== Named trains serving Texarkana Union Station ==
The following are notable cases of trains making stop in past years at Union Station:

- Missouri Pacific Railroad and Texas and Pacific Railway
  - Sunshine Special
  - Texas Eagle
  - Texan
  - Westerner
- Kansas City Southern
  - Flying Crow
  - Southern Belle
- Cotton Belt
  - Lone Star
  - Morning Star
- Amtrak
  - Inter-American
  - Texas Eagle (originally Eagle; only one currently in service)

== Mail and express service ==
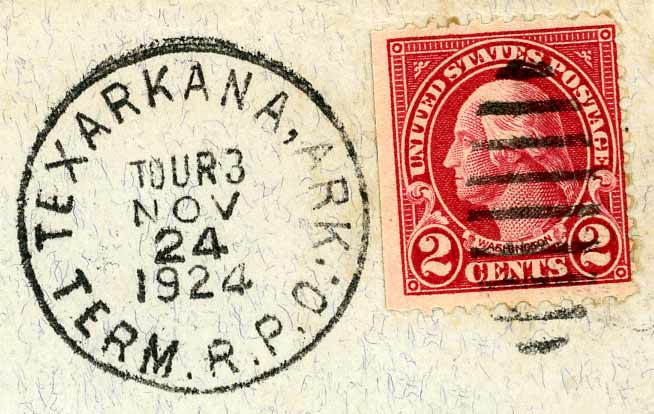
Postal cancellation applied to letters worked by the Texarkana, Arkansas, Terminal RPO in November 1924.

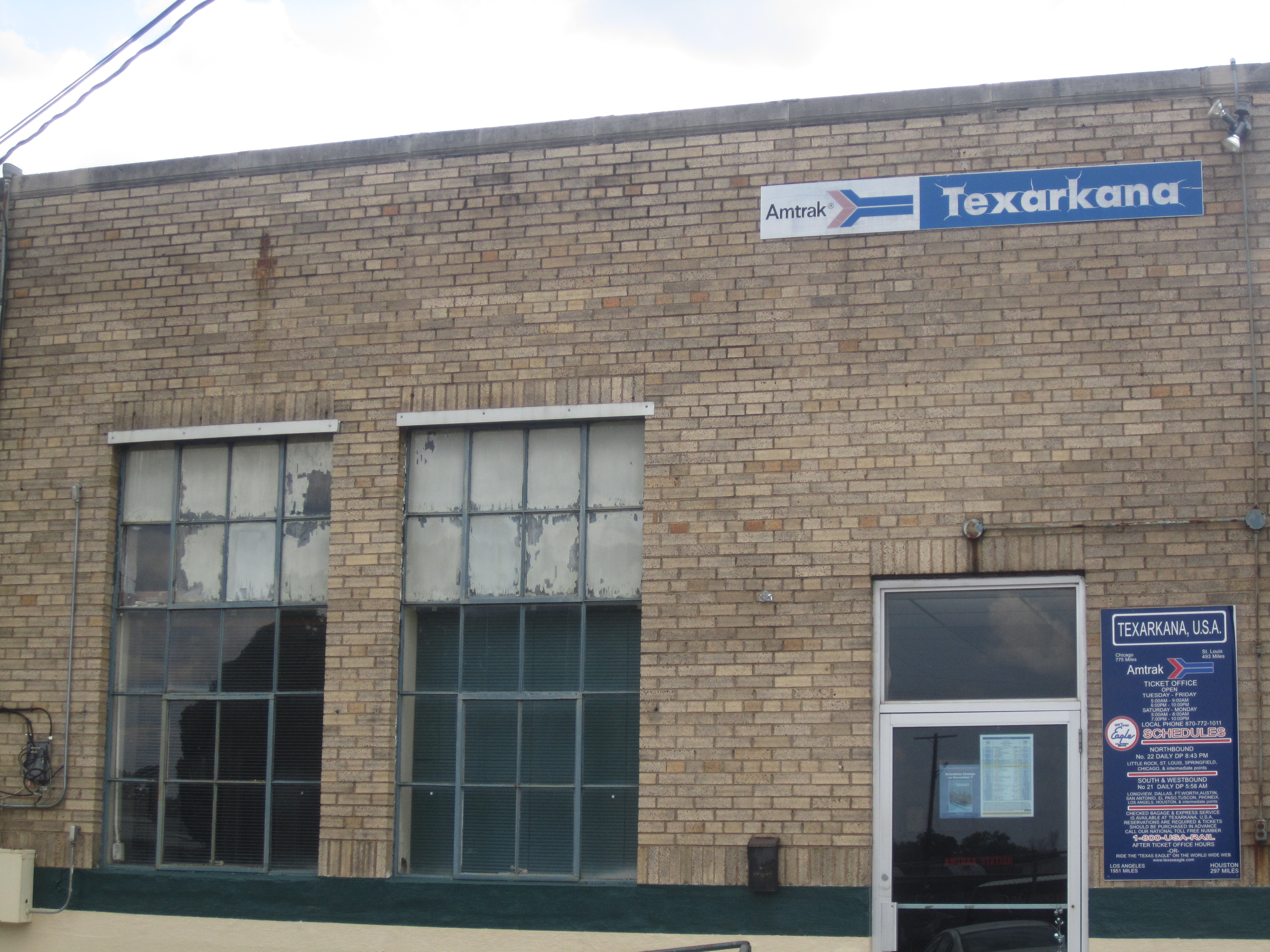
Old Amtrak sign at the side entrance of Texarkana Union Station on the southwest corner of Front and Pine Streets in Arkansas.

During the heyday of private railroad passenger train service, Texarkana served as a major distribution point for mail and express, and a large Terminal Railway Post Office was located in and adjacent to the station. In addition, express cars originating at such distant points as New York City were routed to Texarkana, where the shipments were sorted for transportation in different trains to their final destination.

== See also ==
- List of Amtrak stations
- National Register of Historic Places listings in Miller County, Arkansas
- National Register of Historic Places listings in Bowie County, Texas
