= Houston station (Texas) =

Train station in Houston, Texas, US

Houston, TX
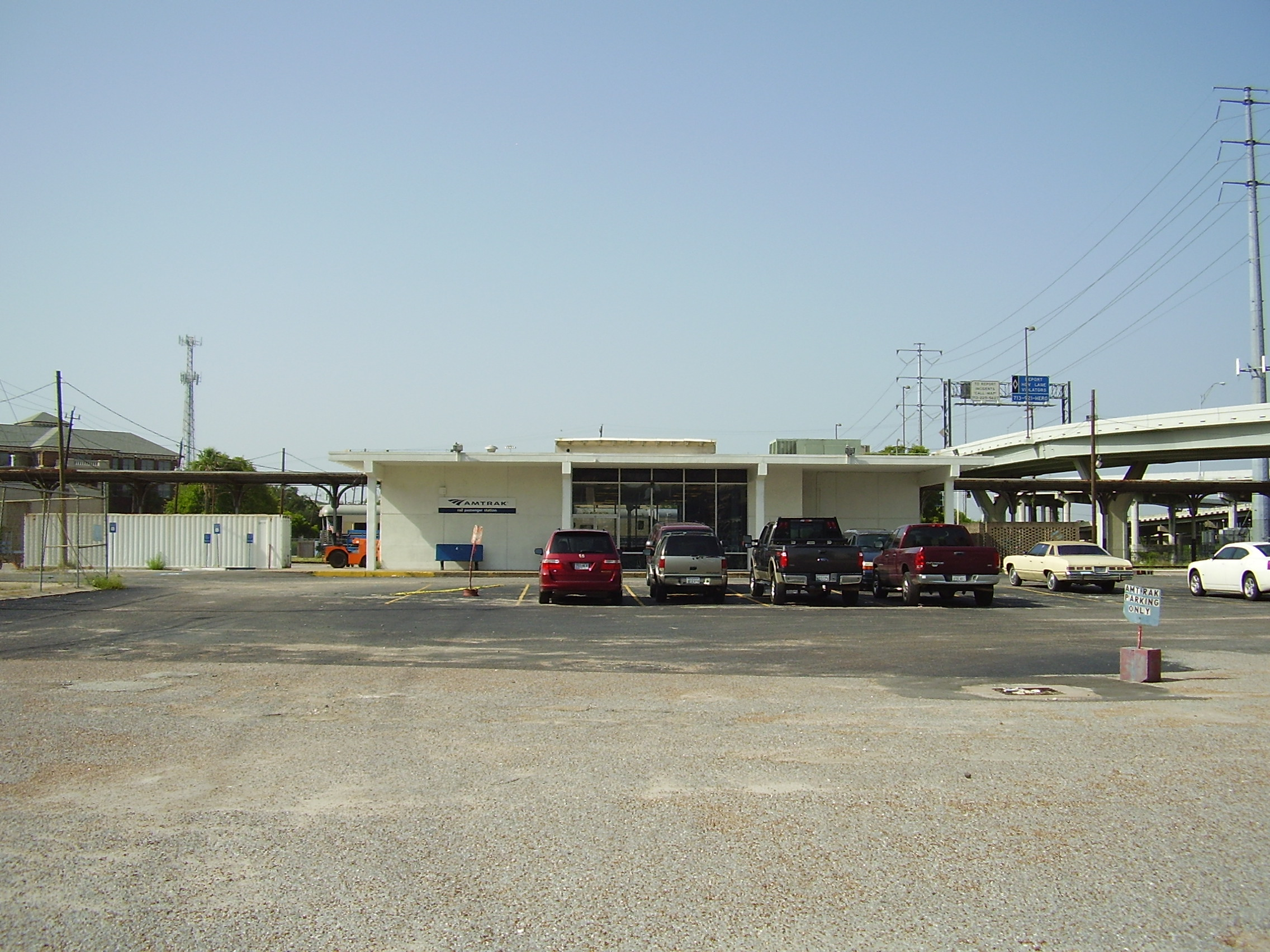

General information
- Location: 902 Washington Avenue; Houston, Texas; United States
- Coordinates: 29.76727°N 95.36754°W
- Owner: Union Pacific Railroad
- Line: UP Houston Subdivision
- Platforms: 1 side platform, 1 island platform
- Tracks: 2
- Connections: Amtrak Thruway; Greyhound Lines; METRO Bus

Construction
- Parking: Yes
- Accessible: Yes

Other information
- Station code: Amtrak: HOS

History
- Opened: 1959

Passengers
- FY 2025: 22,921 (Amtrak)

Services
Preceding station	Amtrak	Following station
San Antonio toward Los Angeles	Sunset Limited	Beaumont toward New Orleans
Former services
Preceding station	Amtrak	Following station
Rosenberg toward Chicago	Lone Star Ended 1979	Terminus
Rosenberg toward Chicago	Inter-American Ended 1981	Terminus
College Station toward Chicago	Texas Eagle Until 1995	Terminus
Preceding station	Southern Pacific Railroad	Following station
Rosenberg toward Los Angeles	Sunset Route	Beaumont toward New Orleans
Location

Houston station is an Amtrak intercity train station in Houston, Texas. It was built in 1959 by the Southern Pacific Railroad to replace the nearby Grand Central Station.

== History ==
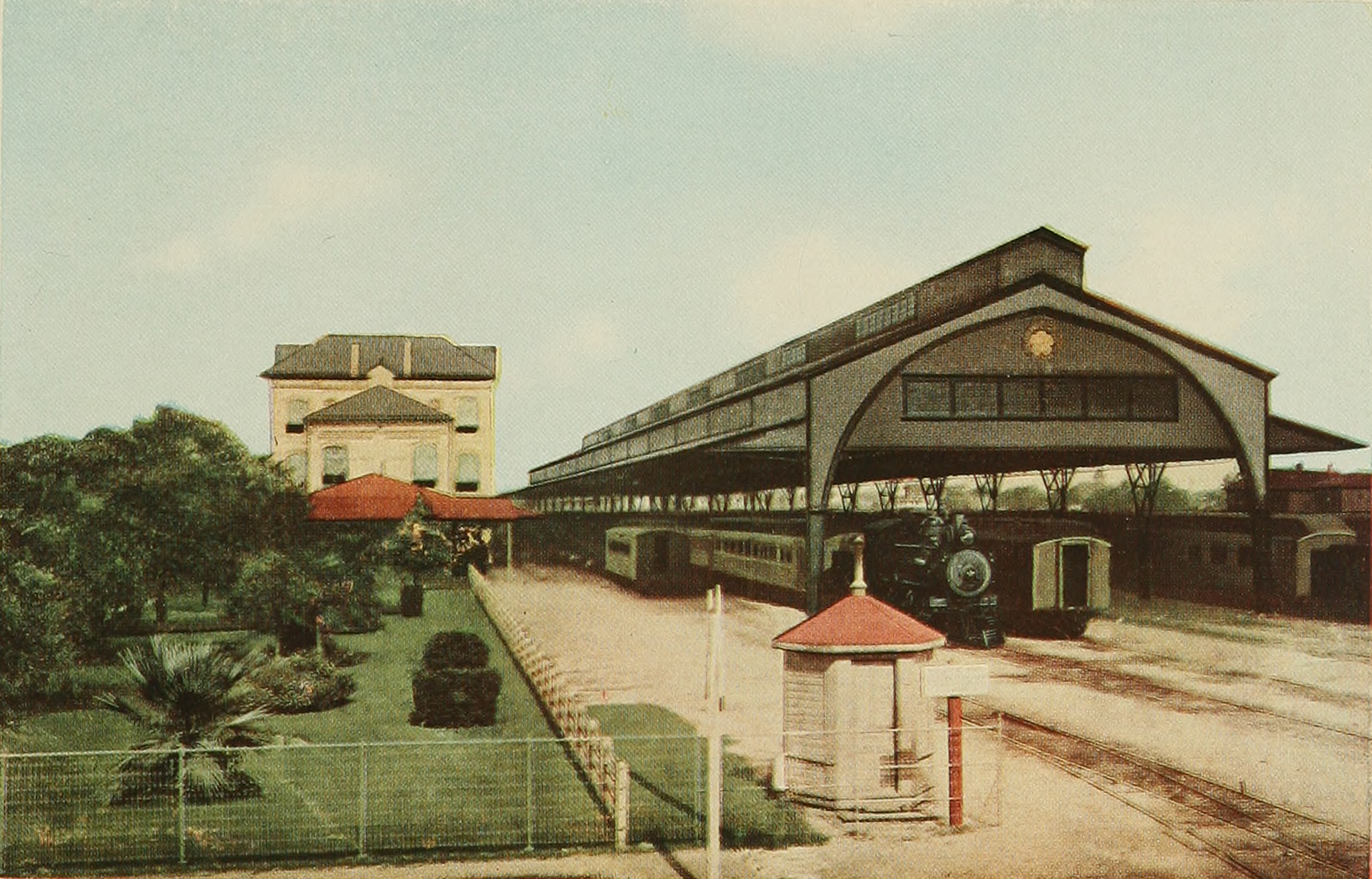
1913 postcard of Grand Central Station

The present Houston station, which opened on October 26, 1959, was built by the Southern Pacific Railroad to replace Grand Central Station, which was just east of the present station. That station operated from September 1, 1934 until the property was sold to the U.S. Government in 1959 to become the site of the Houston main post office. Grand Central Station had replaced the original Houston & Texas Central depot of 1886. When Amtrak was created it was one of two stations in Houston that served Amtrak trains, the other being Union Station, now part of Daikin Park. All Amtrak trains moved to Southern Pacific Station by the end of July 1974, and all trains were canceled or rerouted out of Houston except the Sunset Limited. The station continued to be owned and operated by the Southern Pacific Railroad after the creation of Amtrak, and it has been owned and operated by the Union Pacific Railroad, who bought out Southern Pacific.

A third station used by the Missouri–Kansas–Texas Railroad was at the top of the Main Street viaduct, next to the campus of the University of Houston–Downtown (UHD). It was no longer an active passenger station by the end of 1958; it never served Amtrak and was demolished, save for a section of platform under the Main Street viaduct.

In the 2000s, the station was proposed to be replaced by the Houston Intermodal Transit Center, just north of downtown, on the Union Pacific main line. The project was cancelled in 2010.
