= San Antonio station (Texas) =

Amtrak station in San Antonio, Texas

San Antonio, TX
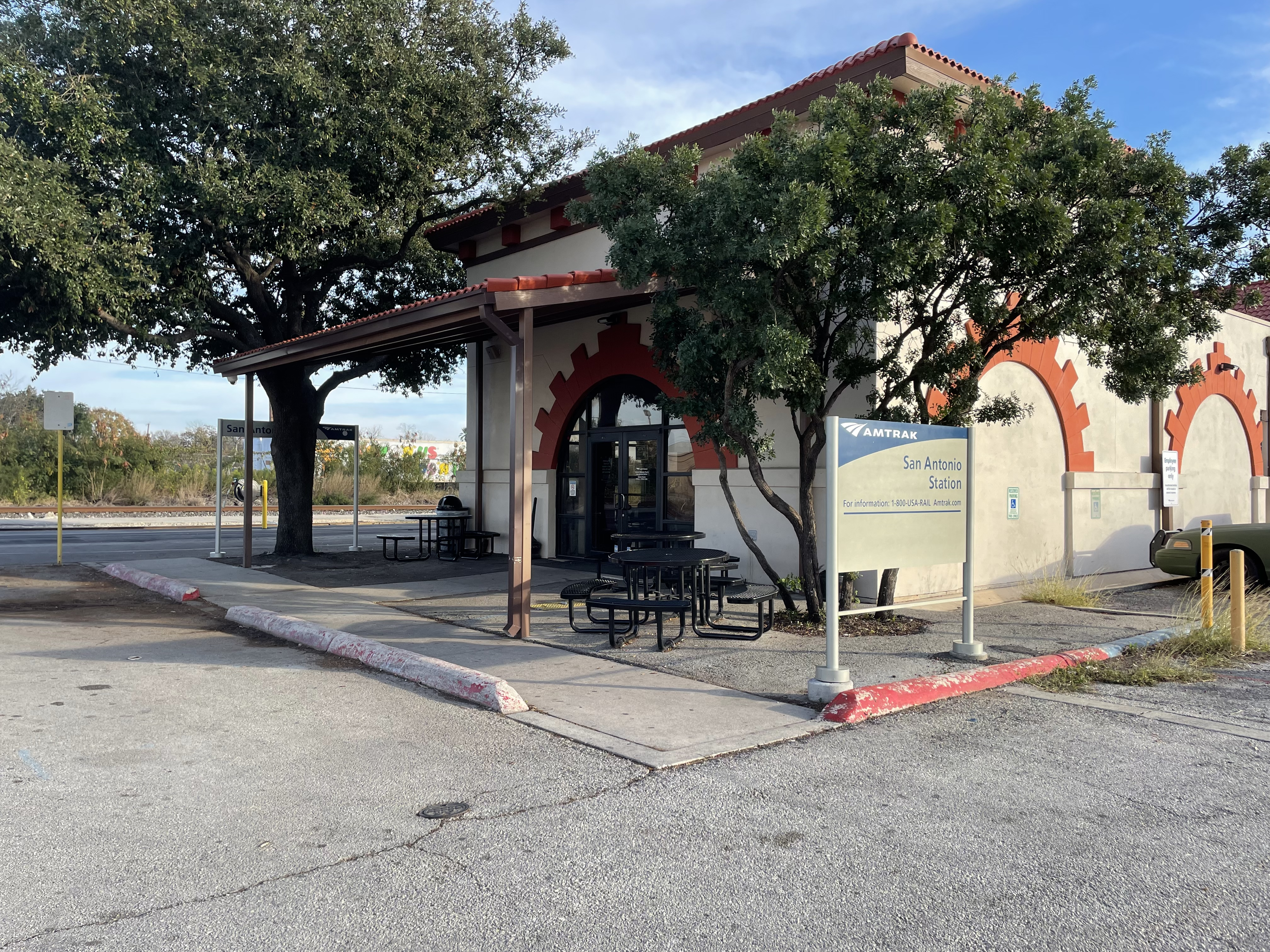

General information
- Location: 350 Hoefgen Street; San Antonio, Texas; United States
- Coordinates: 29°25′12″N 98°28′40″W
- Owner: Amtrak
- Line: UP Del Rio Subdivision
- Platforms: 1 side & 1 island platform
- Tracks: 2
- Connections: Amtrak Thruway

Construction
- Parking: Yes
- Cycle facilities: Yes
- Accessible: Yes

Other information
- Station code: Amtrak: SAS

History
- Opened: 1998

Passengers
- FY 2025: 63,676 (Amtrak)

Services
Preceding station	Amtrak	Following station
Del Rio toward Los Angeles	Sunset Limited	Houston toward New Orleans
Del Rio toward Los Angeles	Texas Eagle	San Marcos toward Chicago
Former services
Preceding station	Amtrak	Following station
Laredo Terminus	Inter-American	San Marcos toward Chicago
Preceding station	Southern Pacific Railroad	Following station
Spofford toward Los Angeles	Sunset Route	Flatonia toward New Orleans
Preceding station	N de M	Following station
Von Ormy toward Buenavista	Águila Azteca Pre-1969	Terminus
- Southern Pacific Railroad Passenger Station
- U.S. National Register of Historic Places
- U.S. Historic district – Contributing property
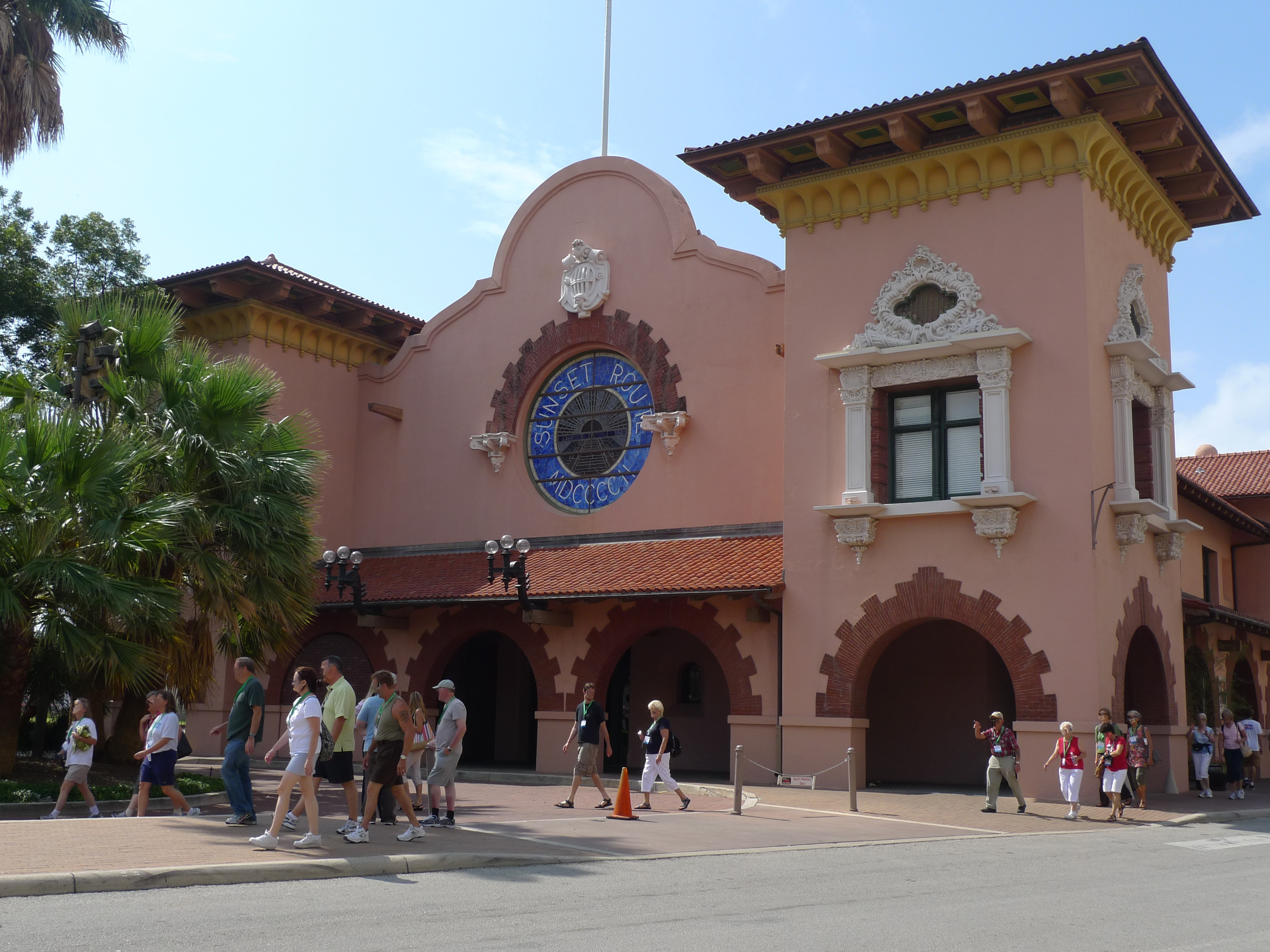

- Location within Texas Location within the United States
- Built: 1902
- Architect: Daniel J. Patterson
- Architectural style: Spanish Mission
- Part of: Southern Pacific Depot Historic District (ID79002917)
- NRHP reference No.: 75001955

Significant dates
- Added to NRHP: May 29, 1975
- Designated CP: February 1, 1979
Location

San Antonio station is an Amtrak railroad station located on the eastern portion of Downtown San Antonio, in San Antonio, Texas.

San Antonio station hosts two long-distance Amtrak services: the tri-weekly Sunset Limited and the daily Texas Eagle. Four days a week, San Antonio is the southern terminus of the Texas Eagle, which originates in Chicago. The Texas Eagle joins with the Sunset Limited three days a week, continuing westbound to Los Angeles. It is the second busiest Amtrak station in Texas, behind Fort Worth Central Station.

== History ==
Amtrak previously used the historic Southern Pacific Railroad (SP) Station, also known as Sunset Station. It was designed by SP's architect Daniel J. Patterson in the Spanish Mission Revival style, and built in 1902 by the SP. The train station was listed on the National Register of Historic Places in 1975.

Amtrak moved operations in 1998 to a smaller depot that was built adjacent to the older Sunset Station. Under its owner, VIA Metropolitan Transit, the historic Sunset Station underwent an extensive restoration and now serves as an entertainment complex. The station also neighbors the Alamodome and the Robert Thompson Transit Station.

A preserved 2-8-2 Baldwin "Mikado" steam locomotive, Southern Pacific No. 794 was donated to the City of San Antonio at the end of its service life in 1956, and placed on static display at nearby Maverick Park for decades before being relocated to the station in January 1999. Since September 2008, it has been under the care of volunteers from the San Antonio Railroad Heritage Museum.

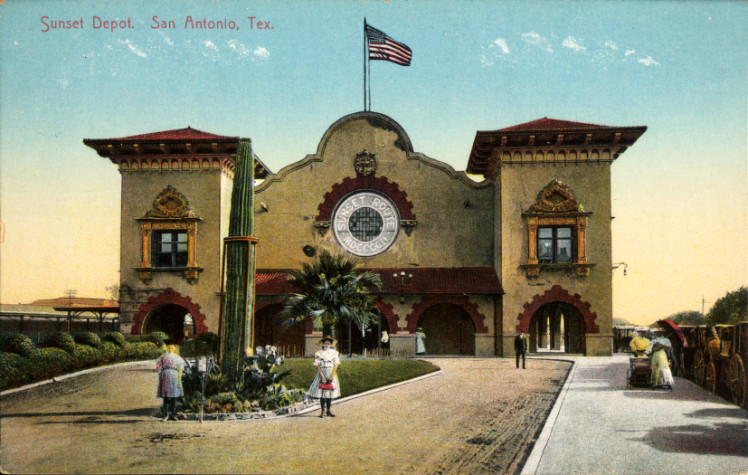
Postcard view of the 1902-built Sunset Station, the first San Antonio station.

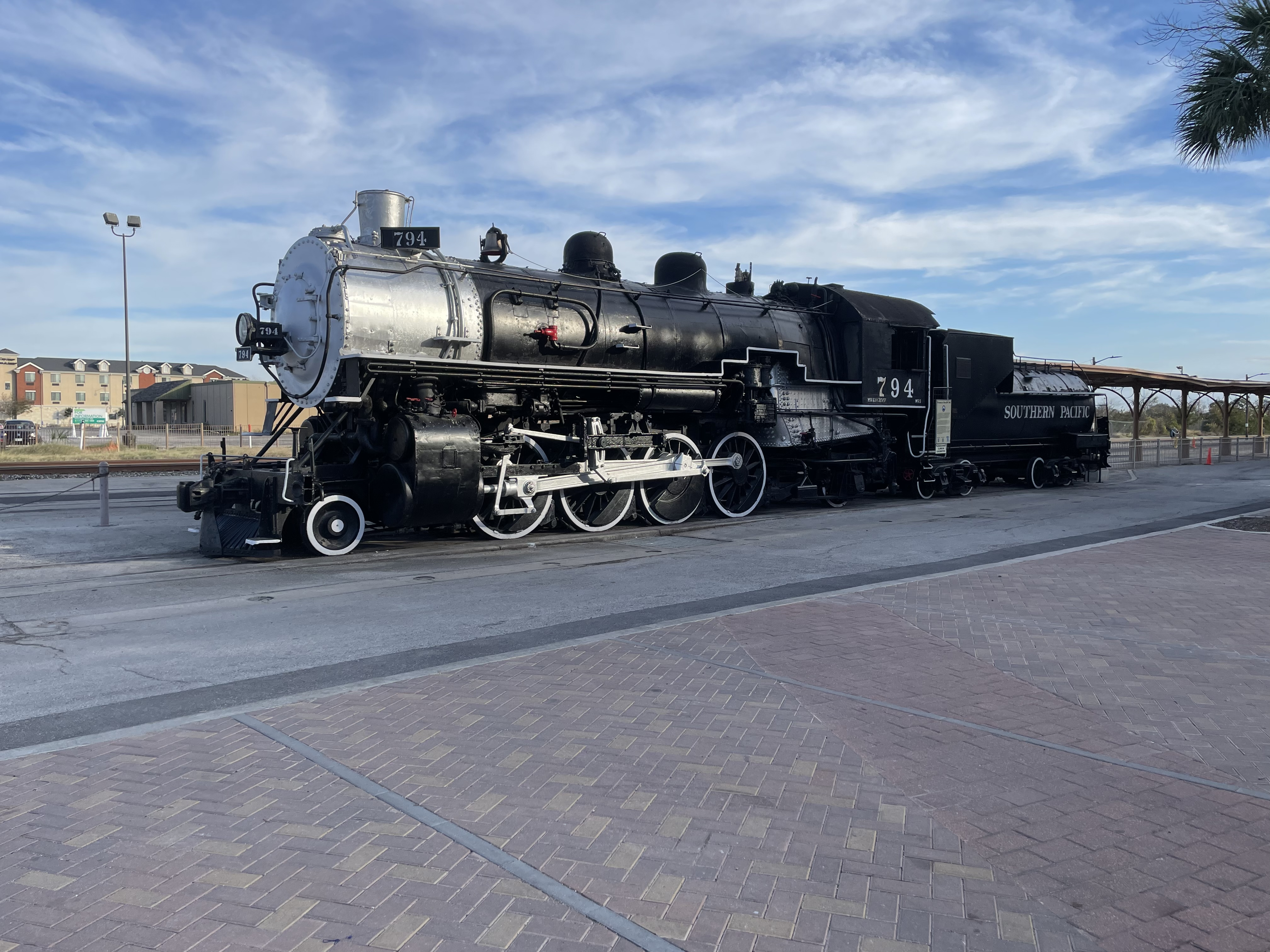
Southern Pacific 794 on static display at the station.
