= Inter-American (train) =

Former named American passenger train

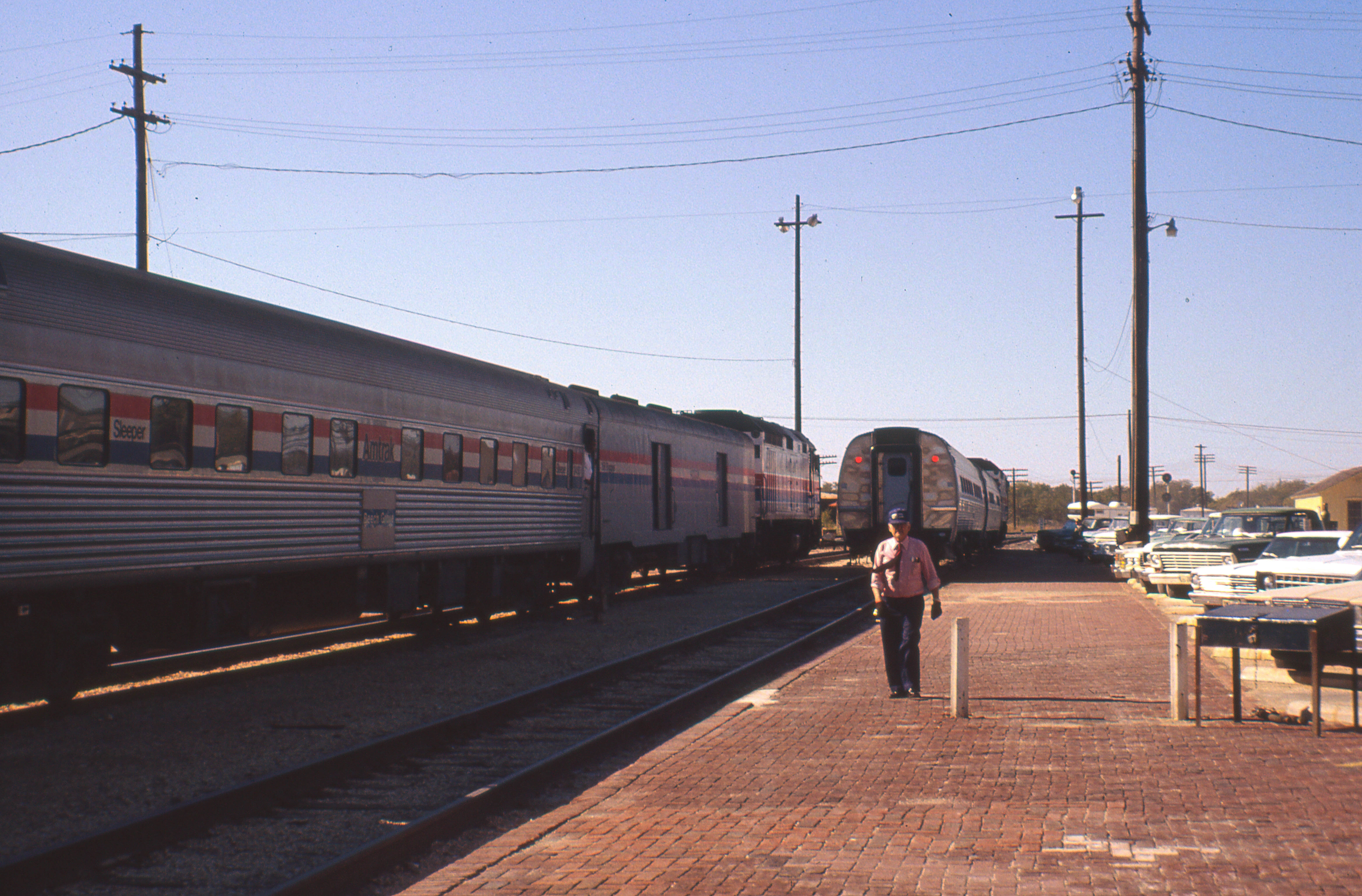
- The Laredo and Houston sections assembling in Temple in the early 1980s.

Overview
- Service type: Inter-city rail
- Status: Discontinued
- Locale: Midwestern United States
- Predecessor: Texas Eagle (MP train)
- First service: January 27, 1973
- Last service: October 1, 1981
- Successor: Texas Eagle
- Former operator: Amtrak

Route
- Termini: Chicago, Illinois; Laredo, Texas; Houston, Texas
- Stops: 27
- Distance travelled: 1,452 mi (2,337 km) (Chicago–Laredo); 1,333 mi (2,145 km) (Chicago–Houston)
- Service frequency: Daily
- Train numbers: 21, 22 (Chicago–Laredo); 23, 24 (Temple–Houston)

On-board services
- Sleeping arrangements: Roomettes and bedrooms
- Catering facilities: Cafe-lounge

Technical
- Track gauge: 4 ft 8 1/2 in (1,435 mm)
- Track owners: Illinois Central Gulf; Missouri Pacific Railroad; MKT Railroad; ATSF Railway

The Inter-American was a passenger train operated by Amtrak between Chicago and Laredo, Texas. Its route changed over time and was eventually replaced by the Texas Eagle.

== History ==
The Inter-American was established on January 27, 1973, with thrice-weekly service between Laredo and Fort Worth. At Fort Worth, travelers could connect with the Texas Chief, but doing so required an overnight layover. At Laredo, it was possible to cross the border to Nuevo Laredo, Mexico, and connect with Ferrocarriles Nacionales de México ("N de M") trains to points in Mexico.

In March 1974, the train was extended from Fort Worth to St. Louis via Dallas, following the route of the former Missouri Pacific Texas Eagle. From St. Louis, passengers could connect to Chicago.

In October 1976, Amtrak extended the Inter-American to Chicago. It operated daily between Chicago and St. Louis, but continued as thrice-weekly between St. Louis and Laredo.

On October 31, 1978, a St. Louis–Chicago Inter-American became the last train to serve Union Station in St. Louis.

In October 1979, budget cuts forced Amtrak to combine the Inter-American with the Chicago-Houston Lone Star (formerly the Texas Chief). The merged train retained the Inter-American name, changed from thrice-weekly to daily, and added a Houston section which split in Temple.

On October 1, 1981, Amtrak, once again forced to make service cuts, truncated the Inter-American to San Antonio and eliminated the Houston section. The new service was named the Eagle, and still runs today as the Texas Eagle.

== See also ==
- Texas Eagle
