= Longview station =

Train station in Longview, Texas

Longview, TX
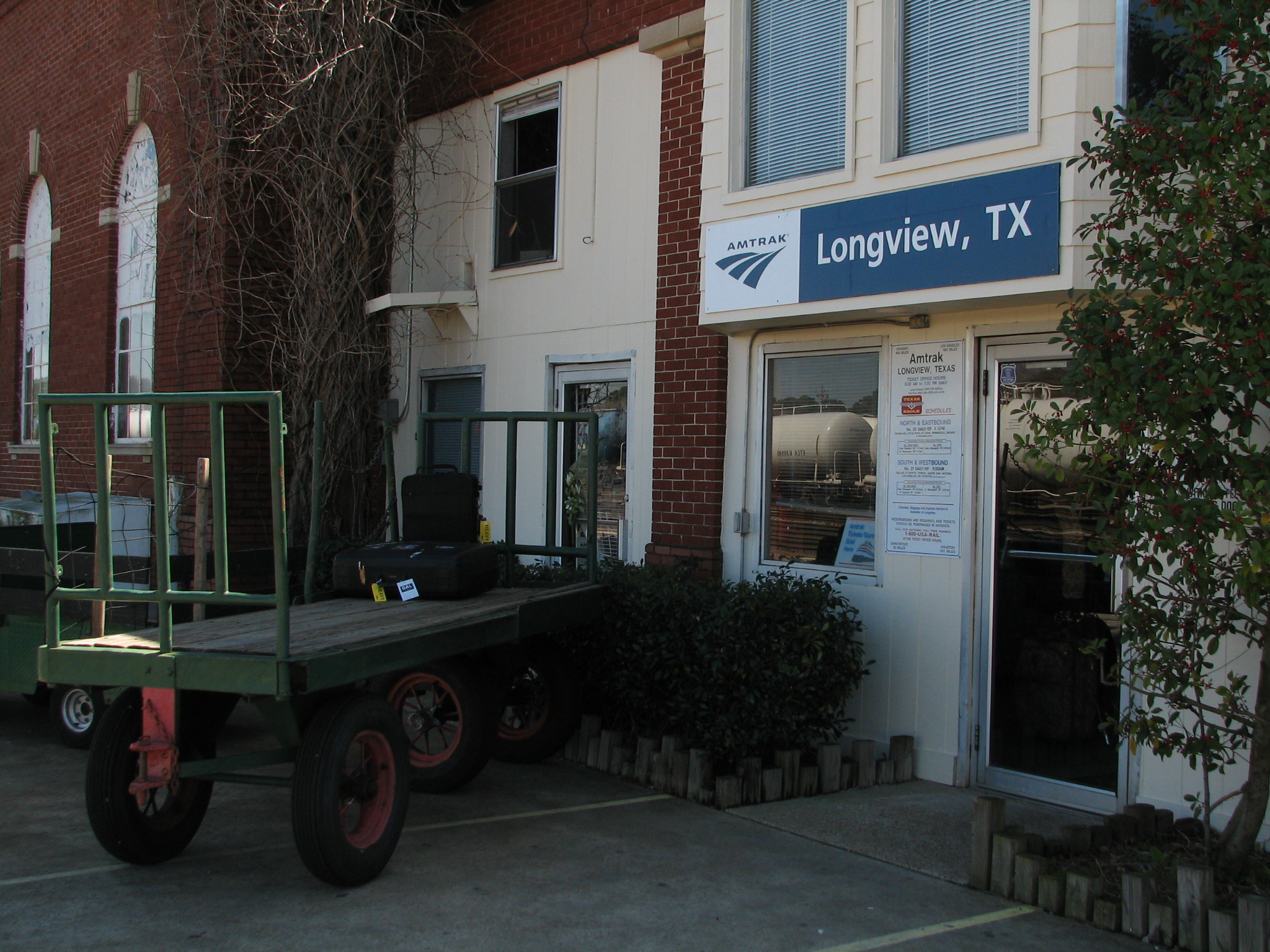
- A baggage cart outside Longview in 2008.

General information
- Location: 905 Pacific Avenue; Longview, Texas; United States
- Coordinates: 32°29′39″N 94°43′40″W
- Owner: City of Longview
- Line: Union Pacific Railroad
- Platforms: 1 side platform
- Tracks: 2
- Connections: Amtrak Thruway

Other information
- Station code: Amtrak: LVW

History
- Opened: 1940

Passengers
- FY 2025: 27,858 (Amtrak)

Services
Preceding station	Amtrak	Following station
Mineola toward Los Angeles or San Antonio	Texas Eagle	Marshall toward Chicago
Former services
Preceding station	Amtrak	Following station
Dallas toward Laredo or Houston	Inter-American	Marshall toward Chicago
Preceding station	Missouri Pacific Railroad	Following station
Greggton toward El Paso	Texas and Pacific Railway Main Line	Hallsville toward New Orleans
Kilgore toward Galveston	Galveston – Longview	Terminus
Proposed services
Preceding station	Amtrak	Following station
Mineola toward Fort Worth	Crescent Proposed Texas Section	Marshall toward New York

Recorded Texas Historic Landmark
- Official name: Longview Train Depot
- Designated: 2014
- Reference no.: 17982
Location

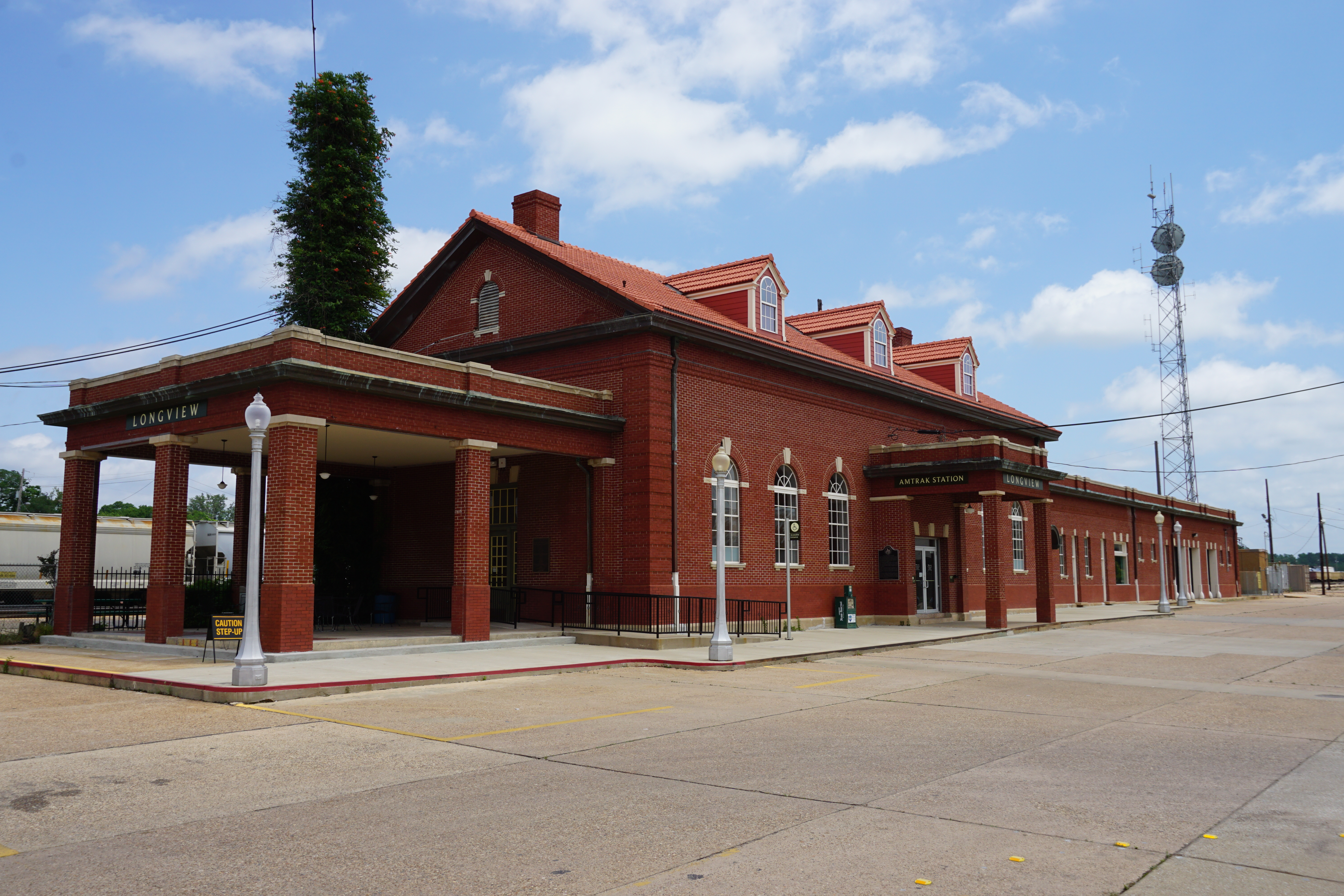
Longview station

Longview station is a train station in Longview, Texas, United States. It is served by Amtrak and was originally built by the Texas & Pacific Railway.

The Longview station also serves as the train-bus transfer point for passengers destined to two Amtrak Thruway motorcoach routes. One route provides Texas Eagle connecting service to Nacogdoches, Houston and Galveston, Texas; the other route provides connecting nonstop service between Longview and Shreveport, Louisiana.

Opened in 1940, the red brick depot replaced an 1874 structure. Its Colonial Revival style, popular in the early 20th century, includes stylized quoins, brick cornice and grey stone trim used to highlight the coping, keystones and lintels. In its heyday, it ran several Missouri Pacific and Texas & Pacific trains a day, notably those companies' original Texas Eagle (ended, 1971), which west and south of Longview split into three different sections for different parts of Texas. Until 1963 the Louisiana Eagle went east to Shreveport and New Orleans. A successor night train and a successor day train ran on the route to New Orleans as late as 1968.

In early 2013, the city broke ground on a $2.2 million project to transform the depot into a multimodal transportation center. During the renovation, workers installed new dormers and the open-air waiting room was recreated. The project was largely funded through a Transportation Enhancement grant from the Federal Highway Administration, matched by city funds.

== See also ==
- Recorded Texas Historic Landmarks in Gregg County
