= Texas and Pacific Railroad Depot =

Texas and Pacific Railroad Depot may refer to:

- Texas and Pacific Railroad Depot (Bunkie, Louisiana), listed on the National Register of Historic Places in Avoyelles Parish
- Texas and Pacific Railroad Depot (Natchitoches, Louisiana), listed on the National Register of Historic Places in Natchitoches Parish
- Texas and Pacific Railroad Depot (Abilene, Texas)
- Texas and Pacific Railroad Depot (Bonham, Texas), listed on the National Register of Historic Places in Fannin County
- T&P Station, a Trinity Railway Express (commuter rail) station in Fort Worth, Texas, listed on the National Register of Historic Places in Tarrant County
- Texas and Pacific Railroad Depot (Marshall, Texas), an operational Amtrak station and Texas & Pacific Railway Museum, which is part of the Ginocchio Historic District on the NRHP in Harrison County
