= Mineola station (Texas) =

Mineola, TX
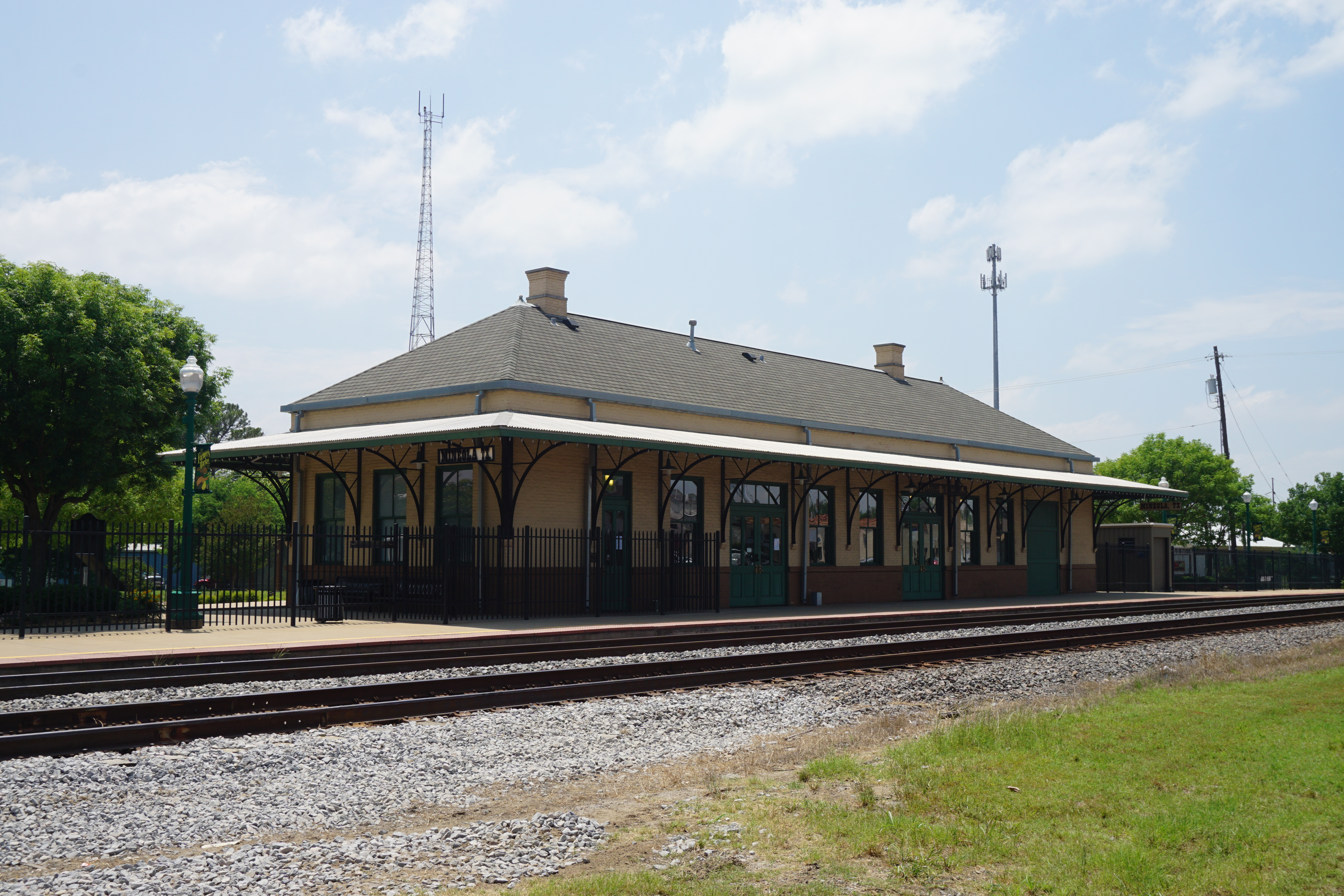
- Mineola station in May 2018

General information
- Location: 115 East Front Street; Mineola, Texas; United States
- Coordinates: 32.66197°N 95.4891°W
- Owner: City of Mineola (station and parking lot); Union Pacific Railroad (track and platform)
- Line: Union Pacific Railroad
- Platforms: 1 side platform
- Tracks: 2

Other information
- Station code: Amtrak: MIN

History
- Opened: 1906; April 28, 1996
- Closed: April 30, 1971
- Rebuilt: June 10, 2006

Passengers
- FY 2025: 7,422 (Amtrak)

Services
Preceding station	Amtrak	Following station
Dallas toward Los Angeles or San Antonio	Texas Eagle	Longview toward Chicago
Former services
Preceding station	Missouri Pacific Railroad	Following station
West Mineola toward El Paso	Texas and Pacific Railway Main Line	Hoard toward New Orleans
Terminus	Mineola – Troup	Lindale toward Troup
Proposed services
Preceding station	Amtrak	Following station
Dallas toward Fort Worth	Crescent Proposed Texas Section	Longview toward New York
Location

Mineola station is a station in Mineola, Texas, United States, currently served by Amtrak's Texas Eagle. The station was originally built in 1906 by the Texas & Pacific Railway and also used by the Missouri Pacific Railroad.

== History ==
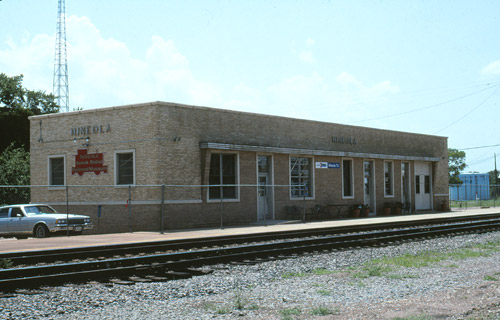
Mineola station in October 1996, shortly after reopening

The Missouri-Pacific Railroad built the station in 1906. In 1951, as "modernization", the hipped roof was removed and decoration stripped from the station, leaving a rectangular brick building.

The Missouri-Pacific Railroad ended service on its Texas Eagle on April 30, 1971, one day before Amtrak took over passenger services. In March 1974, Amtrak's Inter-American was extended from Fort Worth to St. Louis, restoring passenger service to the Missouri-Pacific Railroad's main line but without a stop in Mineola. The Inter-American was replaced by the Eagle in 1981, which in turn was renamed as the Texas Eagle in 1988.

On April 14, 1996, Newport station in Arkansas was closed as part of a deal with the Union Pacific Railroad to reopen the stop at Mineola. Trains began stopping at Mineola on April 28. According to Mineola native Willie Brown, the station was reopened as the result of his persistent lobbying of President Bill Clinton. Responding to an Amtrak report that a survey did not reveal anyone wanting to get off in Mineola, Brown reportedly told Clinton: "The reason to stop in Mineola is not to let anybody off. It's to let the people on. It's not that great a place. Look at me! I left!" Amtrak, however, credited "Mineola community leaders" with the successful effort.

In 2005, the city began an $800,000 renovation project, funded primarily by the Texas Department of Transportation, to restore the station to its original appearance. A new angled roof was constructed, signage and landscaping built, and the interior converted for use as a railway museum. The station was rededicated on June 10, 2006.
