= Louisiana Eagle =

Former American passenger train

Overview
- Service type: Inter-city rail
- Status: Discontinued
- Locale: Southwestern United States
- First service: 1949
- Last service: 1963
- Former operator: Texas and Pacific Railway

Route
- Termini: New Orleans, Louisiana; Fort Worth, Texas
- Distance travelled: 547.4 miles (881.0 km)
- Average journey time: Westbound: 13 hrs 20 min; Eastbound: 13 hrs 50 min
- Service frequency: Daily
- Train number: Westbound: 21, Eastbound: 22

On-board services
- Seating arrangements: Reclining Seat Coaches
- Sleeping arrangements: Open sections, roomettes and double bedrooms
- Catering facilities: Dining lounge car

Technical
- Track gauge: 1,435 mm (4 ft 8 1/2 in)

The Louisiana Eagle was a long distance night train operated by the Texas and Pacific Railway that ran from New Orleans to Fort Worth, Texas. The route was distinct in contrast to other routes running west from New Orleans to major Texas cities. It ran northwest-ward from New Orleans to northwest Louisiana and to the major North Texas cities of Dallas and Fort Worth with continuing service to El Paso on the Missouri Pacific's Texas Eagle, whereas other east-west trains from New Orleans into Texas went to the south, to Houston and San Antonio.

The train was #21 westbound, #22 eastbound. It had a daytime counterpart in the Louisiana Daylight (#27, westbound, 28, eastbound). The Missouri Pacific ran successor night and day trains to the Louisiana Eagle and the Louisiana Daylight as late as 1968. By 1969, all that was left was the successor night train, which was shortened to a Marshall, Texas to New Orleans route. By 1970, passenger service was completely discontinued.

== Major stops served ==
- New Orleans, LA (Union Passenger Terminal)
- Addis (for Baton Rouge)
- Alexandria
- Shreveport (Union Station)
- Marshall, TX (T&P station)
- Longview (T&P station)
- Dallas (Union Station)
- Fort Worth (T&P Station)
- via the MP's Texas Eagle:
- Abilene
- Midland
- Odessa
- El Paso (Union Depot)
