= Águila Azteca (train) =

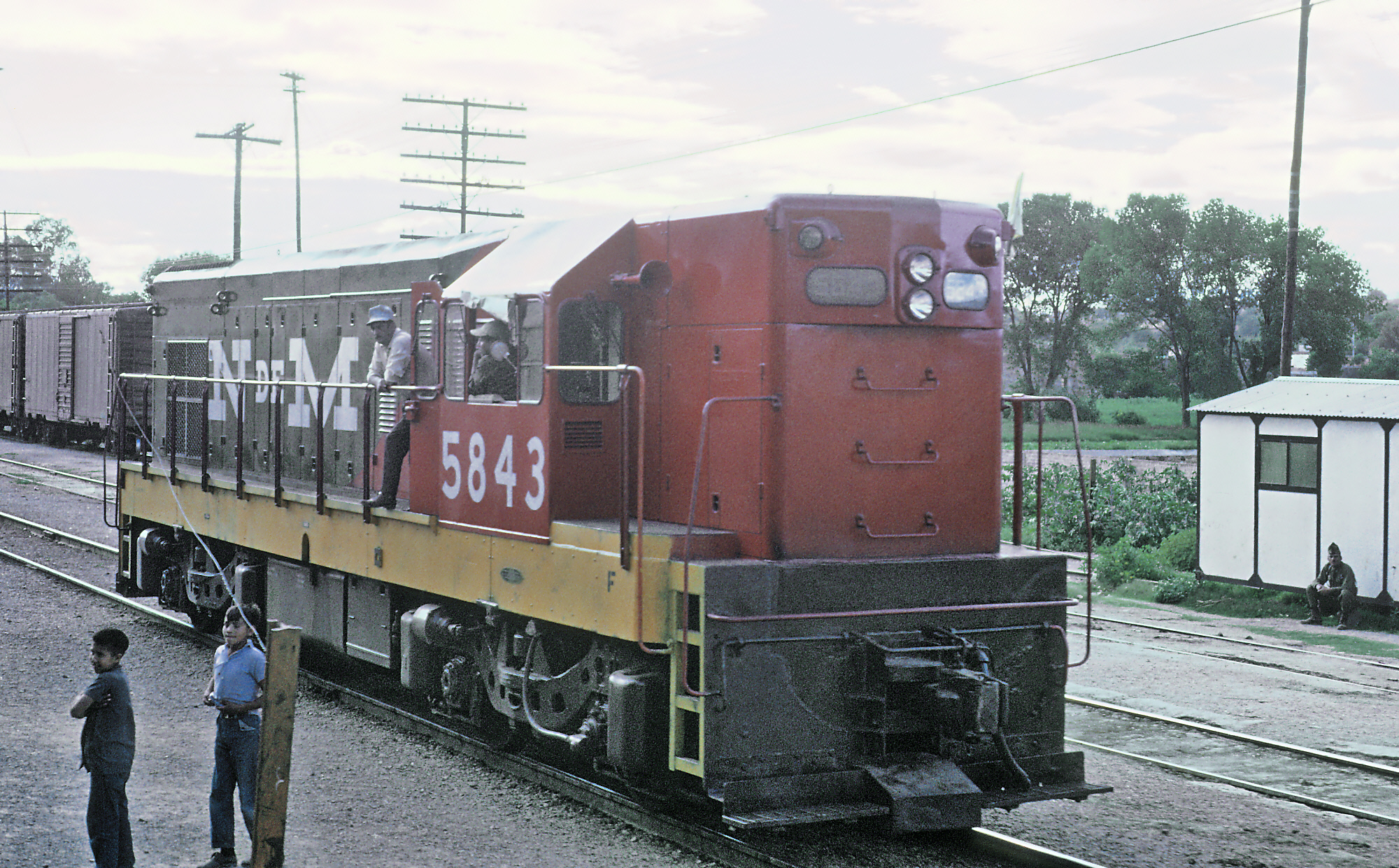
- Locomotive 5843, an EMD G12 owned by NdeM, at Empalme Escobedo in 1966.

Overview
- Service type: Inter-city rail
- Locale: Mexico; United States (pre-1969)
- First service: 1948
- Last service: 1997
- Former operators: Ferrocarriles Nacionales de México; Missouri Pacific Railroad (in the US)

Route
- Termini: Buenavista station, Mexico City; Nuevo Laredo railway station San Antonio, Texas (pre-1969)

Technical
- Track gauge: Standard gauge
- Operating speed: 50 kilometres per hour (31 mph)

The Águila Azteca (Aztec Eagle) was a passenger train between Mexico City and Nuevo Laredo, and formerly to San Antonio station, which was operated by Ferrocarriles Nacionales de México.

This train was the main passenger rail connection between the United States and Mexico, due to its connection with the Missouri Pacific Railroad's Texas Eagle and, later, Amtrak's Inter-American.

During the 1950s, the train had 29 stations in both the United States and Mexico.

== History ==
The route to the United States was owned by the Missouri Pacific, which arrived in San Antonio in 1900. In 1881, the Texas and Pacific Railway had previously completed the link from Dallas and El Paso, near Ciudad Juárez.

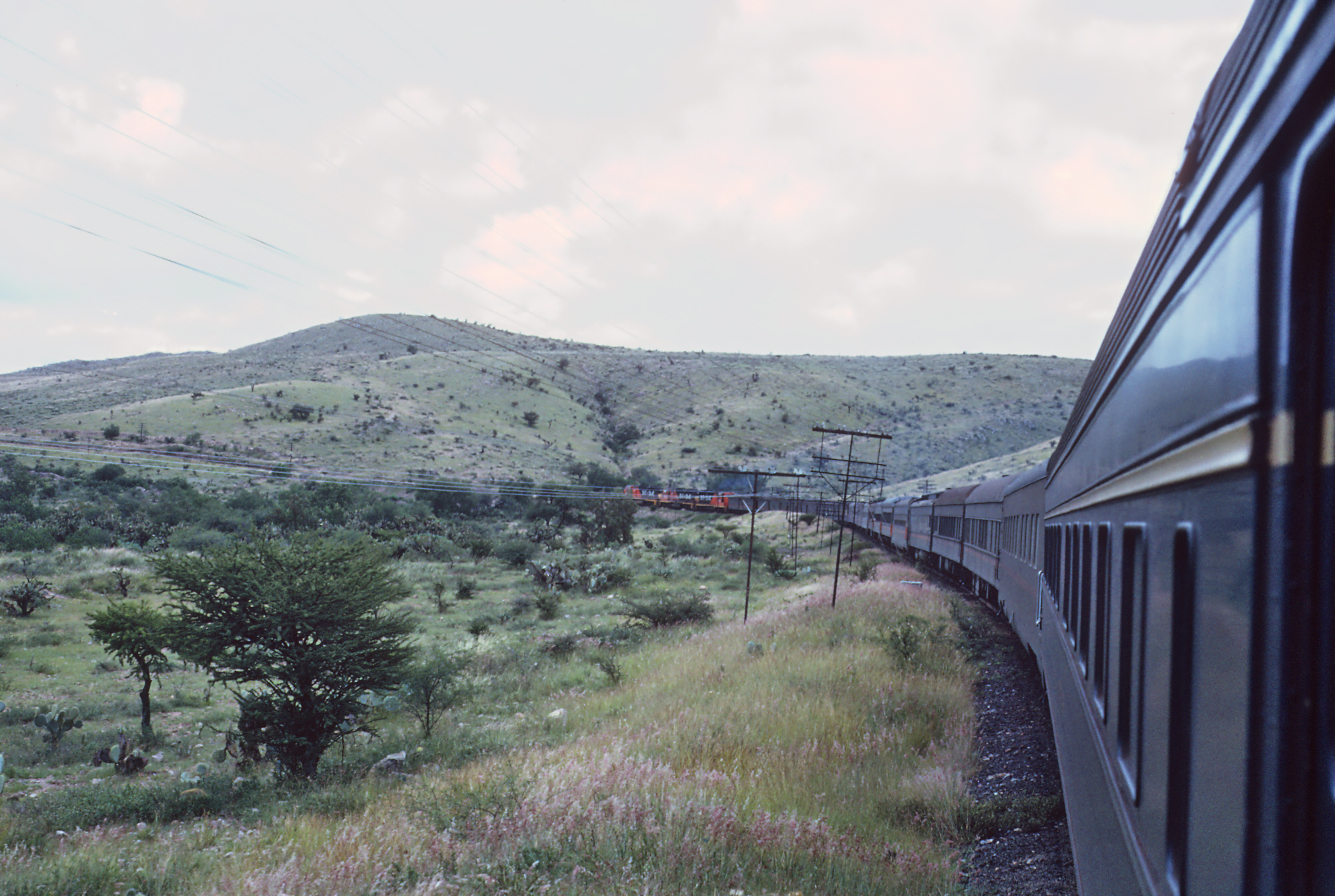
The train south of San Luis Potosí, 1966.

Beginning in 1915, the flagship train of the Missouri Pacific was the Sunshine Special, which eventually carried through sleeping cars from St. Louis to Mexico City via Laredo.

From July 4, 1937, the MP operated a train called the City of Mexico once a week from St. Louis to Mexico City. The City of Mexico departed every Sunday night and arrived in Mexico City on Tuesday night. The train was long described as the fastest connection for travelers from Europe, who arrived by steamboat in New York, and then traveled on a "luxury tourist train" to Mexico City. This service ended in December 1940.

The Aztec Eagle first appeared on Missouri Pacific schedules after the Texas Eagle's inauguration in August 1948. The Texas Eagle ended the long-standing operation of Pullman cars on the Sunshine Special between St. Louis and Mexico City, and MP officials were unwilling to allocate their limited number of streamlined cars for service in Mexico. The Águila Azteca, numbered as trains 21 and 22, thus served as an extension of the Texas Eagle, although a multi-platform train change was required in San Antonio.

In 1952, the Ferrocarriles Nacionales de México received elegant trains built by Schindler Waggon of Switzerland. These trains consisted of ensuite rooms and also Pullman type rooms with beds.

However, by the 1980s, the train was a mixture of several cars without a dining room, which only ran from Nuevo Laredo to Mexico. There was a more luxurious train consisting only of bunk beds, a restaurant and an observation lounge, known as El Regiomontano, but it only operated from Monterrey to Mexico City.

== International service ==
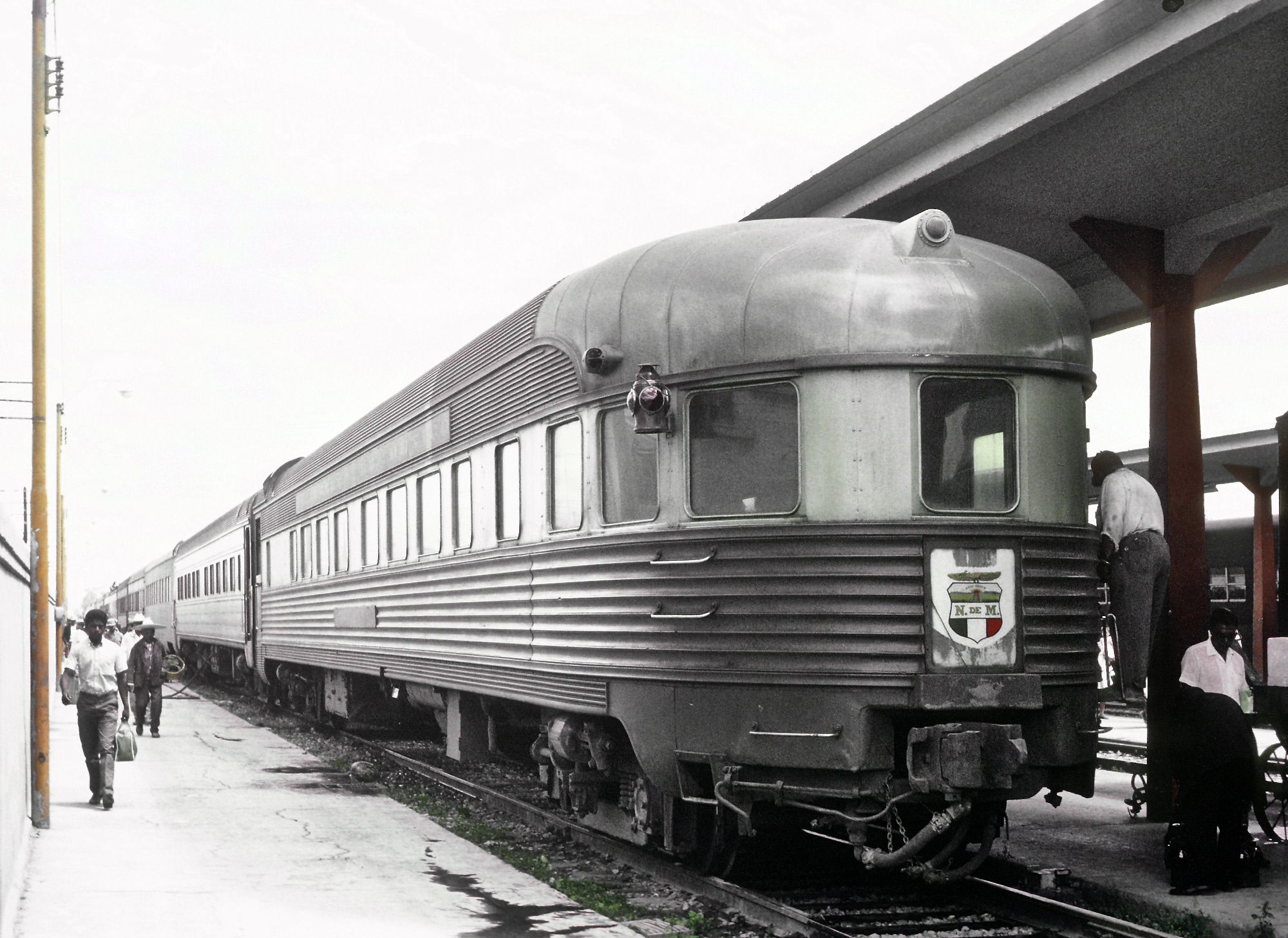
Observation car at the San Luis Potosí station, 1966.

From its beginnings, until the end of the 1960s, some of the train's coaches and Pullman sleeping cars continued from Nuevo Laredo, onto the Texas and Pacific and Missouri Pacific operated Texas Eagle to Saint Louis. The Pullman sleepers lasted until the end of Pullman sleeper operations on the Missouri Pacific on December 31, 1968, while the through coaches from Nuevo Laredo to San Antonio ceased operations in January 1969, a few weeks later.

From 1973 to 1981, the Inter-American made it possible for passengers in Laredo to cross the border into Nuevo Laredo and connect with the NdeM train.

== Amenities ==
The train had different amenities such as showers, a dining room, family bedrooms and a bar-observation car.

Some dining cars stood out for their elegance. The train kitchens were designed and adapted for the needs of the cooks. Some time later, the kitchens were renovated in order to make food preparation quicker.

The train usually used the Mitla and Monte Albán dining cars, in which passengers could enjoy good dishes at affordable prices. There were also cafeteria cars where they were allowed to play cards and smoke, which were attended by cooks and waiters. Later, the NdeM moved on from elegance and sobriety to minimalism.

== Revival ==
Plan Mexico, a funding plan for Mexico's infrastructure, announced a potential revival of the Aztec Eagle. Unlike the Tren Maya on the Yucatán Peninsula, which took years to plan and construct for service which commenced in 2023, tracks for the revival of the Aztec Eagle are already laid with station construction planned to commence in July 2025.

== See also ==
- El Regiomontano
- Rail transport in Mexico
- Ferrocarriles Nacionales de México
- Missouri Pacific Railroad
