= Newport station (Arkansas) =

Newport, AR
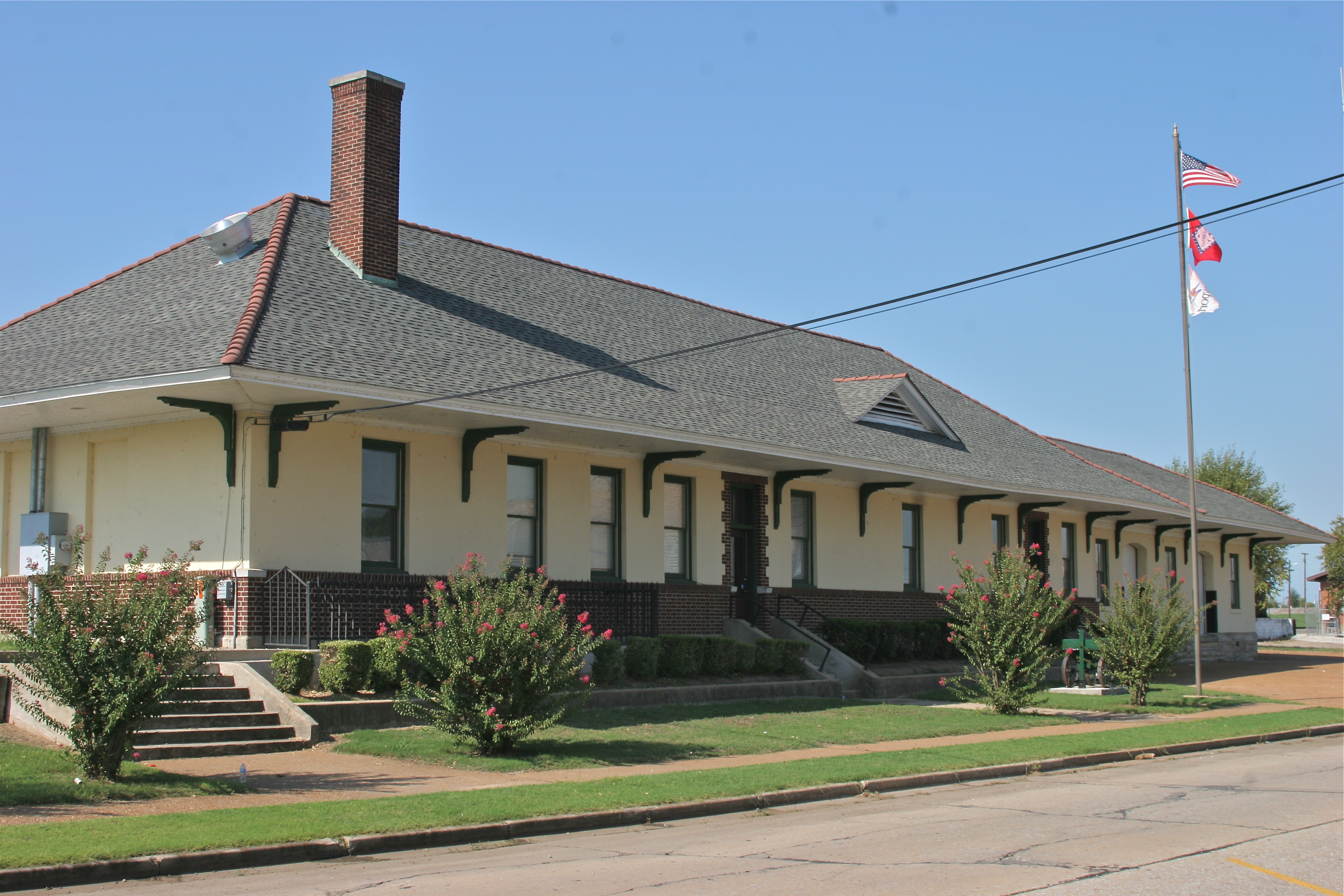
- Newport station in September 2012

Other information
- Station code: NPT

History
- Opened: September 15, 1974
- Closed: April 14, 1996

Former services
Preceding station	Amtrak	Following station
Little Rock toward Laredo or Houston	Inter-American	Walnut Ridge toward Chicago
Little Rock toward Los Angeles or San Antonio	Texas Eagle	Walnut Ridge toward Chicago
Preceding station	Missouri Pacific Railroad	Following station
Russell toward Texarkana	Texarkana – St. Louis	Diaz toward St. Louis
- Missouri-Pacific Depot-Newport
- U.S. National Register of Historic Places
- Location within Arkansas Location within the United States
- Location: NW of jct. of Walnut and Front Sts., Newport, Arkansas
- Coordinates: 35°36′23″N 91°17′0″W
- Area: less than one acre
- Built: 1904
- Built by: Missouri-Pacific Railroad
- Architectural style: Late 19th And 20th Century Revivals, Mediterranean
- MPS: Historic Railroad Depots of Arkansas MPS
- NRHP reference No.: 92000619
- Added to NRHP: June 11, 1992
Location

The Newport station, also known as Missouri-Pacific Depot-Newport, is a historic railroad station at Walnut and Front Streets in Newport, Arkansas. It is a long rectangular single-story brick and stucco topped by a hip roof, whose wide eaves are supported by large Italianate knee brackets. Its roof, originally slate, is now shingled, detracting from its original Mediterranean styling. A telegrapher's bay extends above the roof line on the track side of the building. The building was built in 1904 by the Missouri-Pacific Railroad to handle passenger and freight traffic.

== History ==
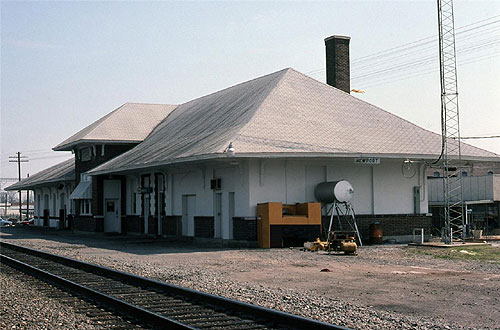
Newport station in March 1990

The Missouri-Pacific Railroad ended service on its crack Texas Eagle on April 30, 1971, one day before Amtrak took over passenger services. In March 1974, Amtrak's Inter-American was extended from Fort Worth to St. Louis, restoring passenger service to the Missouri-Pacific Railroad's main line. In June 1974, Amtrak announced that they would test ridership in northeastern Arkansas by implementing a stop in Newport. On September 15, 1974, stops were added at the former Missouri-Pacific stations in Walnut Ridge and Newport. The Inter-American was replaced by the Eagle in 1981, which in turn was renamed as the Texas Eagle in 1988.

The station was listed on the National Register of Historic Places in 1992. Service to Newport was ended on April 14, 1996, as part of a deal with the Union Pacific Railroad to add the stop at Mineola.

== See also ==
- List of Amtrak stations
- National Register of Historic Places listings in Jackson County, Arkansas
