= Shreveport station =

Shreveport station may refer to one of the following stations in Shreveport, Louisiana, United States:

- Shreveport Central Railroad Station, passenger station for Louisiana and Arkansas Railroad
- Shreveport Union Station, passenger station for the Illinois Central, Kansas City Southern Railway, Frisco Lines, and Southern Pacific
