= The Ginocchio =

Historic hotel in Marshall, Texas, USA

- Ginocchio Hotel
- U.S. Historic district – Contributing property
- Recorded Texas Historic Landmark
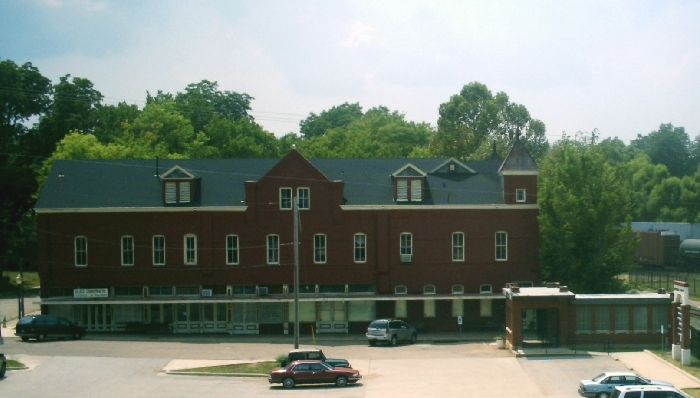
- The Ginocchio in 2005

- Location within Texas Location within the United States
- Location: 705 N. Washington Ave., Marshall, Texas
- Coordinates: 32°33′5″N 94°22′3″W
- Area: less than one acre
- Built: 1896
- Architect: C.G. Lancaster
- Architectural style: Victorian
- Website: theginocchio.com
- Part of: Ginocchio Historic District (ID74002076)
- RTHL No.: 10164

Significant dates
- Designated CP: December 31, 1974
- Designated RTHL: 1971

The Ginocchio or Ginocchio Hotel is a historic hotel in Marshall, Texas that was originally constructed in 1896 next to the Texas and Pacific Railway station. At that time, it was on the same side of the tracks and provided disembarking passengers with ready access to a hotel and restaurant facility. During its height, the building housed several U.S. Presidents and actor John Barrymore (whose father, Maurice Barrymore, was shot at the Marshall train station in 1879, and whose granddaughter is actress Drew Barrymore), among others. The name is derived from the family that built the building that is located in the Ginocchio Historic District of the National Register of Historic Places. In 2017, the establishment reopened under new ownership as a restaurant and bar after being closed for renovations for two years.

== See also ==
- National Register of Historic Places listings in Harrison County, Texas
- Recorded Texas Historic Landmarks in Harrison County
