= Texas and Pacific 400 =

Mikado class steam locomotive

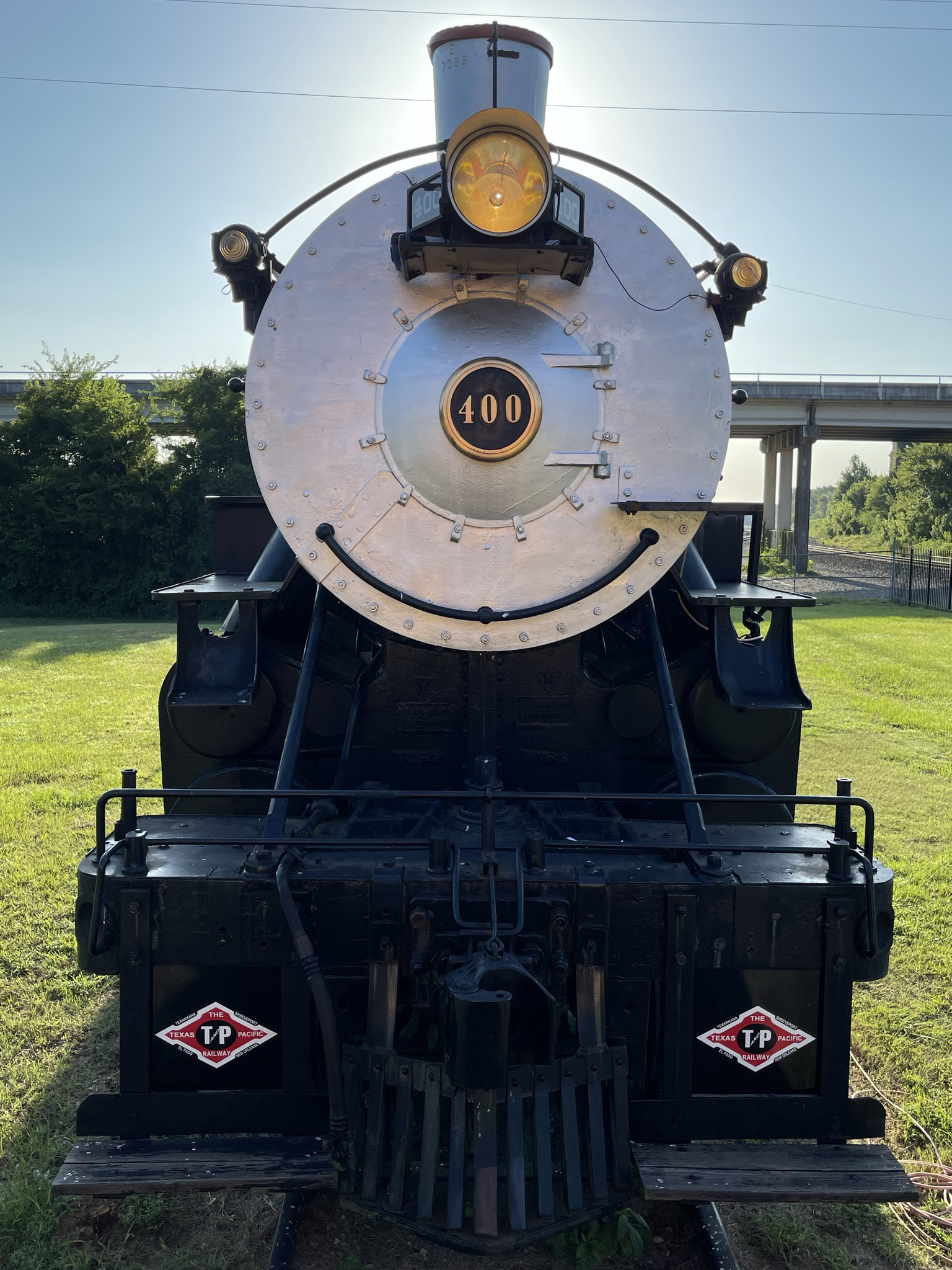
- Texas and Pacific 400
Type and origin
- Power type: Steam
- Builder: Baldwin Locomotive Works
- Serial number: 42125
- Build date: June 1915
Specifications
- Configuration
  - Whyte: 2-8-2
  - UIC: 1'D1
- Gauge: 4 feet 8 1/2 inches (1,435 mm) standard gauge
- Driver dia.: 64 inches (1,600 mm)
- Adhesive weight: 213,425 pounds (96,808 kg)
- Loco weight: 273,125 pounds (123,887 kg)
- Tender weight: 174,000 pounds (79,000 kg)
- Total weight: 447,125 pounds (202,812 kg)
- Fuel type: Oil
- Fuel capacity: 4050 gals (18,411.66 Liters)
- Water cap.: 8200 gals (37,277.94 Liter)
- Boiler pressure: 200 psi (1,400 kPa)
- Cylinders: Two, outside
- Cylinder size: 27 in × 32 in (690 mm × 810 mm)
- Valve gear: Walschaerts
- Valve type: Piston valves
- Loco brake: Air
- Train brakes: Air
- Couplers: Knuckle
Performance figures
- Tractive effort: 58,092 pounds (26,350 kg)
Career
- Operators: Fort Worth and Denver Railway (1915-1958) Texas and Pacific Railway (1958-1963)
- Number in class: 10th of 10
- Numbers: FW&D 410; T&P 400
- Retired: 1963
- Current owner: City of Marshall, Texas
- Disposition: On static display

Fort Worth and Denver City Railway 410 / Texas and Pacific Railway 400 is a class "E-4A1" 2-8-2 "Mikado" that was originally operated by the Fort Worth and Denver City Railway (FW&DC). It served the FW&D from 1915 to 1958 before being sold to the T&P on January 29, 1958. It was briefly used for Flood Service in Louisiana before being retired and donated to Marshall, Texas in 1963. Today, the locomotive is on display at the Texas and Pacific Railway Museum in Marshall, Texas.

== History ==
=== Fort Worth and Denver Railway ===
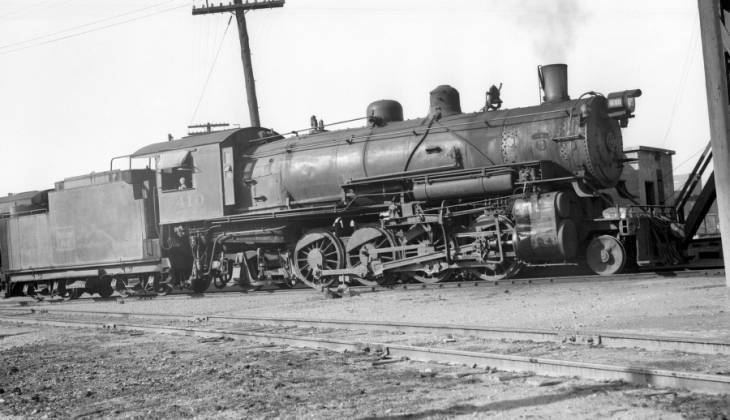
Locomotive No. 410 at Wichita Falls, Texas in 1932.

Built in June 1915 by the Baldwin Locomotive Works, No. 410 and its class, the E-4A1s, were the first oil burners purchased by the FW&DC. The No. 410 was delivered to Amarillo, Texas on June 30, 1915, and was immediately put into use by the FW&DC, along with its sisters (401–409). The E-4A1 class were based on the Chicago, Burlington and Quincy O-1 class locomotives 5000–5059. In 1928, the 410's oil capacity was raised from 3,050 imperial gallons (13,900 liters) to its current 4,050 imperial gallons (18,400 liters). This change made the oil bunker visible from the top of the tender. Sometime in the 1920s, the original wooden cab was replaced by a modernized steel cab. In 1948, the cab was moved back two feet (610 mm). The E-4A1 class served the FW&D until the end of steam, with their last assignments being on the Wichita Valley line and the South Plains line to Lubbock. On January 29, 1958, the 410 was sold to the Texas and Pacific Railway. The rest of the E-4A1's were sold for scrap, beginning in 1955 and lasting until 1960.

=== Texas and Pacific Railway ===
The Texas and Pacific Railway started to experience floodwaters from the Red River on their Louisiana line east of Shreveport. At this time, the T&P was already dieselized. The diesel locomotives were not able to carry trains through the flood waters due to the water killing the traction motors. Because of this, the T&P decided to borrow a Mikado from the FW&D in 1957. In 1958, the decision was made to purchase locomotive 410 from the FW&D. The 410 was shipped to Marshall, Texas from Fort Worth, where it began a number of cosmetic changes. The most noticeable difference was the renumbering from 410 to 400. The one on the number plate was pried off and replaced with a zero. The font size of the numbers on the cab was enlarged, with the FW&D road name being removed. The Burlington Route logo on the tender was painted over and replaced with Texas and Pacific. To top it all off, the boiler jacket and cylinders were painted olive green. In May 1958, the 400 began its secondary career.

The Red River had flooded the tracks, with some sections being under 38 inches (97 centimeters) of water. Since there was no water stations on the T&P anymore, the 400 had to carry water car No. 25257. On May 12, the 400 pulled a 125 car train through the waters west of Zimmerman, Louisiana. The longest train it pulled through the waters was 159 cars. Even with the throttle wide open, the locomotive stalled every 36 seconds. The 400 was quoted to sound more like a steamboat by Harold K. Vollrath.

The locomotive was given the nickname "Moccasin" for its service in the water.

=== Retirement and Static Display ===
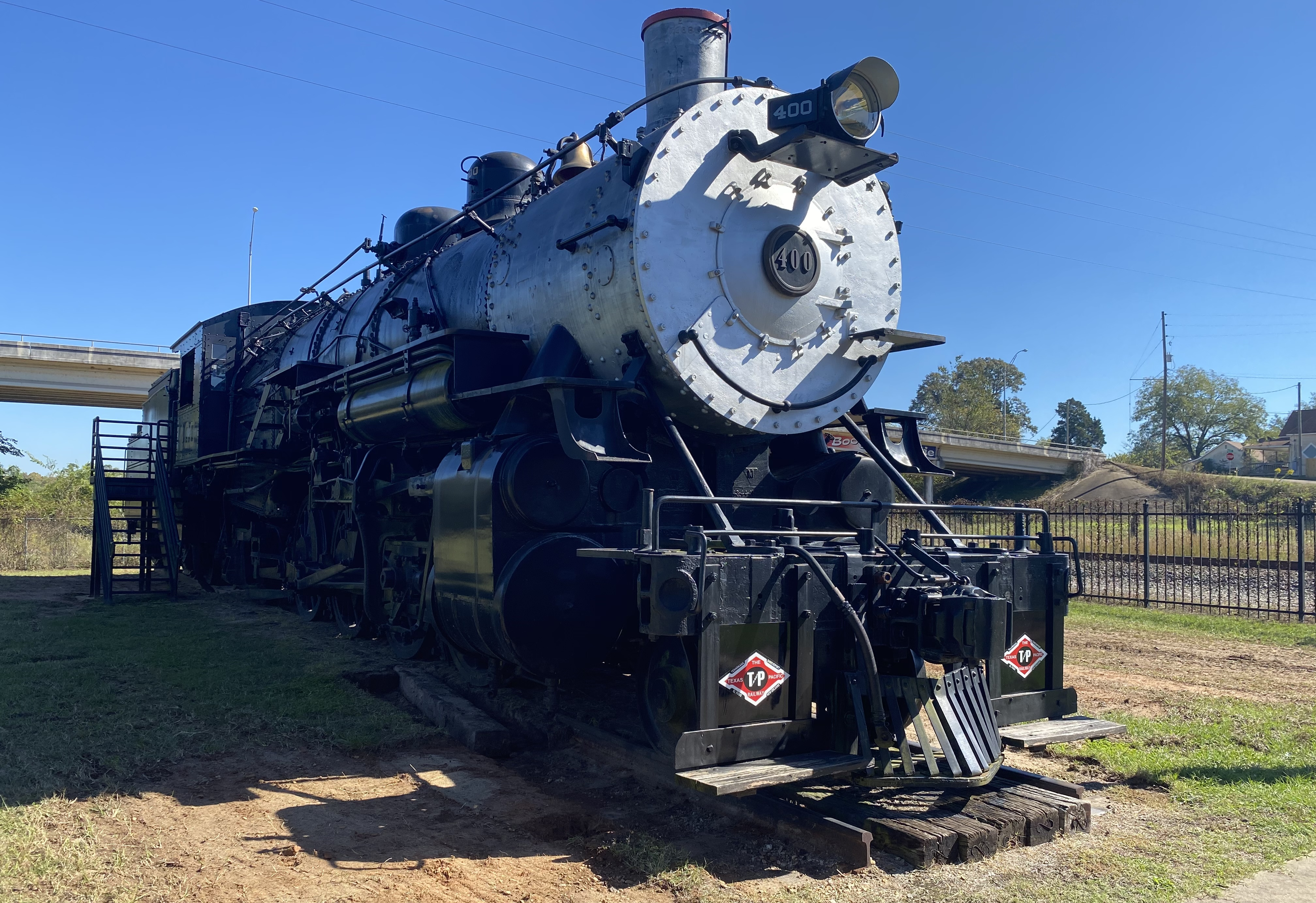
No. 400 on static display near the Marshall station, 2020

In 1963, the 400 was retired from service. Instead of selling it for scrap, the T&P gave it one last paint job and donated it to the City of Marshall. The 400 was dragged out to the Marshall City Park on the old Marshall and East Texas Railway mainline where it was put on a display piece of track.

During the years, the locomotive was subjected to the elements and vandalism. In the early 2000s, the 400 had a metal building built around it to protect the locals from asbestos. The asbestos was then removed. In May 2008, 50 years after the 400 began service with the T&P, the 400 was moved to the T&P Museum Depot in Marshall for display just behind Union Pacific caboose No. 25687. It was given a cosmetic restoration, and general repairs were made to the cab floor so it would be safe for visitors to walk on. In October 2015, the depot museum celebrated the locomotive's 100 year birthday.

== See also ==
- Baldwin Locomotive Works
- Texas and Pacific Railway
- Texas and Pacific 610
