= Shreveport Union Station =

Train Passenger station

General information
- Location: Shreveport, Louisiana
- Coordinates: 32.5088°N 93.7482°W

History
- Opened: 1897
- Closed: November 3, 1969

Services
Preceding station	Illinois Central Railroad	Following station
Terminus	Vicksburg Route Division	Bossier City toward Meridian
Preceding station	Kansas City Southern Railway	Following station
Blanchard toward Kansas City	Main Line	Forbing toward Port Arthur
Terminus	Shreveport – Minden	Silver Lake Junction toward Minden
Preceding station	Missouri Pacific Railroad	Following station
Reisor toward El Paso	Texas and Pacific Railway Main Line	Keithville toward New Orleans
Preceding station	St. Louis Southwestern Railway	Following station
Terminus	Shreveport – Lewisville	Brownlee toward Lewisville
Location

Shreveport Union Station was a passenger station on Louisiana Avenue, at Lake Street, Shreveport, Louisiana. Built in 1897 by the Kansas City, Shreveport & Gulf Terminal Company, it was the oldest of Shreveport's four passenger railroad stations. With a tall tower, the station became a landmark in downtown Shreveport. It had its highest levels of service in the 1920s, typically hosting 35 passenger trains a day.

As a union station, it was served by trains of the Kansas City Southern Railway, Illinois Central, St. Louis Southwestern Railway (Cotton Belt), and Southern Pacific.

== Passenger operations ==
Noteworthy passenger trains in 1958 included:

- Illinois Central:
  - Southwestern Limited (Shreveport - Meridian, Mississippi)
- Kansas City Southern:
  - Shreveporter (Shreveport - Hope, Arkansas)
  - Southern Belle (Kansas City - New Orleans)
  - unnamed train Kansas City to Port Arthur via Leesville and Beaumont

Noteworthy passenger trains in 1951 consisted of:

- St. Louis Southwestern Railway:
  - unnamed Shreveport to Lewisville train (connecting with St.L.Sw. mainline and Lone Star in Lewisville)
- Southern Pacific:
  - unnamed Shreveport to Galveston via Houston trains

== Decline and demise ==
By 1965, service reduced to the Illinois Central's Southwestern Limited and the Kansas City Southern's Kansas City, NewOrleans and Port Arthur trains.

The Southern Belle, the last train to serve Union Station, had its final run on November 2, 1969. The station closed the next day. The station burned two days after the station's closing. The fire department indicated that the fire began in the basement. The remaining parts of the building were soon demolished. The Texas and Pacific's remnant of its Louisiana Eagle was the final train to serve Shreveport, at the T&P station in the city.

== See also ==
- Shreveport Central Railroad Station
