= Bunkie station =

- Texas and Pacific Railroad Depot
- U.S. National Register of Historic Places
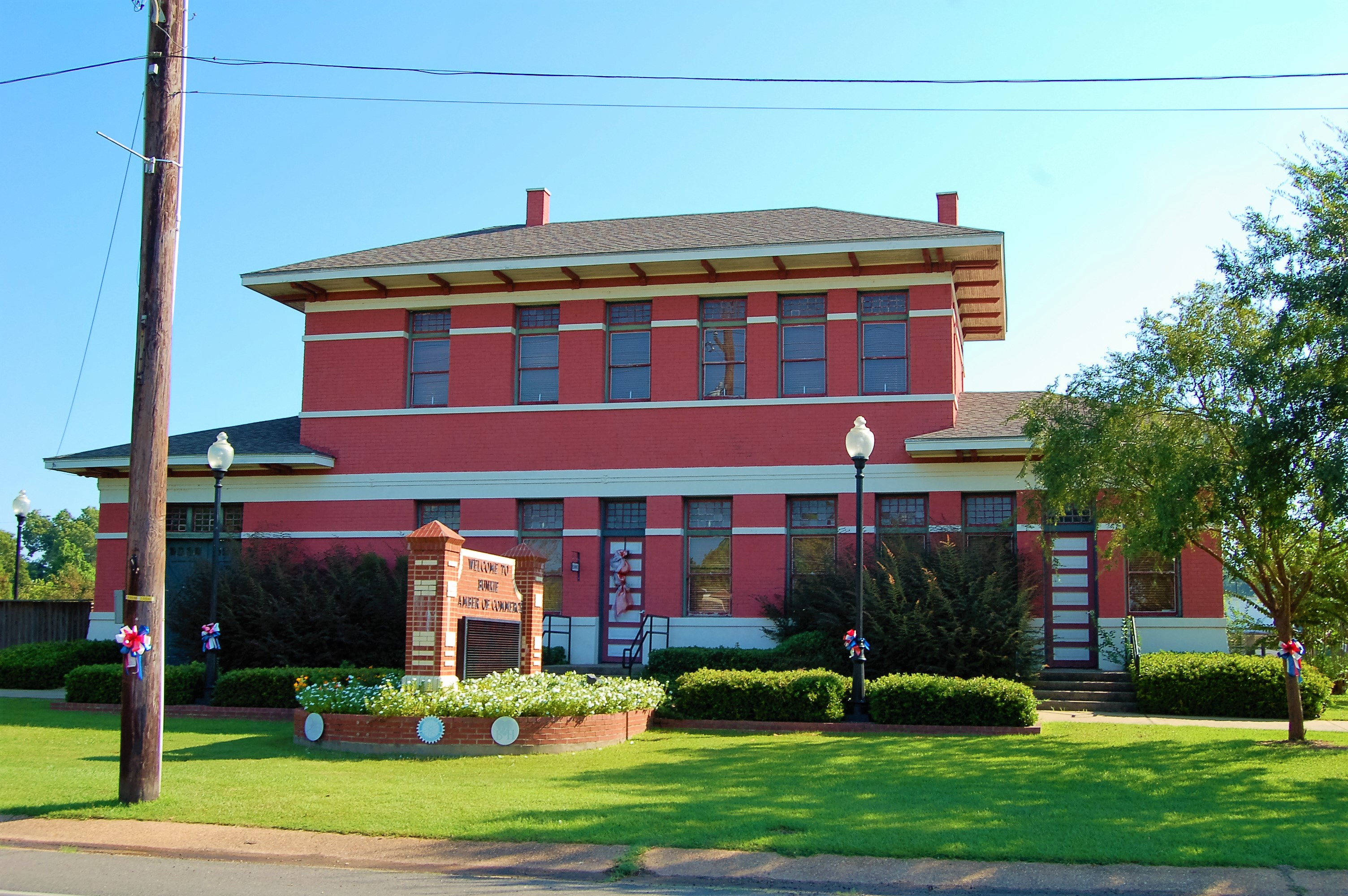

- Location within Louisiana
- Location: North corner of West Main Street and East Oak Street, Bunkie, Louisiana
- Coordinates: 30°57′19″N 92°11′04″W
- Area: less than one acre
- Built: 1911
- NRHP reference No.: 91000345
- Added to NRHP: March 22, 1991

Bunkie station is an historic train station in Bunkie, Louisiana.

== History ==
The Texas and Pacific Railway established a station on the main line at Bunkie in 1882. A town formed around it as a shipping point for cotton and cotton-related industries such as cottonseed oil production. The current depot, built in 1911, is not the original freight depot, but is the only existing reminder of the importance of the railway to the founding of Bunkie.

The 1911 depot is a two-story brick building alongside the railroad tracks in downtown Bunkie. Of no particular architectural style, the building sits on a heavily stuccoed dado and has a distinctive bay window overlooking the tracks. It is one of only three remaining larger multi-story urban train depots in Louisiana built in the early 20th century, the others are the Central Railroad Station in Shreveport, and the Kansas City Southern Depot in DeQuincy.

== Later years ==
Though the building has gone through several changes over the years, it remains easily identifiable as a train depot. The depot was listed on the National Register of Historic Places in 1991 as the Texas and Pacific Railroad Depot. It was remodeled in 2001 and as of 2013 houses a small railroad museum and the headquarters of the Bunkie Chamber of Commerce.

Preceding station	Missouri Pacific Railroad	Following station
Cheneyville toward El Paso	Texas and Pacific Railway Main Line	Eola toward New Orleans

== See also ==
- National Register of Historic Places listings in Avoyelles Parish, Louisiana
