= DeQuincy station =

- Kansas City Southern Depot
- U.S. National Register of Historic Places
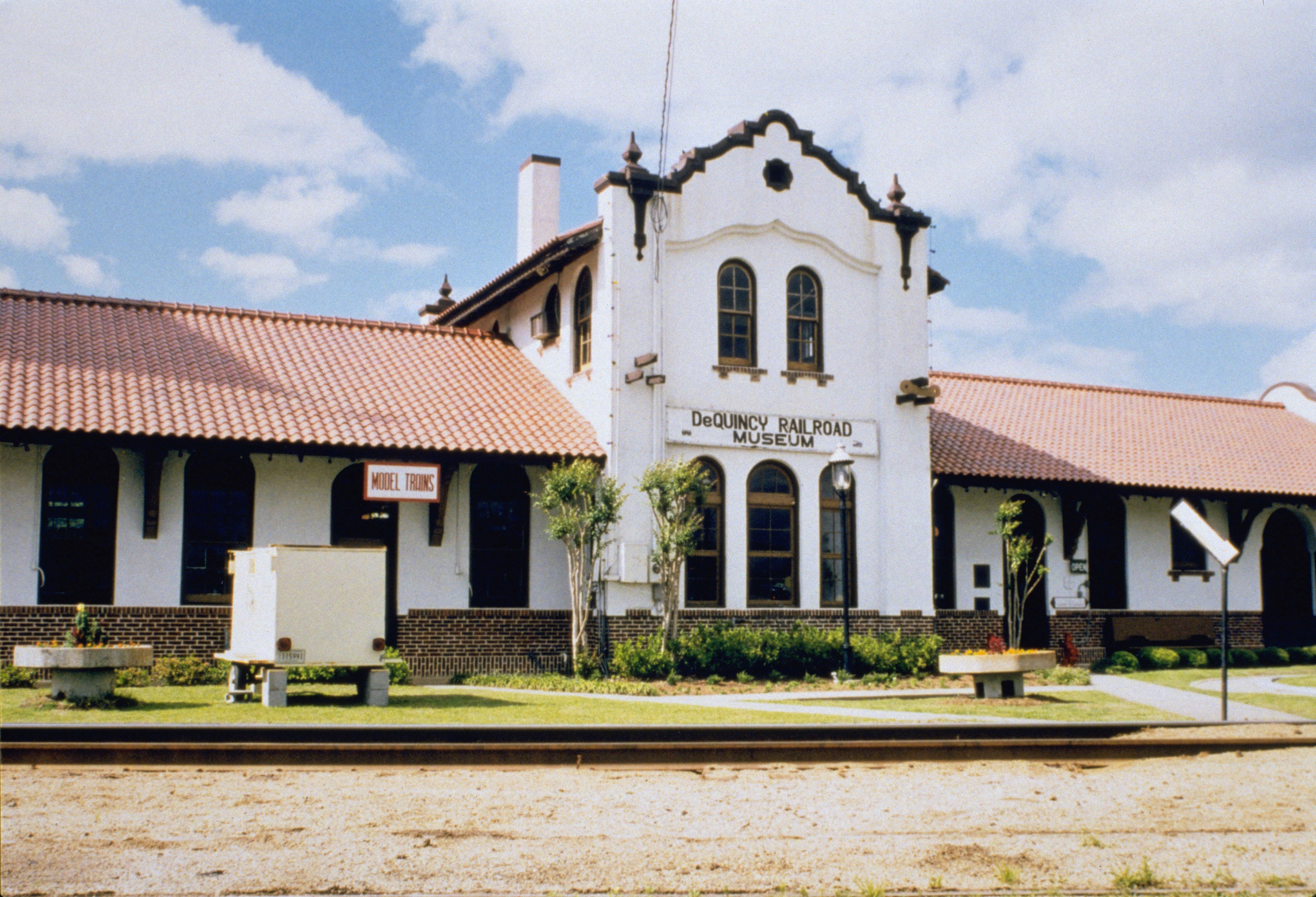

- Location within Louisiana Location within the United States
- Location: 400 Lake Charles Avenue, DeQuincy, Louisiana
- Coordinates: 30°27′06″N 93°26′07″W
- Area: 0.5 acres (0.20 ha)
- Built by: Kansas City Southern Railroad
- Architectural style: Mission Revival architecture
- NRHP reference No.: 83000494
- Added to NRHP: January 20, 1995

The Kansas City Southern Depot is an historic train station, located at 400 Lake Charles Avenue, in DeQuincy, Louisiana. The depot is currently home to the DeQuincy Railroad Museum.

== History ==
The Kansas City Southern Railroad completed a line from Shreveport to Lake Charles in 1897, that ran through and split in Dequincy, also going to Beaumont and Port Arthur, Texas. The community of DeQuincy was incorporated in 1903, and a new modern urban depot was built in 1923, of Mission Revival architecture. Urban depots of that time were larger, typically multi-story, and built with a recognizable architectural style, as opposed to the simpler board and batten structures found in villages. The DeQuincy depot is one of three such urban railroad stations still existing in Louisiana, the others are the Central Railroad Station in Shreveport, and the Texas and Pacific Railroad Depot in Bunkie. All three are listed on the National Register of Historic Places.

DeQuincy hosts the annual Louisiana Railroad Days Festival, held on the museum grounds, on the second weekend in April, that includes the annual pageant, and Lorrie Morgan headlined the 2014 festival.

The Depot was added to the National Register of Historic Places on September 22, 1983.

== Currently ==
The train station was established as an historical museum in 1974 with railroad-related artifacts from the Kansas City Southern Railroad, Missouri Pacific, and the Union Pacific Railroads. As of August 20, 2013, Union Pacific presented DeQuincy Mayor Debra Smith a resolution awarding the town membership in the Train Town USA registry, celebrating 150 years, that thus far is only shared with Natchitoches, and Bunkie, in the state of Louisiana. The membership is reserved for towns and cities along the railroad with shared heritage.

== See also ==
- National Register of Historic Places listings in Calcasieu Parish, Louisiana

Preceding station	Kansas City Southern Railway	Following station
Wasey toward Kansas City	Main Line	Lucas toward Port Arthur
Terminus	DeQuincy – Lake Charles	Turner toward Lake Charles
