= Nuevo Laredo railway station =

Nuevo Laredo

General information
- Location: Av César López de Lara 1020, Centro, 88000; Nuevo Laredo, Tamaulipas, Mexico
- Coordinates: 27°29′27″N 99°31′01″W
- Operated by: Ferrocarriles Nacionales de México (formerly)
- Line(s): Mexico-Nuevo Laredo Line
- Platforms: 4
- Tracks: 4
- Connections: Amtrak shuttle bus to Laredo station (1973-1981)

History
- Closed: 1990s
- Rebuilt: 1914

Former services
Preceding station	N de M	Following station
Villaldama toward Mexico City (Buenavista)	Águila Azteca	Terminus
Villaldama toward Mexico City (Buenavista)	Águila Azteca	Laredo (U.S.) Pre-1969 toward San Antonio (U.S.)

Nuevo Laredo railway station is a former train station located in Nuevo Laredo, Tamaulipas, in Mexico. It is currently a building listed by the Instituto Nacional de Antropología e Historia (INAH) of Tamaulipas as a historical monument and heritage of Nuevo Laredo.

== History ==
The first train passed through on November 20, 1881, and belonged to the Mexican National Railroad company. This first express, passing through Nuevo Laredo, had stops in Monterrey, Saltillo, San Luis Potosí, San Miguel de Allende and Querétaro, to culminate its journey in Mexico City.

The current Municipal Archive of Nuevo Laredo (Spanish: Archivo Municipal de Nuevo Laredo) was the site of the first railway station in the city. On 15 January 1911, the contract to build the station was signed. Built of wood initially and rebuilt in stone in 1914 after being burned down by Huertistas, the railway station is today one of the best preserved historical sites in the city.

The reconstruction work was carried out by an English company hired by the Ferrocarriles Nacionales de México. In Victorian style, it was built with sedimentary rock of the marine sandstone type.

In 2002 work began on the remodeling of the premises, so that it could be used for educational and cultural purposes, thanks to this, it is currently the headquarters of the Historical Archive.

== See also ==
- Laredo station
