= Sunshine Special =

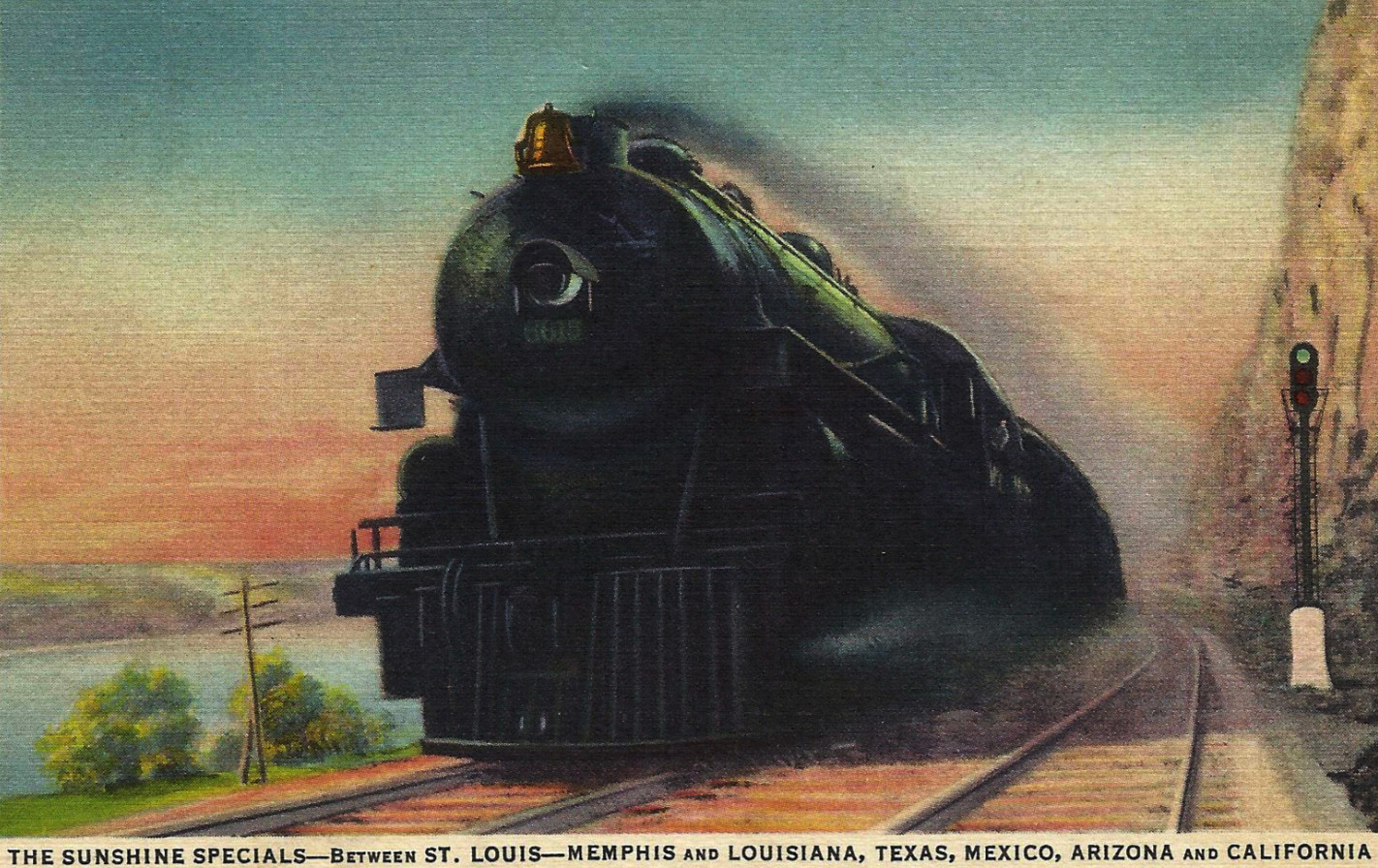
- Postcard depiction of the train in 1936.

Overview
- Service type: Inter-city rail
- Status: Discontinued
- Locale: Southwestern United States
- First service: 1915
- Last service: 1960
- Former operator: Missouri Pacific Railroad

Route
- Termini: St. Louis, Missouri, Memphis, Tennessee and New Orleans, Louisiana branches El Paso, Texas, and Laredo, Texas, branches and branches to other points in Texas; Until 1948, a branch of the train continued on from Laredo to Mexico City, Mexico
- Service frequency: Daily
- Train numbers: 31 (westbound); 32 (eastbound)

On-board services
- Seating arrangements: Reclining seat coaches
- Sleeping arrangements: Sections, bedrooms, drawing rooms and compartments
- Catering facilities: Dining cars; Dining-lounge car in 1950s

Technical
- Track gauge: 1,435 mm (4 ft 8 1/2 in)

"Drumhead" logos such as this often adorned the end car on the Sunshine Special.

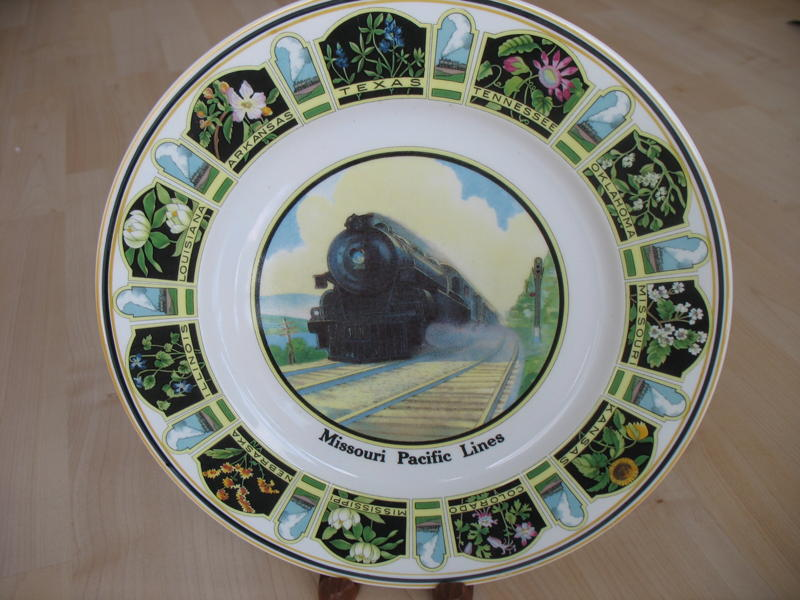
This dining car plate was issued to commemorate the 13th anniversary of the Sunshine Special.

The Sunshine Special was inaugurated by the St. Louis, Iron Mountain and Southern Railway, (later the Missouri Pacific Railroad), on December 5, 1915, to provide a premium level of passenger train service between St. Louis, Little Rock, and destinations in Texas, United States, such as El Paso, San Antonio, Laredo and Houston. An auxiliary section of the train originated in Memphis, Tennessee, and linked with the train in Little Rock, Arkansas.

The train ran from St. Louis to either Longview or Marshall in East Texas. Their cars for Dallas, Ft. Worth and El Paso were cut out and forwarded over M.P. subsidiary Texas and Pacific. Cars for Houston were cut out at Palestine, Texas.

Until being shifted into a secondary role by the Texas Eagle diesel powered streamliner in August 1948, the Sunshine Special served as the flagship of the Missouri Pacific Railroad's passenger train service. Prior to the advent of the Texas Eagle, the San Antonio/Laredo section of the train continued over the Ferrocarriles Nacionales de México (N de M) as the Águila Azteca or Aztec Eagle to Mexico City, Mexico.

Between July 7, 1946, and April 25, 1948, the Missouri Pacific and the Pennsylvania Railroad operated the Sunshine Special jointly between New York City and Texas. Low traffic west of St. Louis prompted the Missouri Pacific to withdraw from the joint operation in favor of exchanging sleeper cars. The PRR renamed its train the Texas Eagle on August 15, then finally the Penn Texas on December 12. The last vestige of the Sunshine Special, an unnamed train did not disappear from Missouri Pacific timetables until 1962. The Texas Eagle achieved greater patronage volume and survived until 1971 when the MP gave up its passenger service to Amtrak.

== Baylor University's Immortal Ten ==
The Sunshine Special was thrust into the national spotlight on January 22, 1927, when it struck a bus carrying members of the Baylor University basketball team in Round Rock, Texas. According to reports, the bus driver, 19-year-old Joe Potter, failed to see the train approaching the crossing at nearly sixty miles per hour from the bus' right. When Potter did see the train, he felt he had no choice but to attempt to beat it across the tracks. Attempting to put more distance between the bus and the train, Potter veered to his left, moving the bus farther ahead of the train. The results were disastrous, with ten Baylor students killed. The tragedy gave rise to Baylor's longstanding tradition of remembering "The Immortal Ten."

== Bibliography ==
- Adams, W.M. (1976). "The Sunshine Special". National Railway Bulletin. 41 (2). Philadelphia, PA: National Railway Historical Society: 4–26.
- Sanders, Craig (2003). Limiteds, Locals, and Expresses in Indiana, 1838–1971. Bloomington, Indiana: Indiana University Press. ISBN 978-0-253-34216-4.
- Sanders, Craig (2008). Mattoon and Charleston Area Railroads. Arcadia Publishing. ISBN 978-0-7385-5228-6.
