= Ginocchio Historic District =

Historic district in Marshall, Texas, USA

- U.S. National Register of Historic Places
- U.S. Historic district
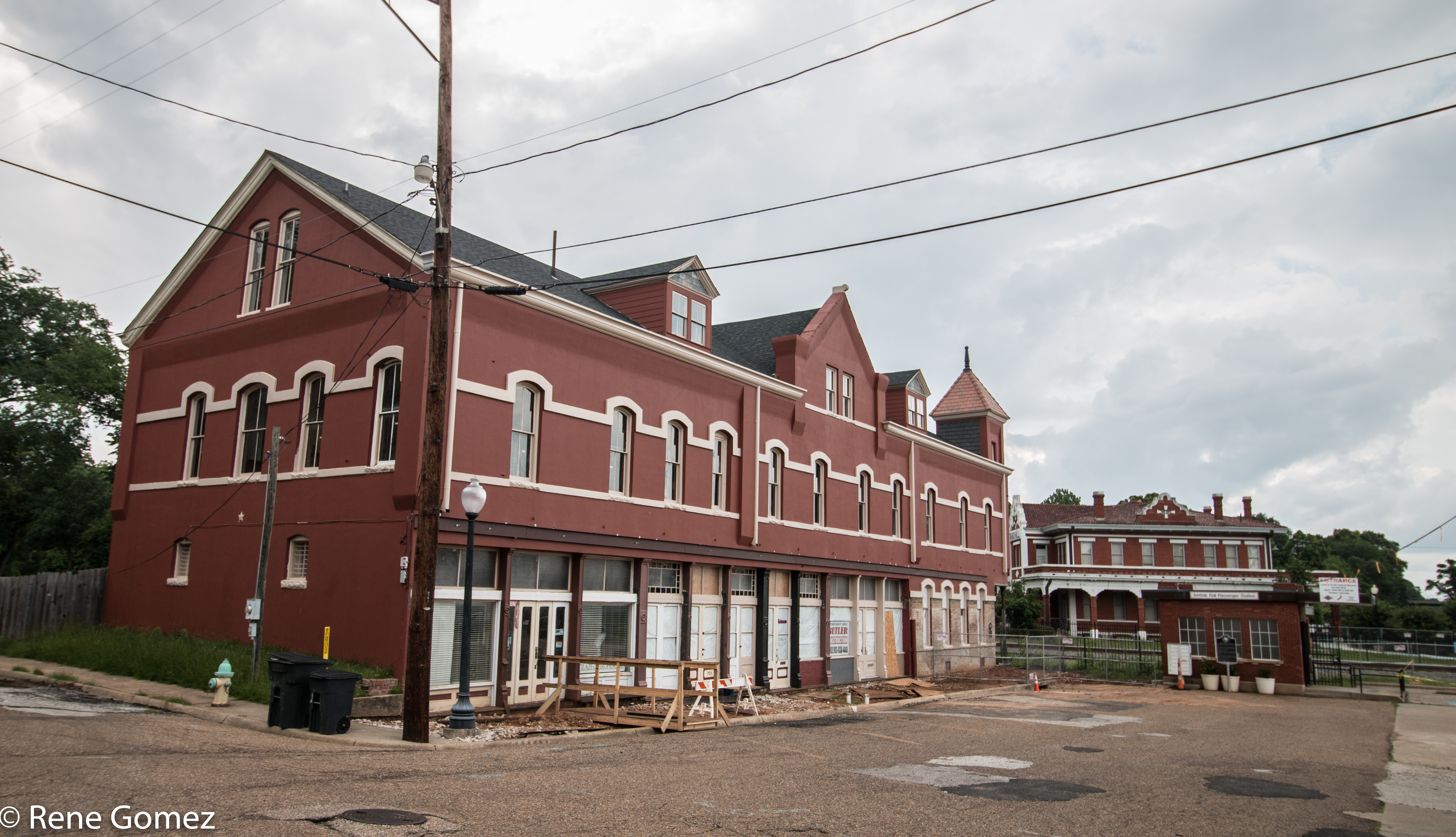
- The Ginocchio and the T&P Depot in the background in 2017

- Location within Texas Location within the United States
- Location: Bounded by Grand Ave., and N. Franklin, Willow, and Lake Sts., Marshall, Texas
- Coordinates: 32°33′5″N 94°21′57″W
- Area: 25 acres (10 ha)
- Built: 1886
- Architect: Multiple
- Architectural style: Queen Anne, Mission/Spanish Revival, Victorian
- NRHP reference No.: 74002076
- Added to NRHP: December 31, 1974

Ginocchio Historic District, in Marshall, Texas is a historic district listed on the National Register of Historic Places. The district takes its name from the Ginocchio family who operated a hotel, The Ginocchio, in the district during the late 19th and early 20th centuries. The district houses numerous historic buildings including: Allen House, The Ginocchio, T&P Depot, the Heflin-Thompson House and the Whaley House. The district is also home to two museums the Harrison County Historical Museum in the Ginocchio and the T&P Railway Museum in the T&P Depot. On January 26, 2007, the Heflin-Thompson House caught fire and suffered much damage. Ricky Thompson, Joel and Michelle Heflin all lost their home and most of their belongings in the fire.

The museum was moved from the Ginocchio hotel to the rear of the Memorial City Hall located at the southeast corner of the town square, and the Ginocchio hotel is currently being renovated with the new Ginocchio Restaurant and Bar slated to open soon.

The T&P museum remains in the depot and is open according to their posted hours.

== See also ==
- National Register of Historic Places listings in Harrison County, Texas
- Recorded Texas Historic Landmarks in Harrison County
