= Marshall station (Texas) =

Railroad station in Marshall, Texas

Marshall, TX
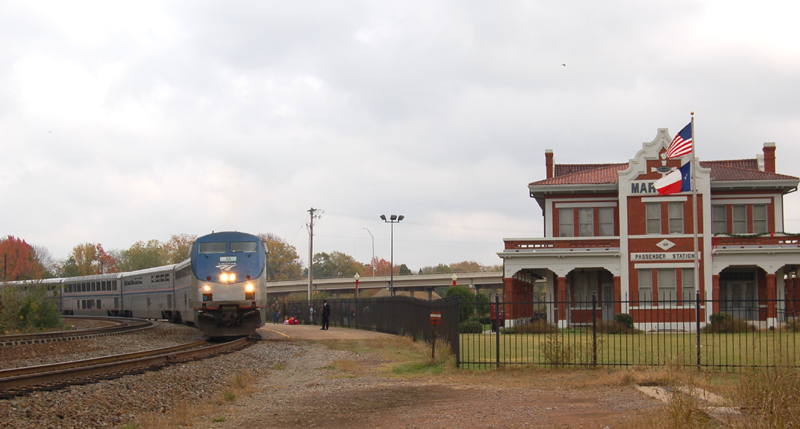
- Texas and Pacific Depot in 2005

General information
- Location: 800 North Washington Avenue, Marshall, Texas; United States
- Coordinates: 32°33′7″N 94°22′3″W
- Owner: Union Pacific Railroad
- Line: Union Pacific Railroad
- Platforms: 1 side platform
- Tracks: 2
- Connections: Marshall Public Bus System

Construction
- Parking: Yes
- Accessible: Yes

Other information
- Station code: Amtrak: MHL

History
- Opened: October 20, 1912 (Texas and Pacific); March 13, 1974 (Amtrak)

Passengers
- FY 2025: 14,482 (Amtrak)

Services
Preceding station	Amtrak	Following station
Longview toward Los Angeles or San Antonio	Texas Eagle	Texarkana toward Chicago
Former services
Preceding station	Amtrak	Following station
Longview toward Laredo or Houston	Inter-American	Texarkana toward Chicago
Preceding station	Missouri Pacific Railroad	Following station
Hallsville toward El Paso	Texas and Pacific Railway Main Line	Scottsville toward New Orleans
Proposed services
Preceding station	Amtrak	Following station
Longview toward Fort Worth	Crescent Proposed Texas Section	Shreveport toward New York
- Texas and Pacific Depot
- U.S. Historic district – Contributing property
- Recorded Texas Historic Landmark
- Architectural style: Mission Revival
- Part of: Ginocchio Historic District (ID74002076)
- RTHL No.: 10219

Significant dates
- Designated CP: December 31, 1974
- Designated RTHL: 1985
Location

Marshall station is a railroad station in Marshall, Texas. It is served by Amtrak, the national railroad passenger system, which operates the Texas Eagle through Marshall each day, with service north to Chicago and west-southwest to Dallas, San Antonio and Los Angeles. The station also houses the Texas and Pacific Railway Depot & Museum.

The ticket office in Marshall is staffed 7 days a week from 7 a.m. to 10 a.m., and 5:30 p.m. to 8:30 p.m.

== History ==
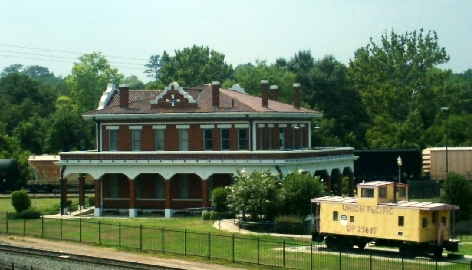
The museum

The station, also known as the T&P Depot, is the only surviving structure of the Texas and Pacific Railway shops complex which originally consisted of fifty-seven buildings spanning 66 acres (270,000 m^{2}).

The building is located in the Ginocchio Historic District of the National Register of Historic Places and was built in 1912 to house a passenger station and the headquarters of railroad's eastern district. The building welcomed soldiers in both World War I and World War II, and at its height housed telegraph and immigration offices.

During the 1970s a series of events led to the station being abandoned. Amtrak passenger trains used the building beginning on March 13, 1974, however in 1988 the Union Pacific Railroad, which owned the property, filed for a permit to demolish the building. The community intervened and throughout the 1990s worked to save the Depot and the building was restored and resumed service as the local train station; additionally, much of the building houses the railway museum.

In 2008 T&P Railway #400, a 2-8-2 "Mikado" type steam locomotive (originally built in 1915 for the Fort Worth & Denver City Railway and later acquired by the T&P), was moved to the depot museum grounds from where it had been previously kept for years before in City Park, and restoration work on the engine was completed a couple of years later. The restoration work included rust removal and a new coat of paint, as well as stair access to the cab of the engine for visitors. The locomotive is now accessible to the public during regular museum hours.

== Centennial celebration ==
On October 20, 2012, the station marked its centennial anniversary with a major community celebration, including free tours of the depot and museum, live music from a Dixieland jazz band, and a traditional lunch picnic on the depot's east lawn. Union Pacific Railroad also contributed significantly to the festivities by bringing the legendary Union Pacific 844 steam locomotive and the UP 150th Anniversary Heritage Train to Marshall for the occasion, as part of its whistle-stop tour celebrating Union Pacific's 150th (sesquicentennial) anniversary. The heritage train with UP 844 and a traveling "museum-on-wheels" baggage car, Promontory, was put on public display at the old T&P rail yard east of the depot, and a free shuttle provided transportation between the depot and the heritage train during the event. The railroad also brought its famous UP No. 956 Mini-Train, which offered free rides around the depot's parking lot.

== See also ==
- List of Amtrak stations
- National Register of Historic Places listings in Harrison County, Texas
- Recorded Texas Historic Landmarks in Harrison County
