= Penn Texas =

Overview
- Service type: Inter-city rail
- Status: Discontinued
- Locale: Midwestern United States/Northeastern United States
- First service: December 12, 1948
- Last service: September 30, 1970
- Former operator(s): Pennsylvania Railroad; From 1968: Penn Central

Route
- Termini: New York City, New York; St. Louis, Missouri
- Stops: 14
- Distance travelled: 1,050.6 miles (1,690.8 km) (1950)
- Average journey time: Eastbound: 21 hrs 10 min Westbound: 19 hrs 25 min (1950)
- Service frequency: Daily (1948–1970)
- Train number(s): Eastbound: 4 Westbound: 3

On-board services
- Seating arrangements: Reserved coach
- Sleeping arrangements: Roomettes and double bedrooms
- Catering facilities: Dining car
- Entertainment facilities: Club-Lounge
- Baggage facilities: Checked

Technical
- Rolling stock: Streamlined passenger cars by Pullman Standard
- Track gauge: 4 ft 8 1/2 in (1,435 mm)

The Penn Texas was a named passenger train of the Pennsylvania Railroad that ran from New York City's Pennsylvania Station to St. Louis' Union Station from 1948 to 1970. The train also had a branch from Harrisburg, Pennsylvania to Washington, D.C., via York, Pennsylvania and Baltimore, Maryland. The train offered sleeping cars that would run continuous to different Texas branches to El Paso, Houston and San Antonio over the Missouri Pacific's Texas Eagle. Accordingly, this service was the longest distance that an American railroad offered for through sleeper service to the east coast, with exception of trains running from California to New York. Coach passengers heading to Texas would need to change at St. Louis Union Station. Throughout this period, the Pennsylvania's competitor, the New York Central Railroad operated a competing Southwestern Limited which also offered sleeping cars which would hitch with Texas Eagle trains.

As premium ridership fell with relation to passenger travel on jet airlines, through sleeper service beyond St. Louis ended on June 30, 1961. The Penn Texas would survive the merger of the Pennsylvania Railroad with the New York Central Railroad creating Penn Central. However, declining ridership and the Penn Central's June 1970 filing for bankruptcy reorganization were followed by further cuts. Westbound trips from New York City to St. Louis ended on June 30, 1970 and the eastbound trips from St. Louis had their final run on September 30, 1970. (The New York Central's competing Southwestern Limited had ended its service four years earlier in 1966. The Pennsylvania Railroad's Spirit of St. Louis, another New York–St. Louis train (but which lacked linked cars with the Texas Eagle) continued until 1971, early in the Amtrak era.
