= Laredo station =

Former train station in Laredo, Texas

Laredo, TX
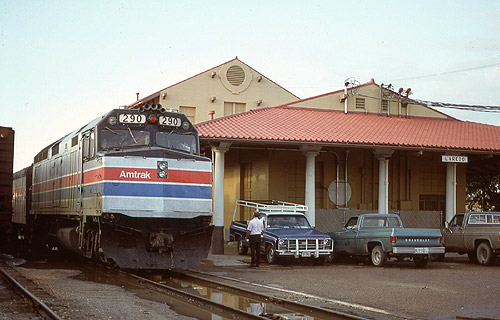
- Inter-American at Laredo in 1978

General information
- Location: 720 Santa Isabel Street; Laredo, Texas; United States
- Coordinates: 27°30′22″N 99°30′59″W
- Connections: Amtrak shuttle bus to Nuevo Laredo (1973-1981)

History
- Opened: 1913; January 27, 1973 (Amtrak)
- Closed: May 31, 1969 (MP); October 1, 1981 (Amtrak)
- Original company: International & Great Northern Railroad

Former services
| Preceding station | Amtrak | Following station |
|---|---|---|
| Terminus | Inter-American | San Antonio toward Chicago |
| Preceding station | Missouri Pacific Railroad | Following station |
| Terminus | Laredo – Palestine | Nye toward Palestine |
| Preceding station | N de M | Following station |
| Nuevo Laredo toward Buenavista | Águila Azteca Pre-1969 | Encinal toward San Antonio (U.S.) |
Location

Laredo station is a former Amtrak and Missouri Pacific passenger train depot in Laredo, Texas. The station was the southern terminus of the Inter-American, the last Amtrak train to serve Laredo, which ran from 1973 to 1981.

== History ==
The International & Great Northern Railroad (I&GN) reached Laredo in 1881 and constructed a lumber-frame depot.

By 1910 the original building was deteriorating, with locals calling it a "barn full of bats", and the I&GN promised a modern replacement. The railroad considered making it a union depot in partnership with the city's other three railroads, but that proposal did not materialize. Plans called for a large, two-story brick depot with passenger services and a restaurant on the first floor and offices on the second. By August 1912, the walls of the new building had been constructed. The depot opened in spring 1913 at a cost of about $35,000. It was the first depot in Texas to feature a wrap-around covered platform on all sides of the building. This is the structure that still stands today. The station was originally designed to be racially segregated, with separate facilities for black and white passengers.

The I&GN became part of the Missouri Pacific Railroad on March 1, 1956. Under the Missouri Pacific, Laredo station was served by the South Texas Eagle, a section of the Texas Eagle, with direct service to San Antonio, Austin, and St. Louis. Through-service on the Aztec Eagle was available to Nuevo Laredo and Mexico City, Mexico, operated by the Ferrocarriles Nacionales de México (N de M) across the Texas Mexican Railway International Bridge.

Service to Mexico ended in January 1969. The Texas Eagle was truncated at San Antonio on May 31, 1969, ending all passenger rail to Laredo.

=== Amtrak ===
Service to Laredo station resumed on January 27, 1973, when Amtrak established the Inter-American between Laredo and Fort Worth. The route was extended north to St. Louis in 1974, and further to Chicago in 1976. The train never provided direct service to Mexico, but passengers could self-transfer to N de M by crossing the border to Nuevo Laredo.

On October 1, 1981, Amtrak truncated the Inter-American to San Antonio and renamed it the Eagle (later the Texas Eagle). The move severed Laredo from the Amtrak network and ended service to the Missouri Pacific depot for the second and final time.

=== Later rail service in Laredo ===
Passenger rail service briefly returned to Laredo from 1986 to 1989 with the Tex-Mex Express to Corpus Christi, which stopped at a different station. The train only ran on summer weekends and did not connect to the national rail network.

== Architecture ==
When built, the current two-story depot building measured 345 feet (105 m) long, 75 feet (23 m), wide, and 59 feet (18 m) tall, including a central tower rising 22 feet (6.7 m) above the roof. Described as "compromised mission design", it was built with buff brick and reinforced concrete, and with a Spanish tile roof. Supported by colonnades, the roof's eaves extended far beyond the building on all sides to shelter waiting passengers.
