= Shreveport Central Railroad Station =

- Central Railroad Station
- U.S. National Register of Historic Places
- U.S. Historic district – Contributing property
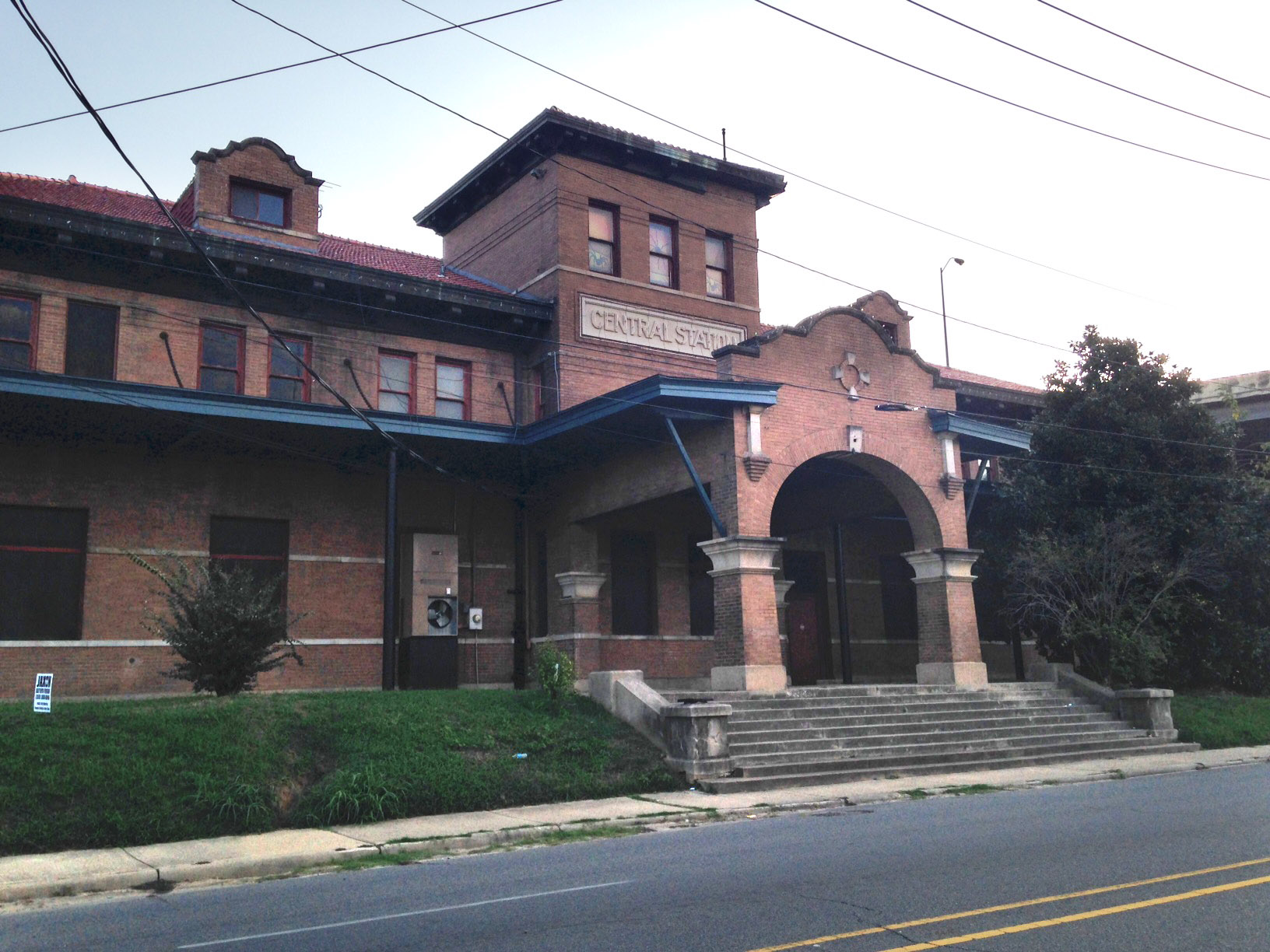

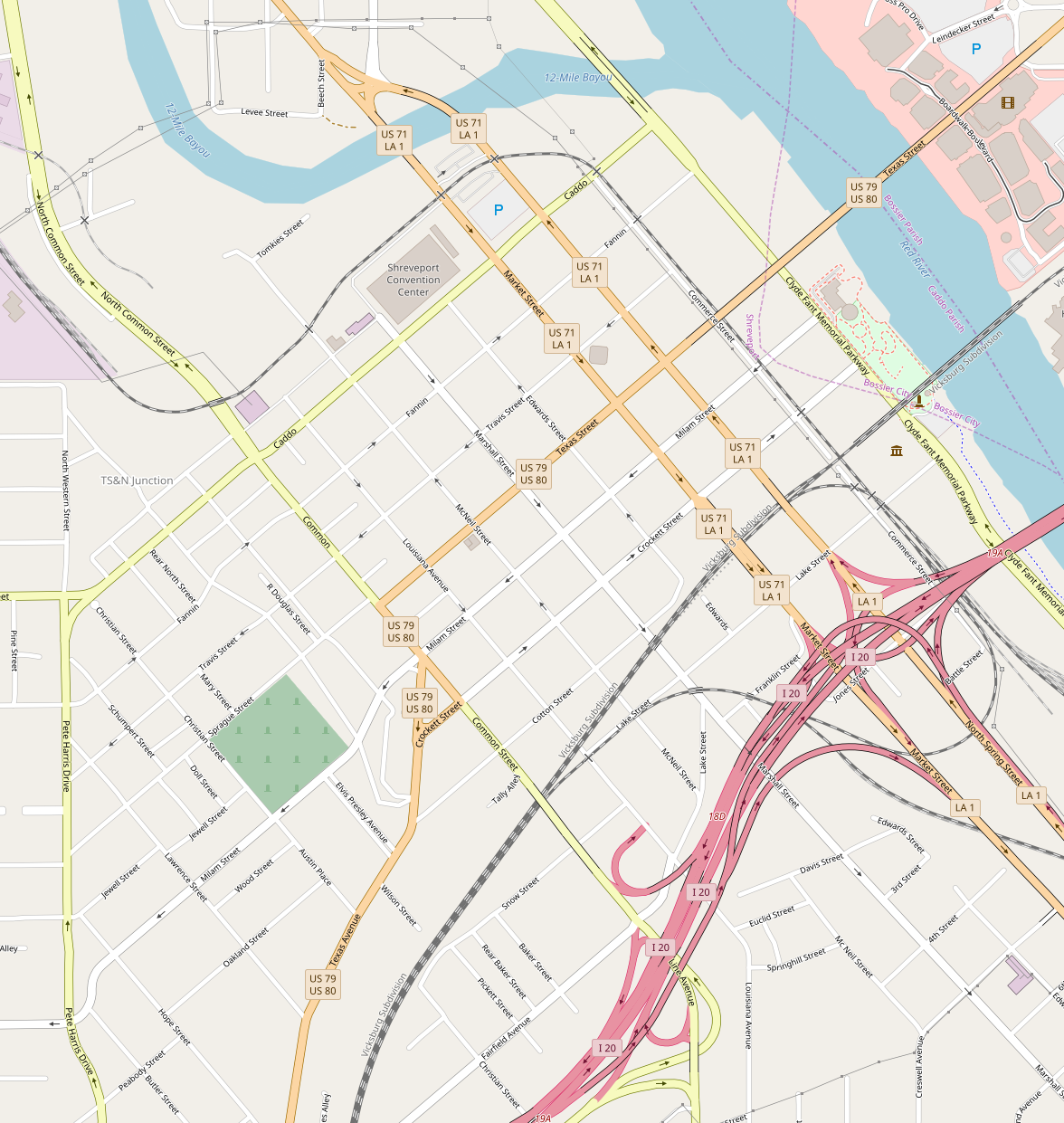
- Location within Shreveport Downtown
- Location: 1025 Marshall Street, Shreveport, Louisiana
- Coordinates: 32°30′32″N 93°44′43″W
- Area: 1.25 acres (0.51 ha)
- Built: 1910
- Architect: Louisiana and Arkansas Railroad
- Architectural style: Italian Renaissance, Mission/Spanish Colonial Revival
- Part of: Shreveport Commercial Historic District (ID82002760)
- NRHP reference No.: 91000622

Significant dates
- Added to NRHP: May 28, 1991
- Designated CP: April 29, 2015

Shreveport Central Station is a historic train station in Shreveport, Louisiana. It was built in 1910 by the Louisiana and Arkansas Railroad, a railroad that was eventually acquired by the Kansas City Southern Railway. (However, the KCS used Union Station ever since 1909.) By the opening of the 1940s the L&A and the St. Louis Southwestern Railway or 'Cotton Belt' moved its passenger operations from Central Station to Shreveport Union Station.

== Historical recognition ==
The building, along with an adjoining small freight depot shortly north of it, was listed on the National Register of Historic Places in 1991 as the Central Railroad Station. The building also became a contributing property of Shreveport Commercial Historic District when its boundaries were increased on April 29, 2015.

The former station currently survives as a gay bar and dance club.

== See also ==
- National Register of Historic Places listings in Caddo Parish, Louisiana

Preceding station	St. Louis Southwestern Railway	Following station
Terminus	Shreveport – Lewisville until 1940	Brownlee toward Lewisville
Preceding station	Kansas City Southern Railway	Following station
Lewis toward Kansas City	Main Line	Kingston toward Port Arthur
