= New Orleans station (Texas and Pacific Railway) =

Texas Pacific–Missouri Pacific Station
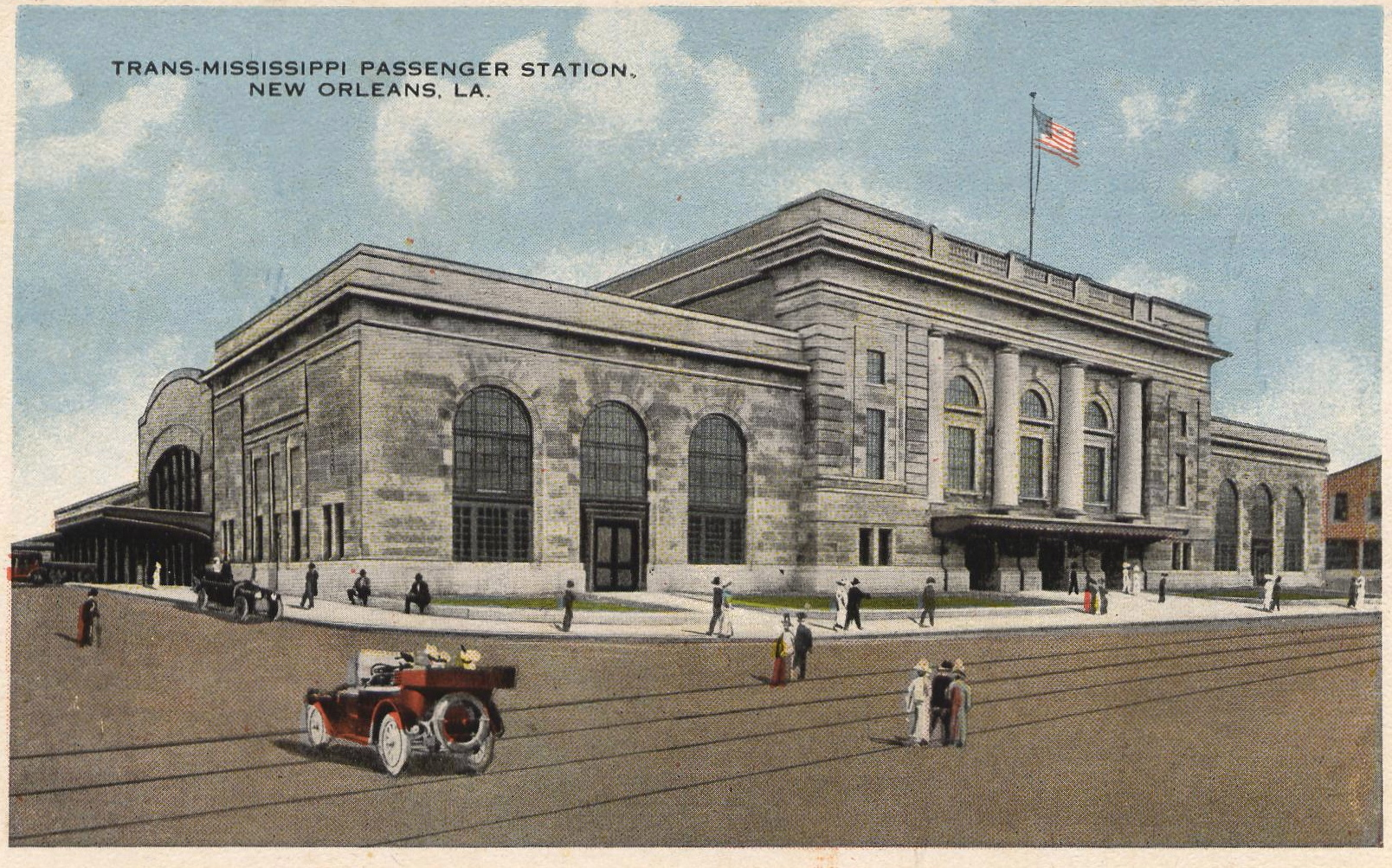
- Texas & Pacific Passenger Station

General information
- Location: Annunciation St. New Orleans, LA
- Coordinates: 29.9371°N 90.0684°W
- System: Passenger rail station
- Operator: Texas Pacific Railway

History
- Opened: 1916
- Closed: 1954

Former services
Preceding station	Missouri Pacific Railroad	Following station
Carrollton Avenue toward El Paso	Texas and Pacific Railway Main Line	Terminus
Carrollton Avenue toward Little Rock	Little Rock – New Orleans	Terminus
Location

The Texas and Pacific Railway (T&P) Station was constructed in 1916 on Annunciation Street in New Orleans. The station was located between Melpomene and Thalia streets. Prior to the construction of the Huey P. Long Bridge, the trains used a railroad ferry to cross the Mississippi River into Gretna. The trains then stopped at the 4th Street station to pick up West Bank passengers before leaving town.

The station was demolished in 1954 and replaced by the current New Orleans Union Passenger Terminal.
