= Texas and Pacific Railway =

Defunct railroad in the Western United States

Overview
- Headquarters: Marshall, Texas
- Reporting mark: TP
- Locale: Texas, Louisiana, Oklahoma, and Arkansas
- Dates of operation: 1871–1976
- Successor: Missouri Pacific

Technical
- Track gauge: 4 ft 8 1/2 in (1,435 mm) standard gauge

The Texas and Pacific Railway Company (known as the T&P) was created by federal charter in 1871 with the purpose of building a southern transcontinental railroad between Marshall, Texas, and San Diego, California. However its lines never went west of El Paso, near where in 1881 it connected to the Southern Pacific line to California.

== History ==
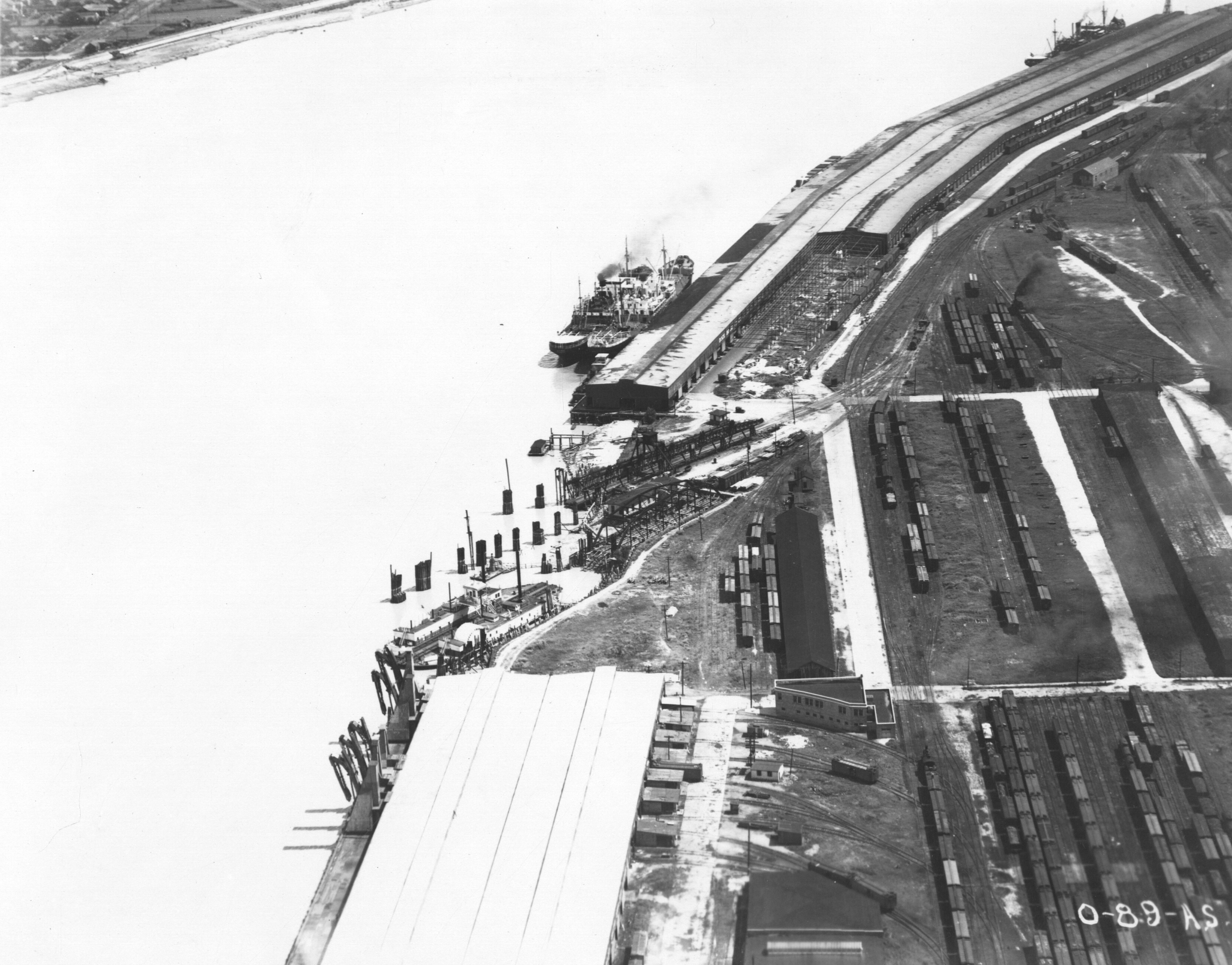
Texas & Pacific depot in New Orleans, 1922

Under the influence of General Buell, the T&P was originally to be 3 ft 6 in (1,067 mm) gauge, but this was overturned when the state legislature passed a law requiring 4 ft 8 1/2 in (1,435 mm) gauge.

The T&P had a significant foothold in Texas by the mid-1870s. Construction difficulties delayed westward progress, until American financier Jay Gould acquired an interest in the railroad in 1879. The T&P never reached San Diego; instead it met the Southern Pacific at Sierra Blanca, Texas, in 1881.

The Missouri Pacific Railroad, also controlled by Gould, leased the T&P from 1881 to 1885 and continued a cooperative relationship with the T&P after the lease ended. Missouri Pacific gained majority ownership of the Texas and Pacific Railway's stock in 1928, but allowed it to continue operation as a separate entity until they were eventually merged on October 15, 1976. On January 8, 1980, the Missouri Pacific Railroad was purchased by the Union Pacific Railroad. Because of lawsuits filed by competing railroads, the merger was not approved until September 13, 1982. Due to outstanding bonds of the Missouri Pacific, though, the actual merger with the Union Pacific Railroad took place on January 1, 1997.

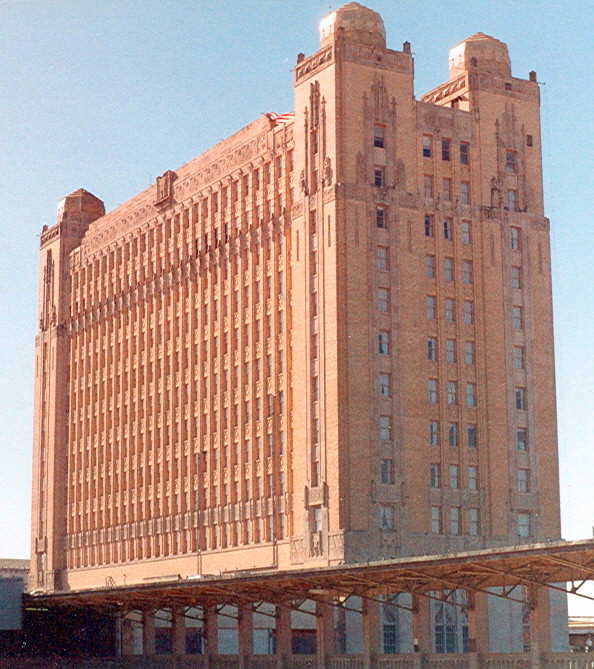
Texas & Pacific station and office building in Fort Worth, Texas

Several parts of the Texas and Pacific remain to this day, mainly two towering buildings, which help define the southern side of Fort Worth's skyline—the original station and office tower and a warehouse located immediately to the west. In 2001, the passenger platforms at the T&P station were put into use for the first time in decades as the westernmost terminus for the Trinity Railway Express, a commuter rail line connecting Fort Worth and Dallas. The T&P Warehouse still exists, but remains vacant with no plans to renovate it despite significant civic support and third-party developer interest. The passenger terminal and corporate offices have been converted into luxury condominiums.

=== Major named passenger trains of the Texas and Pacific ===
Major named passenger trains of the Texas and Pacific (route sections between St. Louis and Texarkana were operated by Missouri Pacific):

- Louisiana Eagle — New Orleans–Dallas–Fort Worth
- Southerner - St. Louis (north branch), Memphis, Tennessee (northeast branch), Alexandria, Louisiana (south branch) - El Paso
- Sunshine Special - St. Louis - El Paso and Laredo, Texas
- Texan - St. Louis - San Antonio and Houston
- Texas Eagle — St. Louis–various Texas points - western section going to El Paso, with connecting Southern Pacific service to Los Angeles; southwestern section to Laredo, with car change for Mexico City; southern section going to Houston
- Westerner — St. Louis–Dallas–El Paso—connection in El Paso for Southern Pacific service to Los Angeles

== Timeline ==
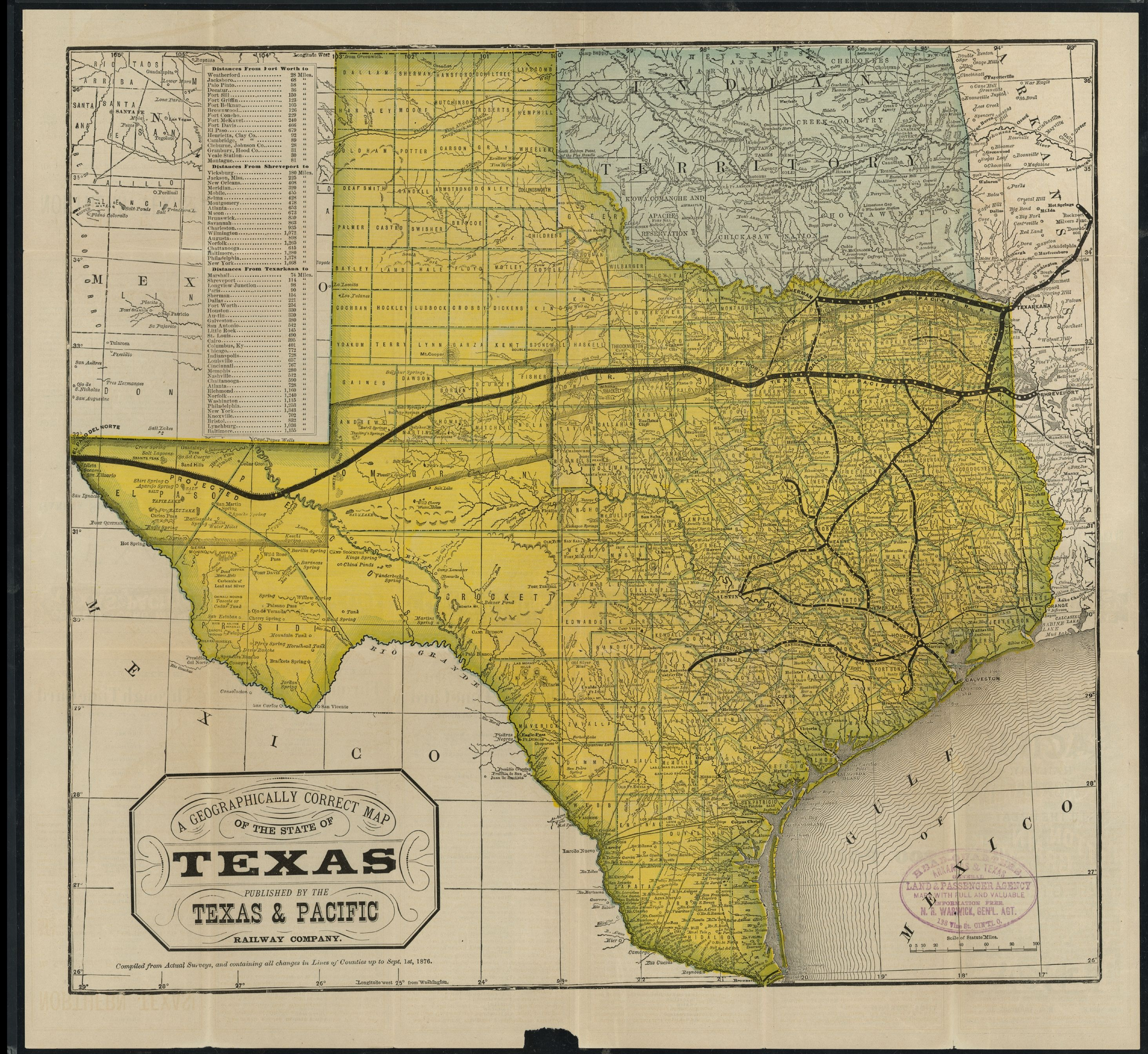
1878 map showing the Texas and Pacific Railway in Texas

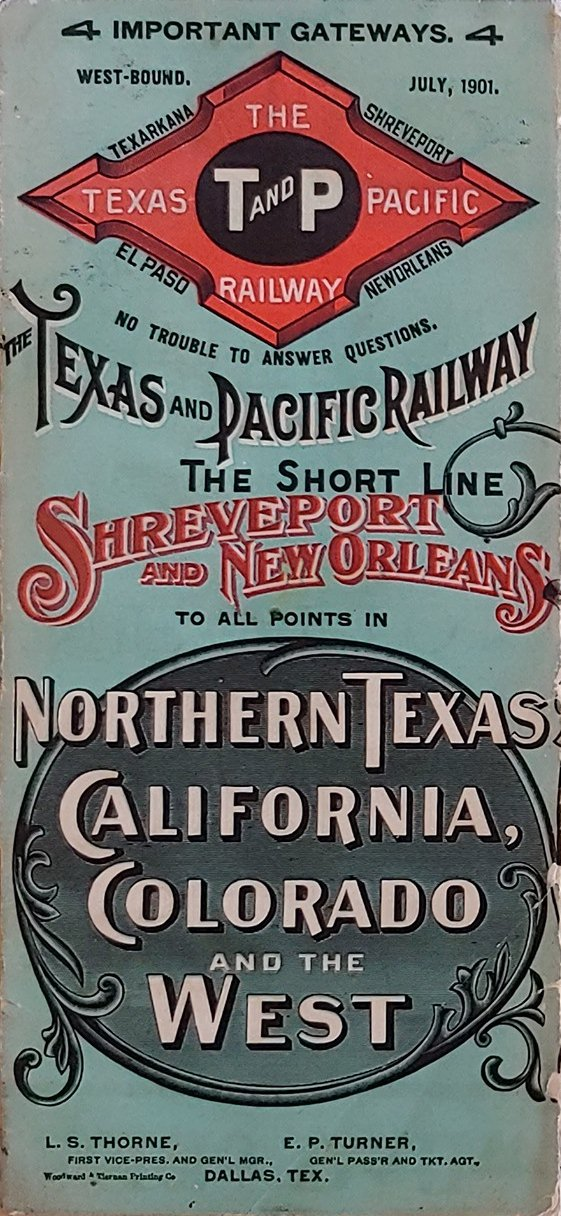
Cover Art of Texas and Pacific Railway Passenger Timetable of July 1901

- March 3, 1871 - United States Congress grants a charter to the Texas Pacific Railroad Company
- 1871 - Texas legislature charters the company and grant permission to purchase the Southern Trans-Continental Railway Company and the Southern Pacific Railroad Company. Note: This is a different Southern Pacific Railroad company from the one referred to above.
- March 21, 1872 - The Southern Pacific is purchased.
- March 30 - Southern Trans-Continental Railway Company is purchased.
- 1872 - Thomas A. Scott, president of the Pennsylvania Railroad, becomes president of the Texas & Pacific.
- May 2, 1872 - an Act of Congress changes the name to Texas and Pacific Railway Company
- June 12, 1873 - Memphis, El Paso and Pacific Railroad Company purchased.
- July 1, 1873 - First rail line opened between Longview, Texas, and Dallas, Texas
- December 28, 1873 - Rail line from Marshall, Texas, to Texarkana, Texas, placed in service.
- 1881 - Abilene, TX connected to the line.
- 1888 - Flooding in Louisiana due to the 1886/1887 hurricane season and crop failures in Texas due to drought caused T&P to go into bankruptcy. The bonds that were sold to pay for the construction of the rail lines could not be paid, so the court converted the land into an asset of a separate company, the Texas Pacific Land Trust.
- 1925 - Lima Locomotive Works delivers 2-10-4 locomotives to the T&P. The type is nicknamed "Texas" as a result.
- October 15, 1976 - merged with the Missouri Pacific

Revenue Freight Traffic (Millions of Net Ton-Miles)
	T&P	KO&G/KO&G of TX	Midland Valley	Cisco & Northeastern	Pecos Valley Southern	Texas Short Line
1925	1763	193	230	4	7	0.8
1933	1498	163	84	(with T&P)	(with T&P)	(with T&P)
1944	4761	412	113			
1960	4168	495	97			
1970	5854	150 (merged Apr 1970)	(merged 1967)			

"T&P" includes its subsidiary roads (A&S, D&PS, T-NM etc.); operated route-miles totalled 2259 at the end of 1929 (after C&NE, PVS and TSL had become subsidiaries) and 2033 at the end of 1960.

== Legal disputes ==
The Texas and Pacific was unable to finance construction to San Diego, and as a result the Southern Pacific was able to build from California to Sierra Blanca, Texas. In doing so, Southern Pacific used land designated for, and surveyed by Texas and Pacific, in its rail line from Yuma, Arizona, to El Paso, Texas. This resulted in lawsuits, which were settled with agreements to share tracks, and to cooperate in the building of new tracks. Most of the features advantageous to Texas and Pacific were later disallowed by legislation.

== Land grants ==
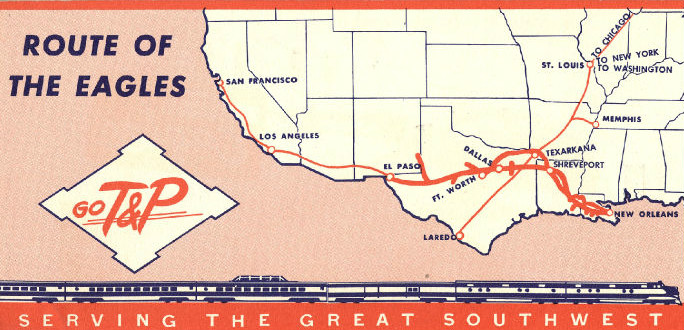
Route map of the railroad, circa 1950s (bold lines are T&P; thin lines denote connecting service for Eagle passenger trains)

From 1873 to 1881 the Texas and Pacific built a total of 972 miles (1,560 km) of track; as a result it was entitled to land grants totalling 12,441,600 acres (50,349 km^{2}). T&P, however, received land only for the construction of track east of Fort Worth. This meant the firm received only 5,173,120 acres (20,935 km^{2}). The State of Texas did not award the additional area because, it said, the construction had not been completed within the time required by the firm's charter. The then state Attorney General Charles A. Culberson filed suit to recover 301,893 acres (1,222 km^{2}) on the grounds that "the road had been granted land partly on sidetracks and partly on land not subject to location." The state ultimately recovered 256,046 acres (1,036 km^{2}) giving a net grant to the T&P of 4,917,074 acres (19,899 km^{2}), or 7,683 square miles. By comparison, the state of Connecticut is 5,543 square miles (14,356 km^{2}).

== Surviving Steam Locomotives ==
Number	Build Date	Builder	Class	Wheel Type	Notes	Photo
316	1901	Cooke Locomotive Works	D-9	4-6-0	Sold to the Paris and Mount Pleasant Railroad in 1949. Donated to Abilene, Texas in 1951. Donated again to the Texas State Railroad in 1974 and was renumbered to 201. The locomotive was taken out of service at the end of the 2013 season. It is currently on display outside the Palestine engine house awaiting a possible restoration to service.	
400	1915	Baldwin Locomotive Works	E-4A1	2-8-2	Originally Fort Worth and Denver City Railway 410. It was sold to the Texas and Pacific Railway in 1958 to help pull freight trains through the flooded waters of the Red River. The locomotive suffered a mechanical breakdown and was donated to Marshall, Texas in 1963. The locomotive was unfortunately vandalized, and many of the original hardware was stolen from the locomotive (bell, headlight, backlight, classification lanterns, and many more items). In 2008, the locomotive was moved to the Texas and Pacific Railway Museum, put on display and received a cosmetic restoration. The locomotive still remains on display today.	
610	1927	Lima Locomotive Works	I-1a	2-10-4	Donated to Fort Worth, Texas in 1951. In 1975, the locomotive was selected to pull the American Freedom Train. The locomotive was restored to operation in 1976 and pulled the AFT throughout Texas. Afterwards, the Southern Railway leased the 610 to pull excursion trains. In 1981, the locomotive returned to Texas. In 1982, it moved to the Texas State Railroad where it currently remains today on static display.	

== Texas Pacific Land Trust ==
The Texas Pacific Land Trust (NYSE: TPL) was created in 1888 in the wake of the bankruptcy of the T&P in order to provide an efficient and orderly way to sell the railway's land, receiving at the time in excess of 3.5 million acres (14,000 km^{2}). As of 31 December 2006 the Trust was still the largest private land owner in the state of Texas, owning the surface estate of 966,392 acres (3,911 km^{2}) spread across 20 counties in the western part of the state. The Trust also generates income from oil & gas royalties through its 1/128 non-participating royalty interest under 85,414 acres (346 km^{2}) and 1/16 non-participating royalty interest under 386,988 acres (1,566 km^{2}).

== See also ==
- Texas and Pacific Railroad Depot (Bunkie, Louisiana)
- Texas and Pacific Railroad Depot (Marshall, Texas) and Texas and Pacific Railway Museum
- T&P Station in Fort Worth, Texas
- Texas and Pacific 610 steam locomotive engine
- Texas and Pacific (song)
- Silver Slipper rubber-tired two-car train
- Amtrak's Texas Eagle
