= Texas Eagle (MP train) =

American passenger train from St. Louis to Texas, 1948–1971

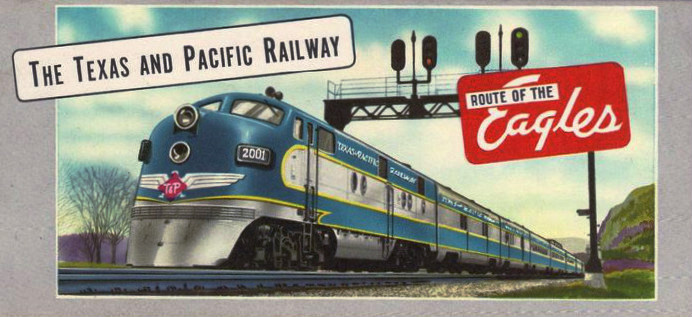
- A Texas and Pacific EMD E7 leads an Eagle in this 1950s ticket cover.

Overview
- Service type: Inter-city rail
- Status: Discontinued
- Locale: Midwestern United States/Southwestern United States
- First service: August 15, 1948
- Last service: April 30, 1971
- Successor: Inter-American (train)
- Former operators: Missouri Pacific Railroad; Texas and Pacific Railway

Route
- Termini: St. Louis, Missouri; El Paso, Texas; San Antonio, Texas; Galveston, Texas; Mexico City
- Stops: 45 (St. Louis–El Paso); 37 (El Paso–St. Louis); 18 (St. Louis–San Antonio); 17 (San Antonio–St. Louis); 23 (St. Louis–Galveston); 21 (Galveston–St. Louis)
- Average journey time: 29 hours 45 minutes (St. Louis–El Paso); 30 hours 20 minutes (El Paso–St. Louis); 18 hours 10 minutes (St. Louis–San Antonio); 18 hours 31 minutes (St. Louis–Galveston); 18 hours 20 minutes (Galveston–St. Louis)
- Service frequency: Daily
- Train numbers: 1 (St. Louis–El Paso); 2 (El Paso–St. Louis); 21-221-21 (St. Louis–San Antonio); 22-222-22 (San Antonio–St. Louis); 21-221-21-25 (St. Louis–Galveston); 26-22-222-22 (Galveston–St. Louis)

On-board services
- Seating arrangements: Reclining seat coach
- Sleeping arrangements: roomettes, double bedrooms; carried-over slumbercoach transferring at St. Louis from the National Limited (1961)

Technical
- Track gauge: 4 ft 8 1/2 in (1,435 mm)
- Operating speed: 45.6 mph (St. Louis–El Paso); 44.7 mph (El Paso–St. Louis); 50.8 mph (St. Louis–San Antonio); 46.7 mph (St. Louis–Galveston); 47.2 mph (Galveston–St. Louis)
- Track owner: Missouri Pacific Railroad

The Texas Eagle was an American streamlined passenger train operated by the Missouri Pacific Railroad and the Texas and Pacific Railway between St. Louis, Missouri, and multiple destinations in the state of Texas. It operated from 1948 to 1971. The Texas Eagle was one of many trains discontinued when Amtrak began operations in 1971, although Amtrak would revive service over the Missouri Pacific with the Inter-American in 1974. This train was renamed the Eagle in 1981 and finally the Texas Eagle in 1988.

== History ==
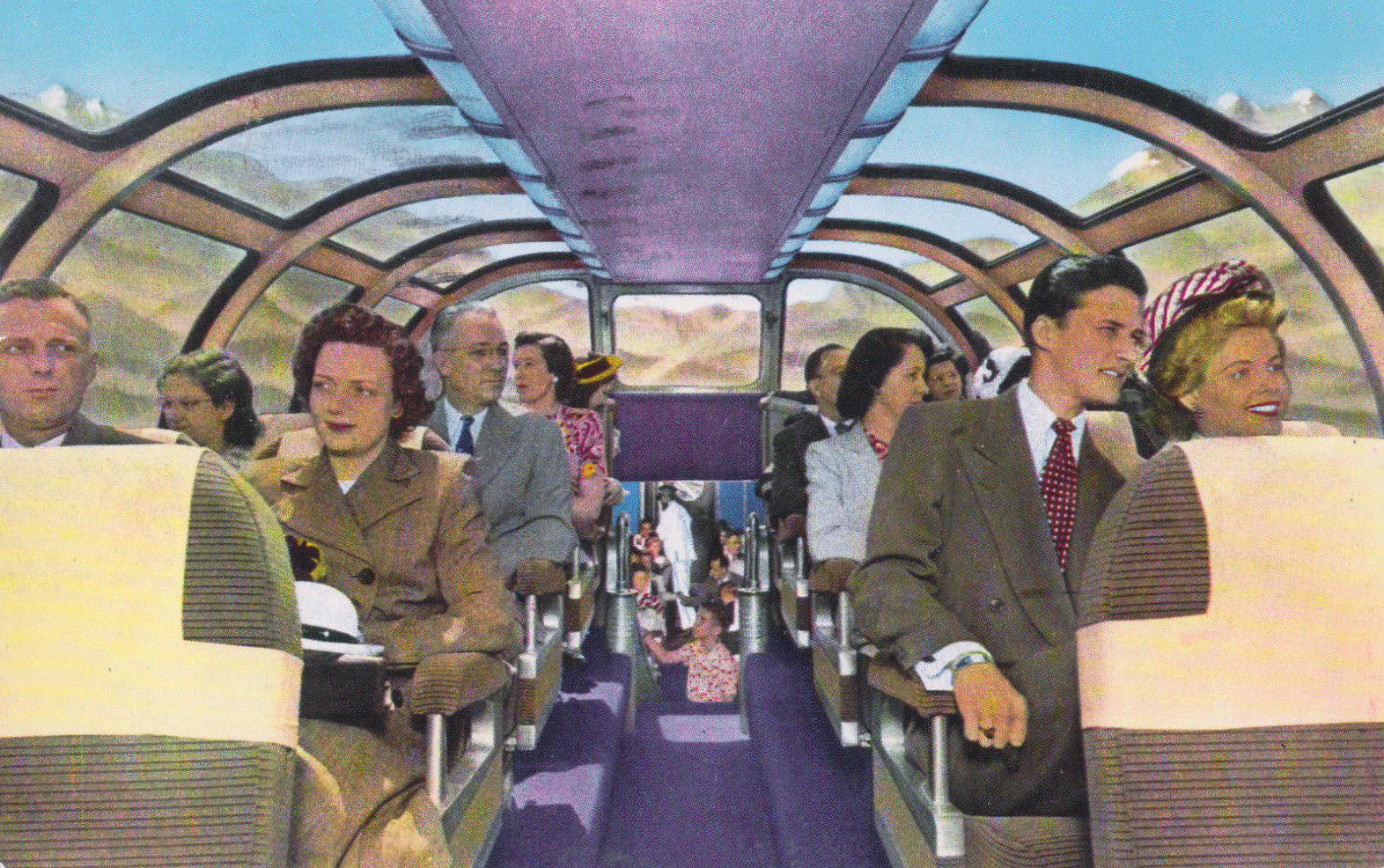
Planetarium Dome coaches were featured equipment on the Texas Eagle.

The Texas Eagle began on August 15, 1948, with the renaming of the Sunshine Special. For thirteen years, the Texas Eagle operated as two separate sections, leaving St. Louis in the late afternoon, one following behind the other at an approximately 10-minute interval. At Longview, the routes diverged. The west Texas section continued to Dallas and El Paso, while the south Texas section split off cars for Houston and Galveston at Palestine, then operated to Austin and San Antonio. In 1952, dome cars were added to the train. After 1961, the Texas Eagle was consolidated as a single, very long train, between St. Louis and Longview, Texas, where the train was split into several sections, each serving different Texas cities. The west Texas section (the West Texas Eagle) of the Texas Eagle continued from Longview to Dallas, Fort Worth, and El Paso; the south Texas section (South Texas Eagle) served Palestine, Austin, San Antonio, and Laredo. A third section of the Texas Eagle split from the main train at Palestine, providing service to Houston.

While at its northern end, the Texas Eagle served St. Louis, as noted above, it also had another section that split off at Little Rock, going east towards Memphis. This section was discontinued in August 1965.

On December 12, 1948, a few months after its inception the Texas Eagle carried through sleepers from the Pennsylvania Railroad's Penn Texas, providing a one-seat ride from Washington, D.C., and New York City to Texas. Through sleeper service ended on June 30, 1961, but it was still possible to make a connection between the two trains in St. Louis.

The western section ended May 31, 1969, leaving a San Antonio–St. Louis service. The Missouri Pacific discontinued the remaining Texas intrastate segment of the Texas Eagle on September 22, 1970. The Missouri Pacific bypassed the Interstate Commerce Commission by arguing (to the Texas Railroad Commission) that the "Texas Eagle" was not an interstate train but rather three intrastate trains: one which ran San Antonio–Texarkana, another which ran from Texarkana to the Missouri border, and a third which ran from the Missouri border to St. Louis. The Texas Railroad Commission accepted this argument and permitted the Missouri Pacific to end the Texas portion of the Texas Eagle. The Texas Railroad Commission ruling was handed down less than a month before President Nixon signed Railpax legislation which placed a moratorium on passenger train discontinuances in anticipation of the start-up of Amtrak. The St. Louis–Texarkana truncation of the Texas Eagle continued running until the advent of Amtrak on May 1, 1971, when it was discontinued.

=== International service ===
From its beginning, into the latter 1960s, the South Texas Eagle had cars that continued from Laredo, Texas, where a connection was made to the Aztec Eagle for Nuevo Laredo and Mexico City, operated by the Ferrocarriles Nacionales de México. Likewise, there were through Pullman sleepers continuing to Mexico City.

== Sample consist ==
The December 1952 edition of the Official Guide of the Railways listed the following for a southbound Texas Eagle:

Type	Seating	Route	Notes
No. 1 : St. Louis—Fort Worth—El Paso
Sleeper	14 roomettes, 1 drawing room, 2 double bedrooms	St. Louis—Fort Worth	
Sleeper	14 roomettes, 4 double bedrooms	New York—El Paso	Conveyed New York—St. Louis by the Pennsylvania Railroad
Sleeper	14 roomettes, 4 double bedrooms	Washington—Fort Worth	Conveyed Washington—St. Louis by the Baltimore and Ohio Railroad
Sleeper	14 roomettes, 4 double bedrooms	Memphis—Fort Worth	Conveyed Memphis—Little Rock by No. 201
Sleeper	Roomettes and bedrooms	Dallas—Los Angeles	Conveyed El Paso—Los Angeles by the Southern Pacific Railroad
Lounge	5 bedrooms	St. Louis—Fort Worth	
Diner		St. Louis—Fort Worth	
Coach		St. Louis—El Paso	
Coach		St. Louis—Fort Worth	Planetarium dome
Coach		Memphis—Fort Worth	Conveyed Memphis—Little Rock by No. 201
Type	Seating	Route	Notes
No. 21 : St. Louis—Palestine—Houston/San Antonio
Sleeper	14 roomettes, 1 drawing room, 2 double bedrooms	St. Louis—Galveston	
Sleeper	14 roomettes, 4 double bedrooms	Memphis—Houston	Conveyed Memphis—Little Rock by No. 201
Sleeper	10 roomettes, 6 double bedrooms	Washington—Houston	Conveyed Washington—St. Louis by the Pennsylvania Railroad
Sleeper	10 roomettes, 6 double bedrooms	New York—Houston	Conveyed New York—St. Louis by the Pennsylvania Railroad
Sleeper	10 roomettes, 6 double bedrooms	New York—San Antonio	Conveyed New York—St. Louis by the Pennsylvania Railroad
Sleeper	14 roomettes, 4 double bedrooms	St. Louis—San Antonio	
Sleeper	14 roomettes, 4 double bedrooms	St. Louis—San Antonio	
Diner lounge		St. Louis—Houston	
Diner lounge		St. Louis—San Antonio	
Coach		St. Louis—Houston	
Coach		St. Louis—Corpus Christi	Conveyed Houston—Odem by No. 11; Odem—Corpus Christi by No. 205
Coach		St. Louis—San Antonio	Planetarium dome
Coach		St. Louis—San Antonio	
Coach		St. Louis—San Antonio	
Coach		St. Louis—San Antonio	
Coach		Houston—Galveston	
Type	Seating	Route	Notes
No. 201 : Memphis—Little Rock
Sleeper	14 roomettes, 4 double bedrooms	Memphis—Fort Worth	Conveyed Little Rock—Fort Worth by No. 1
Sleeper	14 roomettes, 4 double bedrooms	Memphis—Houston	Conveyed Little Rock—Houston by No. 21
Coach		Memphis—Little Rock	
Coach		Memphis—Fort Worth	Conveyed Little Rock—Fort Worth by No. 1

== See also ==
- Penn Texas, a connecting Pennsylvania Railroad service from St. Louis' Union Station
- Texas Eagle, a successor service operated by Amtrak
