= Fordyce station (St. Louis Southwestern Railway) =

- Cotton Belt Railroad Depot--Fordyce
- U.S. National Register of Historic Places
- U.S. Historic district – Contributing property
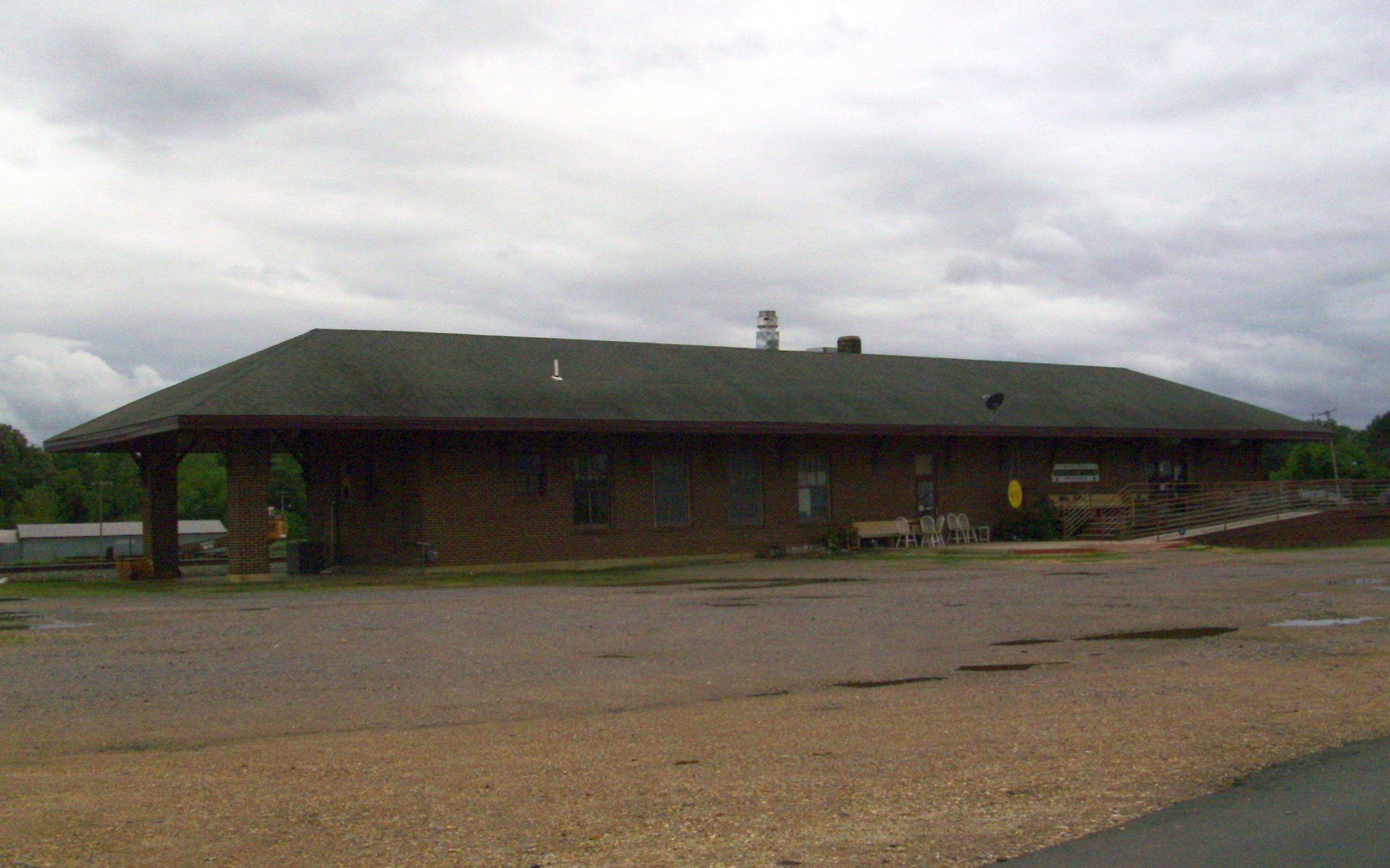

- Location within Arkansas Location within the United States
- Location: SW corner of Main and First Sts., Fordyce, Arkansas
- Coordinates: 33°48′39″N 92°24′43″W
- Area: less than one acre
- Built: 1925
- Built by: Cotton Belt Railroad
- Architectural style: Late 19th And 20th Century Revivals, Bungalow/craftsman, Mediterranean
- Part of: Fordyce Commercial Historic District (ID92000608)
- MPS: Historic Railroad Depots of Arkansas MPS
- NRHP reference No.: 92000608

Significant dates
- Added to NRHP: June 11, 1992
- Designated CP: June 11, 1992

The Cotton Belt Railroad Depot is a historic railroad station at the junction of Main and 1st Streets in downtown Fordyce, Arkansas. The single-story brick building was built c. 1925 by the St. Louis Southwestern Railway, also commonly known as the Cotton Belt Railroad. The building is predominantly Craftsman in its styling, with extended eaves that have elaborately styled brackets.

The building was listed on the National Register of Historic Places in 1992.

The station used to host the Morning Star and Lone Star until these trains were replaced by unnamed trains.

Also near the station is a preserved steam locomotive, Tennessee, Alabama and Georgia 101.

Preceding station	St. Louis Southwestern Railway	Following station
Thornton toward Gatesville	Main Line	Rison toward St. Louis

== See also ==
- National Register of Historic Places listings in Dallas County, Arkansas
