= Memphis Union Station =

Former intercity railroad station in Memphis, Tennessee, U.S.

Coordinates: 35.13243631955451°N 90.0559899247141°W

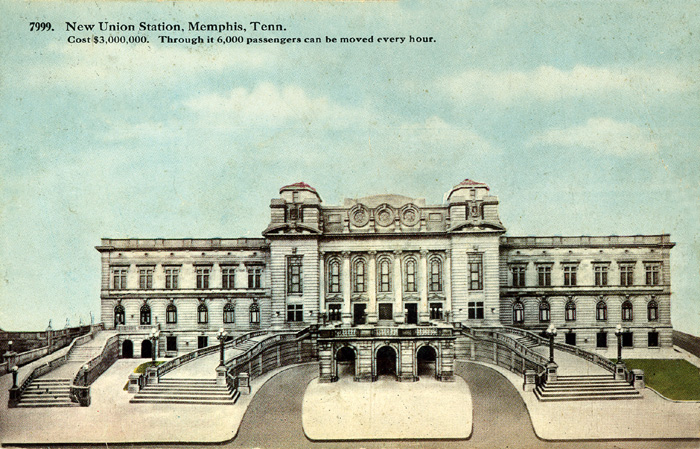
- Memphis Union Station postcard issued soon after the station opened in April 1912

General information
- Lines: Missouri Pacific Railroad, St. Louis Southwestern Railway, Louisville and Nashville Railroad, Nashville, Chattanooga and St. Louis Railway, Southern Railway

History
- Opened: 1902
- Closed: 1969

Key dates
- 1969: demolished

Former services
Preceding station	Louisville and Nashville Railroad	Following station
Terminus	Memphis – Bowling Green	Leewood toward Bowling Green
Preceding station	Missouri Pacific Railroad	Following station
West Memphis toward St. Louis	St. Louis – Memphis	Terminus
West Memphis toward Bald Knob	Bald Knob – Memphis	Terminus
Preceding station	Nashville, Chattanooga and St. Louis Railway	Following station
Terminus	Main Line	K.C. Junction toward Atlanta
Preceding station	Southern Railway	Following station
Terminus	Memphis – Bristol	Buntyn toward Bristol
Preceding station	St. Louis Southwestern Railway	Following station
West Memphis toward Brinkley	Brinkley – Memphis	Terminus
Location

Memphis Union Station was a passenger terminal in Memphis, Tennessee. It served as a hub between railroads of the Southwest, the Missouri Pacific Railroad and the St. Louis Southwestern Railway, and railroads of the Southeast, the Louisville and Nashville Railroad, the Nashville, Chattanooga and St. Louis Railway and the Southern Railway. The terminal, completed in 1912, was built in the Beaux-Arts style and was located on Calhoun Street, between south Second Street and Rayburn Boulevard (now south Third Street). It was demolished in 1969. This location in south Memphis was approximately two blocks east of the other major Memphis railroad terminal, Memphis Grand Central Station.

== History ==
Memphis Union Station Company was chartered in Tennessee on September 25, 1909, for the purpose of operating Union Station. Construction of the facility began in April 1910, and the new station opened for service on April 1, 1912. The station was designed by architect J.A. Galvin, with Walter F. Schultz serving as engineer of construction. The architectural design of the station was a source of pride for Memphis, and the main building was the largest stone structure in the city.

Memphis Union Station's purpose was to unite the passenger and express operations of the major railway lines that terminated in or travelled through Memphis, principally between east and west. Traffic between the north and the south was generally carried by the Illinois Central Railroad, whose operations at Memphis were large enough to justify a separate Central Station two blocks to the west of Union Station.

The terminal tracks were of a stub-end design, meaning that all trains had to back into the station from the main line tracks via a wye to reach the station's platforms. The station also had additional tracks for storage and servicing of passenger cars as well as a roundhouse and turntable, allowing locomotives to be serviced on site.

This configuration served the primary objective of the "western lines," such as the Cotton Belt (and its parent company, Southern Pacific), the Rock Island, and Missouri Pacific were fully occupied serving all of the above named gateways. So Memphis held very little interest to them as a source of long-distance passenger revenue.

As passenger train traffic declined after World War II, studies were done on consolidating all Memphis train operations in either Union Station or Central Station. However, the various railroads could never agree on consolidation arrangements, and Memphis Union Station continued in operation into the early 1960s.

== Major named passenger trains ==
Several named passenger trains stopped there during the golden years of rail.

- Louisville and Nashville:
  - Humming Bird to Cincinnati, Ohio
  - Pan-American (train) to Cincinnati
- Missouri Pacific:
  - Texas Eagle (to Laredo, Texas via San Antonio, and another section to Galveston, Texas via Houston)
- Nashville, Chattanooga and St. Louis Railway:
  - City of Memphis to Nashville, Tennessee
- Southern Railway:
  - Tennessean (to Washington, DC, via Huntsville, Alabama and Chattanooga, Tennessee)
- St. Louis and Southwestern (Cotton Belt):
  - Lone Star (to Dallas, Texas via Texarkana)
  - Morning Star (to Dallas via Texarkana)

== Demise ==
St. Louis Southwestern Railway discontinued passenger service to Memphis in October 1952, and Nashville, Chattanooga and St. Louis Railway merged into Louisville and Nashville Railroad (L&N) in 1957, effectively reducing the number of tenants in Memphis Union Station from five to three. In early 1964, Missouri Pacific Railroad served notice that their last passenger train serving Memphis would be moved from Union Station into a former freight station on west Calhoun Street. The Missouri Pacific benefitted from being a foreign (not otherwise doing business in Tennessee) corporation in Tennessee, once its petition before the Interstate Commerce Commission (ICC) was heard, to cease operation of passenger service to Memphis, it could rely upon legal precedent (as when Gulf, Mobile & Ohio, ended service south of St. Louis, and thereby voiding its joint agreement to fund New Orleans' Union Station) to void its joint agreement to support the operation of Memphis Union Station.

The remaining two tenant railroads in Memphis Union Station were unwilling to assume the full burden for maintenance and operation of the station, as the remaining passenger and express freight revenues of these carriers into Memphis brought in far less revenue than the continued operation of the station required. Louisville and Nashville Railroad made arrangements to become a tenant at Memphis Central Station, and Southern Railway returned to their ancient freight station on Lauderdale Street. Memphis Union Station was closed on April 1, 1964, fifty-two years to the day from the time the station had opened with great fanfare.

A prolonged court battle ensued, with the City of Memphis claiming that Union Station had been abandoned without the approval of the Tennessee Public Service Commission. After appeals courts ruled against the railroads, both L&N and Southern were forced to re-open part of Union Station on December 1, 1966. Missouri Pacific had successfully discontinued their last Memphis passenger service, a Memphis to Little Rock connecting train, in August 1965, and was thus not affected by the order to re-open Memphis Union Station.

Passenger traffic into Memphis on both the L&N and Southern was negligible, and the added expense of reopening Union Station caused both roads to initiate train discontinuance proceedings. These efforts were eventually successful, and Union Station was again closed for a second and final time on March 30, 1968, following the departure of the last Southern Railway passenger train from Memphis. The Memphis Union Station property was sold to the United States Postal Service for construction of a new mail sorting facility, and the station was demolished by February 1969.
