= Great Southern Hotel =

Great Southern Hotel may refer to:

- Great Southern Hotels, a defunct Irish hotel chain
- Rusher Hotel, a historic building in Brinkley, Arkansas
- Yue Hwa Building, a historic building in Chinatown, Singapore
