= Amigo, Texas =

Ghost town in Texas, US

Amigo is a ghost town in Smith County, Texas, United States. Situated on the St. Louis Southwestern Railway, it had a peak population of 40 in 1940. The population declined after World War II and was abandoned by the 1960s.
