= Nashville, Chattanooga and St. Louis Railway =

Defunct railway company in the southeastern United States (1851–1957)

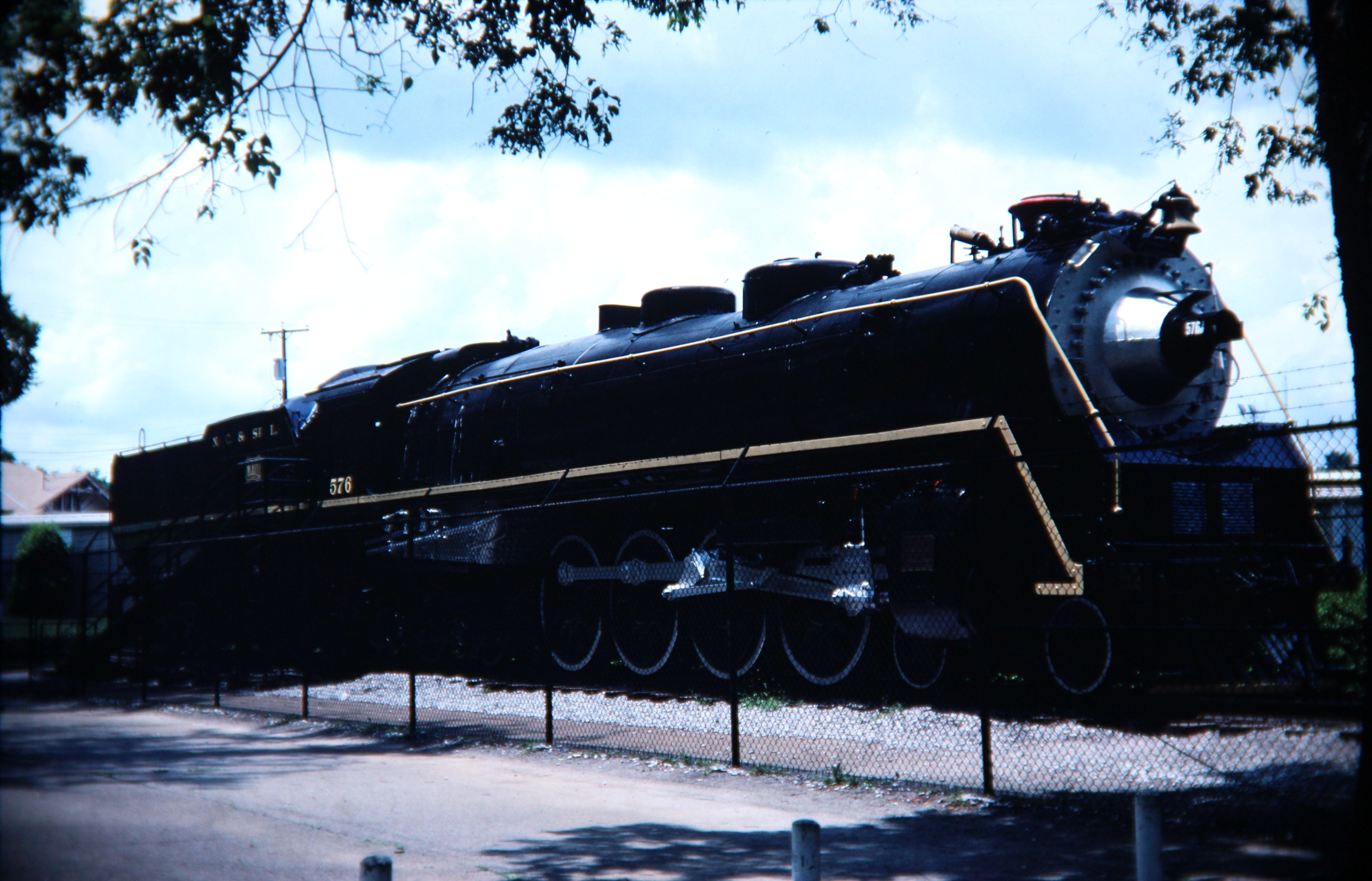
- NC&StL steam locomotive No. 576 on static display at Centennial Park, Nashville, Tennessee

Overview
- Headquarters: Nashville, Tennessee
- Reporting mark: NC&StL
- Locale: Kentucky, Tennessee, Alabama, Georgia
- Dates of operation: 1851–1957
- Predecessor: Nashville and Chattanooga Railroad
- Successor: Louisville and Nashville Railroad

Technical
- Track gauge: 4 ft 8 1/2 in (1,435 mm) standard gauge
- Previous gauge: 5 ft (1,524 mm) and 4 ft 9 in (1,448 mm)
- Length: 1900: 1,189 miles (1,914 km)

The Nashville, Chattanooga and St. Louis Railway (reporting mark NC&StL) was a railway company that operated in the U.S. states of Kentucky, Tennessee, Alabama, and Georgia. It began as the Nashville and Chattanooga Railroad, chartered in Nashville on December 11, 1845, built to 5 ft (1,524 mm) gauge and was the first railway to operate in the state of Tennessee. By the turn of the twentieth century, the NC&StL grew into one of the most important railway systems in the southern United States.

== History ==
The Nashville & Chattanooga Railway, predecessor to the NC&StL Railway, was organized in 1848 by a group of prominent Nashville businessmen. The line's first president was Vernon K. Stevenson, who was connected to wealth from the Grundy and Bass families of Nashville and was a vigorous promotor of a line between Nashville and Chattanooga; he would serve for 16 years. The first locomotive in Nashville arrived in December 1850 on the steamboat Beauty along with 13 freight cars and one passenger car. The train made its first trip the following spring: 11 miles (18 km) to Antioch, Tennessee. It took nine years to complete the 150 miles (240 km) of line between Nashville and Chattanooga, made difficult by the steep elevations of the Highland Rim and Cumberland Plateau between them. The 2,228-foot (679 m) Cowan Tunnel near Cowan, Tennessee, was considered an engineering marvel of the time. Due to terrain difficulties, the rail line crossed into Alabama and Georgia for short distances. Towns sprang up during construction, including Tullahoma and Estill Springs.

During the Civil War, the rail line was strategic to both the Union and Confederate armies. The Tennessee campaigns of 1862 and 1863 saw Union troops force the Confederates from Nashville all the way to Chattanooga, down the line of the railroad. The tracks and bridges were repeatedly damaged and repaired, and the rolling stock was largely destroyed. At different times the trains carried supplies for both armies. In 1885, the railroad successfully defended itself before the Supreme Court in Nashville, C. & St. L. R. Co. v. United States from repaying postage payments for mail in 1861 that was not delivered because of the war.

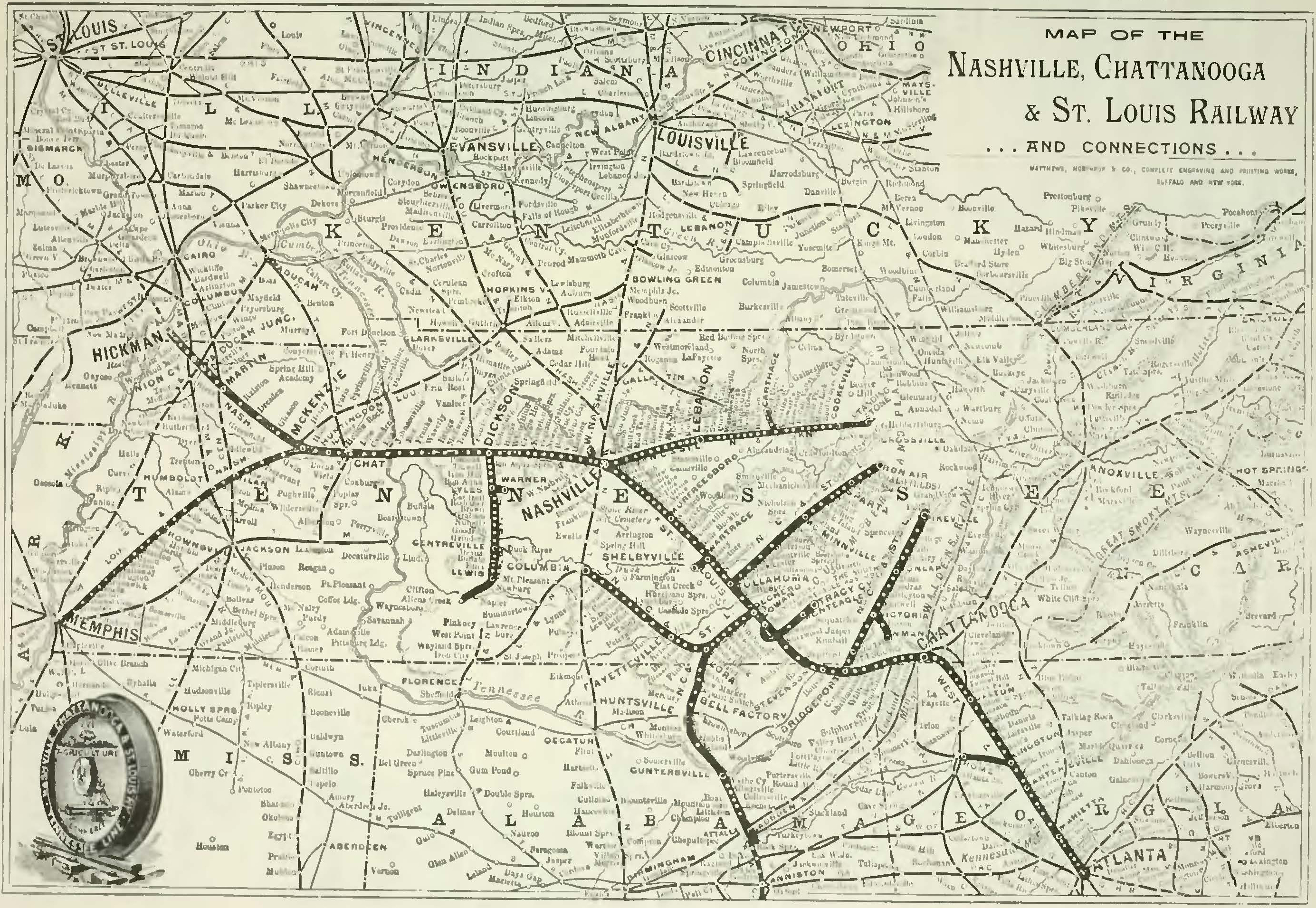
NC&StL system map, 1893

After the war, the company purchased the Nashville and Northwestern Railroad and the Hickman and Obion Railroad to Hickman, Kentucky, to reach the Mississippi River. In 1873, it was reincorporated as the Nashville, Chattanooga and St. Louis Railway (NC&StL); the company's tracks never actually reached St. Louis, Missouri, in the north. In early 1877, the NC&StL bought the bankrupt Tennessee and Pacific Railroad from the state government and operated it as a connection to Lebanon, Tennessee.

The company also took full control of the Duck River Valley Narrow Gauge Railway in 1888, converting it to standard gauge the following year. It had already leased the line, which linked Columbia, Lewisburg, and Fayetteville, Tennessee from its owners in 1879, when they had difficulty completing the final stretch into Fayetteville.

The railroad's only heavy repair shops for locomotives and cars were located in Nashville, Tennessee. The first roundhouse and machine shop were built in 1850, which were expanded by Confederate troops during the Civil War. By 1888 the shops had become obsolete and inadequate, so they were moved to a larger tract of land two miles west, below Charlotte Avenue. The new shops featured a full-circle roundhouse and a dozen shop buildings served by two transfer tables.

The Louisville and Nashville Railroad, an aggressive competitor of the NC&StL, gained a controlling interest in 1880 through a hostile stock takeover that caused much rancor between the cities of Nashville and Louisville. However, the railroads continued to operate separately until finally merging in 1957. The company gave up steam operations in 1953. After the 1880 takeover, the NC&StL acquired branch lines in Kentucky and Alabama, and expanded from Nashville to Memphis. In 1890 the tracks reached Atlanta, Georgia, by leasing the state-owned Western and Atlantic Railroad.

In 1902, the L&N was acquired by the Atlantic Coast Line Railroad in a takeover similar to that of the NC&StL, but continued to operate as a separate company. In 1982, the L&N's corporate existence ended when it was merged into ACL's successor, the Seaboard System Railroad. After several other mergers, in 1986 the Seaboard System was renamed CSX Transportation, which continues to use the original NC&StL route between Nashville, Chattanooga, and Atlanta. Other portions of the system, such as the route to Hickman, have been abandoned.

== Mileage and revenues ==
At the end of 1925 NC&StL operated 1,259 miles of road on 1,859 miles of track; at the end of 1956, mileages were 1,043 and 1,791.

Revenue freight traffic, in millions of ton-miles
Year	Traffic
1925	1306
1933	851
1944	2766
1956	2073

Revenue passenger traffic, in millions of passenger-miles
Year	Traffic
1925	141
1933	41
1944	376
1956	52

== Passenger trains ==
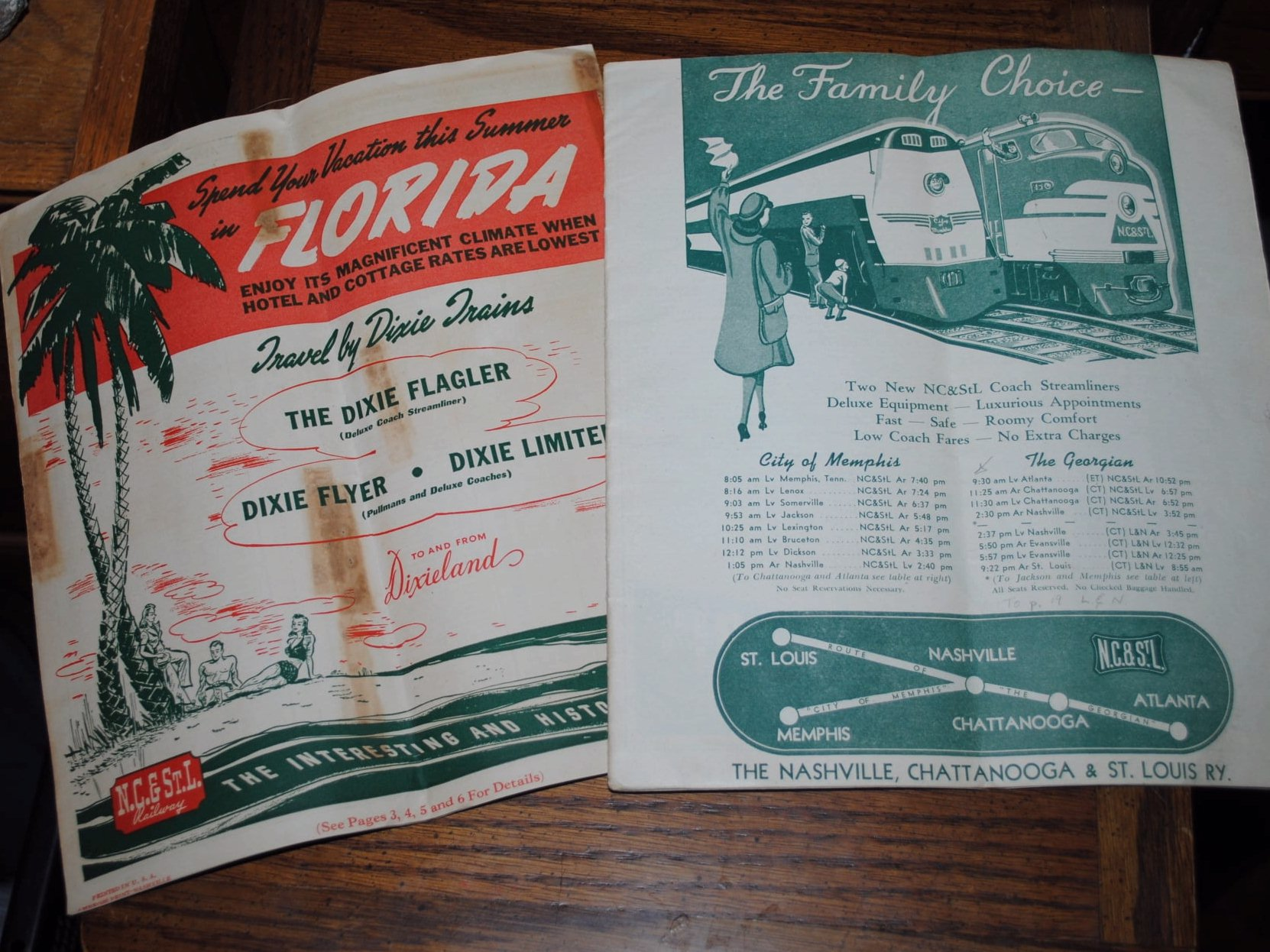
Rear Cover of 1947 and 1942 Passenger Timetables for the Nashville Chattanooga and St Louis Railway

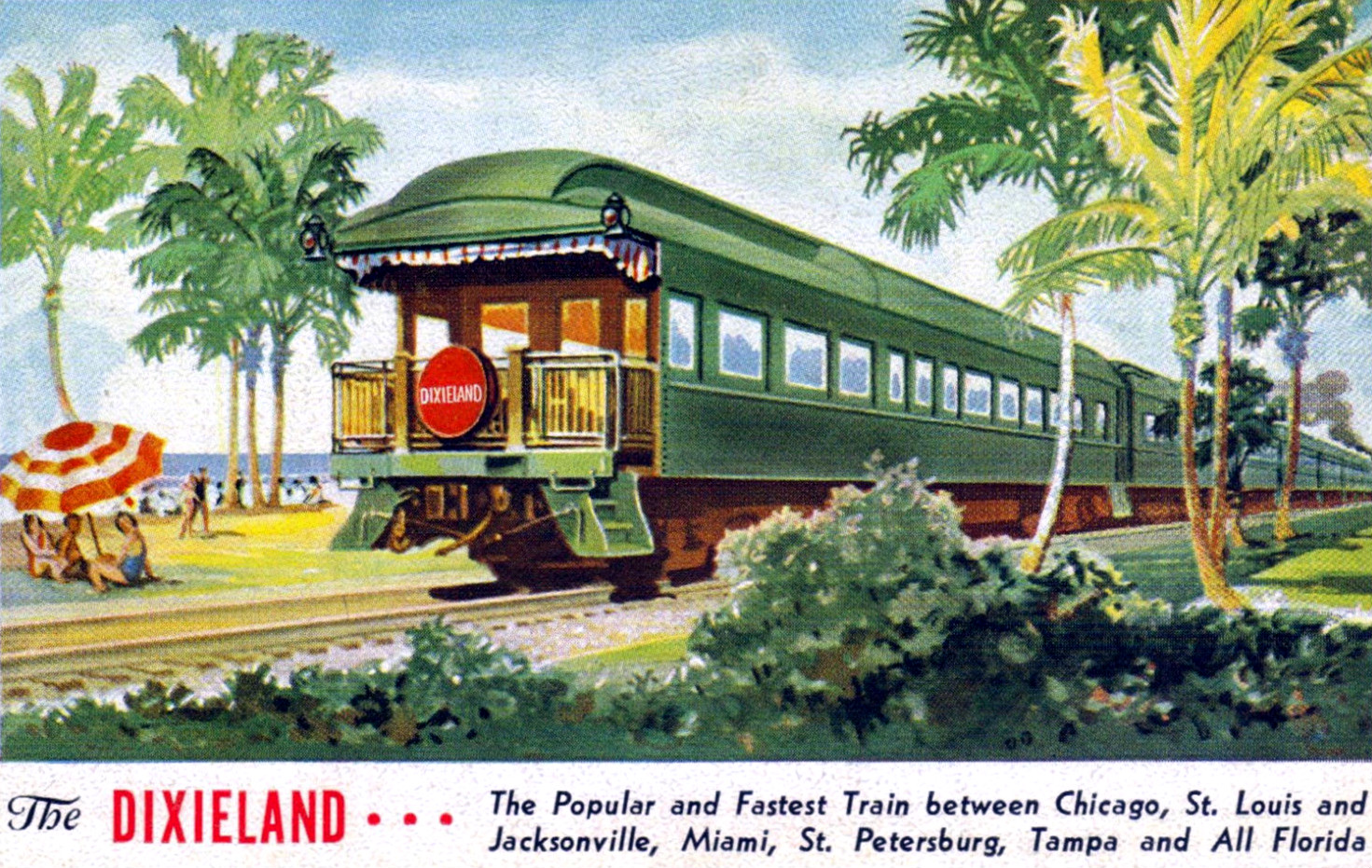
Postcard promoting the Dixieland

The railroad's named passenger trains included:

- City of Memphis (Memphis - Nashville)
- Dixie Express (once the coach section of the all-Pullman Dixie Flyer and at another time the interim name of the Dixie Limited) (Chicago - New Orleans)
- Dixie Flyer (Chicago and St. Louis - Florida)
- Dixie Limited (formerly the Dixie Express, formerly the Chicago and Florida Limited) (Chicago and St. Louis - Florida)
- Dixieland (winter season only until the early 1950s) (Chicago and St. Louis - Florida)
- Dixiana (Chicago and St. Louis - Florida)
- Dixie Flagler (ran every third day; later renamed the Dixieland) (Chicago and St. Louis - Florida)
- Dixie Mail aka Dixie Flyer - Mail and Express (Chicago and St. Louis - Florida)
- Lookout (Memphis - Jackson, TN - Nashville - Chattanooga)

The railroad came to be advertised as the "Dixie Line", beginning in the 1920s. The railroad also operated the Quickstep (name dropped before 1910, then known as Nos. 3 and 4), Georgian, City of Memphis, Volunteer, an unnamed night train (formerly the Memphis Limited), a Nashville-Hickman local, plus a through sleeping car from the Tennessean on Nos. 3 and 4, a Chicago-to-Augusta, Georgia, train. Another part of the train split at Chattanooga and continued as a Southern Railway operation through eastern Tennessee, and onward to Washington and the Northeast Corridor.

The railroad also operated unnamed trains between Nashville and Atlanta via Chattanooga, between Memphis and Paducah, Kentucky, between Dickson and Hohenwald, between Nashville and Hickman, Kentucky, via Union City, between Decherd and Huntsville, Alabama, and other short routes.

== Surviving equipment ==
Two 4-4-0 locomotives from the NC&StL's predecessor road, the Western and Atlantic are on display in museums: The General and The Texas are in the Atlanta suburbs of Kennesaw and Buckhead.

In 1953, the NC&StL donated its last steam engine, No. 576, to the city of Nashville. Originally known as a Yellow Jacket, the J3-57-class 4-8-4 locomotive was manufactured by the American Locomotive Company ("Alco") in 1942. The NC&StL referred to their 4-8-4s as Dixies, while most other railroads called them Northerns. It has been on display in Centennial Park since then. In 2016, the city of Nashville allowed the Nashville Steam Preservation Society to take out a 23-year renewable lease on the locomotive. The locomotive is currently at the Tennessee Central Railway Museum under restoration to working order and use for weekend excursion runs from downtown Nashville east to Watertown.

Two other NC&StL steamers survive, 0-4-0Ts nos. 701 and 704, that used to work in the shops. They were stored in Taylorsville and in 2026 were sold with 701 going to the Northeast Narrow Gauge Railroad Museum in Ralston, Pennsylvania and 704 going into private ownership in North Carolina.

In 2004, a former NC&StL EMD GP7 diesel locomotive, No. 710, was restored to its original paint scheme by the Tennessee Valley Railroad Museum. The TVRM also has the tail car from the city of Memphis on display at its Grand Junction Yard in Chattanooga and an EMD F7A No. 814 in storage.

In 2007, Huntsville terminal switcher No. 100, a former NC&StL GE 44-ton Diesel (1950) was moved from Mt. Pleasant to the Cowan Railroad Museum in Cowan. Though subsequently an L&N engine (number 3100), she was cosmetically restored to original scheme and number. In the process, the locomotive was found to be runnable. It is important as the first transistorized remote-control locomotive in the U.S. (converted in 1962).

== See also ==
- Great Train Wreck of 1918, occurred on the NC&StL line at "Dutchman's Curve" in Nashville
- Rogers Locomotive and Machine Works
- List of Louisville and Nashville Railroad precursors Nashville, Chattanooga and St. Louis Railway section
