= Fordyce Commercial Historic District =

Historic district in Arkansas, United States

- U.S. National Register of Historic Places
- U.S. Historic district
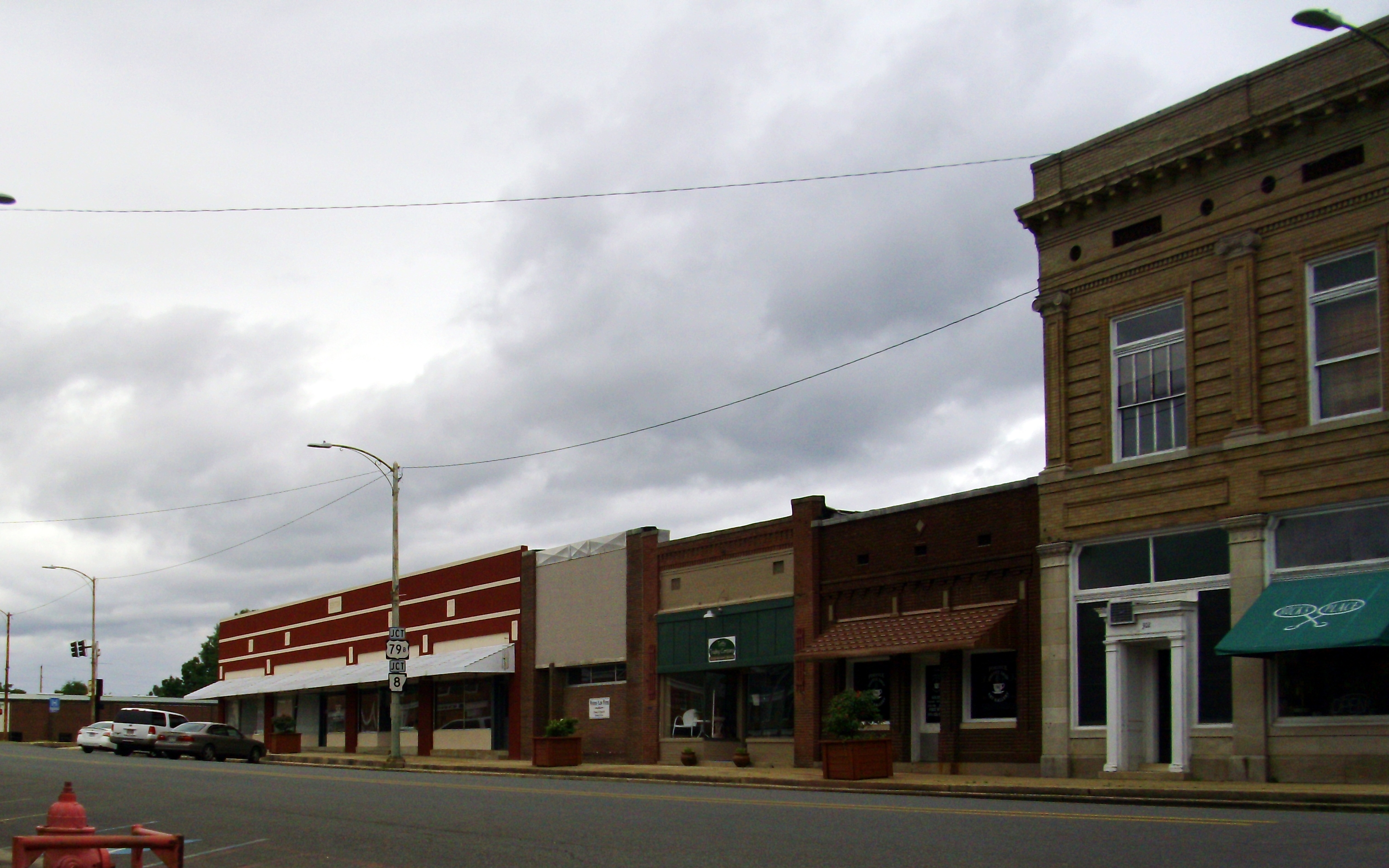

- Location within Arkansas Location within the United States
- Location: Roughly bounded by Oak, 5th & Spring Sts. & AR 274, Fordyce, Arkansas
- Area: 9 acres (3.6 ha)
- Built: 1884
- Architect: Charles L. Thompson, others
- Architectural style: Early Commercial, Late Victorian
- NRHP reference No.: 08000436
- Added to NRHP: May 20, 2008

The Fordyce Commercial Historic District encompasses the historic heart of Fordyce, Arkansas, the county seat of Dallas County. It encompasses four city blocks of North Main Street, between 1st and 4th, and includes properties on these adjacent streets. Fordyce was founded in 1882, and the oldest building in the district, the Nutt-Trussell Building at 202 North Main Street, was built c. 1884. Spurred by the logging industry and the Cotton Belt Railroad, Fordyce's downtown area had 25 buildings by 1901, and continued to grow over the next few decades, resulting in a concentration of period commercial architecture in its downtown. The district was listed on the National Register of Historic Places in 2008.

Interesting buildings in the district include the Fordyce Home Accident Insurance Company building at 300-302 North Main, designed by Charles L. Thompson and built in 1908, and Bob's Barber Shop, a relatively unaltered c. 1900 building on the 100 block of North Main. Properties in the district which were listed separately on the National Register include the c. 1925 railroad depot, a c. 1928 gas station, and a 1922 steam locomotive.

== See also ==
- National Register of Historic Places listings in Dallas County, Arkansas
