= Lick Skillet Railroad Work Station Historic District =

Historic district in Arkansas, United States

Brinkley
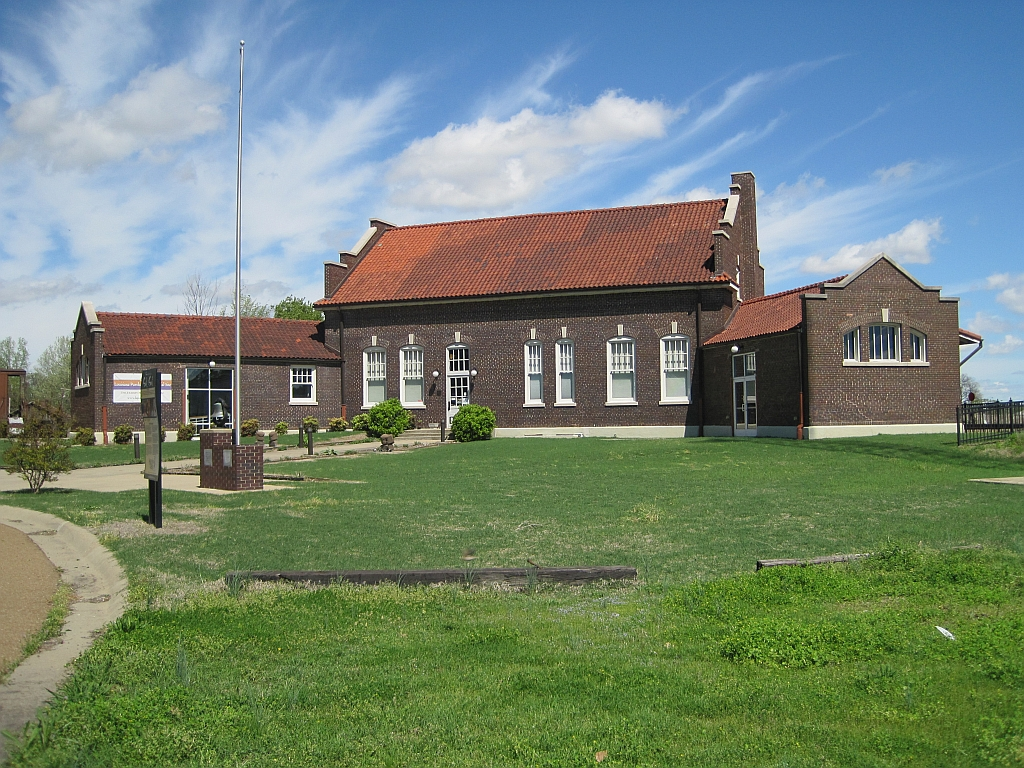
- Former Union Station, today the Central Delta Depot Museum

General information
- Location: 100 West Cypress Street, Brinkley, Arkansas 72021
- System: Former Rock Island Line passenger station
- Platforms: 1

History
- Rebuilt: 1912

Services
Preceding station	Chicago, Rock Island and Pacific Railroad	Following station
Eden toward Tucumcari	Tucumcari – Memphis	Wheatley toward Memphis
Preceding station	St. Louis Southwestern Railway	Following station
Stuttgart toward Gatesville	Main Line	Hunter toward St. Louis
Terminus	Brinkley – Memphis	Rich toward Memphis
- Lick Skillet Railroad Work Station Historic District
- U.S. National Register of Historic Places
- U.S. Historic district
- Location within Arkansas Location within the United States
- Location: Jct. of E. Cypress St. and New Orleans Ave., Brinkley, Arkansas
- Coordinates: 34°53′16″N 91°11′30″W
- Built: 1912
- Architect: Chicago, Rock Island & Pacific RR
- Architectural style: Late 19th And 20th Century Revivals, Mission/Spanish Revival, Mediterranean Revival
- NRHP reference No.: 92000558
- Added to NRHP: June 1, 1992
Location

The Lick Skillet Railroad Work Station Historic District is a historic district in Brinkley, Arkansas that was listed on the National Register of Historic Places in 1992.

It includes the former Brinkley Union Station located at the site of the former crossing of the Rock Island and Cotton Belt railroads in Brinkley, Monroe County in eastern Arkansas. In addition to the Rock Island and Cotton Belt, the station also served branchline trains of the Missouri Pacific.

It also includes Rusher Hotel, also known as Great Southern Hotel.

== History ==
Brinkley's Union Station was constructed in 1912 as a joint station to be utilized by all railroads passing through Brinkley. Cotton Belt passenger train service through Brinkley ended in 1959 and the last Rock Island passenger train stopped at Brinkley on November 10, 1967. Rock Island trackage west from Brinkley to near Little Rock was abandoned and dismantled in the mid-1980s.

Named passenger trains which stopped at Brinkley Union Station include:

- Choctaw Rocket
- Lone Star
- Morning Star

The station and nearby railroad hotel are listed on the National Register of Historic Places as Lick Skillet Railroad Work Station Historic District and Rusher Hotel.

== Central Delta Depot Museum ==
After sitting abandoned for a number of years, Brinkley Union Station has now been restored and is operated as the Central Delta Depot Museum, a local history museum run by the Central Delta Historical Society. Exhibits focus on the natural, social, agricultural, and cultural history of the Arkansas Delta region. Displays include railroad artifacts, mussel diving, jazz musician Louis Jordan, military artifacts, wildlife displays, household artifacts and local history. The grounds include a train depot originally located in Monroe, Arkansas; a sharecropper’s house; and a Southern Pacific Railroad caboose.
