= Bald Knob station =

- Missouri--Pacific Depot
- U.S. National Register of Historic Places
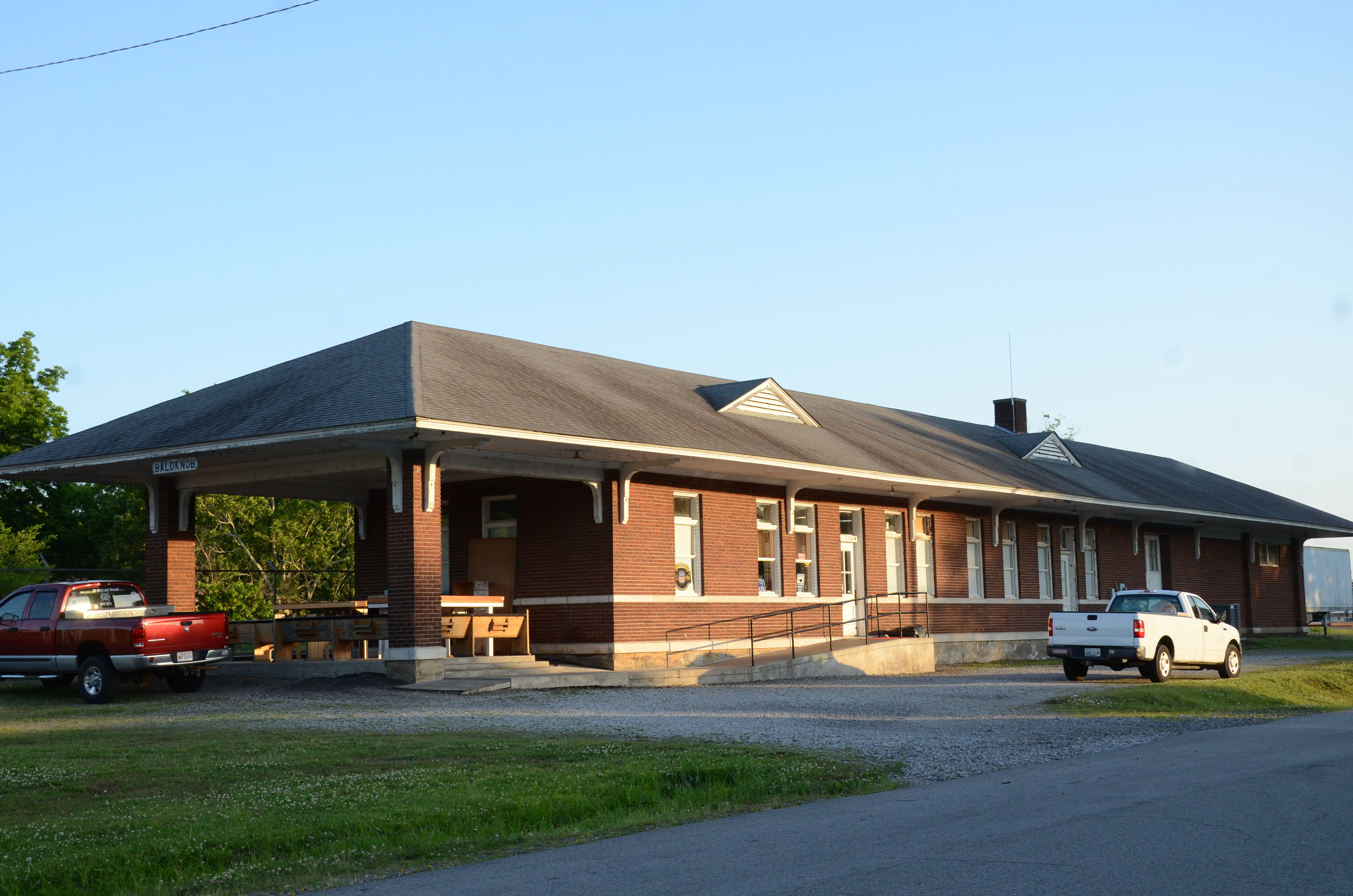

- Location within Arkansas Location within the United States
- Location: Jct. of Market and Ramey Sts., Bald Knob, Arkansas
- Coordinates: 35°18′28″N 91°34′9″W
- Area: less than one acre
- Built: 1915
- Built by: Missouri-Pacific Railroad
- Architectural style: Late 19th And 20th Century Revivals, Mediterranean Colonial Reviv
- MPS: White County MPS
- NRHP reference No.: 91001276
- Added to NRHP: July 20, 1992

The Missouri Pacific Depot is a historic railroad station at Market and Ramey Streets in Bald Knob, Arkansas. It is a rectangular single-story structure, framed in wood and finished in brick, with a broad shallow-pitch hip roof. The northern side of the roof, where passengers waited, is supported by brick posts and has large L-shaped brackets. Built in 1915, it is Bald Knob's second railroad station, a reminder of the role the railroad played in the city's development.

The building was listed on the National Register of Historic Places in 1992.

== See also ==
- Missouri Pacific Railway Caboose No. 928
- National Register of Historic Places listings in White County, Arkansas

Preceding station	Missouri Pacific Railroad	Following station
Judsonia toward Texarkana	Texarkana – St. Louis	Russell toward St. Louis
Terminus	Bald Knob – Memphis	Worden toward Memphis
