= City of Memphis (train) =

Passenger train

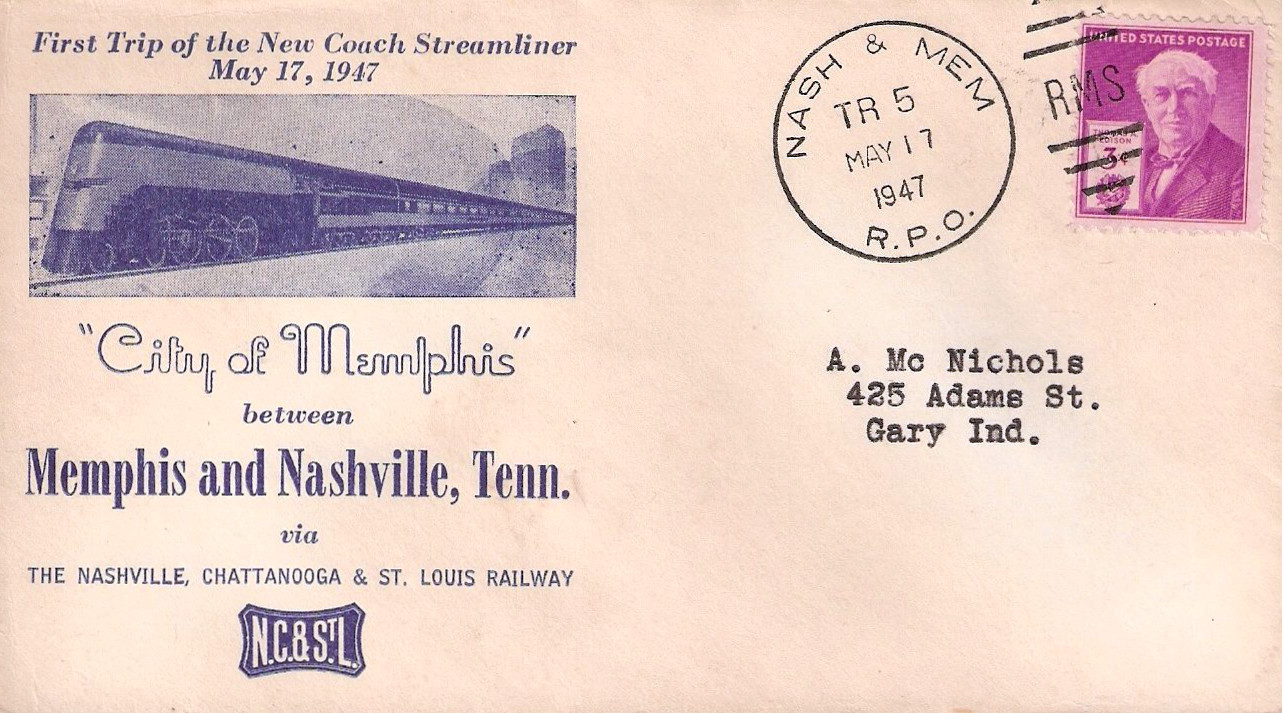
- First trip of the streamlined City of Memphis, May 17, 1947

Overview
- Service type: Inter-city rail
- Status: Discontinued
- Locale: Tennessee
- First service: 1947
- Last service: 1958
- Former operator(s): Nashville, Chattanooga and St. Louis Railway

Route
- Termini: Memphis, Tennessee; Nashville, Tennessee
- Distance travelled: 236.8 miles (381.1 km)
- Average journey time: 5 hrs 00 min
- Service frequency: Daily
- Train number(s): Eastbound: 105-5, Westbound: 106-6

On-board services
- Seating arrangements: Reclining Seat Coaches
- Catering facilities: Tavern-dining car

Technical
- Track gauge: 1,435 mm (4 ft 8 1/2 in)

The City of Memphis was a 236.8-mile (381.1 km) passenger train route operated by the Nashville, Chattanooga and St. Louis Railway connecting Nashville's Nashville Union Station and Memphis, Tennessee's Memphis Union Station.

== History ==
The City of Memphis was powered by one of the last steam locomotives ever streamlined. The six cars were all rebuilt and streamlined by the NC&StL shops from heavyweight cars. The six cars were originally Pullman Heavyweight Parlor Cars before purchase by the NC&STL for conversion to coaches in June 1941.

The six car consist had a revenue seating capacity of 204 and was built to operate on a fast five-hour schedule between Nashville and Memphis a distance of 239 miles (385 km). The train set operated a daily round trip and lasted beyond the 1957 Louisville and Nashville Railroad takeover of the NC&StL, although the name was removed from the service by 1955.

== Equipment ==
Sample consist
- Class K2 4-6-2 Pacific No. 535; Baggage-mail No. 1040; Coach-dinette-lounge No. 1100; Coach No. 1101 (56 seats); Coach No. 1102 (56 seats); Dining-tavern No. 1200; Coach-lounge-observation No. 1103

To equip the train the railroad rebuilt six heavyweight Pullman parlor cars. The resulting train consisted of a baggage-mail car, a coach-dinette-lounge, two 56-seat coaches, a dining-tavern car, and a coach-lounge-observation car. Several of the train's cars survive, including the coach-lounge-observation, which is part of the collection of the Tennessee Valley Railroad Museum in the Chattanooga area.
