= Nutt–Trussell Building =

- U.S. National Register of Historic Places
- U.S. Historic district – Contributing property
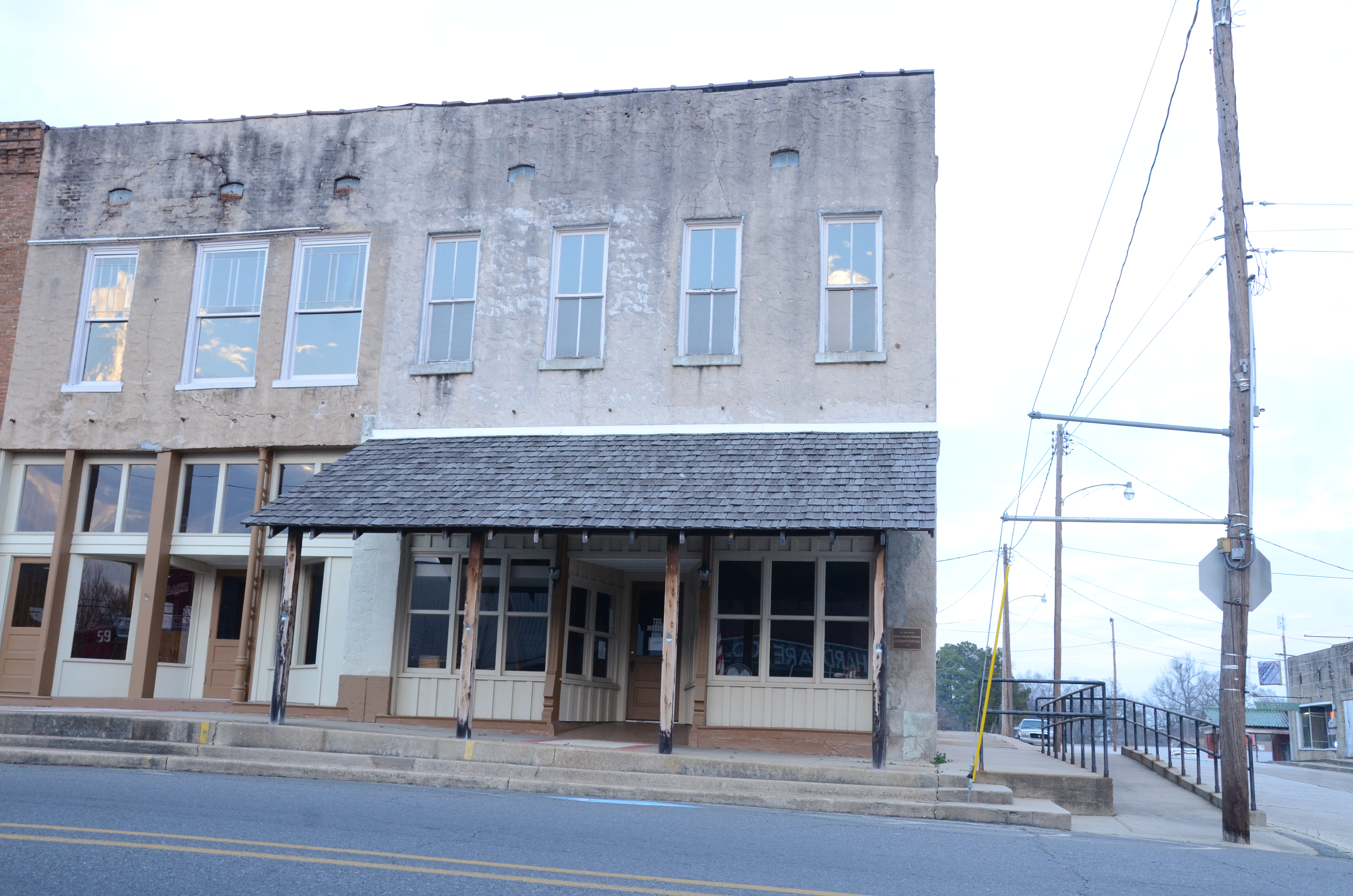

- Location within Arkansas Location within the United States
- Location: 202 N. Main St., Fordyce, Arkansas
- Coordinates: 33°48′44″N 92°24′41″W
- Area: less than one acre
- Built: 1883
- Part of: Fordyce Commercial Historic District (ID92000608)
- NRHP reference No.: 01000110

Significant dates
- Added to NRHP: March 4, 2001
- Designated CP: June 11, 1992

The Nutt–Trussell Building is a historic commercial building at 202 North Main Street in downtown Fordyce, Arkansas, USA. Built in 1883, this two-story structure was the first brick building erected in Fordyce, a railroad town in southwestern Arkansas. Its exterior was covered in stucco c. 1920. It was built by Robert Nutt, who operated a dry goods shop on the premises. It later housed the Bank of Fordyce, and its upper floor has a long history of use for social club meetings (notably local Masons), and also housed the city's first telephone exchange. The descendants of L. L. Trussell, a later owner, gave the building to the city in 2000 for use as a local history museum.

The building was listed on the National Register of Historic Places in 1992.

== See also ==
- National Register of Historic Places listings in Dallas County, Arkansas
