= Marathon Oil Service Station =

- U.S. National Register of Historic Places
- U.S. Historic district – Contributing property
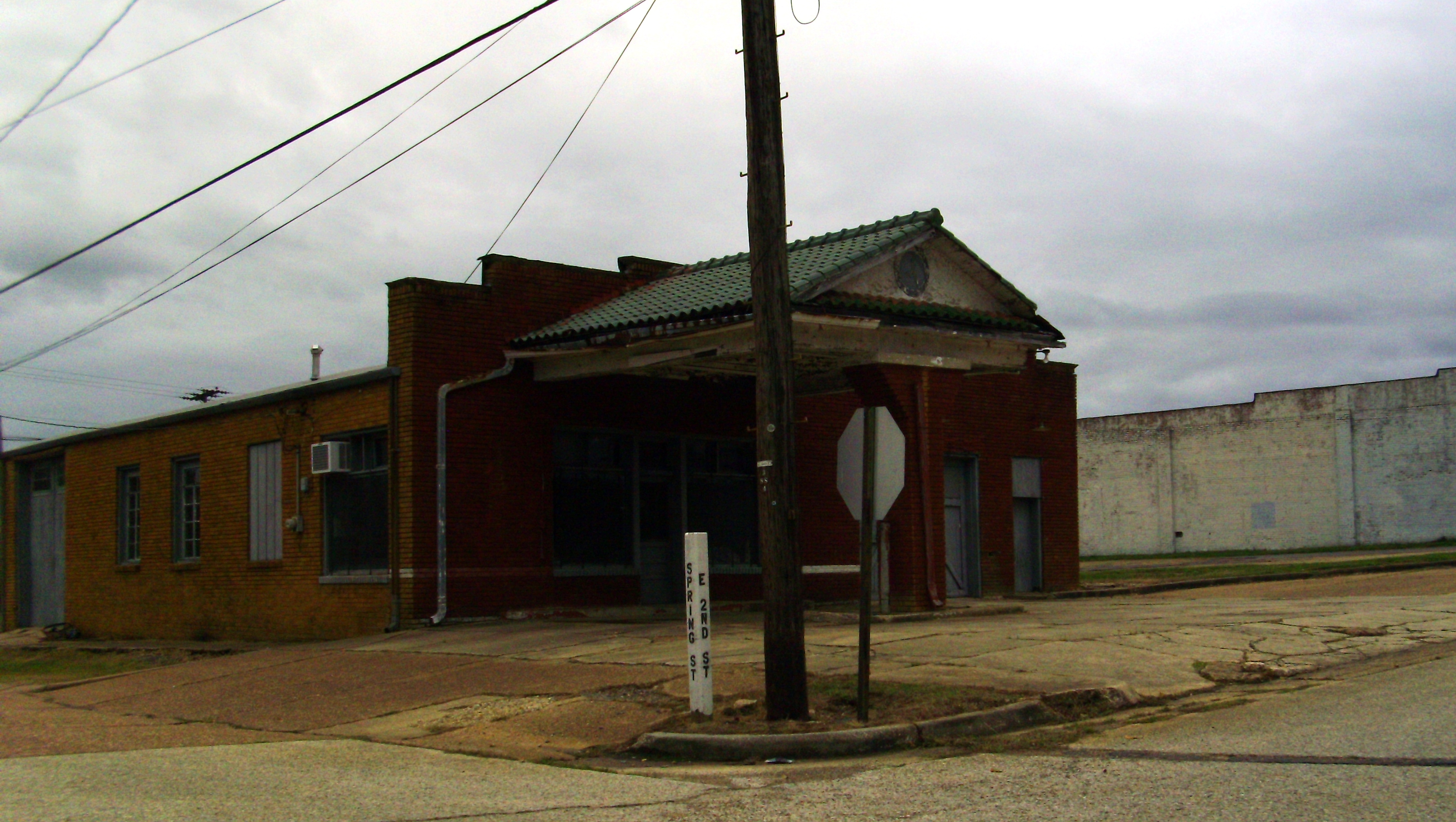

- Location within Arkansas Location within the United States
- Location: E. Second and Spring St., Fordyce, Arkansas
- Coordinates: 33°48′43″N 92°24′43″W
- Area: 1 acre (0.40 ha)
- Built: 1928
- Architectural style: Late 19th And 20th Century Revivals, plain-traditional
- Part of: Fordyce Commercial Historic District (ID92000608)
- MPS: Arkansas Highway History and Architecture MPS
- NRHP reference No.: 01000484

Significant dates
- Added to NRHP: May 10, 2001
- Designated CP: June 11, 1992

The Marathon Oil Service Station is a historic automotive service facility at the southeast corner of East 2nd and Spring Streets in downtown Fordyce, Arkansas. It is a single story building constructed out of red and buff brick, with an auto canopy covered in a tile roof. The main facade of the building has a parapet which conceals a barrel roof. The building is divided into two functional bays, an office to the left and a garage bay to the right. The canopy extends in front of the left bay, and is supported by a single brick column, in which there is an original Marathon Oil logo. The building is a well-preserved example of a 1920s service station.

The station was listed on the National Register of Historic Places in 1992.

== See also ==
- National Register of Historic Places listings in Dallas County, Arkansas
