= Missouri Pacific Railway Caboose No. 928 =

- U.S. National Register of Historic Places
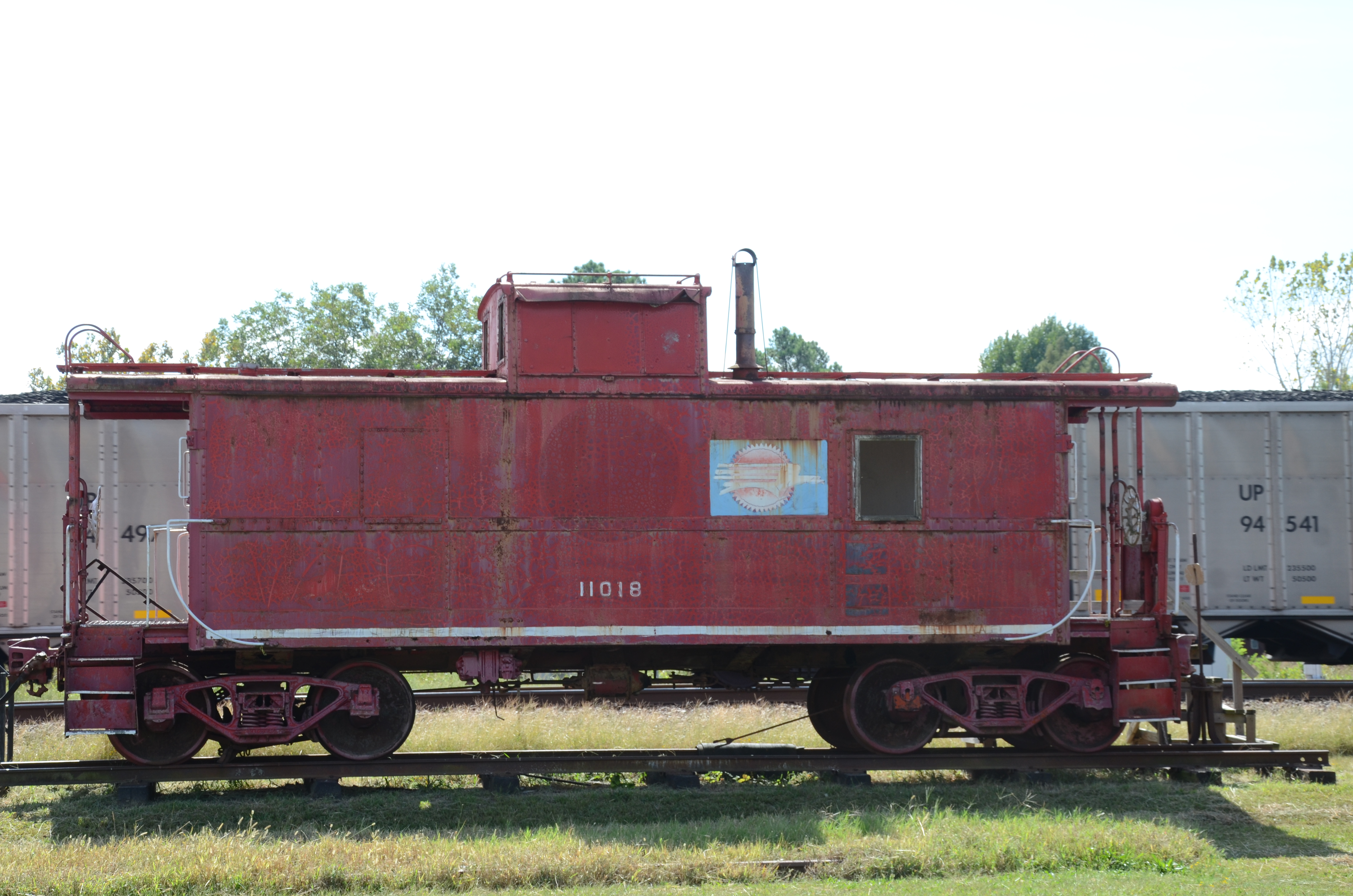

- Location within Arkansas Location within the United States
- Location: Next to UPRR on Market St., southwest of Vine St., Bald Knob, Arkansas
- Coordinates: 35°18′28″N 91°34′9″W
- Built: 1937
- Built by: Magor Car Corporation
- NRHP reference No.: 11000303
- Added to NRHP: May 16, 2011

The Missouri Pacific Railway Caboose No. 928 is a historic caboose, located near Market and Vine Streets in Bald Knob, Arkansas, near the former Missouri Pacific Depot. It is a cupola caboose, measuring 34 feet 2 inches (10.41 m) in length and 10 feet 0.5 inches (3.061 m) in width, with a height of 14 feet 8.125 inches (4.47358 m). It was built in 1937 by the Magor Car Corporation, and was used by the Missouri Pacific Railroad until it was retired in 1986. It was one of the first generation of steel-framed cupola cabooses built, a form that later became commonplace. It was then given to the city of Searcy, where it was displayed until 2009. It was transferred to the White County Historical Society, and was then moved to Bald Knob.

The caboose was listed on the National Register of Historic Places in 2011.

== See also ==
- Missouri Pacific Depot (Bald Knob, Arkansas)
- National Register of Historic Places listings in White County, Arkansas
