= Tennessee, Alabama and Georgia 101 =

American 2-8-0 locomotive

Tennessee, Alabama & Georgia 101 Fordyce & Princeton 101
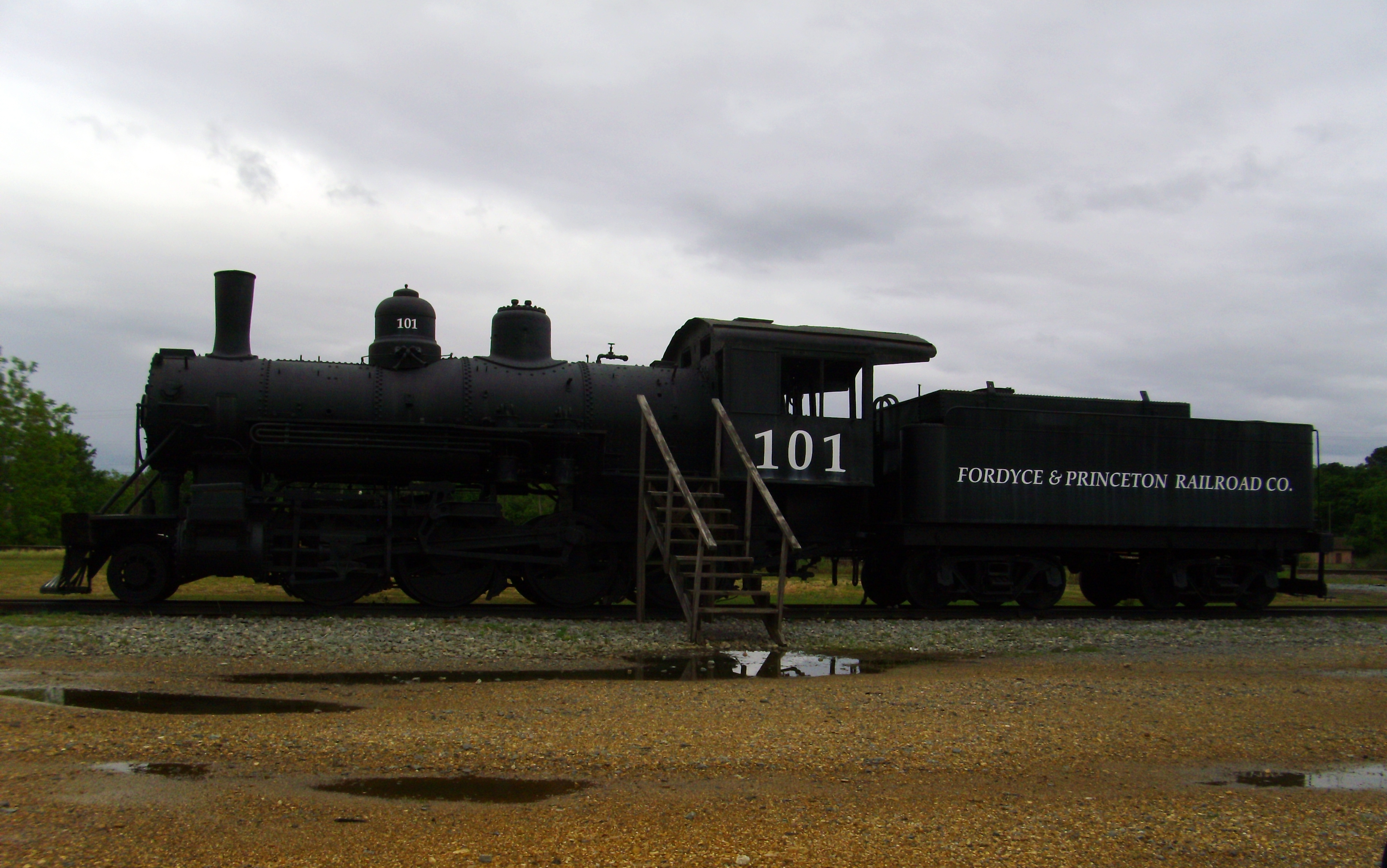
Type and origin
- Power type: Steam
- Builder: Baldwin Locomotive Works
- Serial number: 55644
- Build date: 1922
Specifications
- Configuration
  - Whyte: 2-8-0
  - UIC: 1′D
- Driver dia.: 50 in (1.270 m)
- Fuel type: Coal
- Boiler pressure: 170 psi (1.17 MPa)
- Cylinders: Two, outside
- Cylinder size: 20 in × 24 in (508 mm × 610 mm)
- Valve gear: Walschaerts
- Valve type: Piston valves
- Loco brake: Air
- Train brakes: Air
- Couplers: Knuckle
Performance figures
- Tractive effort: 27,744 lbf (123.41 kN)
Career
- Operators: Tennessee, Alabama and Georgia Railway; Fordyce and Princeton Railroad
- Numbers: 101
- Retired: TAG: 1931; F&P: 1948
- Tennessee, Alabama & Georgia Railway Steam Locomotive #101
- U.S. National Register of Historic Places
- U.S. Historic district – Contributing property
- Location within Arkansas Location within the United States
- Location: NW. of Jct. of N. Main St. & Union Pacific RR., Fordyce, Arkansas
- Coordinates: 33°48′46″N 92°24′42″W
- Area: less than one acre
- Built: 1922
- Part of: Fordyce Commercial Historic District (ID92000608)
- NRHP reference No.: 07001425

Significant dates
- Added to NRHP: January 24, 2008
- Designated CP: June 11, 1992

The Tennessee, Alabama and Georgia 101 is a historic steam locomotive located near the Cotten Belt Railroad Depot in downtown Fordyce, Arkansas. It is the last known steam locomotive associated with the Fordyce and Princeton Railroad. It was built in 1922 by the Baldwin Locomotive Works of Philadelphia, Pennsylvania, for the Tennessee, Alabama and Georgia Railway. It was sold to the Fordyce and Princeton in 1931, and retired in 1948. Given to the city of Little Rock, it was displayed at the Little Rock Zoo for twenty years, and was moved to Fordyce in 2007.

== See also ==
- National Register of Historic Places listings in Dallas County, Arkansas
