= Nashville, Chattanooga and St. Louis 576 =

Preserved NC&StL J3-57 class 4-8-4 locomotive

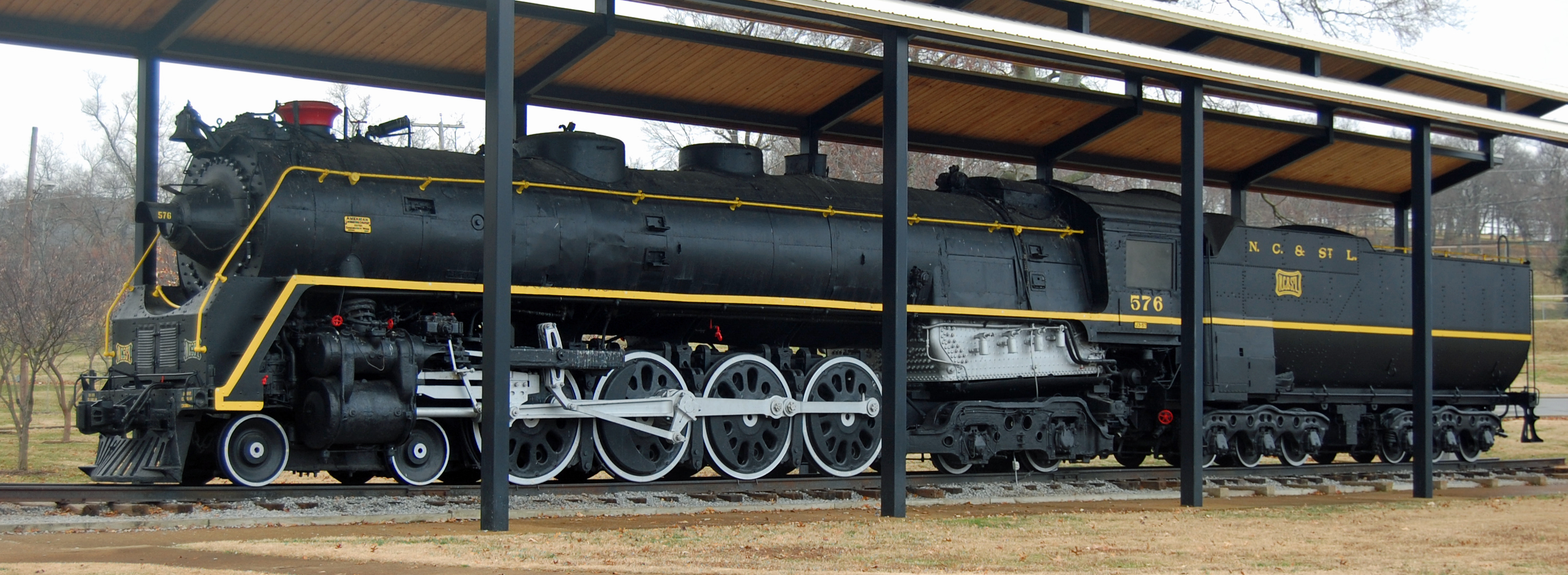
- NC&StL No. 576 on static display at the Centennial Park in December 2008
Type and origin
- Power type: Steam
- Designer: Clarence M. Darden
- Builder: American Locomotive Company (Schenectady Works)
- Serial number: 69786
- Build date: August 1942
Specifications
- Configuration
  - Whyte: 4-8-4
- Gauge: 4 ft 8 1/2 in (1,435 mm) standard gauge
- Driver dia.: 70 in (1,778 mm)
- Minimum curve: 19°
- Wheelbase: Overall: 86 ft 6 in (26,365 mm)
- Height: 15 ft 5 in (4.70 m)
- Axle load: 66,622.5 lb (30,219.5 kilograms; 30.2195 metric tons)
- Adhesive weight: 228,000 lb (103,000 kg)
- Loco weight: 400,500 lb (181,700 kg)
- Tender weight: 285,000 lb (129,000 kg)
- Total weight: 685,500 lb (310,900 kg)
- Fuel type: Coal
- Fuel capacity: 36,000 lb (16 tonnes)
- Water cap.: 15,000 US gal (57,000 L; 12,000 imp gal)
- Fuel consumption: 4 t (3.9 long tons; 4.4 short tons) of coal per hour 7,000 US gallons (26,000 L) of water per hour
- Firebox
  - Grate area: 77.30 sq ft (7.2 m^{2})
- Boiler pressure: 250 psi (1.72 MPa)
- Feedwater heater: Worthington Type SA; 9,000 US gal/hr cap
- Superheater: Elesco Type E
- Cylinders: Two, outside
- Cylinder size: 25 in × 30 in (635 mm × 762 mm)
- Valve gear: Walschaerts
- Valve type: Piston valves
- Loco brake: Air
- Train brakes: Air
- Couplers: Knuckle
Performance figures
- Maximum speed: 90–110 mph (145–177 km/h)
- Power output: Estimated 4,000 hp (3,000 kW)
- Tractive effort: 57,000 lbf (253.5 kN)
- Factor of adh.: 4.01
Career
- Operators: Nashville, Chattanooga and St. Louis Railway (NC&StL); Nashville Steam Preservation Society (leased)
- Class: J3-57
- Number in class: 7 of 20
- Numbers: NC&StL 576
- Nicknames: Yellow Jacket; The Stripe
- Locale: Middle Tennessee
- First run: August 18, 1942
- Retired: September 2, 1952
- Preserved: September 20, 1953
- Current owner: Nashville Board of Parks and Recreation; Nashville Steam Preservation Society (leased operator)
- Disposition: Undergoing restoration to operating condition

Nashville, Chattanooga and St. Louis 576 is a 4-8-4 "Dixie" (Northern) type steam locomotive, built in August 1942 by the American Locomotive Company (ALCO) of Schenectady, New York, for the Nashville, Chattanooga and St. Louis Railway (NC&StL). The locomotive is part of the technologically advanced J3 class.

During World War II, the J3s hauled heavy freight and troop trains. After the war, they were used in dual freight and passenger service until the early 1950s, when dwindling traffic and the onset of dieselization led to their retirement and scrapping around 1952. No. 576, the only surviving mainline NC&StL steam locomotive, was donated to the city of Nashville, Tennessee, and put on display at the Centennial Park.

In 2019, No. 576 was moved to the Tennessee Central Railway Museum (TCRM), where it is being restored to operating condition by the Nashville Steam Preservation Society (NSPS) for use in excursion service on the shortline Nashville and Eastern Railroad. The restoration work is expected to be complete around 2027.

== History ==
=== Design and appearance ===
During World War II, the Nashville, Chattanooga and St. Louis Railway (NC&StL) found itself unable to order more diesel locomotives to handle the increased passenger traffic. Officials decided to go for steam power; they accepted a proposal by the American Locomotive Company (ALCO) for a streamlined 4-8-4 J3 locomotive similar to the Norfolk and Western (N&W) J class locomotives, (a design rejected by the Louisville and Nashville Railroad (L&N) for being too expensive). The NC&StL's Superintendent of Machinery, Clarence M. Darden, designed ten J3 (Nos. 570-579) locomotives delivered between July and August 1942 from ALCO in a semi-streamlined design with yellow skirting panels, a bullet nose cone, boxpok drivers, and a large semi-Vanderbilt tender holding 16 tonnes (16,000 kg) of coal and 15,000 US gallons (57,000 L) of water. Although other railroads called their 4-8-4s the Northerns, the J3s were nicknamed Dixies. They each consumed 4 short tons (8,000 lb) of coal and 7,000 US gallons (26,000 L) of water per hour. The NC&StL locomotive crews nicknamed the J3s as the Yellow Jackets after their yellow skirting.

In 1943, ALCO built ten more J3s (Nos. 580-589); wartime restrictions prevented applying the yellow skirting, so their running board edges were painted yellow and these locomotives were dubbed Stripes. After the war ended, the skirting was removed from the 1942 J3 locomotives for easier maintenance, and the bullet nose cones were removed on all of the J3s. All of the J3s were originally equipped with a Commonwealth style pilot, which has a retractable coupler that could horizontally swing out. This was eventually replaced by a standard cast-steel pilot with exposed coupler in response to the locomotive crew getting tired of extracting the coupler multiple times. The J3s were all equipped with one-piece cast-steel frames with integral cylinders and Timken roller bearings on all axles.

=== Revenue service and retirement ===
No. 576 was built at a cost of $166,500 and delivered to the NC&StL Railway, which put it into revenue service on August 18, 1942. Along with the other J3s, No. 576 helped move arms, materiel, and troops during the rapid buildup and mobilization of the American war effort during World War II. They initially ran only between Nashville and Chattanooga, Tennessee, because at 100 feet long, they could not fit on the 90-foot turntables in Atlanta, Georgia until 110-foot ones were installed. After the war ended in 1945, the J3s were reassigned to dual freight and passenger service, in which they were capable enough to pull passenger trains such as the Dixie Flagler, the Dixie Flyer, and the Dixie Limited, between Nashville and Atlanta. They also have the chance to run between Nashville and Memphis, Tennessee, via Bruceton and Martin. The J3s even worked in Cowan, Tennessee, banking trains up in the Cumberland Mountains and also do considerable service on work train duties. The J3s ran up to 11,000 miles (18,000 km) per month.

As the NC&StL began to dieselize, the first two J3s, Nos. 570 and 571, were retired and scrapped on December 6, 1951, while No. 576 and the other J3s remained in service until September 2, 1952. After retirement, No. 576 was chosen for preservation and donated to the City of Nashville, where it was put on outdoor display at the Centennial Park on September 20, 1953. The locomotive began to slowly deteriorated from constant exposure to outdoor weather. In November 1969, No. 576 appeared on that month's LIFE magazine front cover with famed American singer and songwriter Johnny Cash.

=== Attempted restoration ===
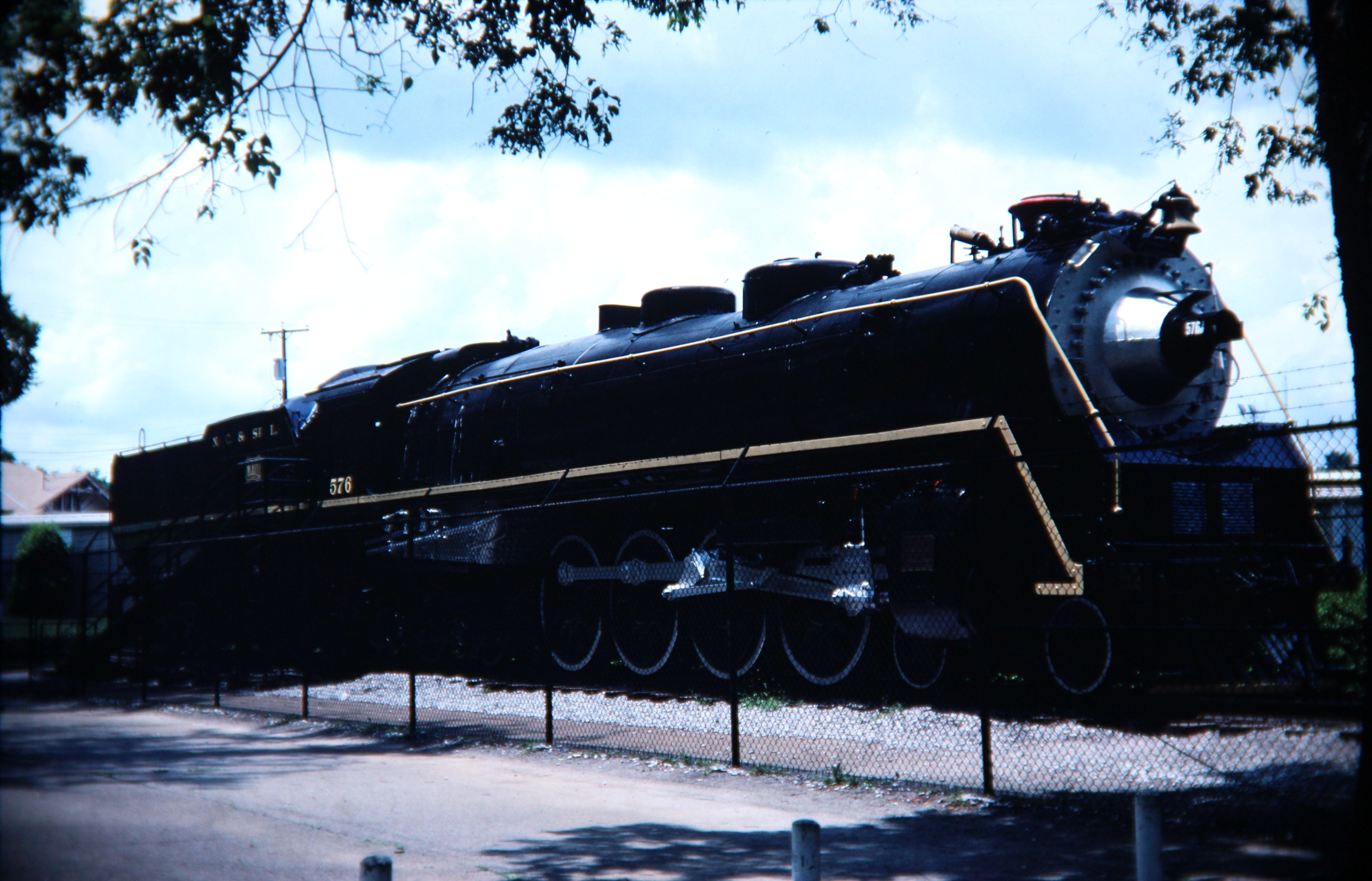
No. 576 on display in 1982, before being sheltered in 2004.

Attempts to restore No. 576 to operating condition were first made in the early 1970s, when it was one of the locomotive candidates for the American Freedom Train project before Reading 2101 was chosen because it had larger 4-8-4 dimensions than the former. The Southern Railway (SOU) representatives even made a deal with the Nashville Board of Parks and Recreation to the acquire the No. 576 locomotive for use in their steam excursion program. But instead of selling the locomotive, the board either increased the asking price or decided to retain it at Centennial Park altogether.

In late 1978, the Clinchfield Railroad (CRR) hosted a steam excursion program, using 4-6-0 No. 1, and they were in search of a larger locomotive to expand the program at the request of the Family Lines. The CRR's general manager, Thomas D. Moore Jr., and L&N executive Colonel Philip Hooper negotiated with the Nashville Board of Parks and Recreation to lease and restore No. 576, but the board decided against their proposal. In late May 1979, the Nashville board members changed their minds, and they re-entered negotiations with the CRR to lease and restore No. 576, but to no avail; by that time, the Family Lines had cancelled the steam program after Thomas Moore was accused of participating in a scandal. SOU's successor, Norfolk Southern (NS) once had plans to lease No. 576 for use in running for their steam program during the 1980s, but shifting priorities led to NS ending the program in late 1994.

In February 2001, the Tennessee Central Railway Museum (TCRM) proposed to obtain ownership of No. 576 and to restore it for excursion service, citing them doing so would end the locomotive's exposure to the weather. The director of the Nashville Board of Parks and Recreation at the time, Jim Fyke, was reluctant to relinquish ownership of the locomotive to the museum without additional knowledge of their plans, and the board quickly denied the proposal. In 2004, a shelter shed was built over the No. 576 locomotive to protect it from the weather.

=== Full restoration ===
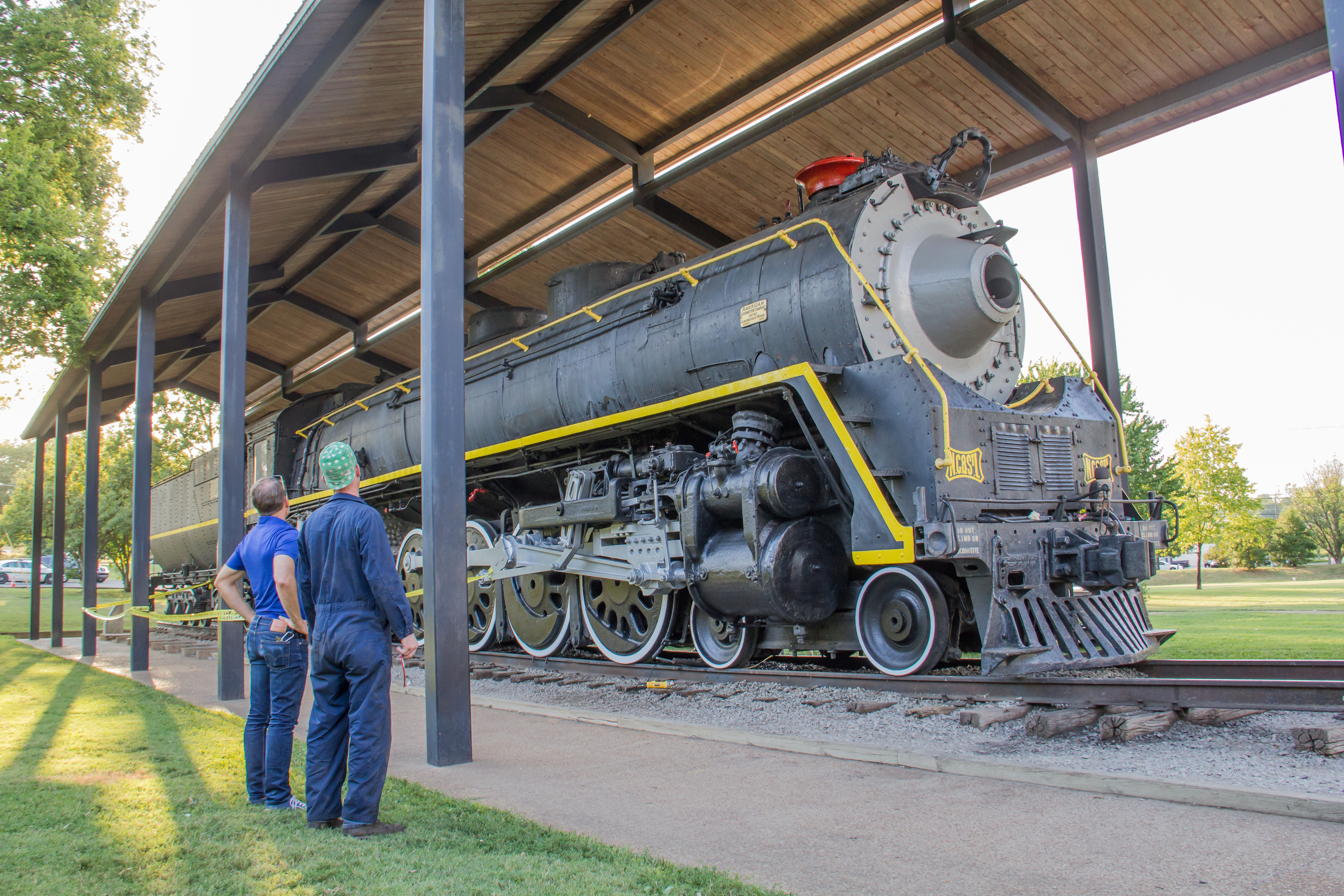
No. 576 repainted at its Centennial Park display site by the Nashville Steam Preservation Society, September 16, 2016.

In April 2016, the newly-formed Nashville Steam Preservation Society (NSPS) made their own proposal to restore No. 576 and run it on the shortline Nashville and Eastern Railroad (NERR), pulling the Tennessee Central Railway Museum's (TCRM) excursions. Two months later, the Nashville Board of Parks and Recreation approved the lease of No. 576 to the NSPS. In April 2017, the NSPS volunteers inspected No. 576's boiler and found it to be in good condition. By October 2018, the NSPS had raised $500,000 to move No. 576 to the TCRM's restoration facility and begin a restoration effort projected to cost a total of $2.5 million.

On January 13, 2019, the No. 576 locomotive was moved from Centennial Park on a flatbed truck. It was placed on the Nashville & Western rails on February 6, where it was prepared to be moved to CSX trackage. The No. 576 locomotive made its final public appearance at the former Nashville Union Station on March 9, 2019, and the next day, moved to the TCRM's workshop where restoration work began. In June 2019, the NSPS received two boxcars from CSX to store restoration equipment and materials. During the work, a new cab was fabricated from scratch to replace the deteriorated original. (Note: No. 576's whistle was temporarily used on the Nickel Plate Road 765 locomotive twice in 2019 and 2022.)

On March 25, 2021, a storm damaged the TCRM restoration facility, but No. 576 was found to be undamaged. The workshop was quickly rebuilt, and the restoration work resumed. On April 15, Trains magazine donated $600,000 to the NSPS to renovate No. 576's driving wheels and trucks. The boiler required hydrostatic testing. On June 17, 2021, No. 576's boiler and frame were removed from its wheels and running gear. The driving wheels were repaired at the Tennessee Valley Railroad Museum (TVRM) in Chattanooga, Tennessee.

On July 12, 2023, the reassembly of No. 576 began. In October 2023, TVRM donated a former NC&STL tender to NSPS, which would be restored and converted to an auxiliary water tender for use behind No. 576. In September 2025, No. 576's boiler successfully passed its FRA-required hydrostatic test, where it was pressurized for the first time in 73 years. The remaining restoration and reassembly work is expected to take an additional six to nine months, placing the locomotive's return to operation around 2027. The total restoration cost is estimated to be $3 million. On July 16, 2026, No. 576 was fired up for the first time in nearly 74 years as it went under a successful stationary steam test.

== See also ==
- Chesapeake and Ohio 614
- Grand Trunk Western 6325
- Norfolk and Western 611
- Reading 2102
- Santa Fe 3751
- Southern Pacific 4449
- Southern Railway 4501
- Spokane, Portland and Seattle 700
- U.S. Sugar 148
- Union Pacific 844

== Bibliography ==
- Drury, George H. (2015). Guide to North American Steam Locomotives (2nd ed.). Kalmbach Media. ISBN 978-1-62700-259-2.
- Prince, Richard E. (2001). Nashville, Chattanooga & St. Louis Railway: History and Steam Locomotives (2nd ed.). Indiana University Press. ISBN 978-0-253-33927-0.
- Schult, Dain L. (2002). Nashville, Chattanooga & St. Louis Railway: A History of "The Dixie Line" (1st ed.). TLC Publishing Inc. ISBN 1-883089-74-3.
