= Rusher Hotel =

- U.S. National Register of Historic Places
- U.S. Historic district – Contributing property
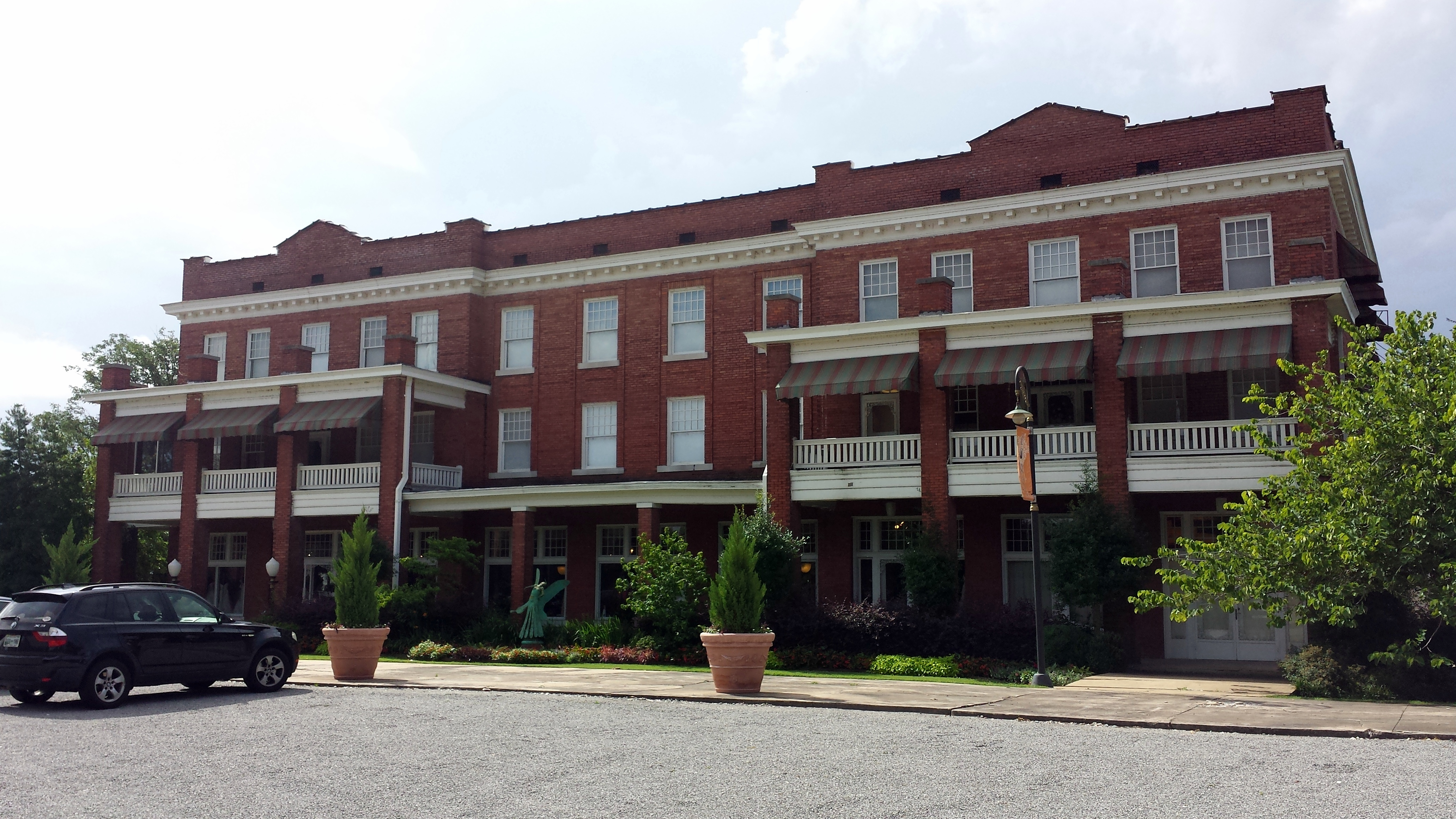

- Location within Arkansas Location within the United States
- Location: 127 W. Cedar, Brinkley, Arkansas
- Coordinates: 34°53′15″N 91°11′32″W
- Built: 1915
- Part of: Lick Skillet Railroad Work Station Historic District (ID92000558)
- NRHP reference No.: 86001664

Significant dates
- Added to NRHP: July 18, 1986
- Designated CP: June 1, 1992

The Rusher Hotel, also known as the Great Southern Hotel, is a historic hotel building at 127 West Cedar Street in Brinkley, Arkansas. It was opened in January 1915 to serve the Brinkley Union Station. It is a three-story brick building, whose main entrance originally faced the railroad, but was reoriented to the street facade after the railroad declined in importance. The building was listed on the National Register of Historic Places in 1986, and is a contributing property to the Lick Skillet Railroad Work Station Historic District.

The hotel has 60 rooms, and it cost $60,000 at the time of its opening. It provided lodging for rail workers, the passengers of the local rail station (about 500 per day), as well as hosting events for local organizations and other gatherings. Traffic to the hotel declined after World War II. Portions of the building were converted in 1960s for other purposes, before new owners restored the hotel in 1981.

== See also ==
- National Register of Historic Places listings in Monroe County, Arkansas
