= Tennessee Central Railway Museum =

Railroad museum

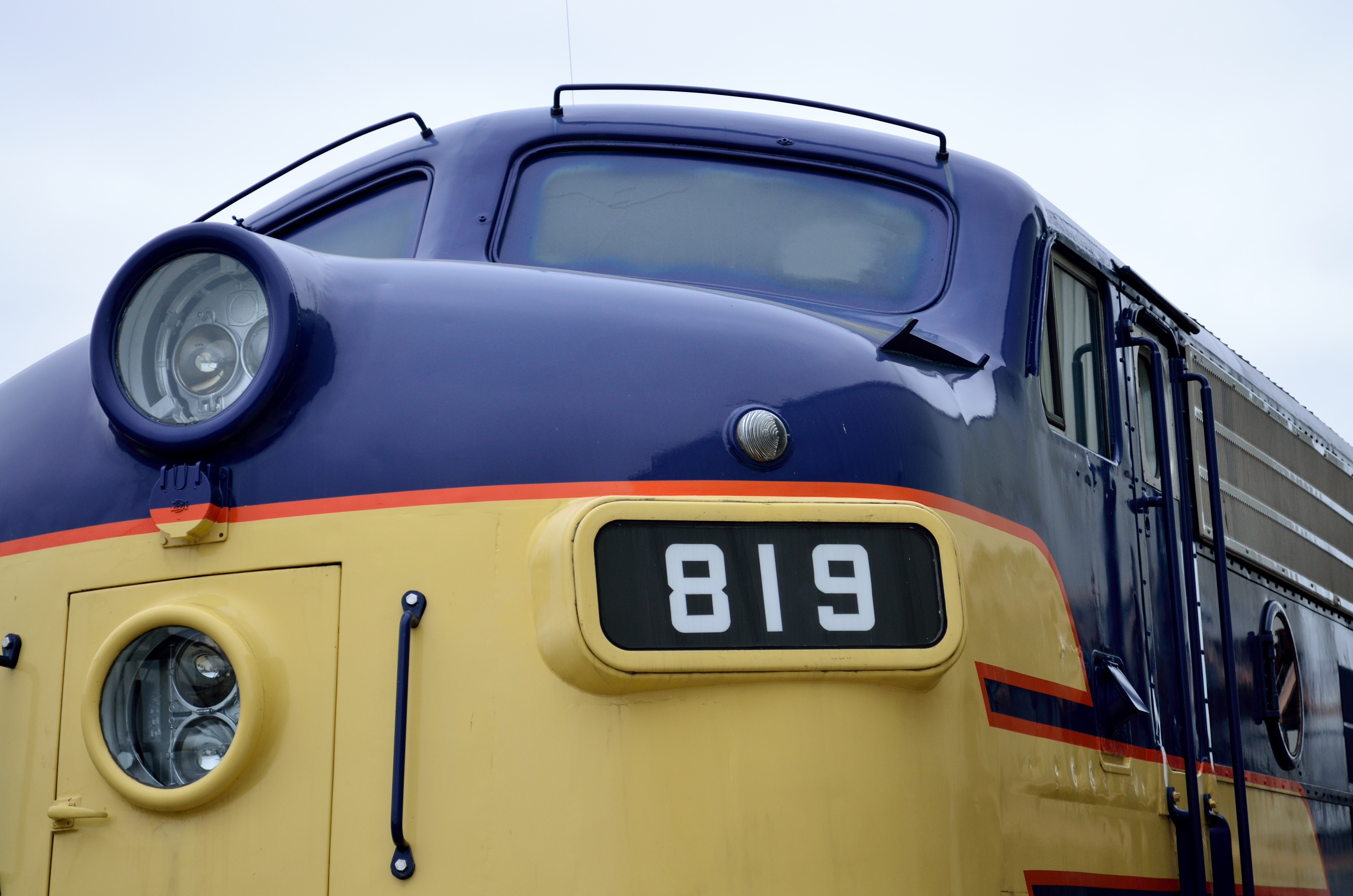
- EMD F7 locomotive
- Established: 1989
- Location: 220 Willow Street; Nashville, Tennessee 37210
- Coordinates: 36°9′17.5″N 86°45′17″W
- Type: Railroad museum, Heritage railway
- Key holdings: NC&StL 576 Locomotive
- Website: www.tcry.org

The Tennessee Central Railway Museum (TCRM, reporting mark TCRX) is a railroad museum located in Nashville, Tennessee.

It is a small non-profit facility which is preserving the heritage of rail transport in Tennessee and the central South. The museum's name honors the former Tennessee Central Railway.

The museum maintains a collection of historic rolling stock which it restores and uses for rail excursions in the area, both for fundraising and educational purposes.

It runs an all-volunteer heritage railroad dedicated to preserving, restoring, interpreting, and operating historic railroad equipment. TCRM currently has nine diesel-electric locomotives and thirty other cars/engines.

Inside the freight depot where the museum is located, there are railroad artifacts and memorabilia, a gift shop, and a large room where model train layouts in HO and N scale are displayed.

== See also ==
- Cookeville Depot Museum
- List of heritage railroads in the United States
- Nashville, Chattanooga and St. Louis 576
