= Tennessean (train) =

American intercity passenger train

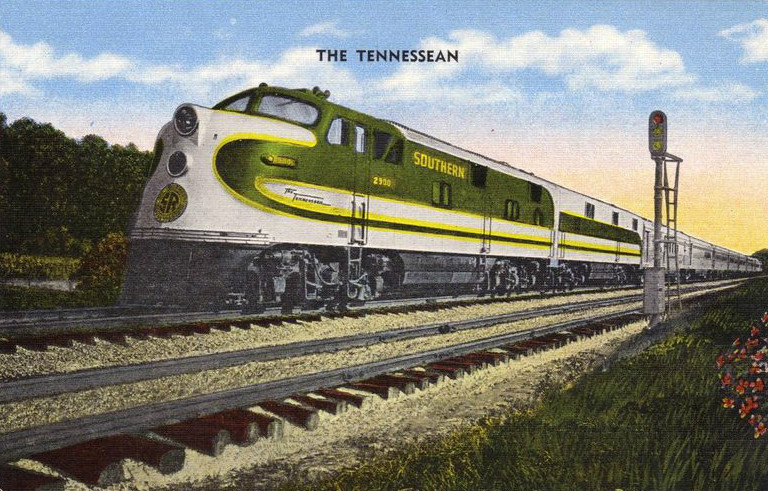

Overview
- Service type: Inter-city rail
- Status: Discontinued
- Locale: Southeastern United States
- First service: May 17, 1941
- Last service: March 30, 1968
- Former operator(s): Southern Railway via Norfolk and Western Railway

Route
- Termini: Washington, DC; Memphis, Tennessee
- Distance travelled: 1,155.1 miles (1,859.0 km)
- Average journey time: 23 hours, 50 minutes
- Service frequency: Daily
- Train number(s): 45 (southbound), 46 (northbound)

On-board services
- Class(es): Deluxe Coach Train, Through Sleeper service available
- Seating arrangements: Reclining seat coach, Tavern-lounge coach
- Sleeping arrangements: Open sections, roomettes, double bedrooms and compartments
- Catering facilities: Onboard dining car
- Entertainment facilities: Radio

Technical
- Rolling stock: Air conditioned cars built by the Pullman Company
- Track owner(s): Southern Railway

The Tennessean was a named passenger train jointly operated by the Norfolk and Western Railway (N&W) and the Southern Railway (SOU). Inaugurated on May 17, 1941, its route ran from Washington, DC, to Lynchburg, Virginia, on the SOU, then on to Bristol, Virginia, on the N&W, terminating at Memphis Union Station via the SOU. The St. Louis Southwestern Railway inaugurated a new passenger train, the Morning Star from Memphis to Dallas, specifically to provide close connections with the Tennessean at Memphis.

Intended to replace the Memphis Special as the preeminent carrier on the Washington–Memphis run, one of its critical duties was the transportation of mail for the Railway Mail Service division of the Post Office Department. The train's almost immediate success was further bolstered by a sharp rise in passenger traffic during World War II. The Tennessean carried a Bristol-Nashville sleeping car, a Chattanooga-Memphis sleeper, and a New York-Memphis sleeper. The heavyweight Pullman sleeping cars were painted silver to help them blend in with the train's stainless-steel, streamlined baggage cars, dining cars, coaches, and observation cars. Following World War II, streamlined sleeping cars replaced the heavyweight sleepers on the Tennessean.

The amenities provided on the Tennessean were gradually curtailed as Southern Railway attempted to reduce operating losses. By the early 1960s, the train carried only coaches and a single Pullman sleeper, in addition to the railway post office car and express and mail cars. Due to a decline in overall ridership, and Southern Railway's determination to escape the expensive burden of operating Memphis Union Station, the Tennessean was discontinued on March 30, 1968. This discontinuance ended all Southern Railway passenger train service to Memphis, allowing abandonment of Memphis Union Station.
