= Morning Star (train) =

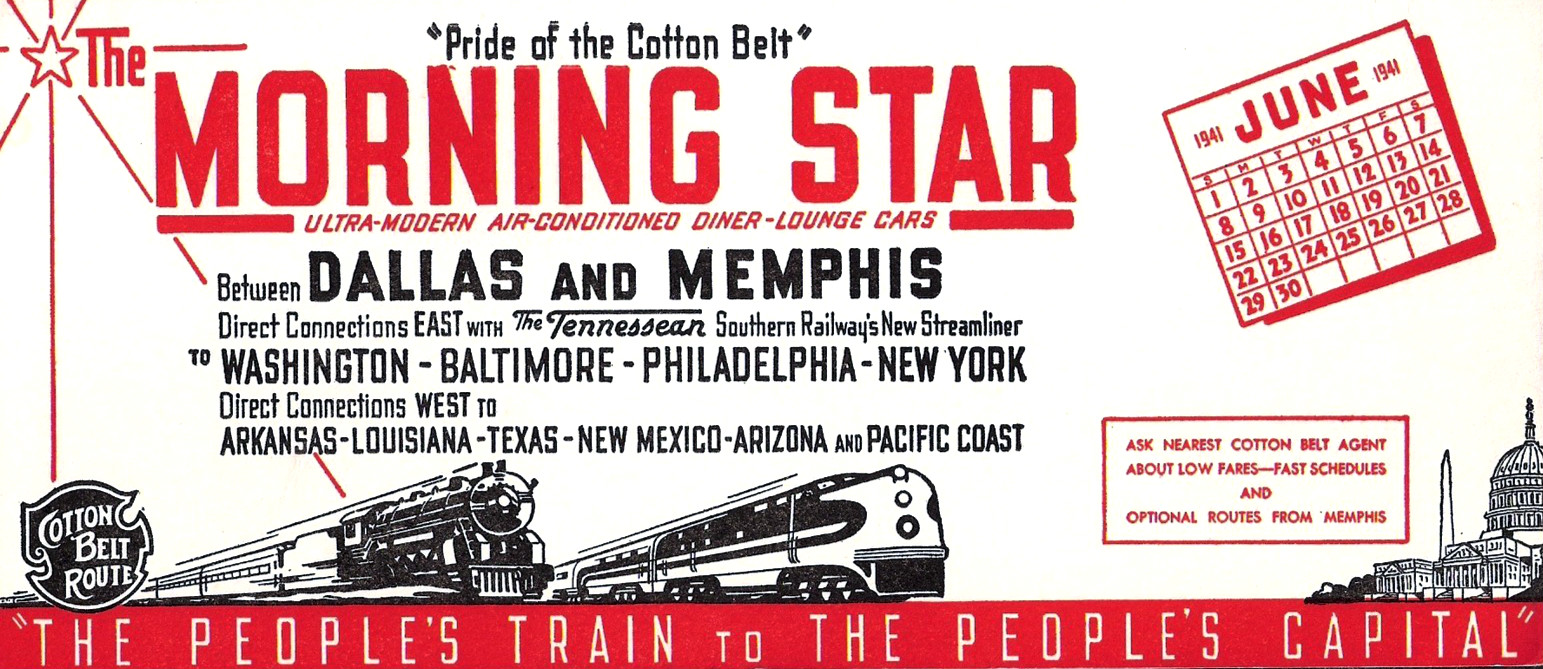
- Advertising blotter for the Morning Star in June 1941

Overview
- Service type: Inter-city rail
- Status: discontinued
- Locale: Southwestern United States
- First service: 1941
- Last service: c.1950
- Former operator: St. Louis Southwestern Railway

Route
- Termini: St. Louis, Missouri and Memphis, Tennessee; Dallas, Texas
- Service frequency: Daily
- Train numbers: 5 (southwest-bound), 6 (northeast-bound)

On-board services
- Seating arrangements: coach
- Sleeping arrangements: Sections, compartments and drawing room between St. Louis and Pine Bluff, Ark. (1950)
- Catering facilities: dining car (Jonesboro, Ark. - Dallas)

The Morning Star was a passenger train operated by St. Louis Southwestern Railway (Cotton Belt) between St. Louis and Dallas, designated as train numbers 5 (southbound) and 6 (northbound). From 1941 to 1950, the Morning Star also carried through cars from Memphis to Dallas, connecting with the main train at Brinkley, Arkansas. The Memphis connection for the Morning Star was added to permit Cotton Belt passenger trains to readily connect with the new Tennessean which had been inaugurated by Southern Railway in 1941. The Morning Star was replaced by unnamed train numbers 7 and 8 in November 1952, as a part of extensive passenger train restructuring by St. Louis Southwestern. The #7/#8 trains continued to the mid-1950s along the St. Louis - Dallas route, with coach and sleeping car service; however, food concession cars were eliminated.
