= Lone Star (St. Louis Southwestern train) =

Overview
- Service type: Inter-city rail
- Status: Discontinued
- Locale: Southwestern United States/Southeastern United States
- First service: 1928
- Last service: November 1, 1952
- Former operator(s): St. Louis Southwestern Railway

Route
- Termini: Memphis, Tennessee; Dallas, Texas
- Distance travelled: 481.4 miles (774.7 km)
- Service frequency: Daily
- Train number(s): Southwestbound: 1 Northeastbound: 2

On-board services
- Seating arrangements: Reclining seat coaches
- Sleeping arrangements: Sections and drawing room
- Catering facilities: Dining car
- Observation facilities: Observation car

The Lone Star was a passenger train operated by St. Louis Southwestern Railway (Cotton Belt) between Memphis, and Dallas, with through connections via Cotton Belt parent, Southern Pacific, for San Antonio, El Paso, and ultimately Los Angeles. There were also through cars operating between Memphis, Lewisville and Shreveport. At various times during the train's operation, connecting services were also provided from Brinkley to St. Louis. The train was discontinued on November 1, 1952, as a part of extensive passenger train restructuring by St. Louis Southwestern. The Lone Star was replaced by trains number 107 and 108 which connected with the Cotton Belt mainline at Mount Pleasant, Texas.
