= St. Louis Southwestern Railway =

Defunct American railway

St. Louis Southwestern Railway Company

- Cotton Belt system as of 1918

Overview
- Headquarters: St. Louis
- Reporting mark: SSW
- Locale: Arkansas, Illinois, Kansas, Louisiana, Missouri, New Mexico, Oklahoma, Tennessee and Texas
- Dates of operation: 1891–1992
- Successor: Southern Pacific Railroad; Union Pacific Railroad

Technical
- Track gauge: 4 ft 8 1/2 in (1,435 mm) standard gauge
- Length: 2,115 miles (3,404 km)

The St. Louis Southwestern Railway Company (reporting mark SSW), known by its nickname of "The Cotton Belt Route" or simply "Cotton Belt", was a Class I railroad that operated between St. Louis, Missouri, and various points in the U.S. states of Arkansas, Tennessee, Louisiana, and Texas from 1891 to 1980, when the system added the Rock Island's Golden State Route and operations in Kansas, Oklahoma, and New Mexico. The Cotton Belt operated as a Southern Pacific subsidiary from 1932 until 1992, when its operation was assumed by Southern Pacific Transportation Company.

== Corporate history ==
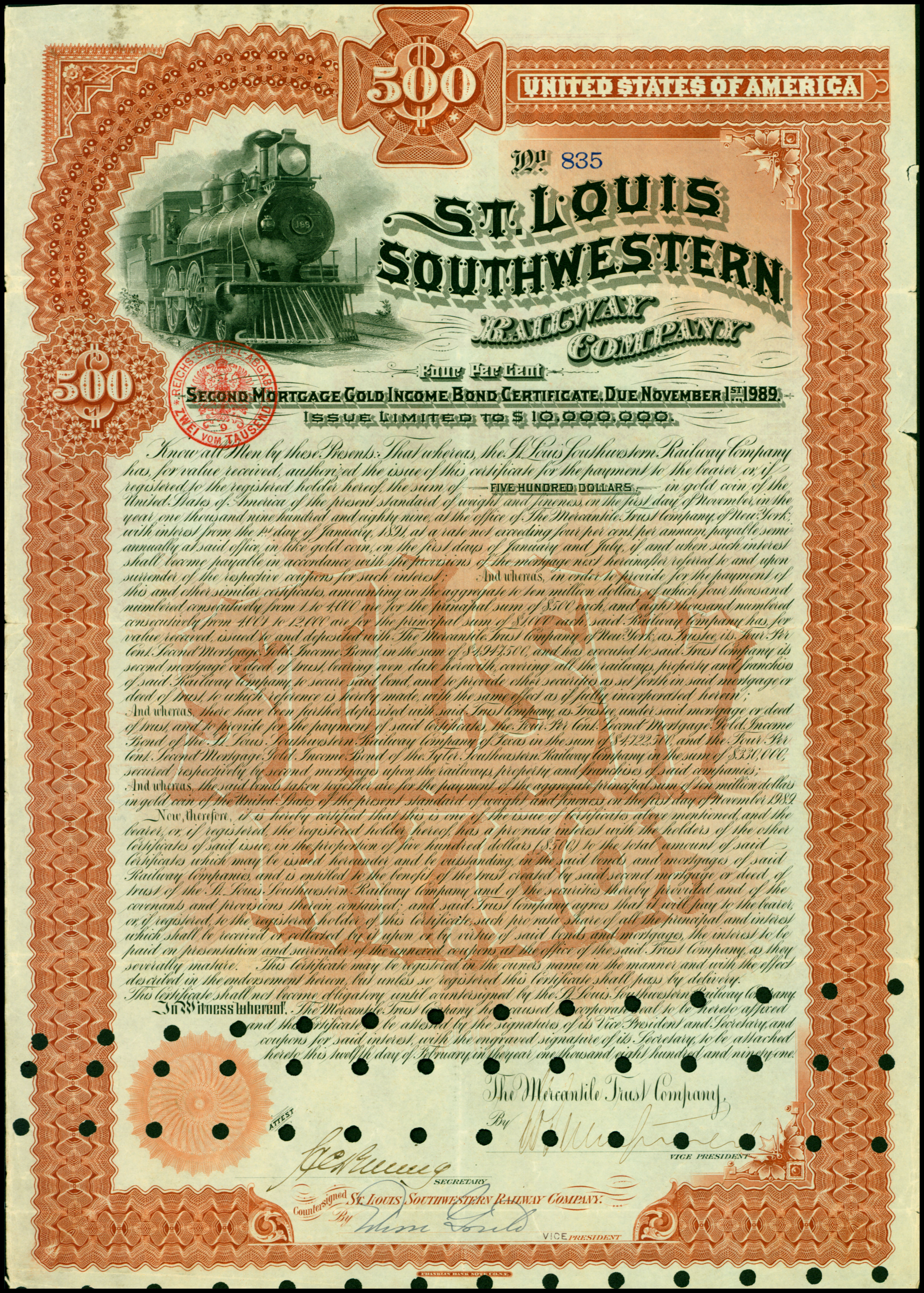
Bond of the St. Louis Southwestern Railway Company, issued 12. February 1891

The Cotton Belt was part of the railroad empire acquired by financier Jay Gould in the last quarter of the 19th century. "By 1890 Gould owned the Missouri Pacific, the Texas and Pacific, the St. Louis Southwestern, and the International-Great Northern, one-half of the mileage in the Southwest", the Handbook of Texas wrote.

The railroad was organized on January 15, 1891, although it had its origins in a line founded in Tyler, Texas, in 1871. Construction of the original Tyler Tap Railroad began in the summer of 1875, and the first 21 miles out of Tyler to Big Sandy, Texas were constructed by early October 1887. The line became the Texas and St. Louis Railway, and was completed between Gatesville, Texas and Bird's Point, Missouri by August 12, 1883, creating a continuous 725-mile system. However, that line promptly went into receivership, and was purchased by the St. Louis, Arkansas and Texas Railway in 1886. The assets of that company were acquired out of foreclosure by the St. Louis-Southwestern Railway in 1891.

On October 18, 1903, the Cotton Belt gained trackage rights over the Missouri Pacific Railroad along the eastern shore of the Mississippi River to reach East St. Louis, Illinois, and then used Terminal Railroad Association trackage rights into St. Louis. The Cotton Belt operated a freight station in downtown St. Louis, but its main base of operations in the area was its yard and a locomotive servicing facility in East St. Louis, just east of Valley Junction, and south of Alton and Southern Railroad's Gateway Yard, and north of Kansas City Southern's East St. Louis Yard. Union Pacific Railroad now operates Cotton Belt Yard, although the engine servicing facilities have been demolished.

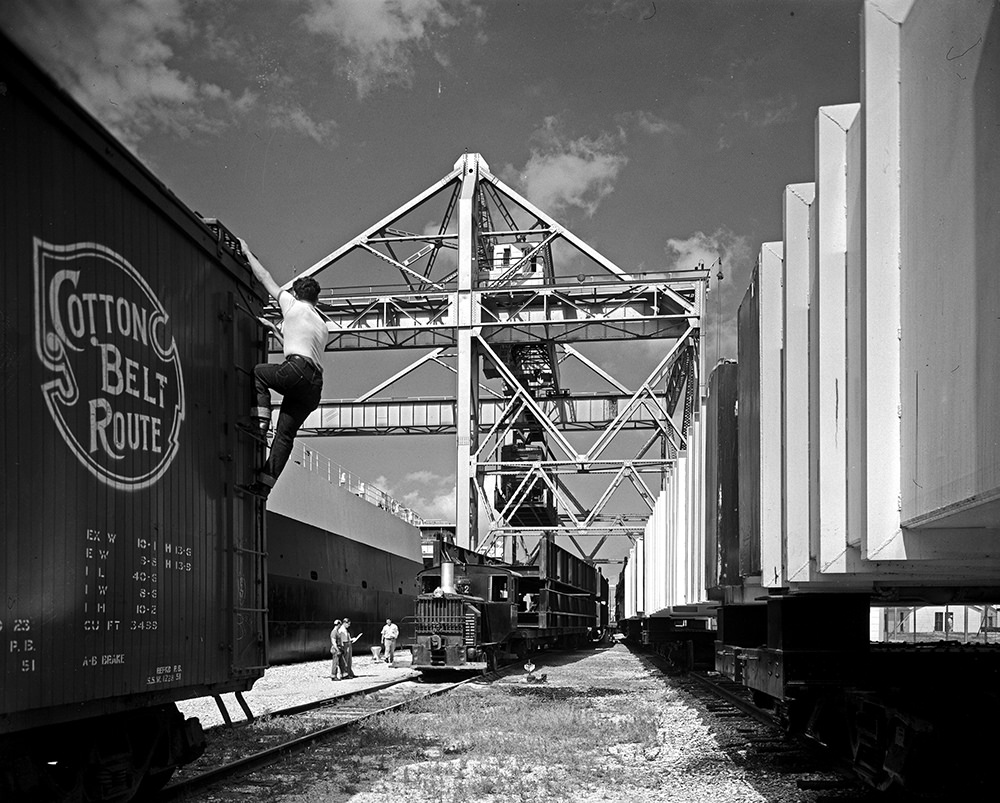
Cotton Belt boxcar at Texas City, Galveston County, Texas

The Cotton Belt and its subsidiary St. Louis Southwestern Railway of Texas operated 1,607 miles of road in 1945; 1,555 miles in 1965; and 2,115 miles in 1981 after taking over the Rock Island's Golden State Route. In 1925, SSW and SSW of Texas reported a total of 1,474 million net ton-miles of revenue freight and 75 million passenger-miles; in 1970 it carried 8,650 million ton-miles and no passengers.

The Southern Pacific Railroad (SP) assumed control of the SSW on April 14, 1932 and operated it as a subsidiary of SP until 1992, when the Southern Pacific consolidated the Cotton Belt's operations into the parent company. Southern Pacific merged with Union Pacific Railroad in 1996.

== Passenger service ==
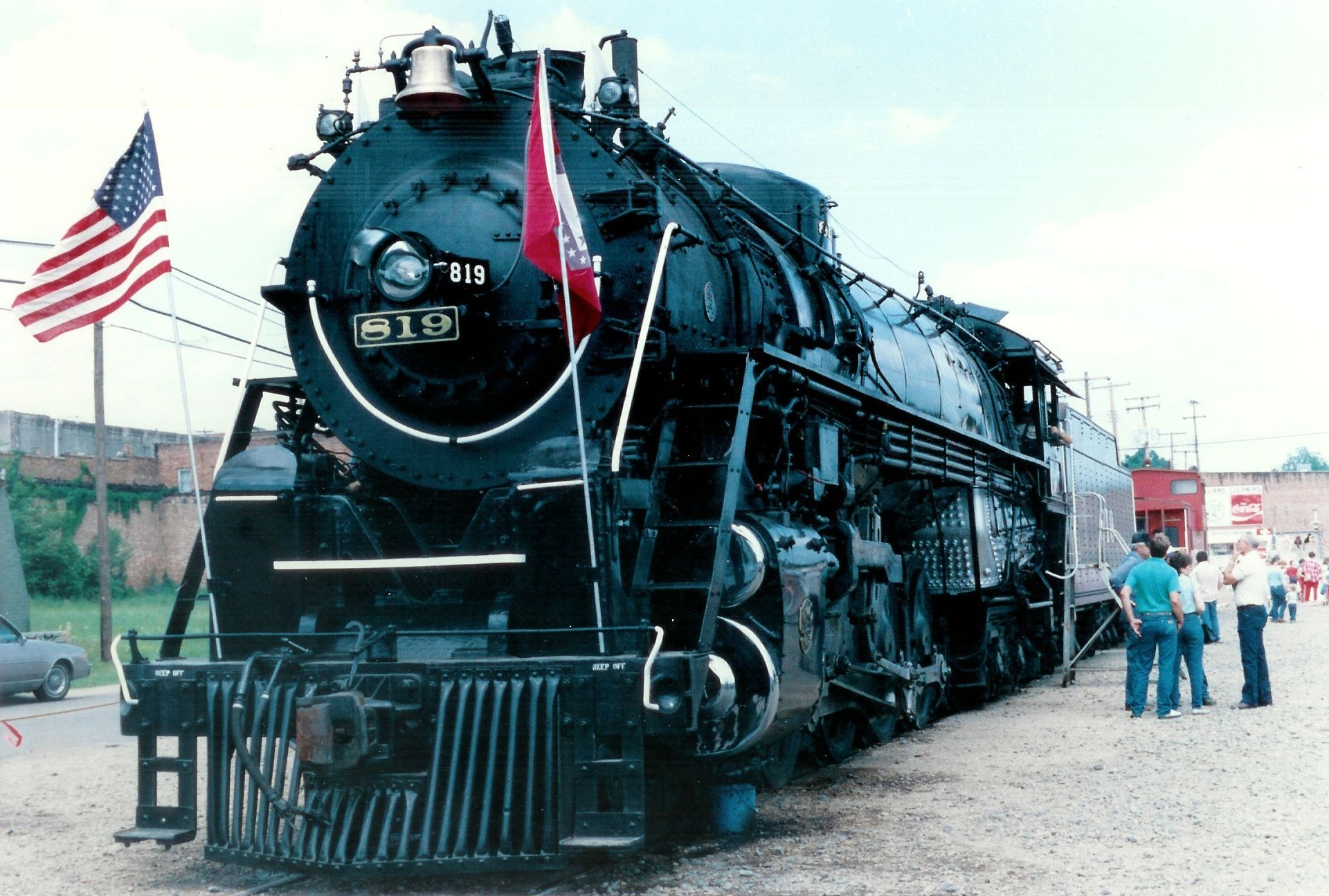
St. Louis Southwestern No. 819 attending the Cotton Belt Festival in Fordyce, Arkansas, in 1986

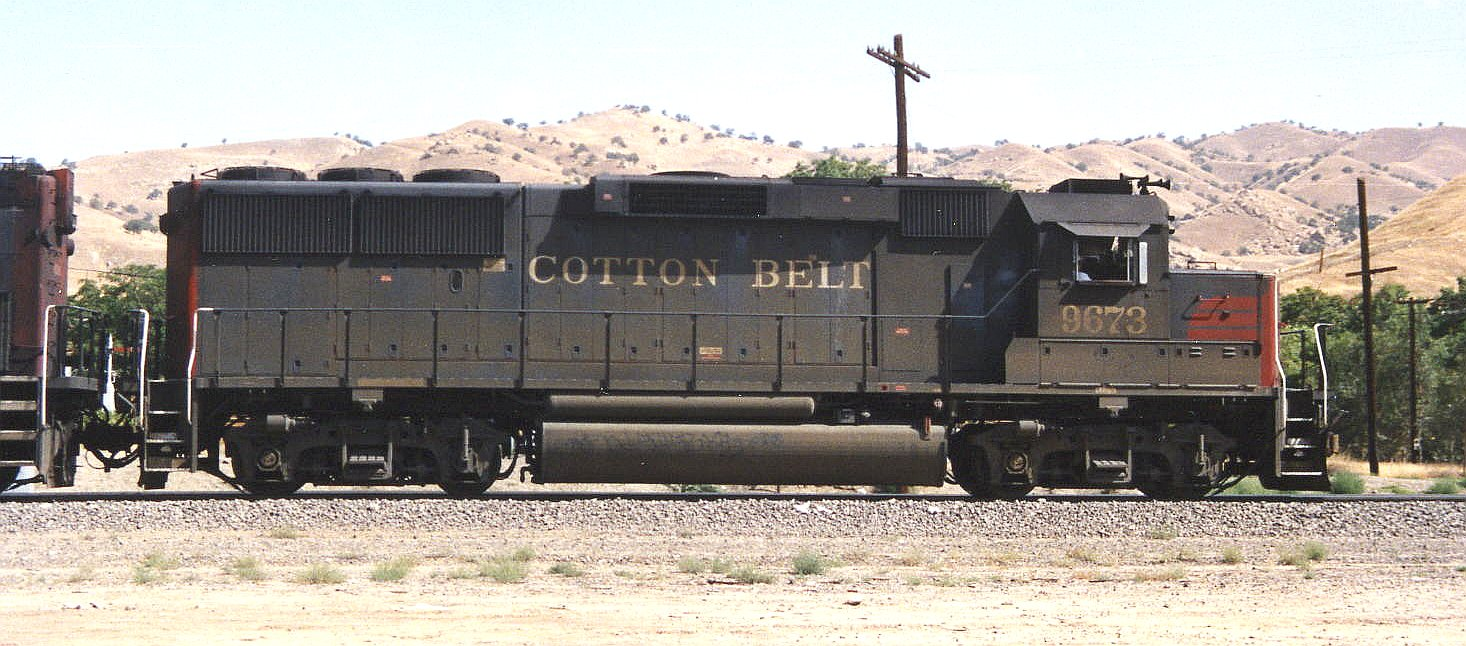
SSW EMD GP60 9673 in Caliente, California

The Cotton Belt ran passenger trains from St. Louis to Texas and from Memphis to Dallas and Shreveport, Louisiana. Cotton Belt's Lone Star operated from Memphis Union Station to Dallas Union Terminal with a connecting section from Lewisville, Arkansas, to Shreveport. The Morning Star was the second named train over much of this route, operating out of St. Louis Union Station to Dallas, with a separate Memphis section inaugurated in 1941 to provide a convenient connection with the Southern Railway's Tennessean to and from Washington, D.C., and New York City. The Cotton Belt also operated passenger trains between Mt. Pleasant, Tyler and Waco, and a doodlebug between Tyler and Lufkin.

The Cotton Belt began a series of passenger train cutbacks in the early 1950s. The railroad had 25 steam engines and four gas-electric motor cars available for passenger service in 1949. By late 1952 nine diesels had replaced the steam locomotives and motorcars and passenger train mileage had been trimmed considerably. The final operations in Texas involved overnight service between St. Louis and Dallas, with major intermediate stops in Jonesboro, Pine Bluff, Texarkana and Tyler. The Cotton Belt was one of the first Class 1 lines in the southwest to discontinue passenger service. The last Cotton Belt passenger train, #8, operated on November 30, 1959, from Pine Bluff, Arkansas, to East St. Louis, Illinois.

== Acquisitions ==
The following railroads were acquired or merged into the Cotton Belt Route:

- Blytheville, Leachville & Arkansas Southern Railroad - Basically an industrial line bringing timber to the Chicago Mill & Lumber Company near Blytheville AR. Operated 17 miles of owned track from a logging location known as Shaw AR to Leachville AR, from there had running rights 8 miles over the Frisco to Arbyrd, MO, from thereto had running rights over the Paragould Southeastern Railway for 22 miles to Chickasawba AR, then ran on 2.5 miles of owned track to the mill.
- Gideon & North Island Railroad
- Little River Valley & Arkansas Railroad
- Paragould Southeastern Railway - Incorporated October 11, 1887 as a tramway, it was reorganized as a standard gauge line in 1893 and by 1907 the line ran from Paragould, Arkansas to Blytheville, Arkansas. The St. Louis & Southwestern Railroad fully absorbed the line in January 1914.
- St. Louis, Arkansas & Texas Railway
- Stuttgart & Arkansas River Railroad
- Texas & St. Louis Railway

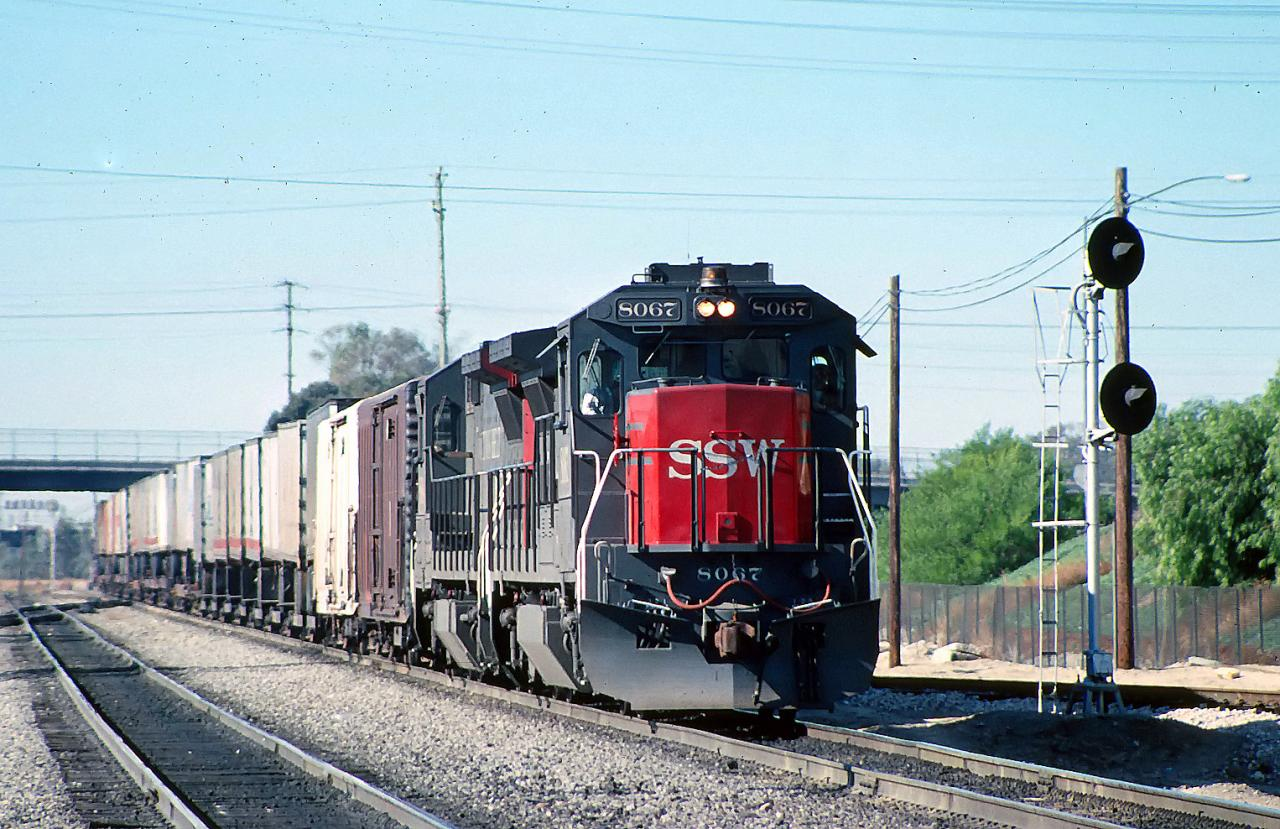
SSW GE B40-8 8067 in Colton, California

== Notable employees ==
- Louisiana politician Andrew R. Johnson (1856–1933) was once a depot agent for the Cotton Belt railroad.
- Railroad official Robert Krebs worked for Cotton Belt in the late 1960s and early 1970s as a trainmaster and terminal superintendent. Krebs became superintendent of the Cotton Belt at age 29 in 1971.

== See also ==
- Cotton Belt Depot Train Museum
- St. Louis Southwestern Railway of Texas
- Arkansas Railroad Museum

== Bibliography ==
- Moody's Steam Railroads, 1949.
- Moody's Transportation Manual, 1968.
- Goen, Steve Allen. Cotton Belt Color Pictorial, Four Ways West Publications, 1999, ISBN 1-885614-25-X.
- Eighty Years of Transportation Progress: A History of the St. Louis Southwestern Railway (Cotton Belt Public Relations Department, 1957) as published in the October 1957 issue of The Cotton Belt News.
