= List of major cities in the United States lacking inter-city rail service =

Many major cities and regional population centers in the United States lack any form of inter-city passenger rail service, which would typically be provided by Amtrak. Six metropolitan statistical areas of more than one million residents do not have inter-city train service, nor do the states of South Dakota or Wyoming. There are no international passenger trains between the United States and Mexico, nor to Canada outside of Ontario, Montreal, and Vancouver.

== Cities lacking inter-city rail service ==
For purposes of this list, a city is considered served if it is within 35 miles (56 km) of an Amtrak or other inter-city passenger rail station. However, some of these cities may be served directly by Amtrak Thruway services. Unless otherwise noted, the provider of the last passenger service is noted in each of the following cities was Amtrak. A partial list of the cities with a greater metropolitan population of over 100,000 that are not served by some form of inter-city rail service is as follows (in order by decreasing population):

City	Metropolitan area population (2019 est.)	Last active station	Notes
Las Vegas, Nevada	2,266,715	Las Vegas station	Last service was the Desert Wind in 1997. Planned high-speed rail service by Brightline West to Enterprise, Nevada expected in 2028. Amtrak service is also proposed under the American Jobs Plan.
Columbus, Ohio	2,122,271	Columbus Union Station	Last service was the National Limited in 1979. Largest city in the United States without rail transport of any kind. Amtrak service is proposed under the American Jobs Plan.
Nashville, Tennessee	2,012,476	Nashville Union Station	Last inter-city service was the Floridian in 1979. Amtrak service is proposed under the American Jobs Plan while a Nashville route has been in early talks since January 2020. Early funding has been provided for Nashville–Atlanta passenger rail. The WeGo Star provides limited commuter rail service, but does not connect to the inter-city rail network.
Louisville, Kentucky	1,395,855	Louisville Union Station	Last service was the Kentucky Cardinal in 2003. Amtrak service is proposed under the American Jobs Plan.
Tulsa, Oklahoma	1,023,988	Tulsa Union Depot	Last service was the Santa Fe's The Tulsan in 1971. Several plans for rail service have been proposed, but all of them have fallen through.
Honolulu, Hawaii	1,016,508		Last service was by the Oahu Railway and Land Company in the late 1930s or early 1940s. New Skyline rapid transit line opened on June 30, 2023.
Knoxville, Tennessee	879,773	Southern Terminal	Last service was the Southern Railway's Pelican in 1970.
McAllen, Texas	870,781	McAllen Central Station	Last service was the Southern Pacific's McAllen-Brownsville shuttle in 1952.
Baton Rouge, Louisiana	854,884	Baton Rouge station	Last service was the Kansas City Southern's Southern Belle in 1969. New service from New Orleans has been studied and has support. Amtrak service is also proposed under the American Jobs Plan.
Allentown – Bethlehem – Easton, Pennsylvania	844,046	Allentown station (LV)	Last service was regional service in 1981, carried by SEPTA. Amtrak service is proposed under the American Jobs Plan.
Allentown – Bethlehem – Easton, Pennsylvania	844,046	Bethlehem Union Station	Last service was regional service in 1981, carried by SEPTA. Amtrak service is proposed under the American Jobs Plan.
North Port – Sarasota – Bradenton, Florida – Venice, Florida	836,995	Bradenton Atlantic Coast Line Depot; Sarasota Atlantic Coast Line Depot	Last service was the Seaboard Coast Line's Champion in 1971.
Dayton, Ohio - Springfield, Ohio	807,611	Dayton Union Station	Last service was the National Limited in 1979. Amtrak service is proposed under the American Jobs Plan.
Boise, Idaho	764,718	Boise Union Pacific Depot	Last service was the Pioneer in 1997.
Cape Coral, Florida - Fort Myers, Florida	760,822		Last service was the Seaboard Coast Line's Champion in 1971.
Colorado Springs, Colorado	755,105	Colorado Springs Santa Fe Depot	Last service was Burlington Route's Texas Zephyr in 1967. New service planned as a new section of the Southwest Chief to Colorado Springs under study. Amtrak service is also proposed under the American Jobs Plan.
Des Moines, Iowa	699,292	Des Moines Rock Island Depot	Last service was a Rock Island unnamed successor (ending in 1970) to the Des Moines Rocket and Corn Belt Rocket, both ending in 1967. There were plans for a new service from Chicago to Des Moines and Omaha but Iowa refused to provide funds for operations.
Augusta, Georgia	608,980	Augusta Union Station	Last traditional passenger service was by the Georgia Railroad in 1969, although the Georgia provided the Georgia Cannonball, a little-used mixed train service until 1983.
Space Coast area (Cocoa Beach – Melbourne – Palm Bay – Titusville, Florida)	601,942	Cocoa-Rockledge station Melbourne station	Last had passenger service in 1968, when the Florida East Coast Railroad ended its operations. The last interstate trains were in 1963 when the East Coast Champion and City of Miami routes were moved inland from the Atlantic Coast. The Havana Special ended entirely that year. However, a private regional rail line, Brightline, is now open Miami-Orlando via the Space Coast, using the FEC right-of-way, and a newly built segment Cocoa Beach-Orlando. An infill station is planned for the Space Coast in Cocoa Beach, where Brightline has already bought land for a station.
Chattanooga, Tennessee	565,194	Terminal Station	Last service was the Louisville and Nashville's The Georgian in 1971. New service possible via proposed Nashville route and the American Jobs Plan mentioned above.
Scranton – Wilkes-Barre, Pennsylvania	553,885	Scranton station (DL&W)	Last service was the Erie Lackawanna's Lake Cities in 1970. Amtrak service is proposed under the American Jobs Plan as part of the Lackawanna Cut-Off Restoration Project.
Youngstown, Ohio	536,081	Youngstown station (B&O)	Last service was the Three Rivers in 2005.
Fayetteville, Arkansas	534,901	Fayetteville Frisco Depot	Last service was a section of the Frisco's Meteor in 1965.
Tri-Cities area (Kingsport/Johnson City/Bristol, Tennessee, Bristol, Virginia)	530,385	Bristol station	Last service was the Norfolk and Western and Southern Railway's unnamed successor train to their Birmingham Special in 1971. Virginia officials are working on bringing Amtrak service to Bristol.
Lexington, Kentucky	517,056		Last service was the Southern Railway's Royal Palm in 1970 and the Chesapeake and Ohio's George Washington in 1971.
Pensacola, Florida	502,629	Pensacola station	Service suspended August 2005, on Sunset Limited east of New Orleans after Hurricane Katrina. It is proposed to return service to the line.
Myrtle Beach, South Carolina	496,901	Myrtle Beach Atlantic Coast Line Railroad Station	Last service was a mixed train operated by the Atlantic Coast Line Railroad in 1955.
Treasure Coast area (Fort Pierce - Port St. Lucie – Sebastian – Vero Beach, Florida)	489,297	Vero Beach station Fort Pierce station Stuart station	Last had passenger service in 1968, when the Florida East Coast Railroad ended its operations. The last interstate trains were in 1963 when the East Coast Champion and City of Miami routes were moved inland from the Atlantic Coast. The Havana Special ended entirely that year. However, a private regional rail service, Brightline, is now open Miami-Orlando via the Treasure Coast, using the FEC right-of-way, and a newly built segment Cocoa Beach-Orlando. An infill station is planned for Stuart and could begin as early as 2026.
Huntsville, Alabama	471,824	Huntsville Depot	Last service was the Southern Railway's Tennessean in 1968.
Springfield, Missouri	470,300	Springfield station	Last service was the Frisco's Meteor and Will Rogers in 1967.
Asheville, North Carolina	462,680	Asheville Southern Railway Passenger Depot	Last service was the Southern Railway's Asheville Special in 1975. Amtrak service is proposed under the American Jobs Plan.
Corpus Christi, Texas	429,024	Corpus Christi station	Last service was the Texas Mexican Railway's Tex-Mex Express in 1989.
Brownsville, Texas	423,163	Brownsville station	Last service was the Missouri Pacific Railroad's Pioneer in 1964.
Manchester – Nashua, New Hampshire	417,025	Manchester Union Station	Last service was unnamed successor train to the Boston and Maine's Alouette in 1965. Amtrak service is proposed under the American Jobs Plan. Extension of MBTA's Lowell Line is also proposed.
Salisbury – Ocean City, Maryland	415,726	Salisbury Union Station	Last service was the Pennsylvania Railroad's Del-Mar-Va Express in 1958.
Appleton – Oshkosh – Neenah, Wisconsin	409,881		Last service was an unnamed Chicago and North Western train in 1971, having been previously served by the CNW's Peninsula 400. At least part of the area could see proposed Amtrak service under the American Jobs Plan.
Peoria, Illinois	400,561	Peoria station	Last service was the Prairie Marksman in 1981. However, Amtrak continued to stop at Chillicothe, 20 miles (32 km) north, until 1996. New service to Peoria was studied by Illinois DOT.
Shreveport – Bossier City, Louisiana	394,706	Shreveport Union Station	Last service was the Kansas City Southern's Southern Belle in 1969. Planned Amtrak service from Birmingham to Dallas/Fort Worth via Shreveport never materialized, service from the city to Dallas being studied by DOT.
Tallahassee, Florida	387,227	Tallahassee station	Service suspended August 2005, on Sunset Limited east of New Orleans after Hurricane Katrina. It is proposed to return service to the line.
Naples, Florida	384,902		Last service was an Atlantic Coast Line connector service to the West Coast Champion in 1960, between Ft. Myers and Naples.
Clermont, Florida - Leesburg, Florida	383,956		Last service was Seaboard Coast Line local Jacksonville - St. Petersburg service in 1971.
Quad Cities area (Davenport/Bettendorf, Iowa, Rock Island/Moline, Illinois)	379,172	Rock Island station	Last service was the Rock Island's Quad Cities Rocket in 1979. A proposed line that would use the same name would bring service back to Moline and is supported by local officials and the American Jobs Plan.
Quad Cities area (Davenport/Bettendorf, Iowa, Rock Island/Moline, Illinois)	379,172	Moline station	Last service was the Rock Island's Quad Cities Rocket in 1979. A proposed line that would use the same name would bring service back to Moline and is supported by local officials and the American Jobs Plan.
Montgomery, Alabama	373,290	Montgomery Union Station	Last service was the Gulf Breeze in 1995. Amtrak service is proposed under the American Jobs Plan.
Hickory–Lenoir–Morganton, North Carolina	369,711		Last service was the North Carolina branch of the Southern Railway's Carolina Special in 1968. At least part of the area could see proposed Amtrak service under the American Jobs Plan.
Fort Collins, Colorado	356,899	Fort Collins station	Last service was the Burlington Route's Shoshone in 1967. Amtrak service is proposed under the American Jobs Plan.
Midland – Odessa, Texas	348,826		Last service was the Missouri Pacific's West Texas Eagle in 1969.
Ocala, Florida	343,254	Ocala Union Station	Last service was the Palmetto in 2004, when Amtrak truncated the run to Savannah, Georgia.
Rockford, Illinois	336,116		Last service was the Black Hawk in 1981. New service via a restoration of the train route, was planned by 2015 was suspended by Illinois Governor Bruce Rauner, but was restarted in 2019 by Governor J.B. Pritzker. As of 2023, Metra is planned to operate the service.
Gainesville, Florida	329,128	Gainesville station	Last service was a Seaboard Coast Line train connecting to the Champion
Greeley, Colorado	324,492	Greeley station	Last service was the Pioneer in 1997.
Green Bay, Wisconsin	322,906	Green Bay station (CNW)	Last service were unnamed Chicago and North Western trains in 1971, having been previously served by the CNW's Flambeau 400 and Peninsula 400. At least part of the area could see proposed Amtrak service under the American Jobs Plan.
Lubbock, Texas	322,257	Lubbock station	Last service was the Santa Fe's unnamed service between Temple and Clovis, New Mexico, ending between 1968 and 1970.
Columbus, Georgia	321,048		Last service was the Illinois Central's City of Miami in 1971. Amtrak service is proposed under the American Jobs Plan.
Evansville, Indiana	315,086	Evansville Station (Louisville and Nashville)	Last service was the Louisville and Nashville's The Georgian in 1971.
Clarksville, Tennessee	307,820	Clarksville station	Last service was a Memphis section of the L&N's Pan-American in 1965.
Wilmington, North Carolina	297,533	Wilmington Union Station	Last service was the Seaboard Coast Line's Palmetto in 1968. Amtrak service is proposed under the American Jobs Plan.
Twin Ports area (Duluth, Minnesota, Superior, Wisconsin)	288,732	Duluth Depot	Last service was the North Star in 1985. There are plans to restore passenger service from St. Paul with a new train called the Northern Lights Express, although the owner of the train is currently unknown. Amtrak service is also supported under the American Jobs Plan.
Twin Ports area (Duluth, Minnesota, Superior, Wisconsin)	288,732	Superior Union Station	Last service was the North Star in 1985. There are plans to restore passenger service from St. Paul with a new train called the Northern Lights Express, although the owner of the train is currently unknown. Amtrak service is also supported under the American Jobs Plan.
Crestview – Fort Walton Beach – Destin, Florida	286,973	Crestview station	Service suspended August 2005, on Sunset Limited east of New Orleans after Hurricane Katrina. It is proposed to return service to the line.
Laredo, Texas	276,652	Laredo station	Last service was the Texas Mexican Railway's Tex-Mex Express in 1989. Last Amtrak service was the Inter-American in 1981.
Cedar Rapids, Iowa	276,520	Cedar Rapids Union Station	Last service was the Rock Island's Zephyr Rocket on April 8, 1967, with the Milwaukee Road ending service on the combined "City of Everywhere" on May 30, 1971, at nearby Marion. Amtrak service is proposed in Iowa City, Iowa 20 miles (32 km) to the south under the American Jobs Plan.
Sioux Falls, South Dakota	268,232	Sioux Falls station (Rock Island)	Last service was a Sioux Falls section of the Milwaukee Road's Arrow in September 1965.
Amarillo, Texas	265,053	Amarillo station	Last service was the Santa Fe's San Francisco Chief in 1971.
College Station – Bryan, Texas	264,728		Last service was the Dallas-Houston section of the Texas Eagle in 1995. Texas Central Railway service is projected to operate in the vicinity in 2026. Amtrak service is also proposed under the American Jobs Plan.
Bloomsburg–Berwick–Sunbury, Pennsylvania	259,332		Last service was a Penn Central remnant of the Pennsylvania Railroad's Buffalo Day Express in 1971.
Yakima, Washington	250,873		Last service was in 1981 when the Empire Builder was rerouted through Everett, Washington.
Fort Smith, Arkansas	250,368		Last service was a section of the Frisco's Meteor in 1965.
Binghamton, New York	238,691	Binghamton station	Last service was the Erie Lackawanna's Lake Cities in 1970.
Macon, Georgia	229,996	Macon Terminal Station	Last service was the Central of Georgia's Nancy Hanks II in 1971. Amtrak service between Atlanta and Savannah with a stop in Macon is proposed under the American Jobs Plan.
Rochester, Minnesota	221,921		Last service was the Chicago and North Western Railroad's Rochester 400 in 1963.
Medford, Oregon	220,944	Medford Southern Pacific Depot	Last service was the Southern Pacific's Rogue River in the 1950s.
Las Cruces, New Mexico	218,195		Last service was the Santa Fe's El Pasoan in 1968.
Lima–Van Wert–Celina, Ohio	217,454		Last service was in 1991, when the Broadway Limited and the Capitol Limited were rerouted.
Athens, Georgia	213,750		Last service was the Seaboard Coast Line's Silver Comet in 1969.
Jacksonville, North Carolina	204,576		Last service was local connector service by the Atlantic Coast Line Railroad, c. 1939.
Monroe, Louisiana	200,261		Last service was a Little Rock-Alexandria section of the Missouri Pacific's Texas Eagle in 1967; and the Southwestern Limited also in 1967.
Bend, Oregon	197,692		Last service was a regional mixed train run by the Burlington Northern Railroad in 1971.
Spring Hill - Brooksville, Florida	194,515	Brooksville station	Last service was local Jacksonville - St. Petersburg service in 1955 or 1956, run by the Atlantic Coast Line Railroad. Nearby Dade City had Amtrak service with the Palmetto until that train was truncated to Savannah in 2004.
Warner Robins, Georgia	191,614	Warner Robins Depot	Last service was the Southern Railway's Royal Palm in 1967.
Saginaw, Michigan	190,539	East Saginaw station	Last service was the New York Central's local service to the area in 1964.
Punta Gorda – Port Charlotte – Boca Grande, Florida	188,910	Punta Gorda Atlantic Coast Line Depot	Last service was a section of the Seaboard Coast Line Railroad's pre-Amtrak Champion in 1971.
Terre Haute, Indiana	186,367	Terre Haute station	Last service was the National Limited in 1979.
Billings, Montana	184,167	Billings station	Last service was the North Coast Hiawatha in 1979.
Dover, Delaware	180,786		Last service was the Pennsylvania Railroad's Blue Diamond in 1965.
St. George, Utah	180,279		Although no line (nor any railroad tracks) runs through, the city has Amtrak Thruway services.
Joplin, Missouri	179,564	Joplin Union Depot	Last service was the Kansas City Southern's Southern Belle in 1969.
Bowling Green, Kentucky	179,240	Bowling Green station (Louisville and Nashville)	Last service was the Floridian in 1979.
Elmira – Corning, New York	178,832		Last service was the Erie Lackawanna's Lake Cities in 1970.
Jackson, Tennessee	178,644		Last service the Illinois Central's City of Miami train in 1971.
Panama City, Florida	174,705		Last service was Atlanta and St. Andrews Bay Railroad passenger service in 1957.
Muskegon, Michigan	173,566	Muskegon station	Last service was the Chesapeake and Ohio Railway's passenger service in 1971.
Iowa City, Iowa	173,105		Last service was a Rock Island unnamed successor (ending in c. 1970) to the Des Moines Rocket and Corn Belt Rocket, both ending in 1967. New service was possible around 2016, but did not work out. Amtrak service is proposed under the American Jobs Plan.
Abilene, Texas	172,060		Last service was the Missouri Pacific's West Texas Eagle in 1969.
East Stroudsburg, Pennsylvania	170,271	East Stroudsburg station	Last service was the Erie Lackawanna's Lake Cities in 1970. Amtrak service is proposed as part of the Lackawanna Cut-Off Restoration Project.
Greenville - Winterville, North Carolina	170,243		Last service was on the first Norfolk Southern's Norfolk-Raleigh main line, ca. late 1940s.
Eau Claire – Menomonie, Wisconsin	169,304	Eau Claire station	Last service was the Chicago and North Western Railroad's Twin Cities 400 in 1963. Amtrak service is proposed under the American Jobs Plan.
Bloomington, Indiana	169,230		Last service was the Floridian in 1979.
Waterloo – Cedar Falls, Iowa	168,522		Last service was the Illinois Central's Hawkeye in 1971.
Pueblo, Colorado	168,424	Pueblo Union Depot	Last service was a Denver-La Junta connecting train operated by the Santa Fe Railway in 1971. New service planned as a new section of the Southwest Chief to Colorado Springs under study. Amtrak service is also proposed under the American Jobs Plan.
Blacksburg – Christiansburg, Virginia	167,531	Christiansburg station	Last service was the Hilltopper in 1979. New service being studied by VDOT. Amtrak service is also proposed under the American Jobs Plan. Construction is underway at Christiansburg for the return of Amtrak by the end of 2027.
Tupelo, Mississippi	166,379	Tupelo station	Last service was the Frisco's Southland in 1967.
Auburn – Opelika, Alabama	164,542		Last service was the Illinois Central Railroad's City of Miami serving Opelika, part of the Auburn MSA, which had its last run in 1971. Amtrak service is proposed under the American Jobs Plan.
Janesville, Wisconsin	163,354	Janesville station	Last service was the Lake Country Limited in 2001.
Wausau – Marshfield, Wisconsin	163,285	Wausau station	Last service was the Soo Line's Laker in 1965
Chambersburg – Waynesboro, Pennsylvania	155,027		Last service was the Pennsylvania Railroad's Nos. 638-645 (part of unnamed New York-Roanoke route via the Norfolk & Western's Shenandoah Route) in 1962.
Idaho Falls, Idaho metropolitan area	154,855		The last long-distance train was the Union Pacific's Butte Special in 1971.
Elizabethtown, Kentucky	153,928		Last service was the L&N's Pan-American in 1971.
Concord, New Hampshire	153,808	Concord Station	Last service was unnamed successor train to the Boston and Maine's Alouette in 1965. Amtrak service is proposed under the American Jobs Plan.
Decatur, Alabama	152,603		Last service was the Floridian in 1979.
Bangor, Maine	152,148	Bangor Union Station	Last service was the Boston and Maine's State of Maine Express and Bar Harbor Express in 1960. Extension of Downeaster service studied.
Alexandria, Louisiana	152,037		Last service was the Kansas City Southern's Southern Belle in 1969.
Wichita Falls, Texas	151,254		Last service was the Burlington Route's Texas Zephyr in 1967. Although still in the planning phase, local officials are currently working to potentially bring an Amtrak stop to the city.
Traverse City, Michigan	150,475		Last service was an unnamed successor C&O/B&O Railroad train to the Resort Special in 1967. New service under study.
Homosassa Springs, Florida	149,657		Last service was Atlantic Coast Line Railroad passenger service in 1957.
Vineland – Millville – Bridgeton, New Jersey	149,527		Last service was Pennsylvania-Reading Seashore Lines commuter rail service in 1971.
Parkersburg – Vienna, West Virginia – Marietta, Ohio	149,469		Last service was the Shenandoah in 1981.
Ithaca – Cortland, New York	149,381	Ithaca station (LV)	Last service was the Lehigh Valley's Maple Leaf in 1961.
Dothan, Alabama	149,358	Dothan station	Last service was the Floridian in 1979.
Valdosta, Georgia	148,126	Valdosta station	Last service was the Floridian in 1979.
Florence – Muscle Shoals, Alabama	147,970		Last service was the Southern Railway's Tennessean in 1968.
Albany, Georgia	146,726	Albany station	Last service was the Illinois Central's City of Miami in 1971.
Dalton, Georgia	144,724	Dalton station	Last service was the Louisville and Nashville's The Georgian in 1971. Amtrak service is proposed under the American Jobs Plan.
Sioux City, Iowa	144,701	Sioux City station	Last service was the Illinois Central's Hawkeye in 1971.
Rapid City, South Dakota	142,107	Rapid City station	Last service was the Milwaukee Road's Sioux in 1951, when the run was truncated to Canton, South Dakota.
Sumter, South Carolina	140,466		Last service was a Florence, SC—Augusta, GA section of the Seaboard Coast Line's Champion in 1970.
Morgantown, West Virginia	139,044	Morgantown station	Last service was an unnamed Baltimore and Ohio Railroad train in 1953.
Wheeling, West Virginia	138,948	Wheeling station	Last service was the Baltimore and Ohio's Chicago-West Virginia Night Express in 1961.
Morristown, Tennessee	137,612		Last service was the Southern Railway's Birmingham Special in 1970.
Eureka, California	135,839		Last service was a local Northwestern Pacific Railroad train in 1971.
Jonesboro, Arkansas	134,196		Last service was the Frisco Railway's Southland in 1967.
The Villages, Florida	132,420		Last service was the Palmetto in 2004, when Amtrak truncated the run to Savannah, Georgia.
Manhattan, Kansas	130,285		Last service was the Union Pacific's City of Kansas City in 1971.
Bismarck, North Dakota	128,949		Last service was the North Coast Hiawatha in 1979.
Jamestown – Dunkirk – Fredonia, New York	126,636		Last service was the Erie Lackawanna's Lake Cities in 1970. Amtrak's Lake Shore Limited passes through Dunkirk, but does not stop.
Lawton, Oklahoma	126,415		Last service was the Frisco's Meteor in 1967.
New Bern, North Carolina	124,284		Last service was the Atlantic and East Carolina Railway's regional service in 1950 or 1951.
Augusta – Waterville, Maine	122,241		Last service was the Boston and Maine's State of Maine Express and Bar Harbor Express in 1960.
St. Joseph, Missouri	121,467		Last service was the Burlington Northern's unnamed service between Kansas City and Omaha in 1971.
Mansfield, Ohio	121,154		Last service was the Penn Central's Manhattan Limited and Pennsylvania Limited, both in 1971.
Missoula, Montana	119,600	Missoula station (NP)	Last service was the North Coast Hiawatha in 1979.
Owensboro, Kentucky	119,440		Last service was an unnamed L&N train in 1958.
Bozeman, Montana	118,960	Bozeman station	Last service was the North Coast Hiawatha in 1979.
Brunswick, Georgia	118,779		Last service was the Southern Railway's Kansas City-Florida Special in 1964.
Sheboygan, Wisconsin	118,034		Last service was an unnamed Chicago and North Western train in 1971, having been previously served by the Peninsula 400.
Watertown – Fort Drum, New York	116,721		Last service was the New York Central Railroad's regional service in 1964.
Temecula, California	114,761	None	Never had train service.
Muncie, Indiana	114,135	Muncie Depot (CR&M)	Last service was the Cardinal in 1986, when Amtrak rerouted the train west.
Cleveland, Tennessee	113,358	Cleveland station (Southern Railway)	Last service was the Southern Railway's Birmingham Special in 1970.
Williamsport, Pennsylvania	113,299		Last service was a Penn Central remnant of the Pennsylvania Railroad's Buffalo Day Express in 1971.
Lewiston – Auburn, Maine	111,139	Lewiston station	Last direct service was the Boston and Maine Railroad's and Maine Central Railroad's The Gull in 1960. Grand Trunk Western summer service to nearby Danville Junction ended in 1967.
Mt. Pleasant, Michigan - Alma, Michigan	110,583		Last service was the Ann Arbor Railroad's Toledo - Frankfort service in 1950.
Fond du Lac, Wisconsin	104,154	Fond du Lac station	Last service was an unnamed Chicago and North Western train in 1971, having been previously served by the CNW's Peninsula 400. At least part of the area could see proposed Amtrak service under the American Jobs Plan.
Decatur, Illinois	103,998	Decatur station	Last service was the Illini in 1983, when the run was truncated to Champaign, Illinois.
Bay City, Michigan	103,856		Last service was the New York Central Railroad's regional service in 1964.
Gettysburg, Pennsylvania	103,852	Gettysburg station	Last service was Western Maryland Railway passenger service in 1942.
Mankato, Minnesota	103,612	Mankato Union Depot	Last service was the Chicago and North Western Railway's Minnesota 400 in 1963.
Cheyenne, Wyoming	100,512	Cheyenne Depot	Last service was the Pioneer in 1997. Amtrak service is proposed under the American Jobs Plan.
Dubuque, Iowa	100,388	Dubuque station	Last service was the Black Hawk in 1981. New service proposed as an extension of the proposed Rockford service mentioned above.

== Cities with nearby services ==
In addition, the following cities are not directly served by inter-city rail service, but have a rail station within 35 miles (56 km) of the city.

City	Metropolitan area population (2019 est.)	Last active station	Notes
Phoenix, and Mesa, Arizona	4,948,203	Phoenix Union Station	Direct service ended in June 1996 when Amtrak rerouted the Sunset Limited 30 miles (48 km) south to Maricopa, Arizona, after Southern Pacific (now part of the Union Pacific) threatened to abandon the line from Yuma. Phoenix remains connected via Amtrak Thruway motorcoach service to the Southwest Chief at Flagstaff and to the Sunset Limited at Maricopa. Restored Amtrak service is proposed under the American Jobs Plan.
Frisco/McKinney/Plano, Texas	1,064,465		Service 20 miles (32 km) miles to the south in Dallas.
Albany, New York	880,381	Albany Union Station	Lost direct service in 1981 when intercity service was shifted to adjacent Rensselaer, New York.
Akron, Ohio	703,479	Akron station (Amtrak)	Direct service gained in 1990 with the rerouting of the Broadway Limited, then lost in 2005 with the discontinuance of the Three Rivers. Service on the Capitol Limited 24 miles (39 km) to the southeast at Alliance, Ohio. Amtrak service is proposed under the American Jobs Plan.
Ogden, Utah	683,864	Ogden Union Station	Last direct inter-city service was the Pioneer in 1997. Currently directly served by the Utah Transit Authority's FrontRunner commuter rail. Amtrak service 30 miles (48 km) to the south in Salt Lake City, Utah.
Winston–Salem, North Carolina	676,008		Last service was by Southern Railway in 1970. Service 16 miles (26 km) to the Southeast in High Point, North Carolina.
Daytona Beach, Florida	668,365		Last had passenger service in 1968, when the Florida East Coast Railroad ended its operations. The last interstate trains were in 1963 when the East Coast Champion and City of Miami routes were moved inland from the Atlantic Coast. The Havana Special ended entirely that year. Amtrak trains stop at DeLand Station, 28 miles (45 km) to the west.
Madison, Wisconsin	664,865	Madison station (Milwaukee Road)	Last direct service was the Milwaukee Road's Varsity and Sioux in 1971. Service 28 miles (45 km) to the northeast in Columbus, Wisconsin. New direct service between Madison and Chicago via Milwaukee was planned but Wisconsin governor Scott Walker rejected federal funding for the project. Amtrak service is now proposed under the American Jobs Plan.
Wichita, Kansas	640,218	Wichita Union Station	Last direct service was the Lone Star in 1979. Service 25 miles (40 km) to the north at Newton, Kansas. New direct service being studied with extension of Heartland Flyer to Kansas City or Newton. The service is also supported under the American Jobs Plan.
Arlington/Westfield/Kennedale, Texas	475,385		Service 17 miles (27 km) to the west at Fort Worth Central Station.
Virginia Beach, Virginia	457,672		Service 5 miles (8.0 km) to the west at Norfolk station. Expansion of The Tide light rail into Virginia Beach is proposed, which would provide a local rail connection to Norfolk station.
York, Pennsylvania	449,058		Service 24 miles (39 km) to the east at Lancaster station.
Fort Wayne, Indiana	413,263	Fort Wayne station	Last direct service was in 1990, when the Broadway Limited rerouted through Nappanee, Indiana. Service 25 miles (40 km) to the north at Waterloo, Indiana.
Reading, Pennsylvania	421,164	Franklin Street station	Last direct service was regional service in 1981, carried by SEPTA. Service 27 miles (43 km) to the southwest at Lancaster, Pennsylvania, without a transit connection. Last interstate train was the Reading's Queen of the Valley in 1967. Amtrak service is proposed under the American Jobs Plan.
Canton, Ohio	397,520	Canton station	Last direct service was in 1990, when the Broadway Limited rerouted through Nappanee, Indiana. Service 23 miles (37 km) to the northeast in Alliance, Ohio.
Boulder, Colorado	326,196	Boulder station	Last direct service was the Burlington Route's Shoshone in 1967. Service 25 miles (40 km) to the southeast at Denver, Colorado. Service is proposed for the RTD B Line. Amtrak service is proposed under the American Jobs Plan.
Deptford – Glassboro – Mantua – Woodbury, New Jersey	291,636		Last inter-city service was regional ex-Pennsylvania-Reading Seashore Lines service run by the Penn Central in 1971. NJ Transit has proposed the Glassboro–Camden Line to Glassboro. Regional NJ Transit and PATCO service is available at Lindenwold, New Jersey 11 miles (18 km) to the east.
Hagerstown, Maryland	288,104	Hagerstown station	Service 23 miles (37 km) southwest in Martinsburg, West Virginia.
Chula Vista, California	274,942		Service 9 miles (14 km) to the northwest at San Diego, California.
Waco, Texas	273,920		Service 16 miles (26 km) to the southwest at McGregor, Texas.
St. Petersburg, Florida	258,308	St. Petersburg station	Trains stop across Tampa Bay in Tampa. Trains had previously crossed the bay into St. Petersburg. The city lost direct service across the bay when CSX lacked adequate funds to maintain the bridge across the bay. There is Amtrak Thruway bus service at 110th Avenue north of City Limits off US19 to Tampa Union Station (PSTA local bus route 34 passes near this location). Otherwise the only other method of transportation is taxi. The TECO Line Streetcar and HART buses both do not connect with the two areas, although express bus service exists between PSTA and HART.
Tyler, Texas	232,751		Last direct inter-city service was the St. Louis Southwestern Railway (Cotton Belt Route) service in 1956. Service 26 miles (42 km) away at Mineola, Texas.
Bay Minette – Daphne – Fairhope – Foley, Alabama	223,234		Last service was the Gulf Breeze in 1995. Amtrak service available in nearby Mobile, Alabama.
Fontana, California	214,547		Service 8 miles (13 km) away at San Bernardino.
Columbia, Missouri	208,173		Service 31 miles (50 km) south at Jefferson City, Missouri.
Huntington Beach, California	199,223		Service 15 miles (24 km) away at Santa Ana, California.
Elk Grove, California	174,775	Elk Grove station	Service 16 miles (26 km) northwest at Sacramento, California.
Beaver Falls, Pennsylvania	168,215		Last service was Penn Central's Manhattan Limited and the Pennsylvania Limited in 1971; 31 miles (50 km) to the southeast, has Amtrak service in Pittsburgh.
Coeur d'Alene, Idaho	165,697		Last service was by Great Northern Railway. However, Spokane, Washington, 34 miles (55 km) to the west, has Amtrak service in the Empire Builder.
State College, Pennsylvania	162,835		Service 30 miles (48 km) to the southeast in Lewistown, Pennsylvania. Trains last went to proximate Lemont in the late 1940s.
Denton/Corinth, Texas	162,503		Service 33 miles (53 km) north in Gainesville, Texas.
Kansas City, Kansas	156,607		Last direct service was a section of the Rock Island's Rocky Mountain Rocket in 1966. Amtrak's Southwest Chief and Missouri River Runner continue to stop at Kansas City, Missouri's Union Station.
Ottawa, Illinois	151,503		Last direct service was the Rock Island's Quad City Rocket and Peoria Rocket, both ending in 1978. Service 16 miles (26 km) to the north at Mendota, Illinois.
Bellevue, Washington	148,164		Service 10 miles (16 km) to the west at Seattle, Washington
Torrance, California	143,592		Service 20 miles (32 km) north in Los Angeles.
Lebanon, Pennsylvania	141,793		Service 25 miles (40 km) to the south at Lancaster, Pennsylvania.
Napa, California	138,019		Service 21 miles (34 km) to the east at Suisun, California.
Brandon-Mango-Seffner, Florida	135,687		Bypassed by Amtrak; service 12 miles (19 km) to the west in Tampa, Florida.
Kent, Washington	132,319		Service available 5 miles (8.0 km) north at Tukwila Station, 17 miles (27 km) southwest in Tacoma, Washington, and 18 miles (29 km) north in Seattle, Washington. All three stations are served by the Amtrak Cascades, Tacoma and Seattle are served by the Coast Starlight, and Seattle is served by the Empire Builder. Kent Station is served by Sound Transit's Sounder Commuter Rail to all three of these stations.
Visalia, California	129,529		Passenger service to the city ended in the 1950s or 1960s. However Amtrak's Gold Runner trains stop by at Hanford 21 miles (34 km) to the west.
Goldsboro, North Carolina	123,131		Last service 21 miles (34 km) to the west in Selma, North Carolina.
Vallejo, California	121,692		Service 13 miles (21 km) to the southeast at Martinez, California.
Santa Maria, California	107,263		Service 8 miles (13 km) to the west at Guadalupe, California.
Concord, North Carolina	105,240		Bypassed by Amtrak; Piedmont service 7 miles (11 km) to the north in Kannapolis, North Carolina.
Sparks, Nevada	105,006	Sparks station	Bypassed by Amtrak in 2009. Service 4 miles (6.4 km) to the east at Reno, Nevada.
Gadsden, Alabama	102,371		Service 29 miles (47 km) to the south in Anniston, Alabama.

== Cities with regional rail connections ==
The following cities are not directly served by inter-city rail service, but have regional or commuter rail service that connects to the inter-city rail network.

City	Population (2019 est.)	Regional rail station	Regional rail system	Inter-city connection	Notes
San Francisco, California	808,437	4th and King Street station	Caltrain	Santa Clara Transit Center	The closest inter-city rail connections by road or ferry are across San Francisco Bay at Oakland–Jack London Square, Emeryville, and Berkeley. Direct inter-city passenger service to the San Francisco Peninsula ended with the formation of Amtrak in 1971, when the Del Monte was discontinued and the Coast Daylight was rerouted to Oakland. Since the late 1990s, Amtrak has worked on plans to restore the Coast Daylight from San Francisco to Los Angeles, and is supported by the American Jobs Plan. California High-Speed Rail is also planned for this route. Additionally, proposals to add a San Francisco stop to the San Jose-Sacramento Capitol Corridor are being considered.
San Francisco, California	808,437	Embarcadero station	BART	Richmond station	
Antelope Valley (Lancaster – Palmdale, California)	541,726	Lancaster station	Metrolink	Glendale Transportation Center	Last service was the Southern Pacific's San Joaquin Daylight and Sacramento Daylight in 1971. California High-Speed Rail planned for 2033.
Santa Rosa, California	494,336	Santa Rosa Downtown station	Sonoma–Marin Area Rail Transit (SMART)	Richmond station	SMART does not directly connect to the inter-city rail system. There is a Golden Gate Transit bus connection between San Rafael Transit Center and Richmond station. From Larkspur Landing, near Larkspur station, the Golden Gate Ferry operates to the San Francisco Ferry Building adjacent to the Embarcadero BART station.
Long Beach, California	462,628	Downtown Long Beach station	Los Angeles Metro Rail	Los Angeles Union Station	Los Angeles Union Station is 23 miles (37 km) to the north. The light rail A line serves as a direct route between Los Angeles and Long Beach.
Minneapolis, Minnesota	429,954	Target Field station	Metro	Saint Paul Union Depot	Lost direct service in 1978 when Amtrak shifted intercity service to St. Paul, Minnesota. Gained commuter service in 2009. New direct service is proposed through an extension of the Borealis, which will initially provide service between Chicago and St. Paul.
Tri-Valley, California	361,000	Pleasanton station	Altamont Corridor Express	Fremont station	Additional connection by road at Hayward station.
Jersey City, New Jersey	292,449	Journal Square Transportation Center	PATH	Newark Penn Station	
Waterbury, Connecticut	287,768	Waterbury station	Metro-North Railroad's Waterbury Branch	Bridgeport station	Last inter-city service was an unnamed New Haven service in 1958. Closest inter-city station by road is Meriden Transit Center, 18 miles (29 km) to the east.
Atlantic City, New Jersey	263,670	Atlantic City Rail Terminal	NJ Transit's Atlantic City Line	30th Street Station	Last inter-city service was the Atlantic City Express in 1995.
Irving, Texas	256,732	Downtown Irving/Heritage Crossing	Trinity Railway Express	Fort Worth Central Station; Dallas Union Station	
Moreno Valley, California	213,055	Moreno Valley/March Field station	Metrolink	Riverside–Downtown station	
Paterson, New Jersey	159,732	Paterson station	NJ Transit's Main Line	Newark Penn Station or New York Penn Station	Transfer at Secaucus Junction is required to reach an inter-city station.
Escondido, California	151,625	Escondido Transit Center	SPRINTER	Oceanside Transit Center	Oceanside is 21 miles (34 km) to the west.
Santa Fe, New Mexico	150,358	Santa Fe Depot	New Mexico Rail Runner Express	Alvarado Transportation Center	Closest inter-city station by road is 14 miles (23 km) to the southeast at Lamy station.
Concord, California	129,295	Concord station	BART	Richmond station	BART connection requires one transfer. The closest inter-city station by road is 9 miles (14 km) to the northwest at Martinez station.
Lowell, Massachusetts	110,997	Lowell station	MBTA Commuter Rail	Woburn–Anderson station	Last inter-city service was the Boston and Maine's State of Maine in 1960.
San Mateo, California	105,661	San Mateo station	Caltrain	Santa Clara Transit Center	Closest inter-city station by road is Hayward station to the northeast.
Brockton, Massachusetts	105,643	Brockton station	MBTA Commuter Rail	South Station, Boston	South Station is 20 miles (32 km) to the north.
Daly City, California	104,901	Daly City station	BART	Richmond station	Bypassed after completion of the Bayshore Cutoff in 1907. BART tracks were eventually laid in the former rail right of way, but the city has never been reconnected to the national network.
Norwalk, California	103,949	Norwalk/Santa Fe Springs station	Metrolink	Fullerton Transportation Center	Fullerton is 12 miles (19 km) to the east.
New Bedford, Massachusetts	102,882	New Bedford station	MBTA Commuter Rail	South Station	South Station, Boston is 56 miles (90 km) to the north. Providence, RI station is 32 miles (51 km) to the west.
Lynn, Massachusetts	101,253	Lynn station	MBTA Commuter Rail	North Station	North Station, Boston is 11.6 miles (18.7 km) to the southwest.

== Other gaps ==
Amtrak provides no service to Mexico. From 1973 to 1981 Amtrak operated the Inter-American, which allowed for transfers between Laredo, Texas and Nuevo Laredo, Tamaulipas for connecting service with the Ferrocarriles Nacionales de México. The closest Amtrak service to Mexico may be found at stations along the western portion of the Sunset Limited and southwestern portion of the Texas Eagle in Texas, New Mexico, Arizona, and California; as well as the Pacific Surfliner service to Union Station in San Diego.

Amtrak has studied rail lines formerly canceled that could renew service to some cities. Cities involved include Boise, Mobile, Tallahassee, the Quad Cities (four adjoining cities in northwest Illinois and southeastern Iowa), Billings, and Wichita. Proposals for high-speed rail could also restore service for several cities. Other services Amtrak could restore include the Pioneer (serving Chicago-Denver-Seattle via the California Zephyr), the Black Hawk (Chicago-Dubuque, eastern Iowa), the North Coast Hiawatha (serving Chicago-Fargo-Seattle via the Montana Rail Link), the Montrealer (Extension of the Vermonter from St. Albans, VT to Montreal, QC), the Coast Daylight (supplementing the Coast Starlight between Los Angeles and the Bay Area), and the New Orleans-Orlando segment of the Sunset Limited.

== See also ==
- List of Amtrak routes
- List of Amtrak stations
- List of busiest Amtrak stations
