= Ithaca station (Lehigh Valley Railroad) =

- Lehigh Valley Railroad Station
- U.S. National Register of Historic Places
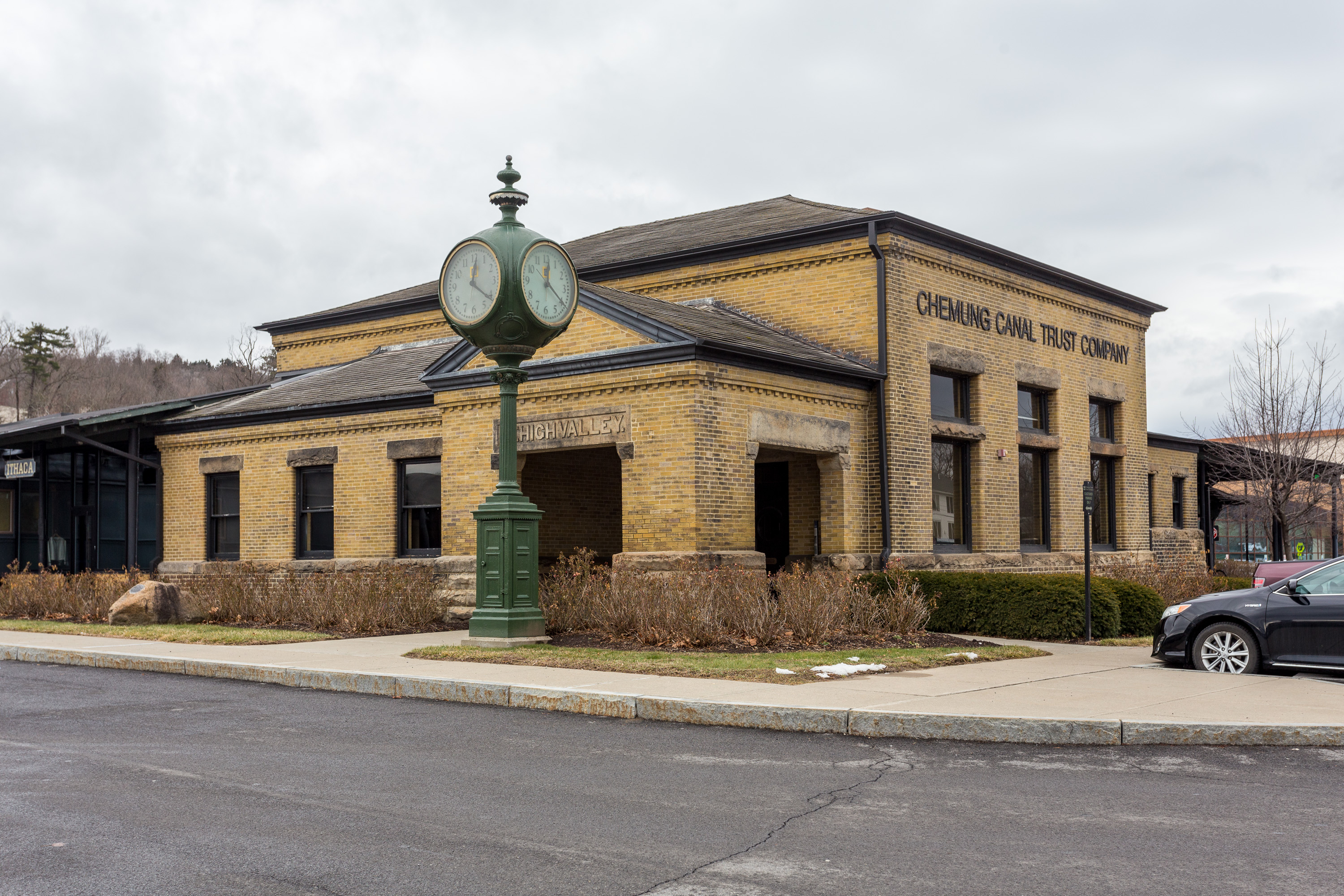

- Location within New York Location within the United States
- Location: W. Buffalo St. and Taughannock Blvd., Ithaca, New York, U.S.
- Coordinates: 42°26′29.1″N 76°30′46.9″W
- Area: 2 acres (0.81 ha)
- Built: 1898
- Architect: A. B. Wood
- Architectural style: Classical Revival, Romanesque
- NRHP reference No.: 74001311
- Added to NRHP: December 31, 1974

Lehigh Valley Railroad Station is a historic railway station located at 806 West Buffalo Street, Ithaca in Tompkins County, New York.

The Passenger Station and Freight Station were designed by local architect A. B. Wood and built in 1898 by the Lehigh Valley Railroad. The Passenger Station is a Classical Revival structure with a Romanesque feeling. It is a massive square building with extensions and sheltering roofs for baggage operations. At one corner is the entrance marquee and a four sided street clock mounted in a Corinthian column. The main waiting room section has a hipped roof and features a pedimented porte cochere. The Freight Station is a long, gray painted frame building with a two-story clapboarded section and a long freight storage part. Lehigh Valley passenger trains making stops there included the Black Diamond, Maple Leaf and Star.

Station with train and passengers in the 1910s

It was used as a passenger station until February 4, 1961. In 1966, local resident Joseph O. Ciaschi, an early local leader in the historic preservation movement, converted the abandoned building into a restaurant. Known as The Station, the restaurant operated until September, 2005, when it was closed and the building was converted for use as a branch office of the Chemung Canal Trust Company: an Elmira-based bank. The branch office closed in November of 2024; the building is vacant as of June, 2026.

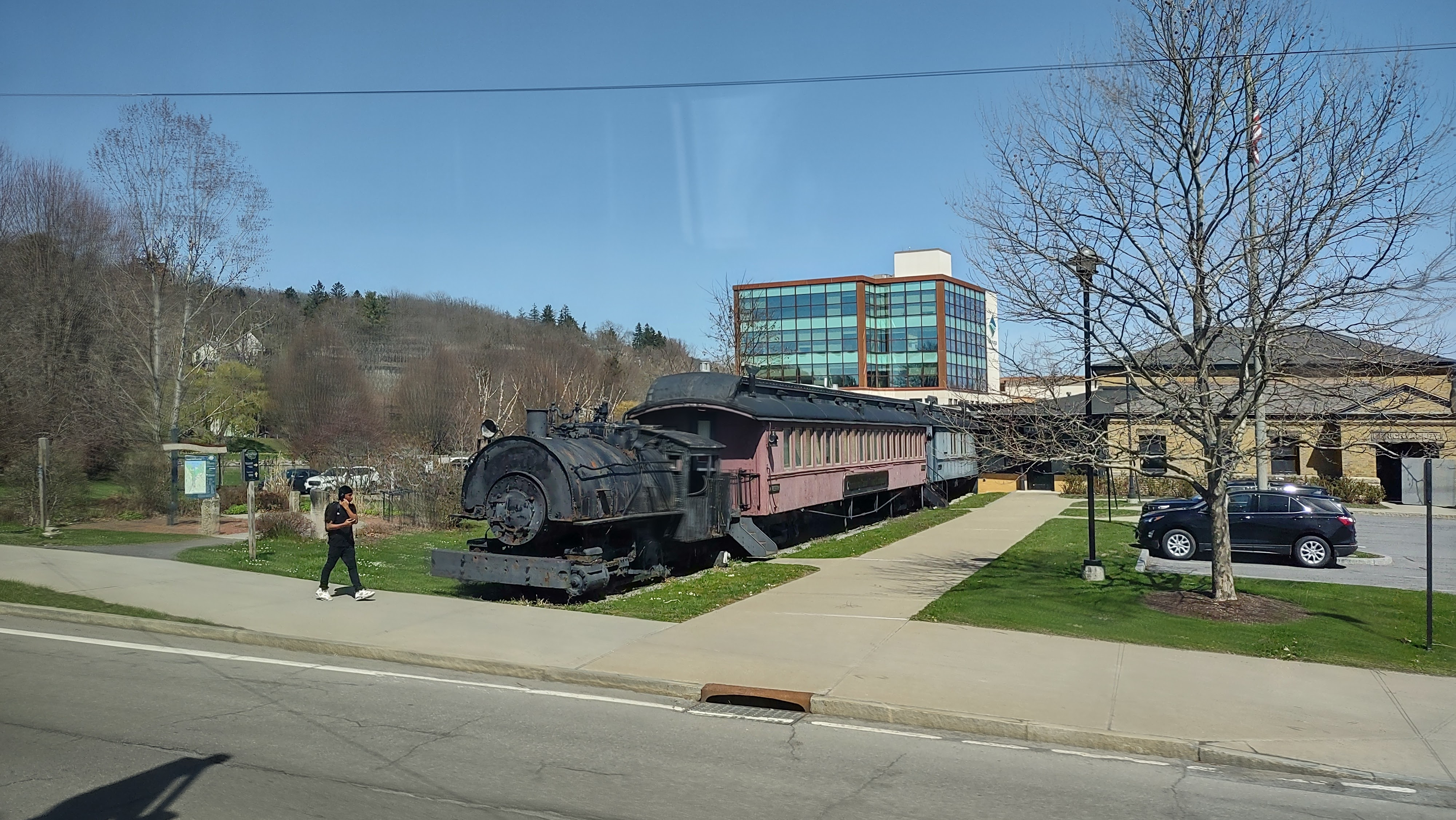
With train, 2024

The building was listed on the National Register of Historic Places in 1974.

Preceding station	Lehigh Valley Railroad	Following station
Former lines
Willow Creek toward Geneva	Ithaca Branch	Newfield toward Van Etten
Terminus	Auburn and Ithaca Branch	McKinneys toward Auburn
