= John Wilkes (train) =

Passenger train of the Lehigh Valley Railroad

Overview
- Service type: Inter-city rail
- Status: discontinued
- Locale: Northeastern United States
- First service: June 4, 1939
- Last service: February 3, 1961
- Former operators: Lehigh Valley Railroad; Reading Railroad

Route
- Termini: New York, New York; Pittston, Pennsylvania
- Distance travelled: 186.4 miles
- Average journey time: 4 hours, 47 minutes (eastbound); 4 hours, 57 minutes (westbound)
- Service frequency: Daily
- Train numbers: 28 (eastbound), 29 (westbound)

On-board services
- Seating arrangements: coach
- Catering facilities: dining car
- Observation facilities: parlor car

Technical
- Track gauge: 4 ft 8 1/2 in (1,435 mm) standard gauge

The John Wilkes was a passenger train of the Lehigh Valley Railroad (LV). It ran from New York City to the Coxton section of Pittston, Pennsylvania, from 1939 until the end of Lehigh Valley Passenger Service in 1961. This train was the last Lehigh Valley Passenger Service operated, along with the Maple Leaf.

== History ==
The Lehigh Valley introduced the John Wilkes on June 4, 1939, as a streamlined train running from Pittston to New York City, New York's Pennsylvania Station taking train numbers 28 eastbound and 29 westbound. The train consisted of a Otto Kuhler designed streamlined shrouding for the K-5 4-6-2 "Pacific" locomotives built in 1916, which were 25 years old at the time along with nine passenger cars being all air-conditioned with fluorescent lighting. The train was named after John Wilkes, a member of the British Parliament that supported the American Patriots during the American Revolution and one of two people named after the city of Wilkes-Barre, a stop on the train itself.

Despite being overshadowed by competing railroads such as the Delaware, Lackawanna and Western Railroad, the LVRR still gained fame when the train was inaugurated just in time for the New York Worlds Fair. The Reading Railroad also offered a connection service from the Reading Terminal in Philadelphia to Bethlehem, Pennsylvania's Union Station.

Trains running out of New York Pennsylvania Station were handled by Pennsylvania Railroad electric locomotives until Manhattan Transfer station and later in 1935, Newark Penn Station. Steam locomotives and later Diesel locomotives would take over from Newark for the rest of the trip, mainly being Lehigh Valley Railroad Power. The same operation happened vice-versa. Train cars were normally swapped out and move in during the trip from New York to Pittston and back, but the train did not change significantly, despite the ALCO PAs replacing the 4-6-2's in 1948. The northern terminus was at Coxton station in Pittston, 2.4 miles north of the downtown Pittston station. This was in distinct contrast with the other longer distance trains that continued further north, stopping in Pittston, but not at Coxton station.

Major changes came in 1959, when the western terminus was cut back to Lehighton as the Lehigh Valley Railroad was suffering a $4 Million loss on running passenger trains due to decreasing ridership. Other major cutbacks included the discontinuance of the Black Diamond and the Asa Packer.

The final blow came on February 3, 1961, when the LV ended all passenger service and ran the final runs of the John Wilkes along with the Maple Leaf, the only other operating Lehigh Valley passenger train. Today most of the route is still intact, being used as the Lehigh Line but with only freight trains operating on the route with no passenger service.
