= Nashville–Atlanta passenger rail =

Proposed train service in Tennessee and Georgia

Overview
- Service type: Inter-city rail
- Status: Proposed
- Locale: Tennessee, Alabama, Georgia
- Current operator: Amtrak

Route
- Termini: Nashville; Atlanta
- Distance travelled: 280 mi (450 km)
- Average journey time: 6 hours 34 minutes
- Service frequency: 2 daily round trips

Technical
- Track gauge: 4 ft 8 1/2 in (1,435 mm) standard gauge

Inter-city passenger train service operated by Amtrak has been proposed between Nashville, Tennessee, and Atlanta, Georgia, via Chattanooga, Tennessee. As of December 2023, the project is moving forward and has received federal funding for engineering and feasibility studies.

== History ==
=== Background ===
The last passenger train to serve Nashville was the long-distance Floridian, discontinued in 1979. Today, Nashville is the third largest metropolitan area in the United States lacking inter-city rail service, though it sees commuter rail in the form of the WeGo Star. Since 1975, Atlanta has been served only by the long-distance Crescent.

=== Proposal ===
In January 2020, Amtrak representatives met with Tennessee state legislators to discuss the possibility of the Nashville–Atlanta route. In spring 2021, Amtrak included the route in its 15-year "Amtrak Connects US" expansion vision. The proposal calls for two round trips per day with a one-way trip time of 3 hours 6 minutes from Atlanta to Chattanooga, and 6 hours 34 minutes from Atlanta to Nashville. Intermediate stops on the 280 mi (450 km) route are listed, in southbound order, as Nashville International Airport, Murfreesboro, Tullahoma, Bridgeport, Chattanooga, Chattanooga Metropolitan Airport, Dalton, Cartersville, and Marietta.

In March 2023, the City of Chattanooga submitted the Nashville–Atlanta project to the Federal Railroad Administration's Corridor Identification and Development Program. The program provides money for engineering and feasibility studies and prioritizes routes for future federal funding. The corridor was accepted into the program in December 2023 and was granted $500,000 in development funds.

== Route ==
As proposed, the train would operate over existing freight rail lines owned by CSX Transportation:

- Nashville Terminal Subdivision within Nashville
- Chattanooga Subdivision from Nashville to Chattanooga
- W&A Subdivision from Chattanooga to Marietta
- Atlanta Terminal Subdivision from Marietta to Downtown Atlanta
