= Maple Leaf (LV train) =

Overview
- Service type: Inter-city rail
- Status: Discontinued
- Locale: Northeastern United States/Ontario
- Predecessor: Toronto
- First service: 1937
- Last service: February 3, 1961
- Former operator(s): Lehigh Valley Railroad; Canadian National Railway; Reading Railroad

Route
- Termini: New York City and Philadelphia; Toronto
- Distance travelled: 548 miles (882 km) (New York City-Toronto)
- Average journey time: 13 hours, 50 minutes, northbound 13 hours, 25 minutes, southbound (1953)
- Service frequency: Daily
- Train number(s): Northbound: 7 Southbound: 8

On-board services
- Seating arrangements: Coach
- Sleeping arrangements: Open-sections, double bedrooms and drawing room
- Catering facilities: Dining car (New York City-Lehighton, Pennsylvania)
- Observation facilities: Cafe-lounge (New York City-Lehighton); cafe-parlor car (Niagara Falls, ON-Toronto)

Technical
- Track gauge: 4 ft 8 1/2 in (1,435 mm)

The Maple Leaf was an international night train between New York City and Toronto, operated by the Lehigh Valley Railroad in coordination with the Canadian National Railway. It ran from Penn Station in New York City and concluded at Toronto's Union Station. The train's service began in 1937; a predecessor Lehigh Valley Railroad train, the Toronto, traveled the same route. The Maple Leaf and the John Wilkes were the last named passenger trains operated by the Lehigh Valley Railroad.

The route was double tracked from New York City to Niagara Falls and the Finger Lakes Region. In contrast to the Lehigh Valley Railroad's Black Diamond and Star, it bypassed Ithaca on the northbound trip. However, in the final years of the Maple Leaf, after the discontinuance of those trains, it did stop in Ithaca. The train had an alternate section operated with the Reading Railroad, which originated at Reading Terminal in Philadelphia and linked with the main part of the Maple Leaf train in Bethlehem.

The train had its final departure on February 3, 1961.

In 1981, Amtrak and Via Rail reintroduced the Maple Leaf name for their New York–Toronto train, the first direct rail service between these cities since 1967. The modern Maple Leaf uses the Empire Corridor through New York state rather than the historic route of the Lehigh Valley train, neither entering New Jersey nor Pennsylvania.
