= Buffalo Day Express =

Railroad from New York to Washington, D.C.

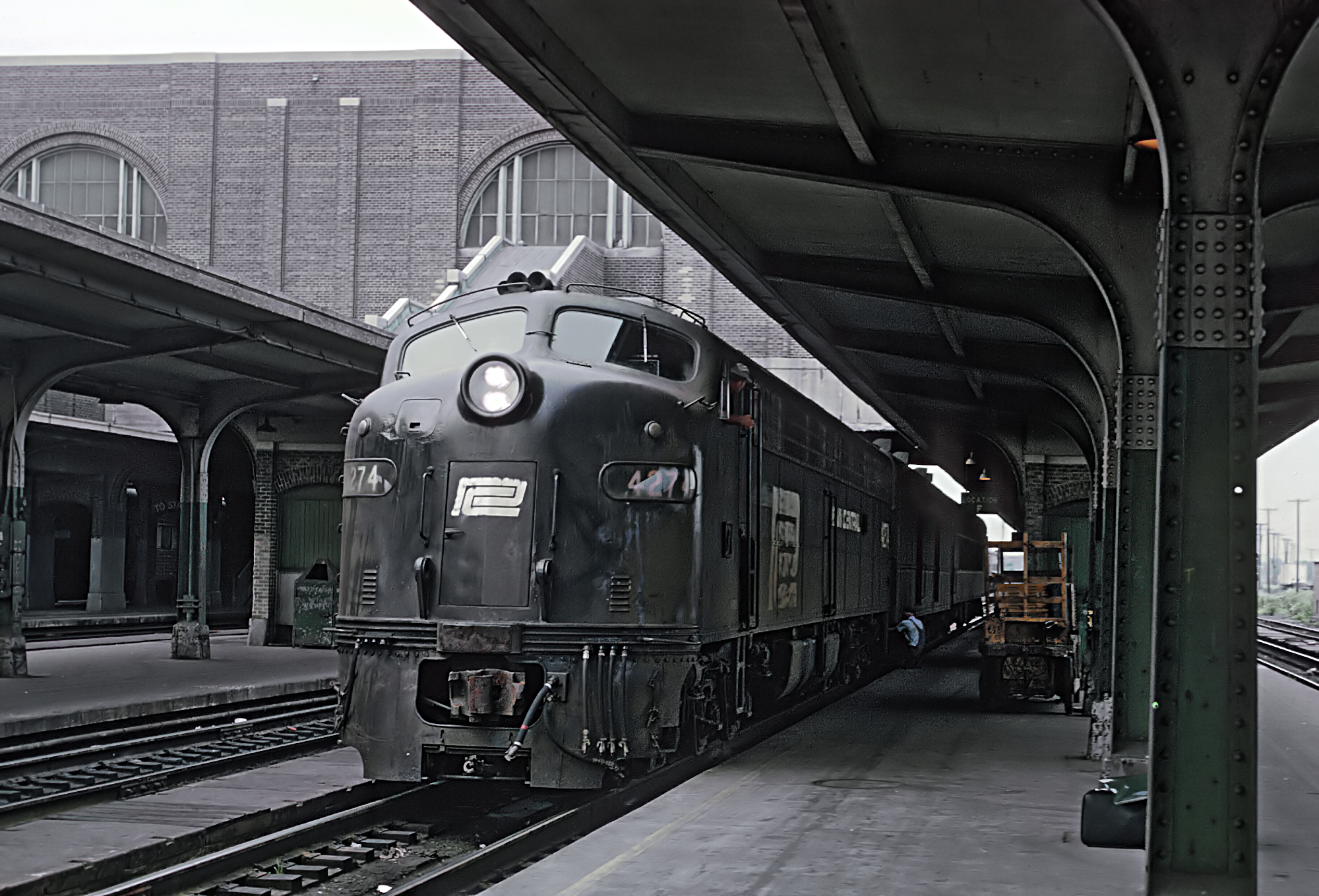
- Buffalo Day Express at Buffalo Central Terminal

Overview
- Service type: Inter-city rail
- Status: discontinued
- Locale: Northeastern United States/Mid-Atlantic States
- First service: 1900
- Last service: 1968
- Former operator: Pennsylvania Railroad (PRR)

Route
- Termini: Washington, D.C. and Philadelphia, Pennsylvania; Buffalo, New York
- Distance travelled: 435.4 miles (700.7 km)
- Service frequency: Daily
- Train numbers: 571 (northbound), 570 (southbound)

On-board services
- Seating arrangements: coach
- Catering facilities: dining car, cafe coach
- Observation facilities: parlor car

The Buffalo Day Express was a long-distance north–south Pennsylvania Railroad passenger train from Washington, D.C., to Buffalo, New York. It had a second branch that originated in Philadelphia, Pennsylvania, and at times, from New York, New York. In the southbound direction, the train ran by the name, Washington Express. It was the longest running of trains on the Washington-Buffalo route, north through central Pennsylvania on the Buffalo Line, operating from 1900 to the latter years of the 1960s, with a shortened segment until 1971.

== Route and equipment ==
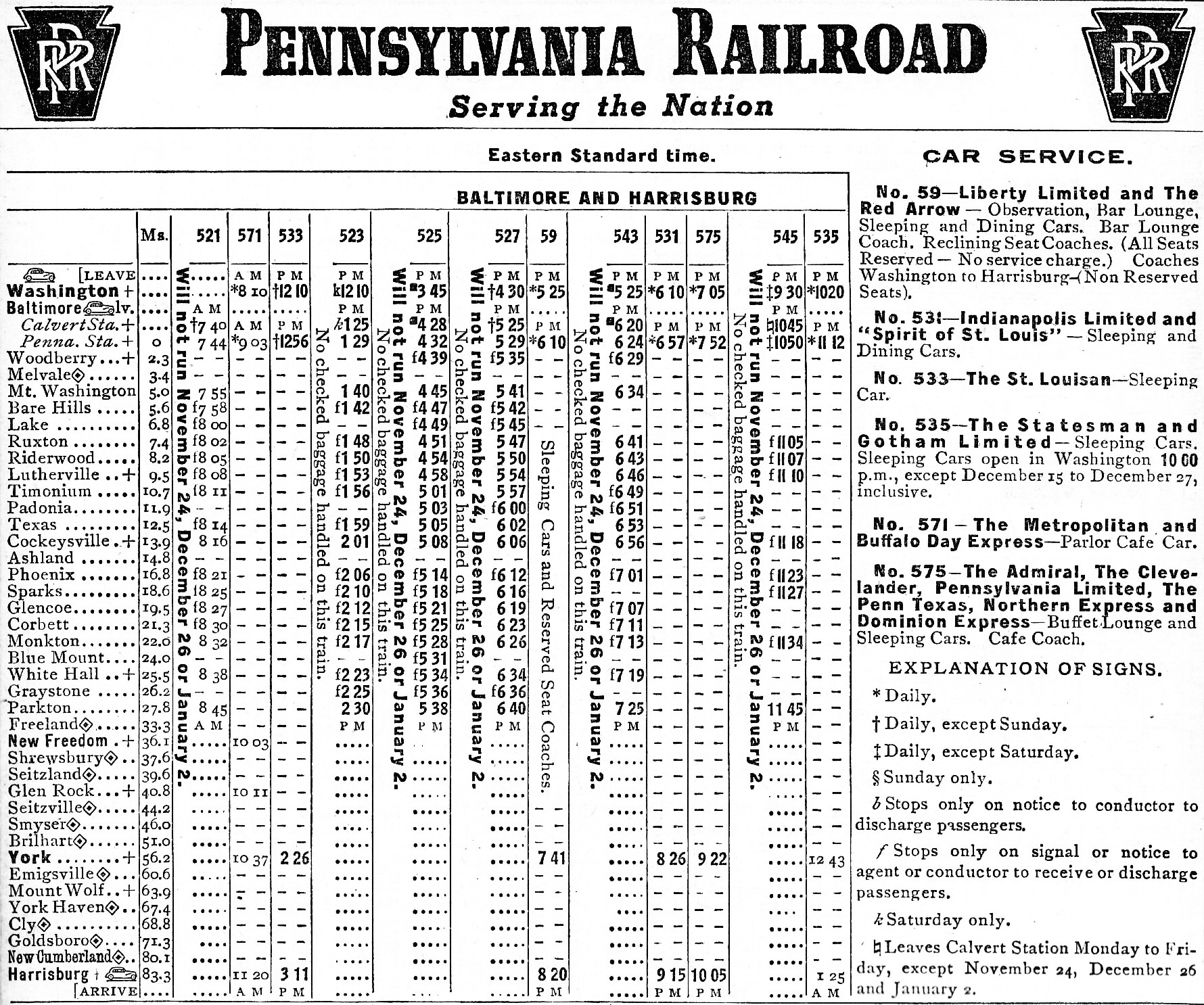
Pennsylvania Railroad 1955 Washington - Harrisburg schedule Buffalo Day Express (#571) and Dominion Express (#575)

From Washington, the train's route went northeast to Baltimore on the Pennsy's electrified Washington–New York mainline. At Baltimore, the train diverged to the PRR's Northern Central Railway subsidiary line north to York and Harrisburg, Pennsylvania. Because of the way the tracks were aligned at Baltimore Penn Station, it was necessary for the train's cars to face rearward for the short 40-mile (64 km) journey between Washington and Baltimore, where a steam locomotive (and later diesel) would be coupled to what now became the train's front end. Arriving in Harrisburg, it picked up equipment from Philadelphia's 30th Street Station. From there it continued north to Williamsport, from where it shifted northwest to Emporium, Pennsylvania; from which it headed north to Olean, New York, and then to Buffalo, New York.

In the early 1940s it carried coaches from Washington to Buffalo and from Philadelphia to Buffalo. Both branches also carried parlor cars. From Washington to Harrisburg it had cafe coaches; and from Philadelphia to Harrisburg it had a dining car, and from Harrisburg to Buffalo it had a separate dining car. In the early the 1950s, the Philadelphia service was extended to New York City. However, by 1957, the eastern trains only originated in Philadelphia, and they ended in Harrisburg. Passengers would transfer trains to continue to Buffalo. Throughout its lifetime, the train's consist included considerable head end equipment carrying mail and express.

== Nighttime counterpart ==
The Pennsylvania railroad also operated the Dominion Express over these Washington-Buffalo and Philadelphia-Buffalo sections. The Dominion Express, for both north and south directions had coach, cafe coach and sleeper equipment. Even in the 1950s period of origin from Philadelphia to New York, the southbound Dominion Express ended in Philadelphia, not New York. Northbound, the Dominion Express afforded connection at Williamsport with a local PRR train to Elmira, New York and then Rochester, New York. Southbound, the train from Rochester would meet up with the Southern Express at Williamsport.

In February, 1958 the Dominion Express ended, and the overnight service was picked up by the Washington, D.C.–Erie, Pennsylvania Northern Express, #575 (Southern Express, #574, when heading south-bound). The Erie and Buffalo originating branches of that train would converge at Emporium, Pennsylvania, and continue south to Washington. A supplemental set of through sleepers operated from Buffalo to New York and back. By this time, the train's sleeper equipment eliminated open-sections and consisted only of roomettes and other private rooms.

== Demise ==
From 1958 to 1968 the southbound version of the train, #570, was called the Baltimore Day Express. Excepting on Sundays, passengers bound east of Harrisburg would need to transfer at Harrisburg.

The Buffalo Day Express as a named train ended upon the 1968 merger of the Pennsylvania Railroad with the New York Central Railroad into the Penn Central Railroad. The Penn Central ran the train as a multi-segment overnight train. The train ran as #575, departing at 11:35 pm from Harrisburg to Buffalo. It picked up passengers from #3 (the Penn Texas) from New York to Harrisburg. There was no Washington-originating train synchronized to meet the train in the Penn Central years. This train also dropped sleeper car service.

When Amtrak began on May 1, 1971, it dropped the line altogether, ending decades of service between Harrisburg and Buffalo, leaving medium-sized cities such as Williamsport outside of the national passenger train network.

== See also ==
- Northern Central Railway
