= Rogue River (train) =

Former train service in Oregon

The Rogue River was a passenger train which ran between Portland, Oregon and Ashland operated by Southern Pacific.

Passenger service through Ashland began in 1887 with the completion of Southern Pacific's Siskiyou line. When the Natron Cutoff was completed in 1926, local service over the Siskiyou Pass was maintained with a train operating between Portland and Ashland. As Southern Pacific would go on to route most traffic over the new shorter cutoff, the local would remain as one of a few trains providing passenger service along the old route. By the 1930s, the service had been named the Oregonian, with the northbound train connected to the West Coast at Eugene. The trip was rechristened as the Rogue River by July 1938. Southern Pacific announced the service would end in July 1955, though the Oregon Public Utilities Commission ordered that this be delayed pending public hearings. Despite this, the final Rogue River runs occurred on August 6.
