= Build Back Better Plan =

Legislative framework proposed by Joe Biden

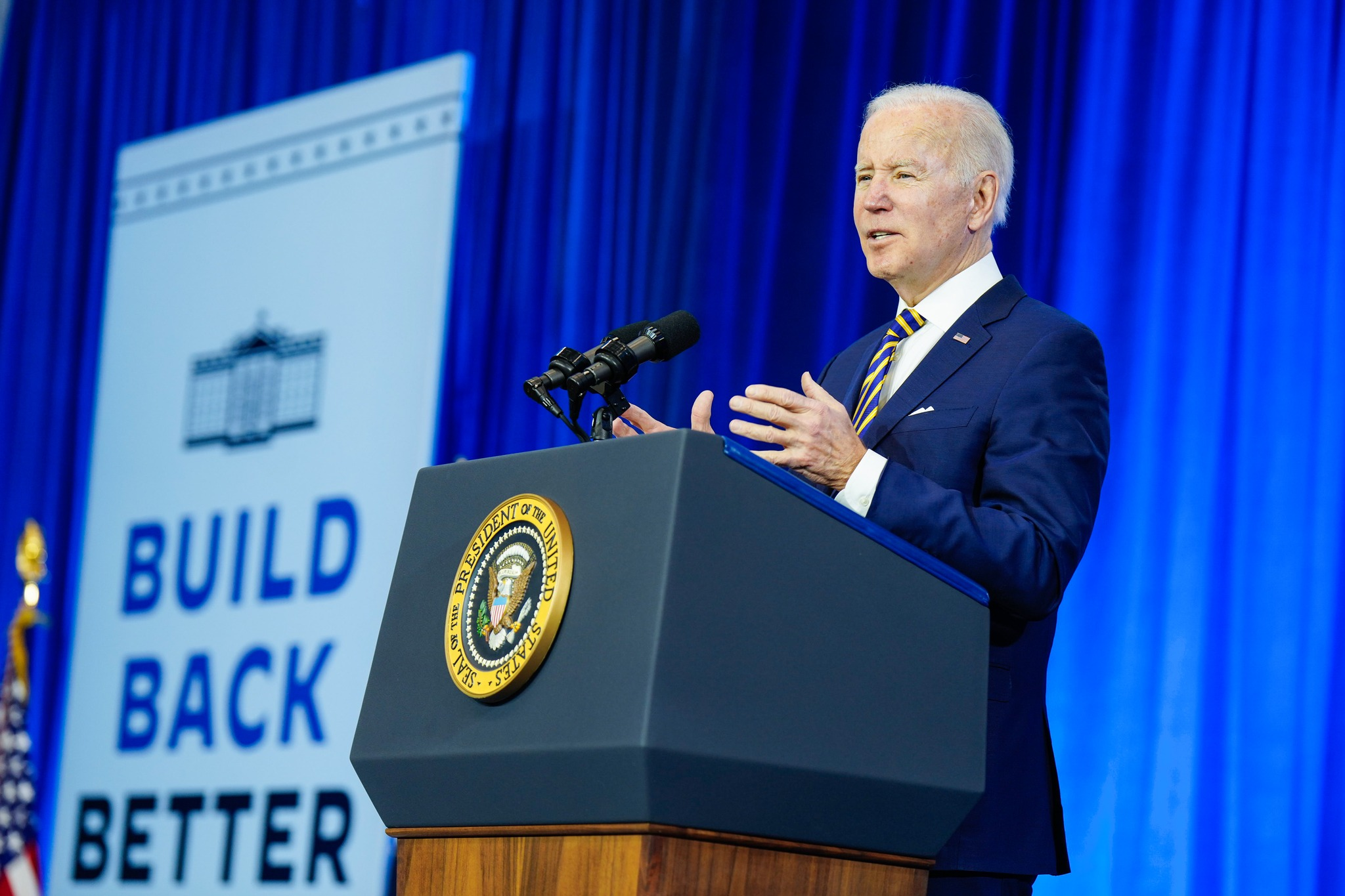
President Biden promotes his Build Back Better Plan at Germanna Community College, Virginia, on February 10, 2022.

The Build Back Better Plan or Build Back Better Agenda was a legislative framework proposed by United States president Joe Biden between 2020 and 2021. Generally viewed as ambitious in size and scope, it sought the largest nationwide public investment in social, infrastructural, and environmental programs since the 1930s Great Depression-era policies of the New Deal.

The Build Back Better plan was divided into three parts:

1. American Rescue Plan (ARP), a COVID-19 pandemic-relief bill;
2. American Jobs Plan (AJP), a proposal to address long-neglected infrastructure needs and reduce America's contributions to destructive effects of climate change;
3. American Families Plan (AFP), a proposal to fund a variety of social policy initiatives, some of which (e.g., paid parental leave) had never before been enacted nationally in the U.S.

The first part was passed as the $1.9 trillion American Rescue Plan Act of 2021, and was signed into law in March 2021. The other two parts were reworked into different bills over the course of extensive negotiations. Aspects of the AJP's infrastructure goals were diverted into the Infrastructure Investment and Jobs Act, which was signed into law in November 2021.

Other AJP priorities (e.g., climate change remediation, home health care reform, etc.) were then merged with the AFP to form the Build Back Better Act. The bill passed the Democratic-controlled House of Representatives but struggled to gain the support of Democrats Joe Manchin of West Virginia and Kyrsten Sinema of Arizona in the evenly divided Senate, with unified Republican opposition. Manchin and Sinema negotiated the reduction of the Build Back Better Act's size, scope, and cost significantly with Biden and Democratic congressional leaders, but Manchin, widely viewed as the key swing vote needed to pass the bill in the Senate, ultimately rejected it, citing unresolved disputes about the short- and long-term costs of the legislative package.

Continued negotiations between Manchin and Senate majority leader Chuck Schumer eventually resulted in the Inflation Reduction Act of 2022, which was signed into law in August 2022, and incorporated some of the Build Back Better Act's climate change, healthcare, and tax reform proposals while excluding its social safety net proposals.

== General history of the term and plan ==
The term first appeared and was used in the report "Rebuilding a Better Aceh and Nias: Preliminary Stocktaking of the Reconstruction Effort Six Months After the Earthquake and Tsunami" published by the World Bank in May 2005, and prepared in collaboration with the Bureau of Reconstruction and Rehabilitation for Aceh and Nias (BRR) and the international donor community. The initial preliminary report was revised and published in October 2005. Special United Nations Tsunami Envoy, President Bill Clinton, who visited Aceh during June 2005, was briefed by The World Bank, BRR and donors and included the term in his brief to the United Nations Economic and Social Council in July 2005. Clinton also released a special report in December 2006 entitled "Lessons Learned from Tsunami Recovery:Key Propositions for Building Back Better".

The term was subsequently used as a conceptual term by various leaders, at the backdrop of other natural disasters. Following this, the term was used more specifically in a report by the World Economic Forum on natural disasters on the 28th of April, 2011. In was mentioned again in a comprehensive report by the WEF in October 2015, and once more in WEF articles from 2016 and 2019. An overarching plan called 'Build Back Better', with outlines similar to Biden's eventual plan, was first published by the World Economic Forum in April 2020, and then again several times throughout May and July of the same year. The plan involved major social, economic and political reforms, at the backdrop of the Pandemic. The wording 'Build Back Better' and an associated plan, first appeared in American politics during Biden's presidential campaign, in July 2020. After having been introduced by President Biden, the term 'Build Back Better' became synonymous with his presidency's agendas.

In the years which followed Biden's introduction of his plan, other politicians across the world have also come to adopt various aspects of it, or call for its implementation. Some countries, such as Japan, have used the term to signify a 'disaster preparedness and resilience plan'. In 2023, Israeli politician Tamar Zandberg proposed that Israel should work by the environment and medical outlines of the plan.

== Historical background of Biden's plan ==
The COVID-19 pandemic caused substantial job losses in the U.S., with a May 2020 estimate finding that it had resulted in the greatest unemployment crisis since the Great Depression. During his presidency, Donald Trump floated using low interest rates to spend on infrastructure, including roads, bridges, and tunnels, but specifically excluding the initiatives of the Green New Deal supported by some of the members in the Democratic Party.

== Vision ==
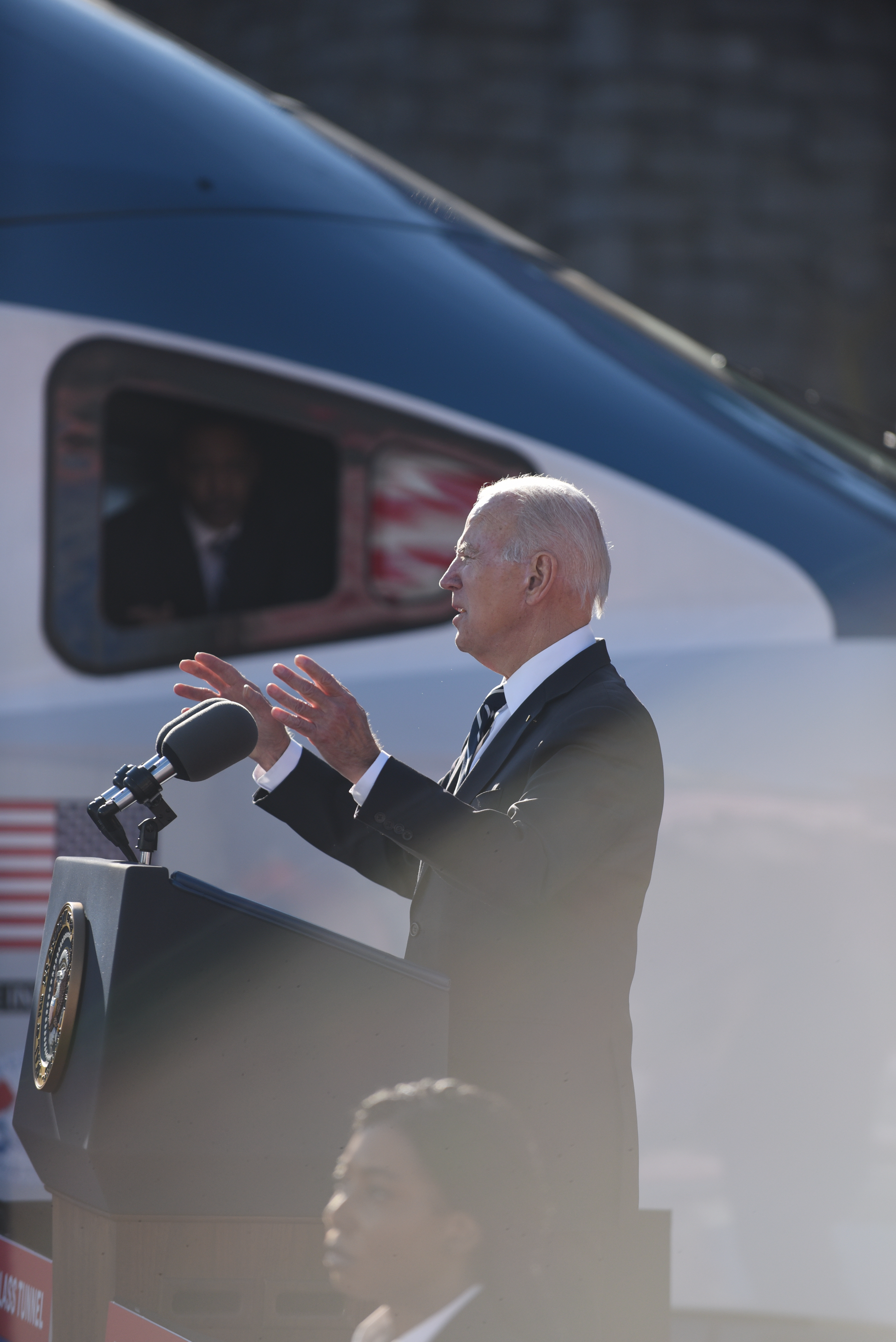
President Joe Biden during his visit to the B&P Tunnel in January 2023. An Avelia Liberty high-speed train is in the background.

Shortly before his inauguration as the 46th president of the United States, Biden laid out the following goals for his "Build Back Better" agenda:

1. "Build a Modern Infrastructure": The United States has consistently under-invested in the development of workers and millions of positions in rising industries, such as construction and healthcare, have not been fulfilled. President Biden's Build Back Better Plan would invest in training initiatives to help the millions of American workers to create high-quality employment in expanding fields through high-quality career and technical education paths and registered apprenticeships.
2. "Position the U.S. Auto Industry to Win the 21st Century with technology invented in America"
3. "Achieve a Carbon Pollution-Free Power Sector by 2035"
4. "Make Dramatic Investments in Energy Efficiency in Buildings, including Completing 4 Million Retrofits and Building 1.5 Million New Affordable Homes": Schools were faced with an estimated shortage of 100,000 teachers before the pandemic, which undermined the education of children. President Biden's Build Back Better Plan will address the lack of teachers and enhance the education of teachers, including providing teacher residencies and by developing programs that provide greater results and generate more POC teachers. During the course of the school year, it would extend free school food to another 9.3 million students and assist families buy food in the summer. The plan includes investing in modernizing school infrastructure to ensure school buildings are up to date, energy efficient, robust, and have technology and laboratory equipment to educate children for the future.
5. "Pursue a Historic Investment in Clean Energy Innovation"
6. "Advance Sustainable Agriculture and Conservation"
7. "Secure Environmental Justice and Equitable Economy Opportunity"

== American Rescue Plan ==
The first part of the plan resulted in a $1.9 trillion COVID-19 relief package, known as the American Rescue Plan Act of 2021. It was signed into law on March 11 using the procedure of reconciliation, allowing it to go into effect with unanimous Democratic support in the Senate and no Republican votes.

== American Jobs Plan ==
=== Original proposal ===
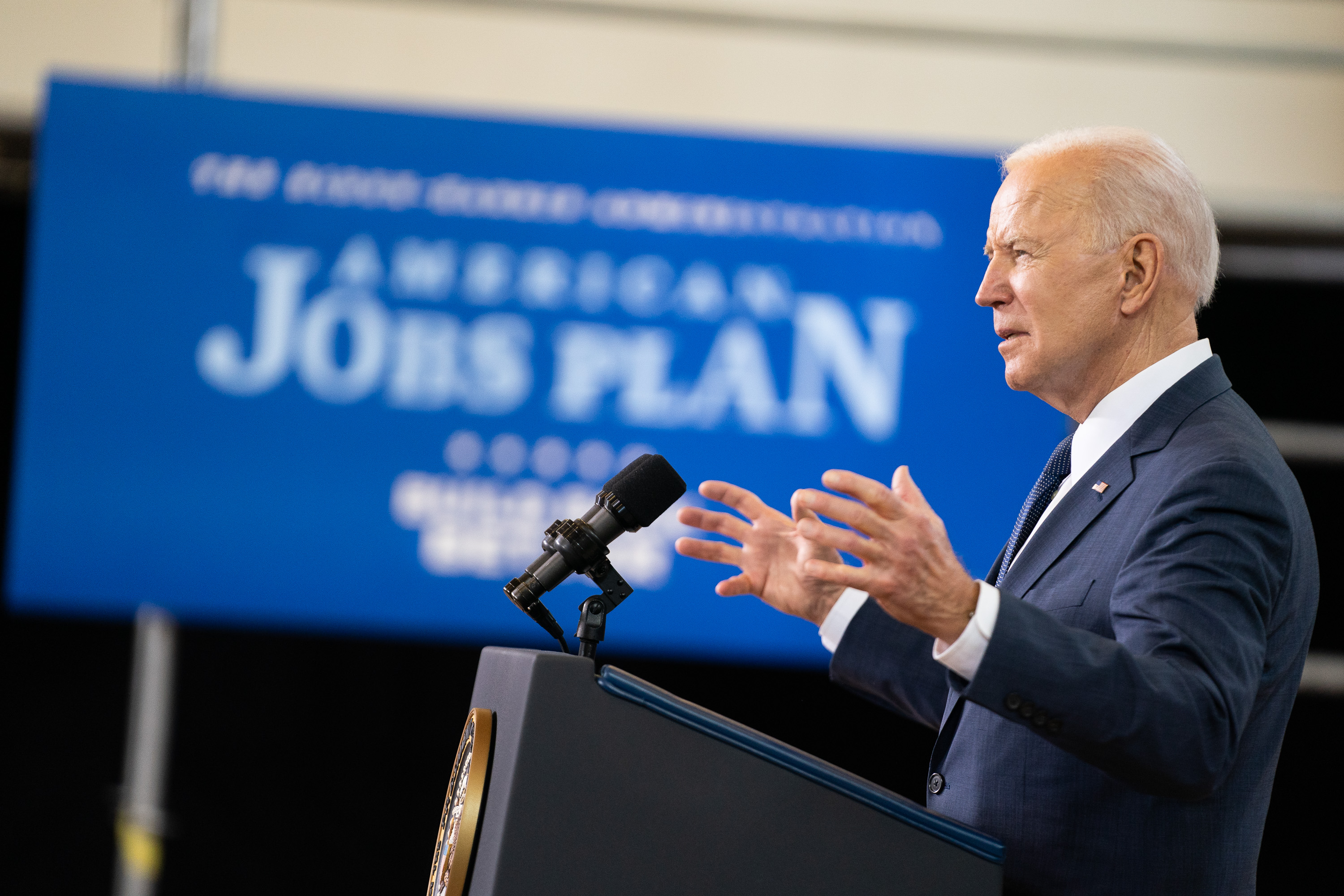
President Biden speaks about the American Job Plan in Pittsburgh in March 2021.

On March 31, 2021, Biden unveiled details of his $2.3 trillion American Jobs Plan (which, when combined with the American Families Plan, amounted to $4 trillion in infrastructure spending), which he pitched as "a transformative effort to overhaul the nation's economy". The plan aimed to create millions of jobs, bolster labor unions, expand labor protections, and address climate change.

==== Physical infrastructure ====
The plan called for $621 billion of spending on transportation infrastructure. That included $115 billion towards highways and roads, $80 billion to improve American railways, $85 billion to modernize public transportation, $25 billion for airports, $174 billion to incentivize adoption of electric vehicles (including $15 billion for the construction of 500,000 electric vehicle charging stations by 2030), and $17 billion for inland waterways, coastal ports, land ports of entry and ferries. It also called for electrifying at least 20% of the country's yellow school bus fleet. In March 2024, the Washington Post published an article called, "Biden’s $7.5 billion investment in EV charging has only produced 7 stations in two years."

The plan called for $100 billion in funding for American energy infrastructure, aiming to transition the country to 100% carbon-free electricity production by 2035. It intended to establish a "Grid Deployment Authority" within the Department of Energy to support the construction of high-voltage transmission lines.

==== Infrastructure "at home" ====
The plan included $213 billion for building and retrofitting more than 2 million homes and $40 billion to improve public housing. It also sought to end exclusionary zoning. The plan included $111 billion for modernizing drinking water, wastewater, and storm water systems. $45 billion of that was intended to replace 100% of the country's lead water piping. The plan aimed to deliver universal high-speed broadband coverage.

The AJP proposed a $16 billion investment in plugging "orphan wells", abandoned wells that continually release methane emissions. The plan contained $100 billion to construct and upgrade public schools, $25 billion to upgrade childcare facilities, and $12 billion to spend on community colleges. The AJP also contained a proposal for a Civilian Climate Corps modeled loosely after the Civilian Conservation Corps (CCC) created during the New Deal. (Note: On April 20, 2021, Democratic Senator Ed Markey and Representative Alexandria Ocasio-Cortez introduced new legislation for a Civilian Climate Corps, which aims to hire 1.5 million Americans over five years; three months later, a version of this was promoted in a letter by 80 congresspeople for potential inclusion in the reconciliation bill.) It proposed that $10 billion be allocated for the program, which the White House stated would create somewhere between 10,000 and 20,000 jobs. In contrast, during its nine years in operation, around three million people participated in the original CCC.

==== Research and development ====
The plan would have spent $180 billion on research and development, including substantial expenditures in clean energy and basic climate research. It would also have spent $50 billion on semiconductor technology. The plan set aside $300 billion for manufacturing expenditures.

==== "Care economy" ====
The plan included $400 billion to expand access to home- or community-based care for seniors and people with disabilities.

==== PRO Act ====
The passage of the proposed Protecting the Right to Organize Act (PRO Act) was included as part of the proposal. The legislation would bolster unions by overriding state right-to-work laws and safeguarding union elections.

==== Funding ====
The funding was planned to come from raising the corporate tax rate as a part of a proposed "Made in America Tax Plan". This would have partially reversed the Tax Cuts and Jobs Act of 2017. The corporate tax rate would have been raised from 21% to 28%, bringing it closer to the pre-2017 rate of 35%. The plan aimed to raise over $2 trillion by 2036, with other methods including ending subsidies for fossil fuel companies, increasing the global minimum tax from roughly 13% to 21%, and deficit spending.

Also planned was an increase of the global intangible low-taxed income (GILTI) from 10.5% to 21%. GILTI taxes target intangible assets like patents, copyright, and trademarks that can sometimes be used by companies for tax avoidance. This tax was created in 2017 to discourage U.S.-based companies from shifting profits to corporate tax havens.

=== Bipartisan bill ===
On July 28, Senate negotiators announced that a $1.2 trillion agreement for physical infrastructure had been reached. According to NPR.org, this included:

- $110 billion for roads, bridges and other major projects;
- $11 billion in transportation safety programs;
- $39 billion in transit modernization and improved accessibility;
- $66 billion in rail;
- $7.5 billion to build a national network of electric vehicle chargers;
- $73 billion in power infrastructure and clean energy transmission and
- $65 billion for broadband development.

The bill also made the Minority Business Development Agency a permanent agency. On August 10, The Senate voted 69–31 to advance the bill. On November 5, the House of Representatives passed it, 228–206. Biden signed the legislation into law on November 15.

=== Reception ===
The Center for American Progress (CAP), a liberal think tank, lauded the original AJP for its focus on climate justice. The program also received support from organized labor, with AFL–CIO president Richard Trumka praising the plan for its inclusion of the PRO Act. Senator Bernie Sanders spoke favorably of the plan while arguing that the White House should go even further.

Political conservatives dismissed the original legislation as costly and challenged the inclusion of policy areas not traditionally considered "infrastructure". Republican senator Ted Cruz criticized the plan, arguing that it would lead to job losses and served as a "Green New Deal-lite masquerading as an infrastructure plan". Republican House minority leader Kevin McCarthy called the plan "[m]ajor expansions of government agencies and even more inflation that will lead to higher costs for all Americans."

== American Families Plan ==
In April 2021, the Biden administration announced details of the American Families Plan (AFP).

=== Original proposal ===
==== "Care Economy" ====
The third part of the original Build Back Better agenda, the American Families Plan, set aside $1 trillion in new spending and $800 billion in tax credits (both over ten years). This included:

- $200 billion in spending on childcare, ensuring that no family has to pay more than 7% of their income on childcare,
- ~$200 billion to make pre-kindergarten universally available for free,
- >$200 billion towards government-subsidized paid family and medical leave,
- ~$300 billion towards making community college free for all Americans, and
- ~$200 billion on health insurance subsidies available through the Affordable Care Act healthcare exchanges.

It would have extended the boost to the child tax credit made in the American Rescue Plan, which effectively turned the credit into a child allowance. It would also revoke a federal restriction on people with felony drug convictions from obtaining food benefits through the Supplemental Nutrition Assistance Program (SNAP).

==== Funding ====
The bill was to have been at least partially funded by a number of tax hikes on high-income Americans and investors, including restoring the top marginal income tax rate to its pre-2017 level of 39.6% and nearly doubling the capital gains tax for people earning more than $1 million, as well as eliminating a provision in the tax code that reduces capital gains on some inherited assets, like vacation homes. It would also have raised revenue by boosting the Internal Revenue Service's budget by $80 billion (over ten years), which the White House estimated could raise over $700 billion in revenue that otherwise would have been lost to tax evasion. It would also have required banks to report total account outflows and inflows to the IRS to help detect tax evasion.

=== Reconciliation bill ===
==== Build Back Better Act ====
House speaker Nancy Pelosi's speech of November 2021 summarizing the final contents of the House bill

A $3.5 trillion reconciliation bill that included measures related to climate change, family aid, and expansions to Medicare was rolled out, but failed to win the support of Republicans or Democratic senators Joe Manchin and Kyrsten Sinema. On October 28, 2021, the White House released a new $1.75 trillion framework, and the House of Representatives passed the bill on November 19, 2021, but it still struggled to win Democratic Senator Joe Manchin's support for using the reconciliation process. After it ultimately failed to match his envisioned cost, Manchin rejected the bill, dooming its passage.

==== Inflation Reduction Act ====
In July 2022, revived negotiations between Manchin and Senate majority leader Chuck Schumer yielded a deal on a slimmed-down and reworked version of the original bill, the Inflation Reduction Act of 2022. This bill would raise $737 billion in revenue while spending $437 billion. The remaining $300 billion would go toward deficit reduction. The bill's main goals include reducing current and future inflation, reforming corporate taxing, lowering prescription drug prices for consumers, extending health insurance subsidies through the Affordable Care Act, and curbing greenhouse gas emissions while boosting domestic energy production.

The Senate passed the Inflation Reduction Act on August 7, 2022, on a 51–50 vote, with a tie-breaking vote from Vice President Kamala Harris, returning the amended bill to the House. On August 12, the House passed the bill on a 220–207 vote, and President Biden signed it into law on August 16.

== See also ==
- Bidenomics
- European Green Deal
- Next Generation EU
- Square Deal
- The New Freedom
- New Deal
- Fair Deal
- New Frontier
- Great Society
