= Southern Belle (KCS train) =

Passenger train

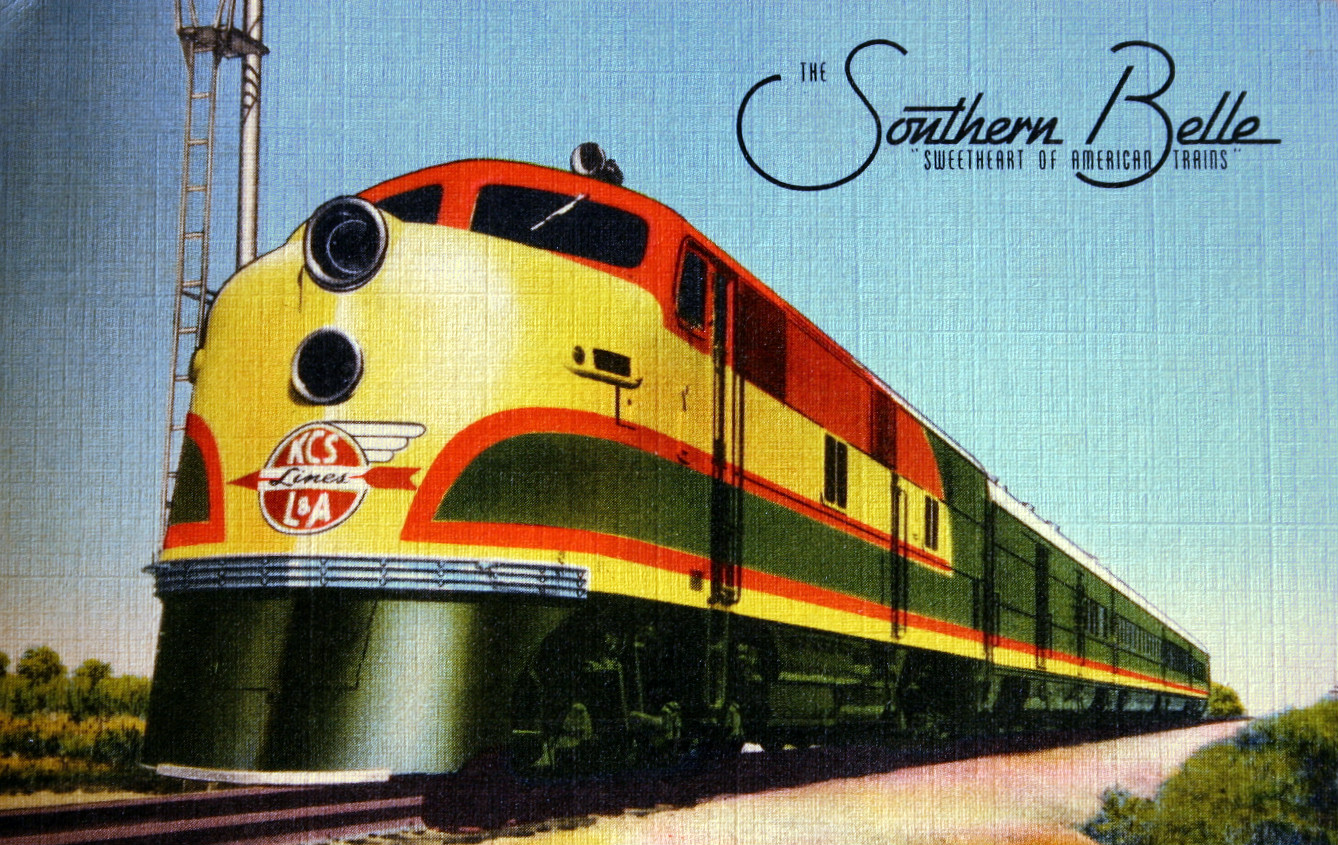
- Postcard depiction of the Southern Belle in 1941

Overview
- Service type: Intercity
- Status: Discontinued
- Locale: Midwest and Southern United States
- First service: September 2, 1940
- Last service: November 3, 1969
- Former operator: Kansas City Southern Railway

Route
- Termini: Kansas City, Missouri; New Orleans, Louisiana
- Stops: Joplin, Texarkana, Shreveport, Alexandria, Baton Rouge
- Distance travelled: 868.1 mi (1,397.1 km)
- Average journey time: 21 1/2 hours
- Service frequency: daily
- Train numbers: 1 and 2

On-board services
- Seating arrangements: Chair cars
- Sleeping arrangements: Roomettes and double bedrooms (1961)
- Catering facilities: Diner-lounges (1961)

Technical
- Track gauge: 4 ft 8 1/2 in (1,435 mm)
- Operating speed: 40–42 mph (64–68 km/h)

The Southern Belle was a named passenger train service offered by Kansas City Southern Railway (KCS) from the 1940s through the 1960s, running between Kansas City, Missouri, and New Orleans, Louisiana.

The service was inaugurated on September 2, 1940. To promote the new train, KCS held a beauty contest to find "Miss Southern Belle," a young woman whose image would be used in advertising materials systemwide. Local competitions were held before the train's launch in all of the cities that the KCS served. The ultimate winner of the competition, Margaret Landry, was the winner of the local competition in Baton Rouge, Louisiana. She was selected as "Miss Southern Belle" at the final competition in New Orleans, Louisiana, on August 24, 1940. She briefly became a screen actress, being most famous for her cameo as Teresa Guadalupe in The Leopard Man of 1943.

The last run of the Southern Belle was on November 3, 1969.

== 1953 derailment ==
On April 29, 1953, heavy rainfall washed out a section of track near Montgomery, Louisiana, causing five cars of the train to derail. There were 10 injuries.

== Equipment used ==
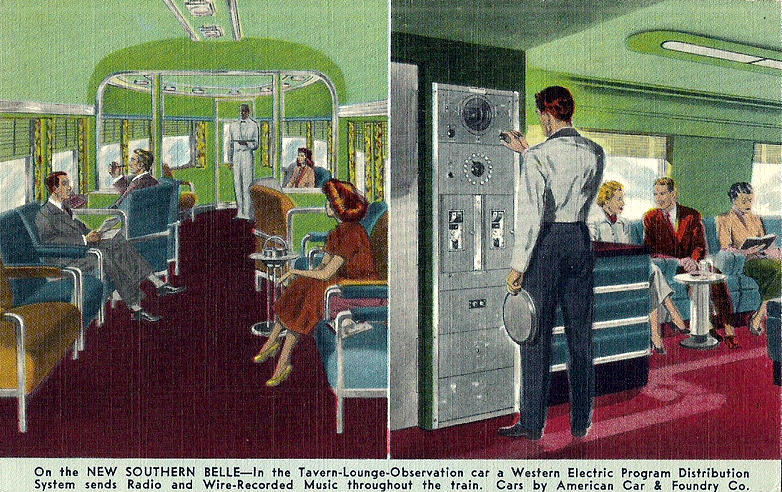
Postcard depiction, circa 1948, of the tavern-observation car. A radio allowed broadcasts and music to be heard throughout the train.

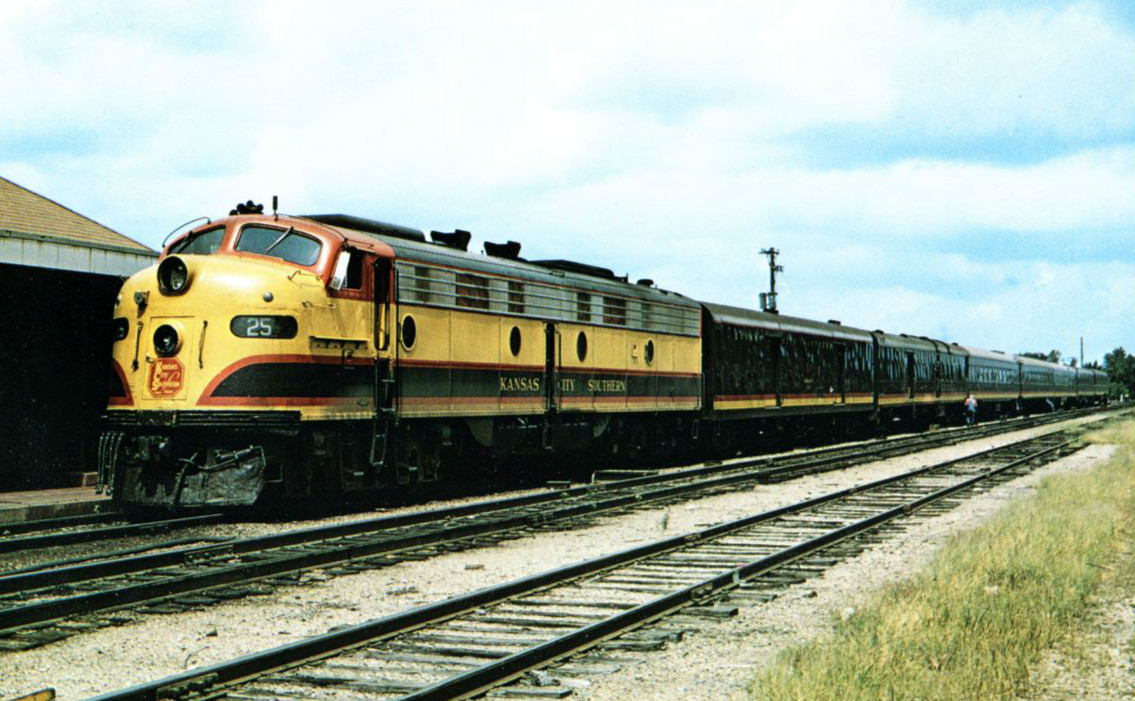
The Southern Belle in 1959

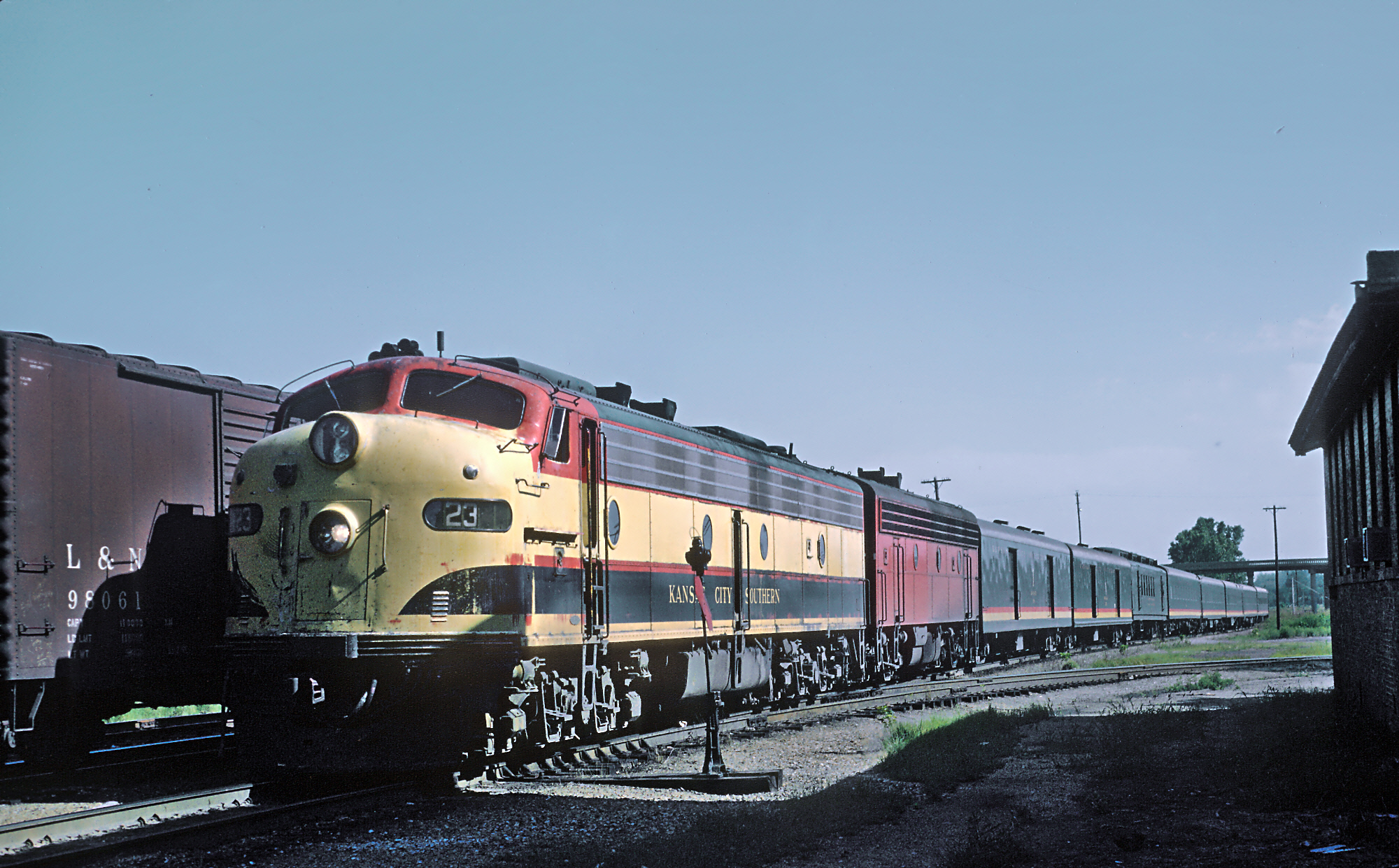
The Southern Belle at Pittsburg, KS on July 30, 1967

Just before inauguration, Pullman-Standard delivered three new lightweight passenger car sets to the KCS for use on the Southern Belle. Each set consisted of a combination baggage-RPO-dormitory (car numbers 64, 65 and 66), a 74-seat coach chair car (cars 234, Pittsburg; 235, Joplin; and 236, Texarkana), and a dining-observation car (car numbers 54, Kansas City; 55, Shreveport; and 56, New Orleans).

The KCS rebuilt five heavyweight Pullman sleepers for use on the Southern Belle, making them look like their lightweight counterparts and increasing the number of double bedrooms in each. Cars Siloam Springs (formerly McBurney) and Sulphur Springs (formerly McLarty) were rebuilt in time for the train's inauguration. Initially, Pullman service was only offered between New Orleans and Shreveport, Louisiana. In 1941, car Barksdale (formerly McAllisterville) was added to the train's operation when Pullman service was extended from Shreveport to Kansas City. The first two rebuilt cars were joined a few months later by rebuilt cars State Capital (formerly McElheran) and Mena (formerly McKullo) on the southern leg of the train's schedule.

After World War II, the train was re-equipped with some new cars built in 1948 by American Car and Foundry (ACF), and by rebuilding some of the original Pullman-Standard cars. Two of the diner-observation cars were rebuilt into tavern-observation cars; car 54, Kansas City (renamed to Good Cheer), and 55, Shreveport (renamed Hospitality), remained in Southern Belle service. The new cars built by ACF equipped two new consists and entered regular service on April 3, 1949. Each of the new consists included:

- one combination baggage-RPO-dormitory (car #67 and #68)
- one 62-seat coach chair car (car #239, Kansas City; and #240, Texarkana)
- two 60-seat coach chair cars (car #241, Shreveport; #242, Alexandria; #243, Baton Rouge; and #244, New Orleans)
- one 36-seat diner (car #57, Old Plantation; and #58, Mountain Home)
- four 14-roomette, 4-double bedroom sleepers (cars Arthur Stilwell, Colonel Fordyce, Harvey Couch, Job Edson, Leonor Loree, Stuart Knott, William Buchanan and William Edenborn)

Sample Consist
Summer 1965
- Train: KCS #1
- Baggage (Kansas City to Texarkana); Baggage (Kansas City to Shreveport); Box Express (Alexandria to West Yard); Box Express (Shreveport to West Yard); Baggage (Shreveport to New Orleans); RPO-Baggage-Dormitory; 60-seat Coach; 72-seat Coach; Diner; 14-4 Sleeper; 60-seat Coach (Kansas City to Neosho)

KCS was pro-passenger until the Postal Service terminated mail contracts in 1967. Previous to that, KCS had continued to purchase new baggage/express cars, as well as the last intercity coaches by Pullman-Standard in 1965. Full dining car service was reduced to meals in ex-NYC tavern observation cars which had been modified with lunch counters serving food selections from a reduced menu, which was termed "cafe car service" by KCS. This new service was aimed at the now mostly coach travelers who continued to patronize these trains. Spartian interiors, which greatly simplified servicing, included tile floors, vinyl seating, dark green tinted windows which eliminated the need for window shades, and fixed vestibule steps, were among the cost saving features that were found the new 1965 coaches, as well as the older coaches remaining in service, and in all the ex-NYC observation cafe cars. KCS wisely recognized the need to keep costs to a minimum, while continuing to provide a high level of service that was satisfactory to the remaining patrons.

The previously mentioned tavern-observation cars rounded out the ends of the two consists. Between 1962 and 1964, these cars were renumbered and the car names were dropped. The train's consists remained relatively unchanged between 1948 and the end of 1968 with Pullman and meal service, although in later years the diner-lounge cars were replaced by the ex-NYC tavern observation cars serving meals and beverages. When Pullman closed its doors on December 31, 1968, KCS elected not to continue sleeping car service and it was discontinued. From January 1, 1969, until November 2, 1969, the train operated with only a baggage car, coaches, and the Ex-NYC observation cars. One of the ex-NYC cars is on display in the town of Jackson, La. Several of the 1965-vintage Pullman-Standard coaches remain in regular service today with the North Carolina DOT "Piedmont" passenger train service between Raleigh and Charlotte. Good Cheer has been preserved by the Gulf Coast Chapter NRHS, which displays the car at the Houston Railroad Museum.

== New Southern Belle ==
In May 1995 the new president of the railroad, Michael Haverty, ordered the creation of an executive train to entertain shippers and guests. Under his direction, four former Canadian National locomotives, three EMD FP9As and an F9B, were purchased and painted a very dark green, similar to the paint scheme of the business fleet. Numbered 1-4 and named Meridian, Shreveport, Pittsburg, and Vicksburg, they were placed into executive service.

In 2007, KCS changed the paint scheme to the more traditional and "heritage" paint scheme. The locomotive #4 was also removed from service, and later renumbered 34 and donated to the Kansas City Union Station Rail Experience. In December the train pulls the Holiday Express, and it makes the rounds to several KCS cities and stations.
