= Black Diamond (train) =

Flagship passenger train of the Lehigh Valley Railroad (LV)

Overview
- Service type: Inter-city rail
- Status: discontinued
- Locale: Northeastern United States
- First service: 1896
- Last service: 11 May 1959
- Former operators: Lehigh Valley Railroad; Reading Railroad

Route
- Termini: New York City, U.S. Buffalo, New York, U.S.
- Distance travelled: 463.5 miles (745.9 km)
- Service frequency: Daily
- Train numbers: 9 (northwestbound), 10 (southeastbound)

On-board services
- Seating arrangements: coach
- Catering facilities: dining car
- Observation facilities: parlor car

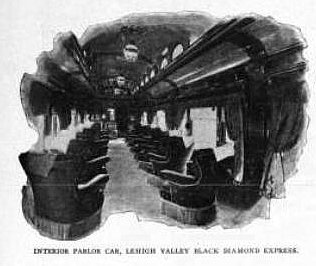
Interior of a parlor car, c. 1899.

The Black Diamond, also known as the Black Diamond Express, was the flagship passenger train of the Lehigh Valley Railroad (LV). It ran from New York to Buffalo from 1896 until May 11, 1959, when the Lehigh Valley's passenger service was reduced to four mainline trains.

== History ==
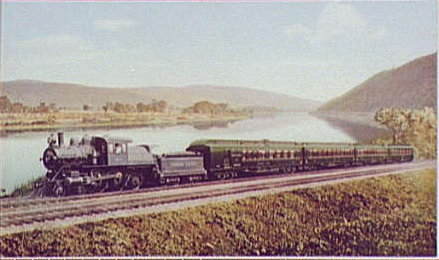
The Black Diamond Express in 1898.

Service between Jersey City, New Jersey and Buffalo began on 18 May 1896, It originally used the Pennsylvania Railroad's Exchange Place Station, where passengers could board ferries to station to New York. In 1913, the train was forced by the PRR to vacate the station so the eastern terminus was changed to the Central Railroad of New Jersey's Communipaw Terminal. That lasted only five years, as the United States Railroad Administration decided in 1918 to re-route all Lehigh Valley trains into New York Penn Station to centralize traffic. For most of its existence the Black Diamond used the Lehigh Valley Terminal in Buffalo. The Black Diamond competed with services offered by the Delaware, Lackawanna and Western Railroad and the New York Central Railroad; although slower than either of these, its level of service won it the nicknames "the Handsomest Train in the World" and "the Honeymoon Express." In 1940, the train was provided with the line's first set of lightweight streamlined coaches, designed by Otto Kuhler, who also designed streamlined shroudings for the existing 4-6-2 Pacific locomotives that hauled the train. Later, the Pacific engine was replaced by Alco's PA-1 diesels, which were painted Cornell red with black playing a secondary role. The black was used in a role similar to the "cat whiskers" that appeared on the PRR's GG-1's.

Prior to the cutback of the Black Diamond the Lehigh operated a counterpart night train from New York City to Buffalo, The Star. Between Sayre, Pennsylvania and Geneva, New York both the Black Diamond and the Star followed a secondary line, serving Ithaca and other Central New York cities, as opposed to following the LV's double-tracked main line slightly to the west.

The train had a branch originating in Philadelphia in conjunction with the Reading Railroad at the company's Reading Terminal. The branch would link up with the main part of the Black Diamond in Bethlehem, Pennsylvania.

The train's last run was on May 11, 1959, due to widespread cuts to all Lehigh Valley passenger service. All LV passenger service ended on February 4, 1961.

== Origin of name ==
The train was named for the railroad's major cargo, anthracite coal, which was known as "the black diamond" because of its exceptional hardness and high value. As a result, the railroad used "The Route of the Black Diamond" as its slogan.

== Miscellaneous ==
The Lehigh Valley Railroad also operated trains #28 and #29 (the John Wilkes) which also boasted Otto Kuhler-designed streamlining shrouds very similar in design to the Black Diamond.

== In popular culture ==
- On April 23, 1927, Reverend A. W. Nix recorded a two-part singing sermon called "The Black Diamond Express to Hell," accompanied by his congregation. According to the lyrics, "Sin is the engineer, Pleasure is the headlight, and the Devil is the conductor." When the Black Diamond leaves the station "the bell is ringing, 'Hell-bound, Hell-bound' and the Devil cries out, 'All aboard for Hell.'"
- The Black Diamond is the name of an eight-piece alternative rock band from Edinburgh, Scotland that plays an amalgamation of Celtic music and American blues music. Their name was inspired by the Rev. A.W. Nix record, which had been reissued in the UK by Decca Records in 1951. The band's debut album was titled "Brimstone for Hell."

== Gallery ==
The Black Diamond Express in 1896

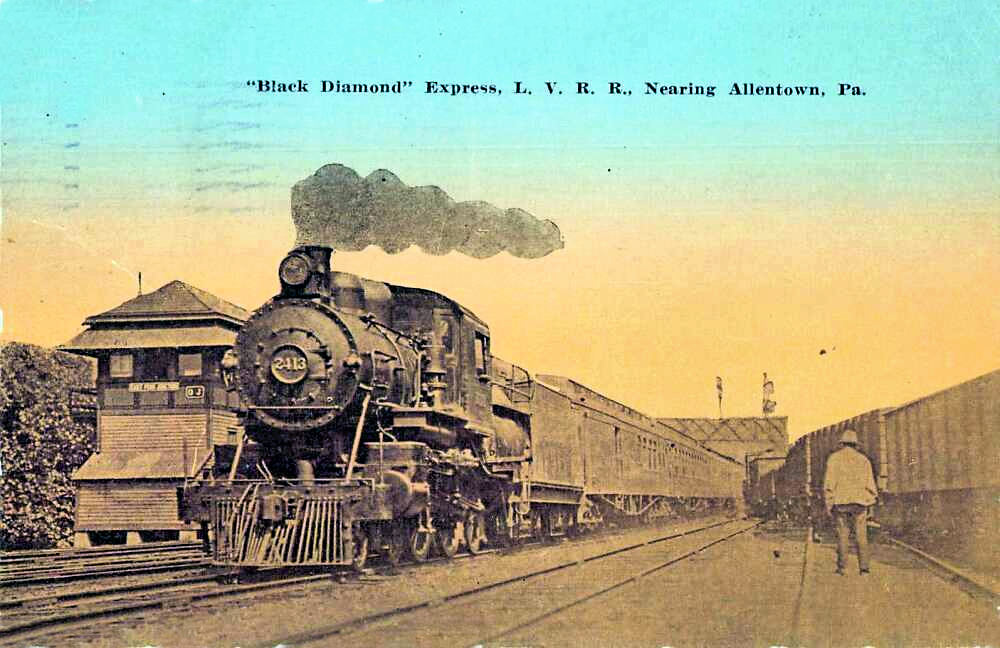
Black Diamond in 1900

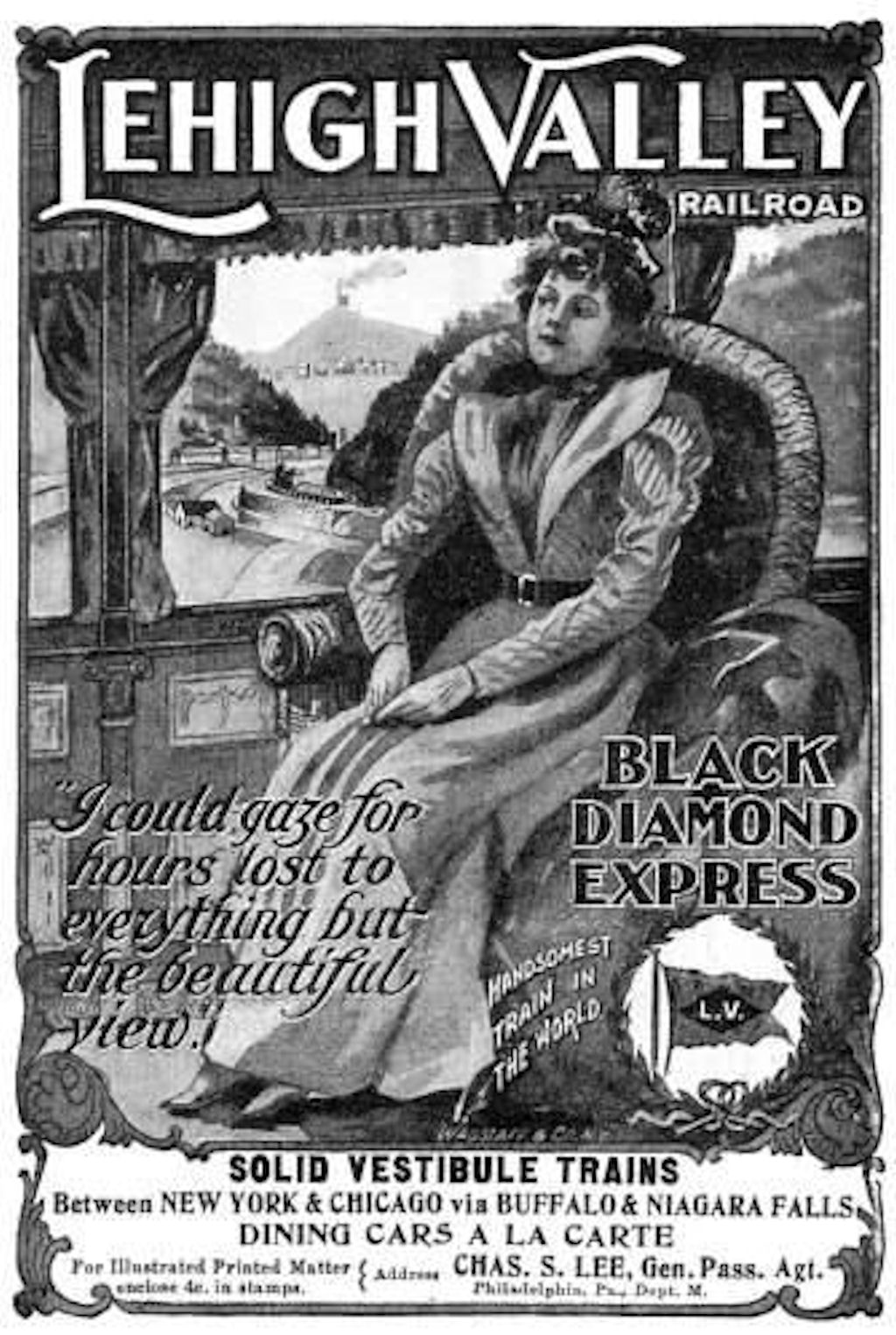
Black Diamond ad, 1921

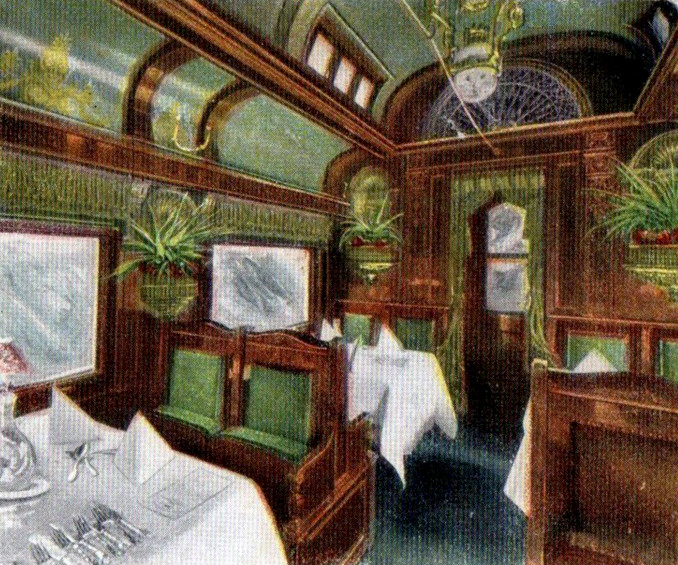
Dining car

== Sources ==
- "The 'Black Diamond' on the Lehigh". Railway and Locomotive Engineering. 20 (12). New York: Angus Sinclair Co.: 525–526 December 1907.
- Fisher, Charles E. (1921). "America's Most Famous Trains". Railroad History. 1 (1). Railway & Locomotive Historical Society: 24–26. JSTOR 43516721.
- Archer, Robert (1977). The Lehigh Valley Railroad, The Route of the Black Diamond. Berkeley, CA: Howell-North Books. p. 372. ISBN 0-8310-7113-3.
- Schafer, Mike (2000). More Classic American Railroads. Osceola, Wisconsin: MBI Publishing Co. ISBN 978-0-7603-0758-8.
