= List of presidential trips made by Gerald Ford (1976–77) =

This is a list of presidential trips made by Gerald Ford during 1976–77, the third and final year of his presidency as the 38th president of the United States.

This list excludes trips made by Gerald Ford within Washington, D.C., the U.S. federal capital in which the White House, the official residence and principal workplace of the president, is located. It also excludes the capital's immediate surroundings in Maryland and Virginia, such as Andrews Air Force Base in Maryland, where the president typically boards Air Force One for all trips outside the area. Also excluded are trips to Camp David, the country residence of the president.

== January 1976 ==
State or country	Areas visited	Dates	Details
Missouri	St. Louis	January 5	Addressed the American Farm Bureau Federation convention at Kiel Auditorium, and attended a convention luncheon at the Bel Air Hilton.
Michigan	Dearborn	January 31	Addressed the Midwest Republican Leadership Conference at the Hyatt Regency Dearborn.
Virginia	Williamsburg	January 31	Addressed a joint commemorative session of the Virginia General Assembly at the Old Capitol. Attended a Colonial Williamsburg Foundation dinner at the Williamsburg Lodge.

== February ==
State or country	Areas visited	Dates	Details
New Hampshire	Concord	February 7	Campaigned in the 1976 New Hampshire Republican presidential primary. Briefed state and local elected officials on the 1977 United States federal budget at Rundlett Junior High School.
New Hampshire	Nashua	February 7	Toured the Greenbriar Terrace nursing home. Addressed the Greater Nashua Chamber of Commerce dinner at Nashua Senior High School.
New Hampshire	Hollis	February 7	Attended a Bicentennial celebration at the Alpine Grove Lodge.
New Hampshire	Nashua	February 7–8	Stayed overnight at the home of Bank of New Hampshire chairman Davis Thurber.
New Hampshire	Bedford	February 8	Attended service at Bedford Presbyterian Church.
New Hampshire	Durham	February 8	Held a press conference at the Memorial Union Building. Gave a convocation address to the University of New Hampshire at the Lundholm Gymnasium.
Florida	Orlando	February 13	Held a press conference with members of Sigma Delta Chi at the Sheraton Orlando Jetport Inn.
Florida	Fort Lauderdale	February 13–14	Briefed local elected officials on the 1977 federal budget at the Bahia Mar Hotel, where he stayed overnight.
Florida	St. Petersburg	February 14	Met with senior citizens in Williams Park. Addressed Ford campaign volunteers at Bayfront Center.
Florida	Bay Pines	February 14	Toured Bay Pines Veterans Affairs Medical Center.
Florida	Fort Myers	February 14	Attended the Thomas Edison Pageant of Lights at Fort Myers Exhibition Hall.
Florida	Miami	February 14	Addressed a Federal Bar Association dinner at the Everglades Hotel.
Florida	Miami Beach	February 14	Addressed a National Parkinson Foundation fundraiser at the Fontainebleau Miami Beach.
Florida	Miami	February 14	Addressed Ford campaign volunteers at the Howard Johnson Plaza.
New Hampshire	Keene	February 19–20	Spoke at Keene High School and at Harper Acres Retirement Home. Stayed overnight at the home of former Keene mayor James A. Masiello.
New Hampshire	Dover	February 20	Spoke at the Elks lodge and at Dover High School.
New Hampshire	Portsmouth	February 20	Toured the Portsmouth Rehabilitation Center.
New Hampshire	Newington	February 20	Spoke at Newington Mall, stopping for ice cream at the Baskin-Robbins.
Florida	Miami	February 28	Presided over a naturalization ceremony at the Dade County Auditorium in Little Havana. Attended a reception for Ford campaign workers at the Miami Marriott.
Florida	West Palm Beach	February 28	Spoke at Palm Beach Mall.
Florida	Palm Beach	February 28	Spoke at Bethesda-by-the-Sea.
Florida	Lake Worth	February 28	Spoke at Lake Worth City Hall.
Florida	Lantana	February 28	Spoke at Lantana Bicentennial Park.
Florida	Boynton Beach	February 28	Spoke at Sunshine Square Shopping Center.
Florida	Briny Breezes	February 28	Spoke at Briny Breezes Town Offices.
Florida	Delray Beach	February 28	Spoke at Delray Beach Park.
Florida	Highland Beach	February 28	Spoke at Seagate of Highland Condominiums.
Florida	Boca Raton	February 28	Spoke at Spanish River Park and Royal Palm Plaza.
Florida	Deerfield Beach	February 28	Spoke at Deerfield Beach Fishing Pier.
Florida	Hillsboro Beach	February 28	Spoke at Hillsboro Beach City Hall.
Florida	Coral Springs	February 28	Spoke at Coral Springs Office Building.
Florida	Sarasota	February 28–29	Attended a reception for Ford campaign workers at Sarasota–Bradenton International Airport. Stayed overnight at the home of Sarasota lawyer William Getzen. Attended service at the Church of the Redeemer. Attended a Ford campaign barbecue at the Sarasota Shrine Hall. Toured the Sarasota Welfare Home.
Florida	Tampa	February 29	Attended a reception for Ford campaign workers at the Austin Center.

== March ==
State or country	Areas visited	Dates	Details
Illinois	Springfield	March 5	Participated in the cornerstone ceremony for a new visitor center at Lincoln Home National Historic Site. Addressed the Farm Forum and the Illinois Teachers of Hearing Impaired Children at the Forum 30 Hotel.
Illinois	Peoria	March 5–6	Signed a charter for a plan to reconstruct Fort Crevecoeur in a ceremony at Greater Peoria Airport. Spoke at Bradley University's Robertson Memorial Field House and at the Peoria Masonic Temple. Stayed overnight at the Peoria Hilton.
Illinois	Champaign	March 6	Participated in a public forum at Champaign Centennial High School.
Illinois	Thomasboro	March 6	Toured a local family farm.
Illinois	Rantoul	March 6	Addressed the Chanute Community Foundation at the Redwood Inn.
Illinois	Carterville	March 6	Spoke at John A. Logan College.
Illinois	Rockford	March 11–12	Addressed the Winnebago County Farm Bureau Forum and the Greater Rockford Tool, Die and Machining Association at the Clock Tower Inn, where he stayed overnight. Spoke at Cherryvale Mall.
Illinois	Wheaton	March 12	Spoke at Wheaton College's Edman Chapel.
Illinois	Chicago	March 12	Addressed the Chicago Council on Foreign Relations at the Palmer House Hotel.
Illinois	Buffalo Grove	March 12	Held a campaign rally at Buffalo Grove High School.
Illinois	Chicago	March 12–13	Stayed at the Marriott Chicago O'Hare.
North Carolina	Greensboro	March 13	Held a press conference at Guilford College's Sigmund Sternberger Auditorium. Attended a Bicentennial event at Guilford Courthouse National Military Park.
North Carolina	Winston-Salem	March 13	Spoke at Hanes Mall.
North Carolina	Wilkesboro	March 13	Spoke at West Wilkes High School.
North Carolina	Charlotte	March 20	Attended a dinner for Representative James G. Martin at the Woodlawn Holiday Inn. Addressed the Future Homemakers of America state convention at Charlotte Civic Center. Visited the Ford campaign Mecklenburg County headquarters at the Park Selwyn Building.
North Carolina	Asheville	March 20	Spoke at Asheville Mall. Participated in the Citizens Forum at Lenoir–Rhyne College.
California	San Francisco	March 26	Addressed the American Textile Manufacturers Institute convention at the Fairmont San Francisco. Attended a campaign fundraiser at the Sheraton Palace Hotel.
California	Los Angeles	March 26–27	Attended a campaign fundraiser at the Century Plaza Hotel, where he stayed overnight.
California	Fresno	March 27	Attended a California Republican State Central Committee luncheon at the Fresno Convention Center.
Wisconsin	La Crosse	March 27	Took questions from the public at the Mary E. Sawyer Auditorium.

== April ==
State or country	Areas visited	Dates	Details
Wisconsin	Milwaukee	April 2	Held a press conference sponsored by the Milwaukee Press Club at the Marc Plaza Hotel. Addressed a Greater Milwaukee Ethnic Organizations luncheon at Mader's Restaurant. Attended a Wisconsin Manufacturers & Commerce forum at the Marc Plaza Hotel.
Wisconsin	West Bend	April 2–3	Spoke at the West Bend East and West High Schools fieldhouse. Attended a reception for Ford campaign workers at the West Bend Holiday Inn, where he stayed overnight.
Wisconsin	Campbellsport	April 3	Toured a dairy farm.
Wisconsin	Fond du Lac	April 3	Addressed the Wisconsin Farm Forum at Goodrich High School. Spoke in Fond du Lac Town Square.
Wisconsin	Oshkosh	April 3	Spoke at Wittman Regional Airport.
Wisconsin	Green Bay	April 3	Toured the Green Bay Packers headquarters and dedicated the Green Bay Packers Hall of Fame at Brown County Veterans Memorial Arena, where he then participated in a public forum.
Texas	San Antonio	April 9	Spoke at the Alamo. Attended a reception for Ford campaign workers at the Hilton Palacio del Rio. Addressed Texas Republicans at the San Antonio Convention Center.
Texas	Dallas	April 9	Attended a Ford campaign fundraiser at the Fairmont Hotel.
Texas	Arlington	April 9	Threw out the ceremonial first pitch on Major League Baseball's Opening Day at Arlington Stadium.
Texas	Irving	April 9	Addressed the Irving Bar Association's Law Day Dinner at Texas Stadium.
Texas	Dallas	April 9–10	Stayed overnight at the Fairmont Hotel.
Texas	El Paso	April 10	Addressed the Texas Grain and Feed Association convention at El Paso Civic Center. Dedicated War Memorial Plaza.
Texas	Amarillo	April 10	Addressed the Texas Panhandle Lions Club dinner at the Amarillo Hilton.
Texas	Canyon	April 10	Participated in a public forum at the West Texas State University fieldhouse.
Indiana	Indianapolis	April 22–23	Interviewed at WRTV studios. Spoke at Butler University's Hinkle Fieldhouse. Stayed overnight at the Indiana Governor's Residence. Attended a reception for Ford campaign workers at state campaign headquarters in Circle Tower. Addressed the Indiana Broadcasters Association convention at the Rodeway Inn.
Indiana	Evansville	April 23	Held a public forum at Vanderburgh Auditorium. Attended a reception for Ford campaign workers at the Executive Inn.
Georgia	Atlanta	April 23	Attended a Military Order of the World Wars ceremony at Peachtree Presbyterian Church. Attended a reception for Ford campaign workers at the Radisson Inn. Attended a Freedoms Foundation dinner at the Atlanta Marriott Perimeter Center. Held a public forum at Peachtree High School.
Louisiana	Bossier City	April 27	Attended the Holiday in Dixie festival at Barksdale Air Force Base. Addressed the Ambassadors Club at a private residence.
Louisiana	Shreveport	April 27	Attended the Louisiana National Guard Military Ball at the Shreveport Convention Hall.
Texas	Tyler	April 27–28	Stayed overnight at the Sheraton Inn. Held a public forum at Tyler Junior College.
Texas	Fort Worth	April 28	Attended a Fort Worth-Tarrant County Bar Association luncheon at the Tarrant County Convention Center.
Texas	Houston	April 28–29	Held a public forum at Hyatt Regency Houston Downtown. Attended a reception for Ford campaign workers at the Sheraton hotel. Held a public forum at Spring Branch School Coliseum. Stayed overnight at the Hyatt Regency, where he also held a press conference and addressed the Texas Nursing Home Association convention.
Texas	Conroe	April 29	Dedicated the Montgomery County War Memorial Park. Attended a reception for Ford campaign workers at the Holiday Inn.
Texas	Waco	April 29	Held a public forum at Baylor University's Waco Hall. Participated in a ribbon-cutting ceremony opening the restored Waco Suspension Bridge. Attended a reception for Ford campaign workers at the Waco Convention Center.
Texas	Dallas	April 29–30	Spoke at North Park Mall. Stayed overnight at the Dallas Hilton. Held a public forum at the North Park Inn Convention Center.
Texas	Lubbock	April 30	Attended a Texas Tech University Open Forum at Lubbock Municipal Coliseum. Attended a reception for Ford campaign workers at the Hilton Inn. Attended a campaign fundraiser at a private residence.
Texas	Abilene	April 30	Attended an Open Forum and Bicentennial celebration sponsored by the Abilene Jaycees at Abilene Civic Center.

== May ==
State or country	Areas visited	Dates	Details
Indiana	Fort Wayne	May 2–3	Held a public forum at Allen County War Memorial Coliseum. Attended a reception for Ford campaign workers at the Marriott Inn, where he stayed overnight.
Indiana	Indianapolis	May 3	Attended a briefing for local government officials on general revenue sharing at the Murat Shrine Temple, where he also held a press conference.
Alabama	Birmingham	May 3	Held a public forum at Birmingham–Jefferson Civic Center, where he also attended a reception for Ford campaign workers. Held a campaign rally at Wilson Park.
Nebraska	Omaha	May 7–8	Visited the Gerald R. Ford Birthsite and Gardens. Attended the groundbreaking ceremony for an expansion of Archbishop Bergan-Mercy Hospital. Attended a reception for Ford campaign workers at the Ramada Inn. Addressed a Farm Forum at the Holiday Inn West, where he stayed overnight.
Nebraska	Lincoln	May 8	Gave the commencement address at the University of Nebraska–Lincoln's NU Sports Complex. Attended a reception for Ford campaign workers, and addressed the Nebraska Educational Secretaries Association convention, at the Lincoln Hilton.
Missouri	Independence	May 8	Dedicated a statue of former president Harry S. Truman at the Truman Courthouse. Visited the home of Truman's widow Bess and toured the Harry S. Truman Presidential Library and Museum.
Michigan	Southfield	May 12	Interviewed at WXYZ-TV studios.
Michigan	Bloomfield Hills	May 12	Addressed the Detroit Economic Club at Roma Hall.
Michigan	Birmingham	May 12	Held a campaign rally in Shain Park.
Michigan	Troy	May 12	Rested at the Somerset Inn.
Michigan	Sterling Heights	May 12	Toured the Ford Motor Company Van Dyke Plant.
Michigan	Roseville	May 12	Held a campaign rally at Macomb Mall. Toured the Macomb County Republican Party phone-banking operation.
Tennessee	Johnson City	May 14	Held a campaign rally at Freedom Hall Convention Center.
Tennessee	Memphis	May 14	Dedicated the Commerce Square Fountain. Attended a reception for Ford campaign workers at the Holiday Inn Rivermont.
Kentucky	Louisville	May 14	Attended a reception for Ford campaign workers at Freedom Hall. Signed legislation granting the president reserve callup authority outside times of national emergency at the Galt House Hotel, where he attended an Armed Forces Day dinner.
Michigan	Flint	May 14–15	Stayed overnight at the Holiday Inn. Boarded the Presidential Express for a whistle-stop train tour beginning at the Flint Amtrak station.
Michigan	Durand	May 15	Spoke from the rear platform of the Presidential Express.
Michigan	Lansing	May 15	Arrived on the Presidential Express and stopped for lunch at the Depot Restaurant.
Michigan	Battle Creek	May 15	Spoke from the rear platform of the Presidential Express.
Michigan	Kalamazoo	May 15	Spoke from the rear platform of the Presidential Express.
Michigan	Niles	May 15	Arrived on the Presidential Express, then took a motorcade to Plym Park to board Marine One.
Michigan	Holland	May 15	Participated in the Tulip Time Festival parade.
Michigan	Grand Rapids	May 15–16	Stayed overnight at a local residence. Attended service at Grace Episcopal Church.
Michigan	Saginaw	May 16	Participated in a Bicentennial celebration at Sherwood Elementary School.
Oregon	Medford	May 22	Toured the Medford Corporation lumber mill.
Oregon	Portland	May 22–23	Attended a reception for Ford campaign workers at the Sheraton-Portland Hotel. Addressed a World Affairs Council of Oregon forum at Lewis & Clark College's Pamplin Sports Center. Stayed overnight at the Sheraton-Portland Hotel. Attended service at Hinson Memorial Baptist Church. Gave the commencement address at Warner Pacific College.
Oregon	Pendleton	May 23	Held a campaign rally at the Pendleton Memorial Armory, where he also attended a reception for representatives of Oregon agricultural organizations.
California	Mission Viejo	May 23	Spoke at Mission Viejo High School, which was celebrating its 10th anniversary.
California	Laguna Woods	May 23	Spoke at Leisure World.
California	Laguna Hills	May 23–24	Stayed at the Hilton Inn.
California	Anaheim	May 24	Addressed the California Peace Officers' Association convention at the Sheraton hotel.
Nevada	Las Vegas	May 24	Addressed the International Council of Shopping Centers convention at the MGM Grand Hotel. Attended a reception for Ford campaign workers at the Las Vegas Convention Center.
California	San Diego	May 24	Held a public forum at the El Cortez Convention Center. Attended a reception for Ford campaign workers at the Little America Westgate Plaza Hotel.
California	Van Nuys	May 24	Held a campaign rally at Van Nuys Airport.
California	Los Angeles	May 24–25	Stayed at the Hyatt House Hotel.
California	San Jose	May 25	Held a campaign rally at the San Jose Center for the Performing Arts. Attended a luncheon at McCabe Hall.
California	Walnut Creek	May 25	Held a campaign rally at Walnut Creek Town Square. Attended a reception for Ford campaign workers at the Elks Club.
California	San Jose	May 25–26	Stayed at the Holiday Inn.
Ohio	Columbus	May 26	Attended the Governor's Conference on Aging at the Ohio Expo Center and State Fairgrounds. Met with Republican legislators at the Ohio Statehouse. Attended a reception for Ford campaign workers at the Neil House Hotel.

== June ==
State or country	Areas visited	Dates	Details
New Jersey	Paterson	June 6	Dedicated the Great Falls of the Passaic River as a National Historic Landmark District. Attended a reception for local civic and business leaders at the home of Mayor Lawrence Francis Kramer.
New Jersey	West Orange	June 6	Attended a reception for Ford campaign workers at the Town and Campus Motel.
Ohio	Cleveland	June 6	Attended a Cuyahoga County Republican Organization reception and addressed the National Conference of Christians and Jews regional award dinner at the Sheraton-Cleveland Hotel.
Ohio	Cincinnati	June 6–7	Stayed at the Stouffer's Cincinnati Towers. Attended a reception for local labor leaders, and a reception for Ford campaign workers, at the Cincinnati Convention Center.
Ohio	Middletown	June 7	Held a campaign rally at Middletown Mall.
Ohio	Dayton	June 7	Held a campaign rally at the Montgomery County Historical Society.
Ohio	Springfield	June 7	Held a press conference at Snyder Park. Held a campaign rally at the Springfield Art Center.
Ohio	Lima	June 7	Held a campaign rally at Lima Mall.
Ohio	Findlay	June 7	Held a campaign rally at the Elks Club.
Ohio	Bowling Green	June 7	Held a public forum at Bowling Green State University's Anderson Arena.
Ohio	Toledo	June 7	Held a press conference at Toledo Express Airport.
Missouri	Springfield	June 11	Met with delegates attending the Missouri State Republican Convention at the Howard Johnson's Motor Lodge Exhibition Hall.
Virginia	Norfolk	June 15	Addressed the Southern Baptist Convention at the Norfolk Scope.
Indiana	Indianapolis	June 22	Addressed the United States Jaycees convention at the Indiana Convention Center.
Puerto Rico	Dorado	June 26–28	Attended the 2nd G7 summit at the Dorado Beach Hotel.

== July ==
State or country	Areas visited	Dates	Details
Pennsylvania	Upper Merion Township	July 4	Established Valley Forge National Historical Park in a ceremony at the site.
Pennsylvania	Philadelphia	July 4	Celebrated the United States Bicentennial by visiting Independence Hall, where the Declaration of Independence was adopted exactly 200 years earlier. Attended a luncheon at The Bellevue-Stratford Hotel.
New York	New York	July 4	Participated in Operation Sail in New York Harbor, boarding the USS Forrestal and the USS Nashville.
Virginia	Charlottesville	July 5	Presided over a naturalization ceremony at Monticello.
New York	Plattsburgh	July 10	Visited the U.S. Olympic Team in their training area at the State University of New York at Plattsburgh, as they prepared to leave for the 1976 Summer Olympics in Montreal, Quebec.
Rhode Island	Newport	July 10	Boarded HMY Britannia at Naval Station Newport, greeting Queen Elizabeth II during her state visit to the United States.
Maryland	Baltimore	July 16	Boarded the Gorch Fock in the Inner Harbor, greeting West German chancellor Helmut Schmidt during his state visit to the United States.
Connecticut	Hartford	July 17	Met with delegates to the Connecticut State Republican Convention at the Hilton Inn. Addressed the convention at Bushnell Memorial Hall.
Mississippi	Jackson	July 30	Met with Mississippi Republican convention delegates at the Coliseum Ramada Inn.

== August ==
State or country	Areas visited	Dates	Details
Pennsylvania	Philadelphia	August 8	Met with Catholic leaders at The Spectrum. Addressed the International Eucharistic Congress at John F. Kennedy Stadium.
Missouri	Kansas City	August 15–20	Stayed at the Crown Center Hotel. Attended the 1976 Republican National Convention, with events taking place at the KCI Expo Center, Muehlebach Hotel, Hilton Plaza Inn, Continental Hotel, Almeda Plaza Hotel, and Kemper Arena.
Kansas	Russell	August 20	Held a campaign rally with Senator Bob Dole, who Ford had just chosen as his running mate, at the Russell County Courthouse.
Colorado	Vail	August 20–29	Summer vacation at the home of Richard Bass. Visited the Vail Golf Course, the homes of Trammell Crow and Fitzhugh Scott, the Left Bank Restaurant, Skeika's Discotheque (where The Ink Spots were performing), and the Vail Village Inn Playhouse. Attended the Pro-Am Charity Golf Tournament at the Mark Resort and Tennis Club.
Wyoming	Park County	August 29	Toured Yellowstone National Park.
South Dakota	Rapid City	August 29	Met with Republican state officials from the region at Vandenberg Middle School.

== September ==
State or country	Areas visited	Dates	Details
Michigan	Ann Arbor	September 15	Spoke at Crisler Arena at the University of Michigan, from which Ford had graduated in 1935. Met with the Michigan Wolverines football team, on which Ford had been a star player, for a dinner at the Michigan Union.
Pennsylvania	Philadelphia	September 23–24	Participated in the first presidential debate against Georgia governor Jimmy Carter at the Walnut Street Theatre. Ford was the first sitting president to participate in a televised presidential debate. Attended a Republican reception at The Bellevue-Stratford Hotel (which was nearly empty at the time and would soon close because of the 1976 Philadelphia Legionnaires' disease outbreak). Stayed overnight at the Barclay House. Addressed the Polish American Congress at the Benjamin Franklin Hotel. Toured the Italian Market.
Louisiana	Lutcher	September 25	Boarded the SS Natchez at the Lutcher-Vacherie Ferry Landing.
Louisiana	Reserve	September 25	Spoke from aboard the SS Natchez.
Louisiana	Destrehan	September 25	Spoke from aboard the SS Natchez.
Louisiana	New Orleans	September 25–26	Arrived aboard the SS Natchez at Toulouse Street Wharf. Attended a Tulane Green Wave–Boston College Eagles football game at the Louisiana Superdome. Dined at Masson's Restaurant. Stayed at the Hyatt Regency New Orleans. Attended service at the St. Louis Cathedral.
Mississippi	Bay St. Louis	September 26	Spoke at Hancock County Public Library.
Mississippi	Gulfport	September 26	Spoke at the Main Post Office.
Mississippi	Biloxi	September 26	Ate at Fisherman's Wharf Restaurant. Spoke at the Mavar's Shrimp and Oyster Company pier.
Mississippi	Pascagoula	September 26	Spoke at Beach Park.
Alabama	Mobile	September 26	Spoke at Bates Field.
Florida	Miami	September 26–27	Stayed at the Marriott hotel.
Florida	Miami Beach	September 27	Addressed the International Association of Chiefs of Police conference at the Fontainebleau Miami Beach.
Florida	North Miami	September 27	Toured the Villa Maria Nursing and Retirement Center.

== October ==
State or country	Areas visited	Dates	Details
California	San Francisco	October 4–7	Stayed at the home of John Sutro Sr. in Pacific Heights. Participated in the second presidential debate against Jimmy Carter at the Palace of Fine Arts. Attended a debate watch party reception at the St. Francis Hotel.
California	Hawthorne	October 7	Toured Rockwell International's B-1 Lancer test facility.
California	Los Angeles	October 7	Interviewed by Mayor Sam Yorty on behalf of KCOP-TV at Doheny Library. Gave a convocation speech to first-time voters at the University of Southern California's Alumni Park.
California	Beverly Hills	October 7	Attended Republican fundraisers at The Beverly Hilton.
California	Universal City	October 7–8	Stayed at the Sheraton Universal Hotel. Addressed the San Fernando Valley Business and Professional Association at the hotel's Roof Garden.
California	Glendale	October 8	Met with local Mexican American leaders at the Casa Adobe de San Rafael. Attended the Days of the Verdugos Festival at Glendale City Hall.
Oklahoma	Lawton	October 8–9	Signed a proclamation designating Native American Awareness Week in a ceremony at the Montego Bay Motel, where he stayed overnight.
Texas	Dallas	October 9–10	Opened the State Fair of Texas. Attended a Texas Longhorns–Oklahoma Sooners football game at the Cotton Bowl. Attended a campaign reception at the Apparel Mart. Stayed at the Airport Marina Hotel. Attended service at First Baptist Church Dallas.
New York	New York	October 12–13	Met with local Jewish leaders at the Yeshivah of Flatbush. Toured the Sloan-Kettering Institute for Cancer Research. Attended a Republican reception at the New York Hilton, where he stayed overnight.
New York	Yonkers	October 13	Signed the State and Local Fiscal Assistance Amendments of 1976 in a ceremony at Yonkers City Hall.
New York	White Plains	October 13	Spoke at White Plains City Hall.
New York	New City	October 13	Spoke at the Rockland County Courthouse and Dutch Gardens.
New Jersey	Paramus	October 13	Spoke at Garden State Plaza.
New Jersey	Union	October 13	Toured Liberty Hall. Attended a campaign reception at the Town and Campus Inn.
Iowa	Ames	October 15	Spoke at Iowa State University's Fisher Theatre. Toured a local family farm. Signed legislation extending the Emergency Livestock Credit Act in a ceremony at the Iowa State University College of Veterinary Medicine.
Illinois	Joliet	October 15–16	Stayed at the Sheraton Motor Inn. Boarded the Honest Abe for a whistle-stop train tour beginning at Joliet Union Station.
Illinois	Pontiac	October 16	Spoke from the rear platform of the Honest Abe at Pontiac station.
Illinois	Bloomington	October 16	Spoke from the rear platform of the Honest Abe at Bloomington Union Depot.
Illinois	Lincoln	October 16	Spoke from the rear platform of the Honest Abe at Lincoln station. Attended a luncheon for Illinois news media leaders at the Hotel Lincoln before returning to the train.
Illinois	Springfield	October 16	Spoke from the rear platform of the Honest Abe at Springfield station.
Illinois	Carlinville	October 16	Spoke from the rear platform of the Honest Abe at Carlinville station.
Illinois	Alton	October 16	Arrived aboard the Honest Abe at Alton station.
Missouri	St. Louis	October 16	Spoke at Northwest Plaza. Attended a campaign reception at the Rockwell International facility.
New York	New York	October 21	Attended the Alfred E. Smith Memorial Foundation Dinner at the Waldorf Astoria New York.
Virginia	Williamsburg	October 22	Visited Lightfoot House at Colonial Williamsburg. Participated in the third presidential debate against Jimmy Carter at the College of William & Mary's Phi Beta Kappa Memorial Hall.
Virginia	Richmond	October 22–23	Stayed at the Virginia Executive Mansion. Spoke at the Virginia State Capitol.
North Carolina	Raleigh	October 23	Attended the North Carolina State Fair. Spoke at Dorton Arena.
South Carolina	Columbia	October 23	Attended a South Carolina Gamecocks–Notre Dame Fighting Irish football game at Williams–Brice Stadium. Attended the South Carolina State Fair. Spoke at the South Carolina Governor's Mansion.
California	Pasadena	October 23–24	Stayed at the Huntington-Sheraton Inn, where he attended a campaign reception.
California	San Gabriel	October 24	Attended service at the Mission San Gabriel Arcángel.
California	Fountain Valley	October 24	Held a campaign rally at the Fountain Valley Recreation Center.
California	Los Angeles	October 24	Interviewed at KABC-TV studios.
California	La Mesa	October 24	Held a campaign rally at The Broadway store at Grossmont Center.
California	San Diego	October 24–25	Stayed at the Little America Westgate Plaza Hotel.
Washington	Seattle	October 25	Toured the Todd Shipyard. Held a campaign rally at Pier 57. Toured the Veterans Administration Hospital, where he planted a tree in observance of the upcoming Veterans Day.
Oregon	Portland	October 25	Addressed the National Association of Broadcasters regional meeting at the Sheraton-Portland Hotel.
Pennsylvania	Pittsburgh	October 26	Addressed the Economic Club of Pittsburgh at the Pittsburgh Hilton.
Pennsylvania	Aliquippa	October 26	Toured the Jones and Laughlin Steel Company plant.
Illinois	Chicago	October 26	Spoke at Ford City Mall. Interviewed at WLS-TV studios.
Illinois	Northbrook	October 26	Spoke at Allstate Plaza.
Illinois	Schaumburg	October 26	Spoke at Woodfield Mall.
Illinois	Arlington Heights	October 26–27	Stayed at the Arlington Park Hilton.
New Jersey	Atlantic City	October 27	Held a campaign rally in front of the Haddon Hall Hotel, then addressed the New Jersey School Boards Association inside.
Pennsylvania	Villanova	October 27	Spoke at Villanova University.
Pennsylvania	Philadelphia	October 27	Visited the home of John Cardinal Krol. Interviewed at WPVI-TV studios. Attended a Republican fundraiser at the Philadelphia Civic Center.
Pennsylvania	Plymouth Meeting	October 27	Held a campaign rally at Plymouth Meeting Mall.
Pennsylvania	Devon	October 27	Held a campaign rally at the Valley Forge Music Fair.
Pennsylvania	Philadelphia	October 27–28	Stayed at the Sheraton Airport Inn.
Indiana	Indianapolis	October 28	Attended a campaign reception at the Scottish Rite Cathedral.
Ohio	Cincinnati	October 28	Held a campaign rally in Fountain Square.
Ohio	Cleveland	October 28–29	Interviewed at WJW-TV studios. Attended a fundraiser for Senator Robert Taft Jr. at Karlin Hall. Attended the Sun Newspapers Good Neighbor Awards Banquet at the Cleveland Marriott, where he stayed overnight.
Wisconsin	Milwaukee	October 29	Addressed the Wisconsin Education Association Council meeting at the Milwaukee Auditorium. Attended a campaign reception at the Marc Plaza Hotel.
Missouri	St. Louis	October 29	Held a campaign rally at Luther Ely Smith Memorial Park.
Texas	Baytown	October 29	Attended a Robert E. Lee Ganders–Aldine-McArthur Generals high school football game at Stallworth Stadium.
Texas	Houston	October 29–30	Stayed at the Marriott Hotel. Held a campaign rally in front of the Houston Music Theatre. Interviewed at KTRK-TV studios.
Pennsylvania	Langhorne	October 30	Held a campaign rally at Oxford Valley Mall.
New York	Syracuse	October 30	Held a campaign rally at Onondaga County War Memorial Auditorium.
New York	Buffalo	October 30–31	Stayed at the Statler Hilton, where he attended a campaign fundraiser. Attended service at Church of St. Stanislaus, Bishop and Martyr.
New York	Rochester	October 31	Held a campaign rally at Monroe County Airport.
New York	Hauppauge	October 31	Held a campaign rally at Colonie Hill Motel.
New York	Hempstead	October 31	Held a campaign rally at the Nassau Veterans Memorial Coliseum.
Ohio	Canton	October 31–November 1	Stayed at the Sheraton Belden Inn.

== November ==
State or country	Areas visited	Dates	Details
Ohio	Green	November 1	Held a campaign rally at Akron–Canton Airport.
Ohio	Columbus	November 1	Held a campaign rally at the Ohio Statehouse. Toured the Fort Hayes Career Center.
Michigan	Livonia	November 1	Held a campaign rally at Wonderland Village.
Michigan	Grand Rapids	November 1–2	Dedicated the Gerald R. Ford Health and Physical Education Building at Grand Rapids Junior College. Stayed at the Pantlind Hotel. Voted in the 1976 United States presidential election at Wealthy Elementary School. Ate at Granny's Kitchen Restaurant. Attended an unveiling ceremony for a mural of Ford at the Kent County Airport.
California	Rancho Mirage	November 7–15	Vacation. Stayed at the home of Leonard Firestone, Ford's ambassador to Belgium.

== December 1976–January 1977 ==
State or country	Areas visited	Dates	Details
Michigan	Ann Arbor	December 19	Met with University of Michigan regents at the Michigan League building to plan the Gerald R. Ford Presidential Library. Gave the University of Michigan commencement address at Crisler Arena.
Colorado	Vail	December 19–January 2	Christmas vacation at the home of Richard Bass.
