= Springfield-Sangamon Transportation Center =

Springfield-Sangamon, IL

General information
- Location: 9th Street and Adams Street; Springfield, Illinois; United States
- Coordinates: 39.8010°N 89.6423°W
- Line: Norfolk Southern Railway
- Connections: SMTD

Construction
- Accessible: yes

History
- Opening: 2027

Future services
| Preceding station | Amtrak | Following station |
|---|---|---|
| Carlinville toward St. Louis | Lincoln Service | Lincoln toward Chicago |
| Carlinville toward Los Angeles or San Antonio | Texas Eagle | Lincoln toward Chicago |
Location

Springfield-Sangamon Transportation Center is a planned intermodal transit station in Springfield, Illinois, that will serve Amtrak trains, intercity buses, and Sangamon Mass Transit District bus and paratransit services. The station is under construction at 9th and Adams Street in Springfield, just north of the Sangamon County Courthouse. Groundbreaking took place in October 2021. The Springfield Rail Improvements Project expects construction to be complete in 2027.

== Description ==
Construction of the new Transportation Center is part of the "Springfield Rail Improvements Project". The $122 million project will re-route all passenger and freight railroad operations away from the historic Chicago and Alton right-of-way, which is street running in parts of Springfield. The train traffic, including Amtrak, will be re-routed onto a non-street-running right-of-way operated by the Norfolk Southern Railway. The new Springfield train station will serve trains on the new route. In 2021, the projected cost of the transportation center rose from $80 million to $86 million.

The new Center will follow the current paradigm of consolidating sites of major passenger train service together with motorbus hubs in a location with a motor vehicle parking lot or garage. The Bloomington-Normal Amtrak station, completed in 2012 on the same Amtrak route, already follows this paradigm. The new Center will be constructed in compliance with guidelines established under the Americans With Disabilities Act. Groundbreaking took place in October 2021, by which time the tentative completion date had been delayed from 2024 until 2025.

== History ==
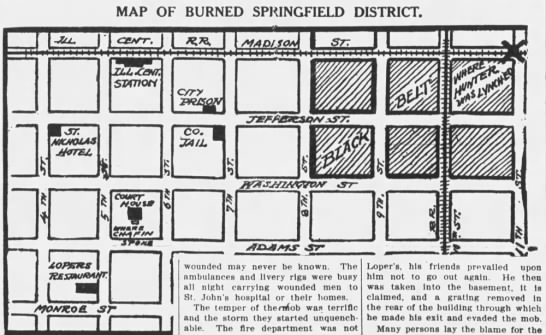
The McHenry Plaindealer. Map of 1908 targeted neighborhood. The Wabash railroad is the vertical black line on the right.

The new Center's railroad right-of-way uses a right-of-way formerly used by the Wabash Railroad. The railroad's former Lincoln Depot, one block south of the new intermodal station, is preserved as the site of the departure of Abraham Lincoln for Washington, D.C., on February 11, 1861, and the site of Abraham Lincoln's farewell address. After the enactment of the Thirteenth Amendment in 1865, many Americans of African ancestry found work in the nation's fast-growing railroad industry, including on the Wabash. The streetscapes near the Wabash became Springfield neighborhoods of predominantly African-American identity until 1908, when they were targeted in the Springfield Race Riot of 1908. The streets around the Transportation Center were a focus and target of the rioters; and the center is being designed so as to contain an exhibit and memorial, intended to be permanent, to remember the tragic event.

Construction of the new station will entail abandonment by Amtrak of their current passenger depot. The current station was opened for service by the Chicago and Alton in 1895.

February 2007 estimates of the cost of construction of the transportation center project had ranged from $13 million to $18 million, but this was a decrease from an even earlier estimate of $50 million.

== See also ==
• Springfield station (Illinois)
