= Springfield station =

Springfield station may refer to:

== Australia ==
- Springfield Central railway station, a train station in Queensland
- Springfield railway station, Ipswich, a train station in Queensland

== New Zealand ==
- Springfield railway station, New Zealand, a train station on the South Island

== United Kingdom ==
- Springfield railway station (Scotland), a train station in Fife
- Springfield railway station (ALR), a station on the former Ashover Light Railway in Derbyshire

== United States ==
- Eugene–Springfield station, a train station in Oregon
- Franconia–Springfield station, a train station in Virginia
- Springfield station (Illinois), a train station in Illinois
  - Springfield-Sangamon Transportation Center, its under-construction replacement
- Springfield Union Station (Illinois), a former train station in Illinois
- Springfield Union Station (Massachusetts), a train and bus station in Massachusetts
- The original name of Springfield Gardens station, a former train station in New York City
- A predecessor of Higbie Avenue station, a former train station in New York City
