= Uptown Station =

Intermodal transportation center in Normal, Illinois

Uptown Station Bloomington–Normal, IL
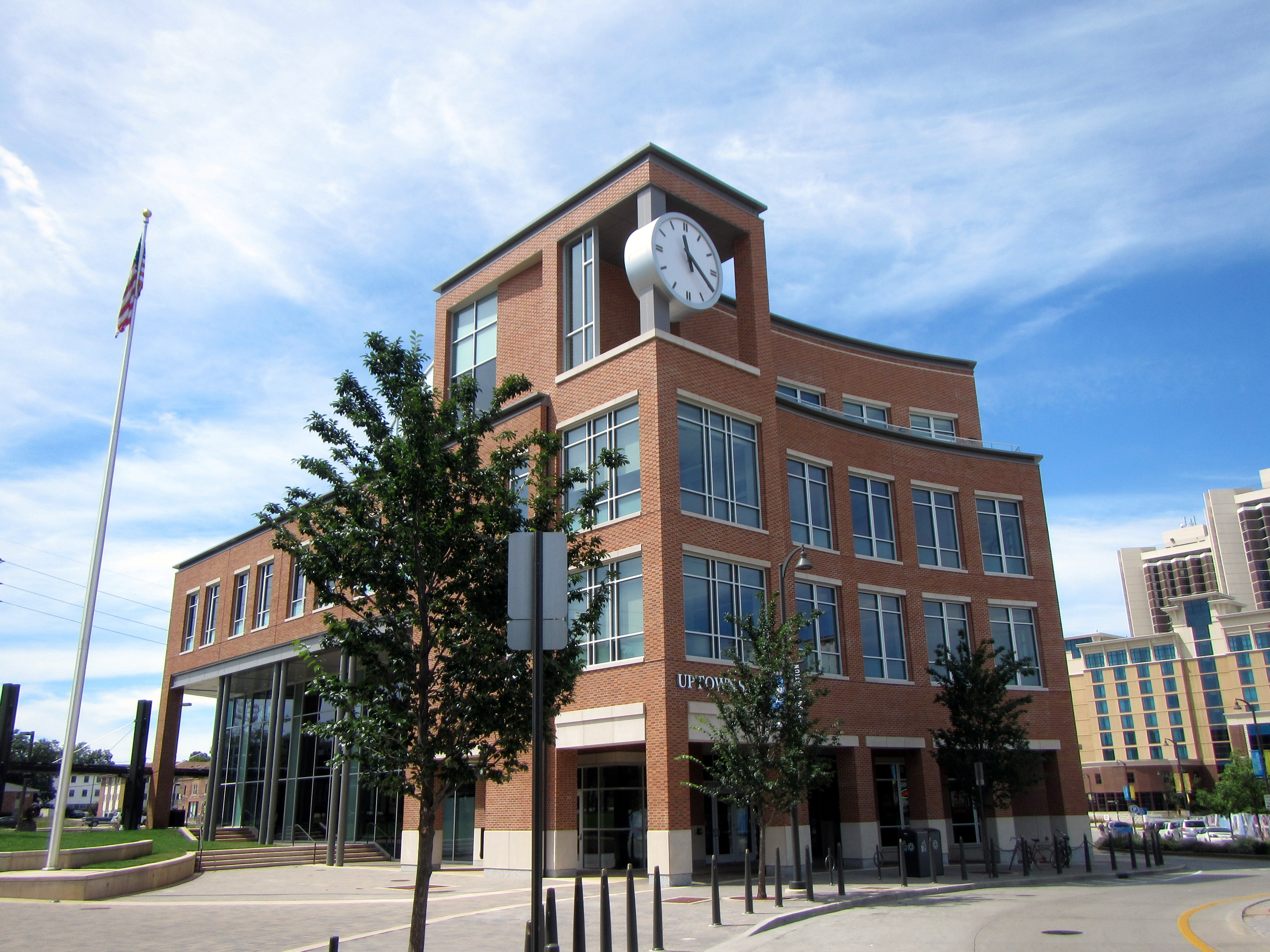

General information
- Location: 11 Uptown Circle; Normal, Illinois; United States
- Coordinates: 40°30′31″N 88°59′03″W
- Owner: Town of Normal
- Line: UP Joliet Subdivision
- Platforms: 2 side platforms
- Tracks: 2
- Connections: Amtrak Thruway; Connect Transit; Greyhound Lines; Flix Bus; Jefferson Lines; Peoria Charter

Construction
- Parking: 380 spaces
- Accessible: Yes
- Architect: Ratio Architects
- Architectural style: Four-story red brick structure with limestone lintels and doorways

Other information
- Station code: Amtrak: BNL

History
- Opened: 1990
- Rebuilt: 2012

Passengers
- FY 2025: 230,448 (Amtrak)

Services
Preceding station	Amtrak	Following station
Lincoln toward St. Louis	Lincoln Service	Pontiac toward Chicago
Lincoln toward Los Angeles or San Antonio	Texas Eagle	Pontiac toward Chicago
Former services
At Normal
Preceding station	Amtrak	Following station
Lincoln toward Laredo or Houston	Inter-American	Pontiac toward Chicago
Lincoln toward Springfield	Loop	Pontiac toward Chicago
Preceding station	Alton Railroad	Following station
Bloomington toward St. Louis	Main Line	Towanda toward Chicago
Preceding station	Illinois Central Railroad	Following station
Panola toward Freeport	Freeport – Centralia	Colonial toward Centralia
At Bloomington
Preceding station	Alton Railroad	Following station
Shirley toward St. Louis	Main Line	Normal toward Chicago
Location

Uptown Station is an intermodal transportation center in Normal, Illinois, United States. It is served by Amtrak, the national railroad passenger system, and is the major intercity rail station in north-central Illinois. It appears on Amtrak timetables as Bloomington–Normal.

Amtrak runs two routes through the station–the Lincoln Service and the Texas Eagle. This was also a stop for the Ann Rutledge until April 2007. Amtrak Thruway motorcoach routes serve the station via Davenport, Galesburg, Peoria, Champaign–Urbana, and Indianapolis.

In 2022, 178,018 train passengers boarded or alighted from Amtrak trains at Uptown Station, making it the second busiest Amtrak station in Illinois behind Chicago. This is primarily due to the large number of passengers traveling to and from Chicago and St. Louis. In 2019 Uptown station was the 44th busiest Amtrak station in the United States with 229,894 passengers.

== Former facilities ==
=== Union Depot ===
The original station serving Bloomington-Normal was Bloomington Union Depot. This station was located on Bloomington's west side, just south of West Washington Street and on the west side of the Chicago & Alton Railroad tracks. It had been constructed in the mid-1880s, and survived well into the Amtrak era because Bloomington-Normal is located along the most direct route from Chicago to St. Louis. The station was closed on June 10, 1990, to be replaced by a much smaller facility in Normal. Seven years later, on October 31, 1997, a then-partially demolished Union Station was destroyed by fire.

=== 1990 Amtrak facility ===
The original Normal station was built to the specifications of the Amtrak Standard Stations Program. Located near the campus of Illinois State University, this station lasted until the new facility opened in 2012.

== New facility ==
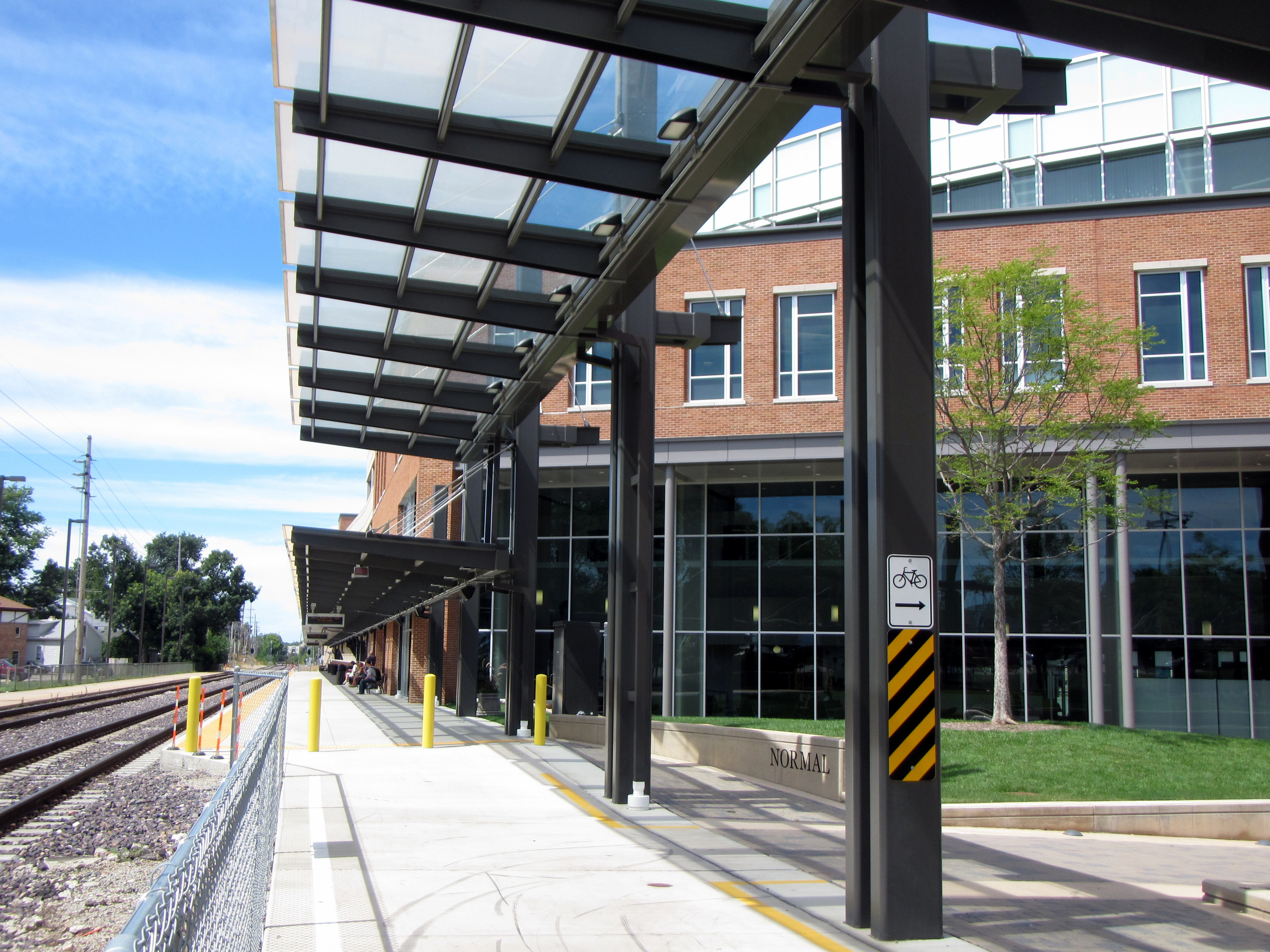
Amtrak Bloomington–Normal station platform

On August 7, 2010, construction began on a new intermodal facility, located across the tracks from the 1990 facility. The new facility includes administrative offices and council chambers for the town in addition to serving Amtrak, city and long-distance buses. The facility opened on June 14, 2012. Construction, which cost between $43 and $47 million, was funded by a combination of federal, state and local grants.

The new 68,000-square-foot (6,300 m^{2}) transportation center was designed by Ratio Architects of Champaign; it is composed primarily of red brick with limestone trim. The building's prominent corner clock tower has become a landmark for the neighborhood. Numerous environmentally sustainable features are also included, such as a green roof partially planted in vegetation that will absorb rainwater and cool the building; the rest of the roof is covered in reflective materials to deflect sunlight.

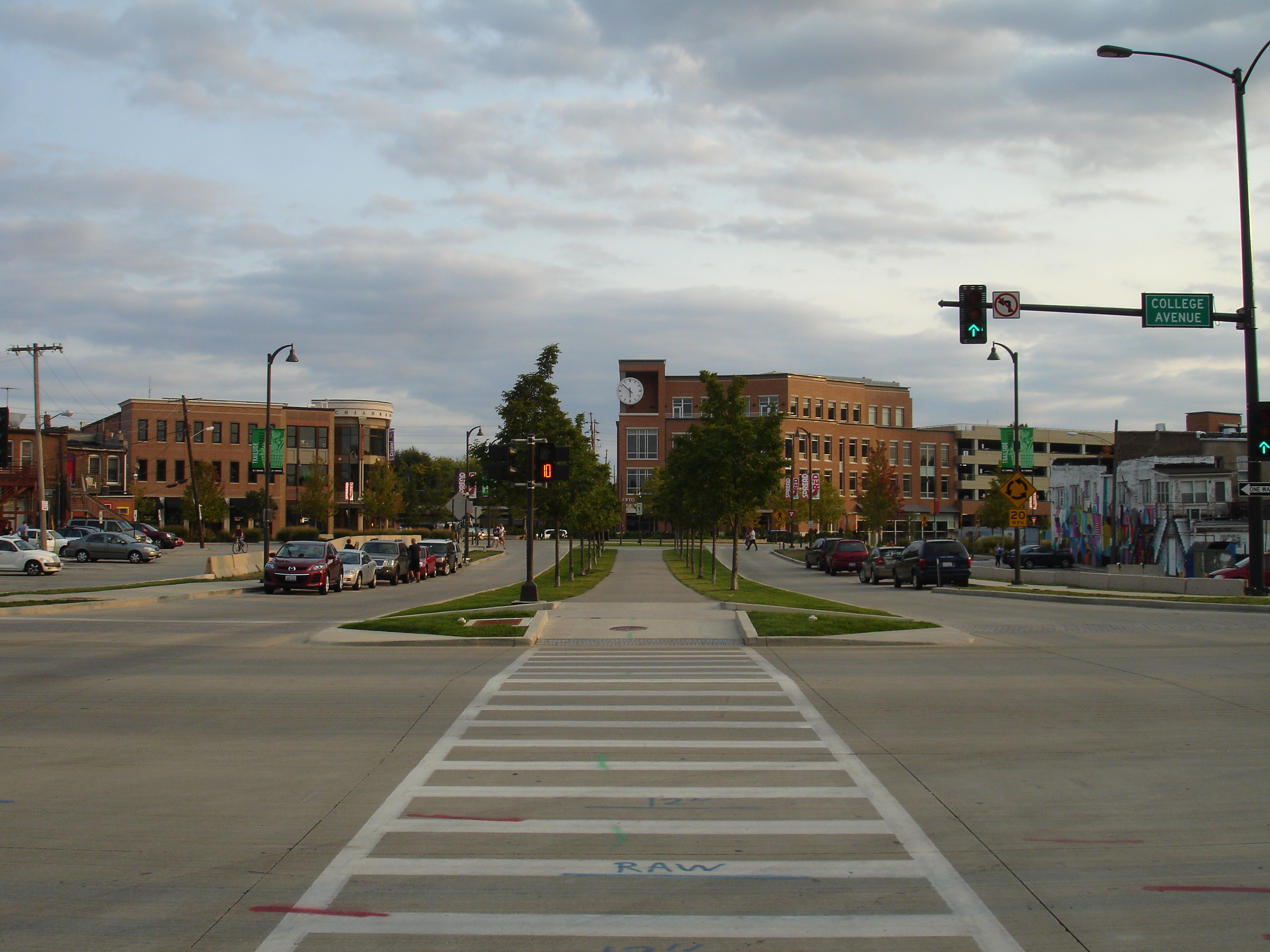
Construction of the Uptown Connector underpass will allow the Constitution Trail (pictured) to run under the railroad tracks.

On November 3, 2025, the Normal Town Council narrowly approved the construction of a $32 million pedestrian underpass, known as the Uptown Connector, that will link the Mark R. Peterson Plaza to the area south of the tracks. It will allow for an easier and safer passage for passengers to connect between Track 1 (north platform) and Track 2 (south platform). Construction was initially expected to be completed in 2027, but has since been pushed back to June 2028, with the total cost now being $42.8 million.

== Connections ==
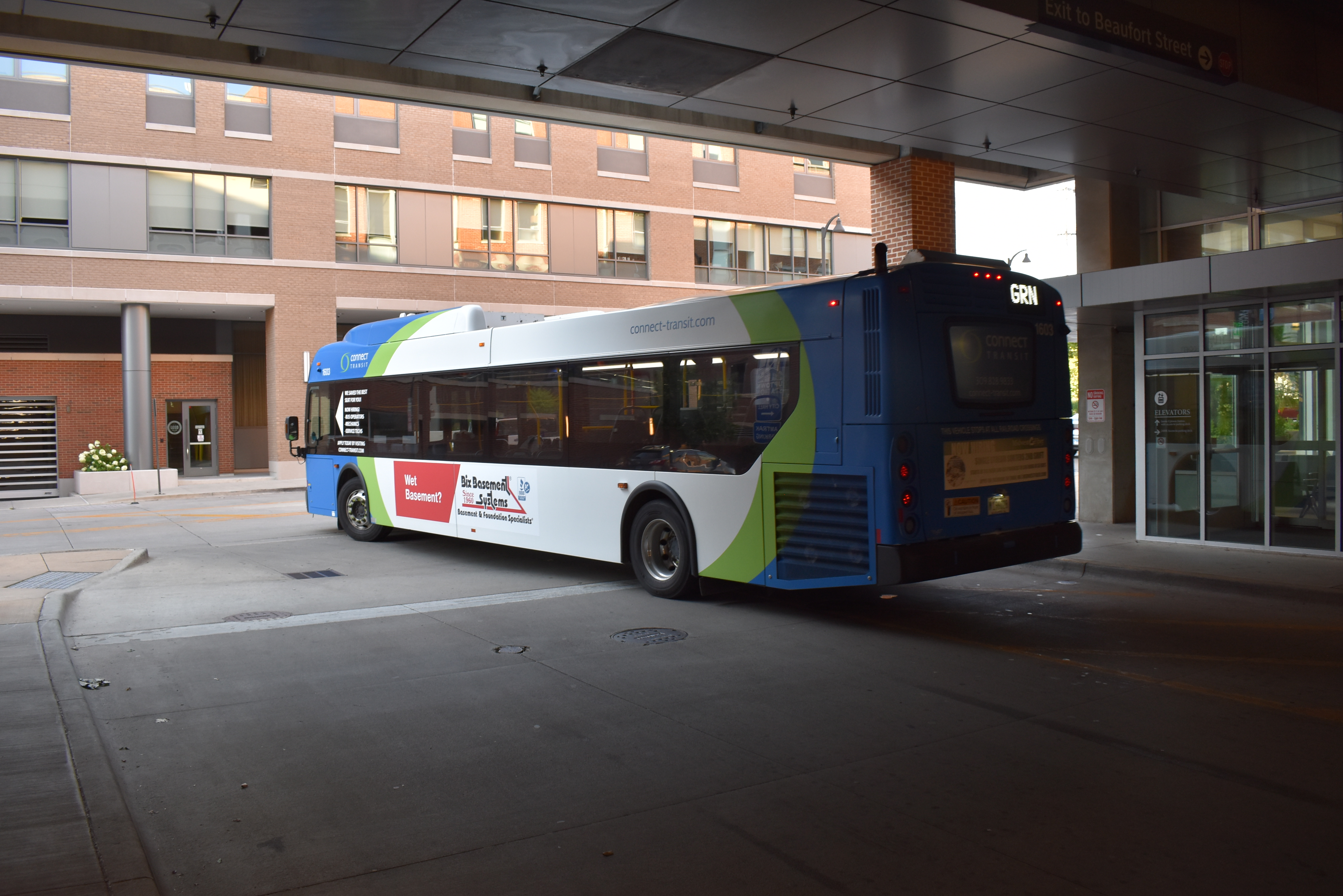
Uptown Station is a major hub for Connect Transit buses.

=== Local Bus Service ===
- Connect Transit
  - Red, Yellow, Lime, Tan, Brown, Green, and Pink each have a terminus at Uptown Station
  - The Tan Route provides a direct connection to Central Illinois Regional Airport

SHOW BUS ceased operations in McLean County in July 2025 and was replaced by Connect GO.

=== Intercity Bus Service ===
- Jefferson Lines
  - Indianapolis, IN to Denver, CO via Burlington, IA; Des Moines, IA; and Omaha, NE
- Greyhound Lines
  - Danville, IL to Chicago, IL via Champaign, IL and Rockford, IL
- Peoria Charter Coach Company
  - Peoria, IL – Chicago O'Hare International Airport
- FlixBus

On July 2, 2024, Illinois Gov. JB Pritzker announced that the Illinois Department of Transportation (IDOT) was awarded a $1.2 million federal RAISE grant to conduct a feasibility study of an express bus between Bloomington–Normal and Peoria. Uptown Station is considered a likely stop as it would allow connections to Amtrak and Connect Transit. The study will commence in late 2025 and is expected to conclude in 2027.
