= Lincoln Service =

Amtrak service between Chicago, IL and St. Louis, MO

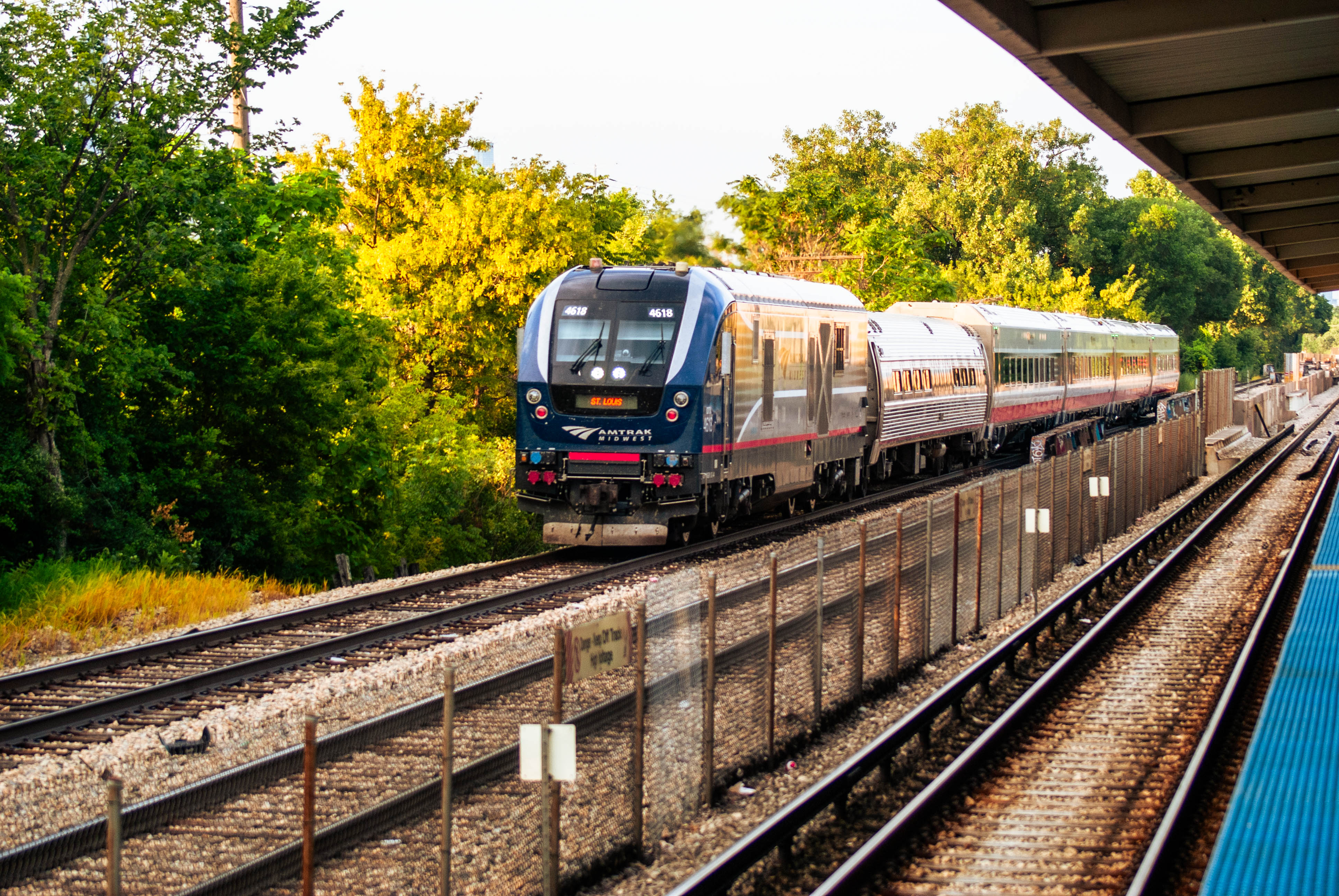
- A Lincoln Service train in Chicago in 2023

Overview
- Service type: Higher-speed rail
- Status: Operating
- Locale: Midwest United States
- Predecessor: State House, Loop
- First service: October 30, 2006
- Current operator: Amtrak
- Annual ridership: 592,735 (FY 25) ▲1.1% (Note: Amtrak's Fiscal Year (FY) runs from October 1 of the prior year to September 30 of the named year.)

Route
- Termini: Chicago, Illinois; St. Louis, Missouri
- Stops: 9
- Distance travelled: 284 miles (457 km)
- Average journey time: 4 hours, 59 minutes
- Service frequency: Four daily round trips
- Train numbers: 300–302, 305–307 (CHI–STL); 318–319 (CHI–KCY)

On-board services
- Classes: Coach Class; Business Class
- Catering facilities: Café
- Baggage facilities: Overhead racks

Technical
- Rolling stock: Amfleet; Siemens Venture; Siemens Charger
- Track gauge: 4 ft 8 1/2 in (1,435 mm) standard gauge
- Operating speed: 57 miles per hour (92 km/h) average 110 miles per hour (180 km/h) top
- Track owners: CN, UP, NS, CPKC, TRRA

The Lincoln Service is a 284-mile (457 km) higher-speed rail service operated by Amtrak that runs between Chicago, Illinois and St. Louis, Missouri. The train is a part of the Illinois Service and is partially funded by the Illinois Department of Transportation. The train uses the same route as the long-distance Texas Eagle, which continues to San Antonio and Los Angeles. A connection with the Kansas City-bound Missouri River Runner is available in St. Louis.

As of June 2023, the average trip time between Chicago and St. Louis was 4 hours 59 minutes.

During fiscal year 2023, the Lincoln Service trains carried 523,304 passengers, an increase of 9.9% from FY2022. This is a 16.7% decrease from pre-COVID-19 pandemic ridership, with 627,599 passengers in FY2019. In FY2016, the service had a total revenue of $14,266,964, a decrease of 1.3% from FY2015.

== History ==
Prior to the Lincoln Service, Amtrak had operated the daily State House train between Chicago and St. Louis since 1973. Originally intended to connect Chicago and Springfield, Amtrak extended the State House south to St. Louis at its own expense because Springfield station was not designed to turn equipment. The train used a route previously owned by the Alton Railroad, which had merged with the Gulf, Mobile and Ohio Railroad (GM&O) in 1947. The GM&O merged with the Illinois Central Railroad in 1972, a year after Amtrak took over passenger train service.

On October 30, 2006, Amtrak rebranded the State House as the Lincoln Service upon the addition of two new round trips, made possible by upgrades to the line. This resulted in a total of five daily round trips on the Chicago-St. Louis corridor, including the Texas Eagle and Ann Rutledge, which terminated beyond St. Louis. Beginning in April 2007, the Ann Rutledge operated only between Kansas City and St. Louis, where it connected once daily to the Lincoln Service. The Ann Rutledge was folded into the Missouri River Runner in 2009, though one Lincoln Service round trip continued to connect with the Missouri River Runner. On May 23, 2022, Amtrak replaced trains 303 and 304 with a through-routing one round trip of the Missouri River Runner and Lincoln Service via trains 318 and 319. This created a second one-seat service between Kansas City and Chicago (additional to the Southwest Chief, which takes a more direct route).

=== Track upgrades ===
In July 2010, the state of Illinois and the Union Pacific Railroad reached an agreement under which track speeds between Dwight and Alton, Illinois were to be raised to as high as 110 miles per hour (177 km/h). This speed will cut the travel time between Chicago and St. Louis by 90 minutes, bringing the trip to under four hours. The first track upgrade construction was planned to be between Alton and Lincoln, Illinois and was projected to cost $98 million. The construction on this stretch began on September 17, 2010, in Alton and was completed in 2011. Most of the funding came from $1.1 billion in stimulus money for Illinois high-speed rail from the American Recovery and Reinvestment Act of 2009. The remainder of this grant, as well as $400 million in funding from the state of Illinois, was used to complete a high-speed rail corridor for the remaining portions of the St. Louis–Chicago track. Senator Dick Durbin suggested the Dwight–Alton upgrades would create some 900 jobs, while the overall project could generate 24,000.

On March 22, 2011, an announcement was made in Chicago that an additional $685 million would be used to upgrade trackage and grade crossings between Dwight and Lincoln. Construction on the improvement project began on April 5, 2011. Upgrades included rebuilding the passing sidings so that the track spacing between the main track is increased from 14 ft (4.3 m) to 20 ft (6.1 m).

Although much of track upgrade work was completed between 2010 and 2012, there are additional constructions including second trackage, bridge replacement and rehabilitation, drainage improvements, and grade crossings and signal improvements before the full 110-mile-per-hour (177 km/h) service can be fully operated on this route. After all required improvements on the first 15-mile (24 km) segment between Dwight and Pontiac, Illinois were completed, Amtrak started the higher-speed rail service with top speeds of 110 miles per hour (177 km/h) on that segment in November 2012, with the entire section between Alton and Joliet expected to have 110-mile-per-hour (177 km/h) operation by 2017.

Starting on July 7, 2021, Lincoln Service and Texas Eagle trains were allowed a top speed of 90 miles per hour (140 km/h) after Federal Railroad Administration dual certification of the Incremental Train Control System and Interoperable Electronic Train Management System between south of Joliet Union Station and Alton, Illinois. On December 13, 2021, scheduled travel times were reduced by approximately 15 minutes between St. Louis and Chicago as a result of the increased speeds. Amtrak began testing in 2022 for 110 mph (177 km/h) revenue service, which began on May 3, 2023. New schedules debuted on June 26, 2023. By September 2025, schedules were 34 minutes faster than pre-2021.

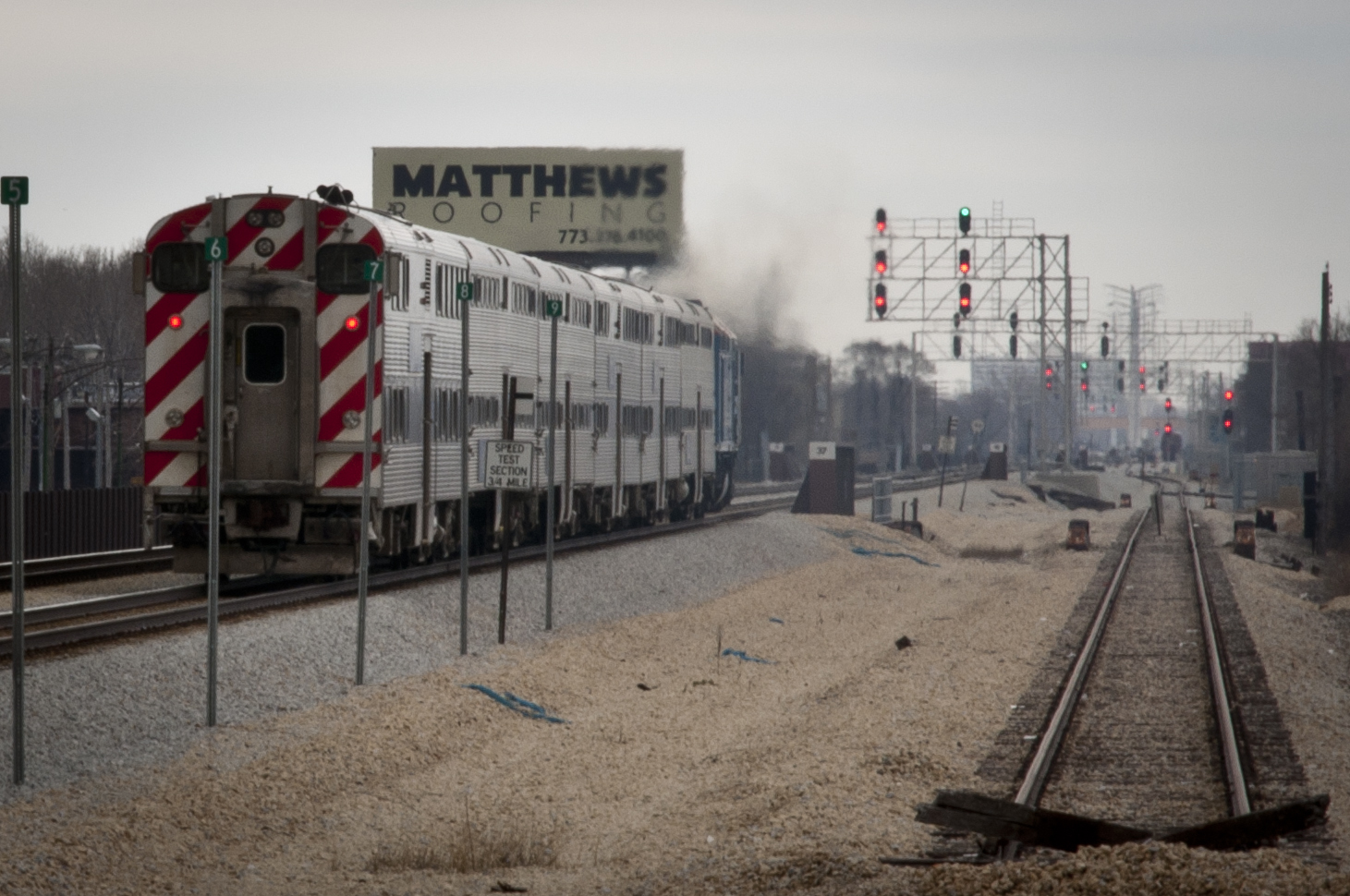
Location of the new third main line currently under construction in Metra's Rock Island District to increase its capacity, in anticipation that the corridor will accommodate not only Amtrak’s Texas Eagle and Lincoln Services, but also the SouthWest Service (SWS), which is also operated by Metra

The slowest portion of the corridor is the segment between Chicago and Joliet (CN Joliet Subdivision), but improving this would require an additional $1.5 billion investment. Two projects proposed from the Chicago Region Environmental and Transportation Efficiency Program (CREATE) would remove two diamond crossings and construct an overpass to increase train speed and eliminate delays. One project is in the preliminary design phase while the proposed flyover at Brighton Park crossing is unfunded. As of 2022, an alternative solution rerouting trains via the Rock Island District, which bypasses these diamond crossings and has relatively few freight trains, is being considered. This option would reduce delays and allow higher speeds between Joliet and Chicago. The heavy freight traffic on the Joliet Sub causes frequent delays to Amtrak trains, and the option to reroute the Texas Eagle and Lincoln Service through the Rock Island District is Amtrak's preferred choice and has been approved by the Federal Railroad Administration (FRA). However, for Amtrak trains to operate through the Rock Island District, modifications would be required in Joliet and Chicago. A third platform would need to be constructed at Joliet Gateway Center, and Amtrak would have to improve the current connection via the St. Charles Air Line between the RID and Union Station. The current connection sees occasional use during maintenance and emergencies, but it limits trains to a maximum speed of 5 mph (8 km/h) and requires trains to reverse into Union Station.

The FRA and the Illinois Department of Transportation are conducting studies and environmental reviews to add a second track between Elwood, IL and Braidwood, IL, which is located between the Joliet and Dwight stations. On December 15, 2025, the FRA released a Finding of No Significant Impact (FONSI) report on the project. Construction is expected in 2028-2029, pending funding.

== Operation ==
=== Equipment ===
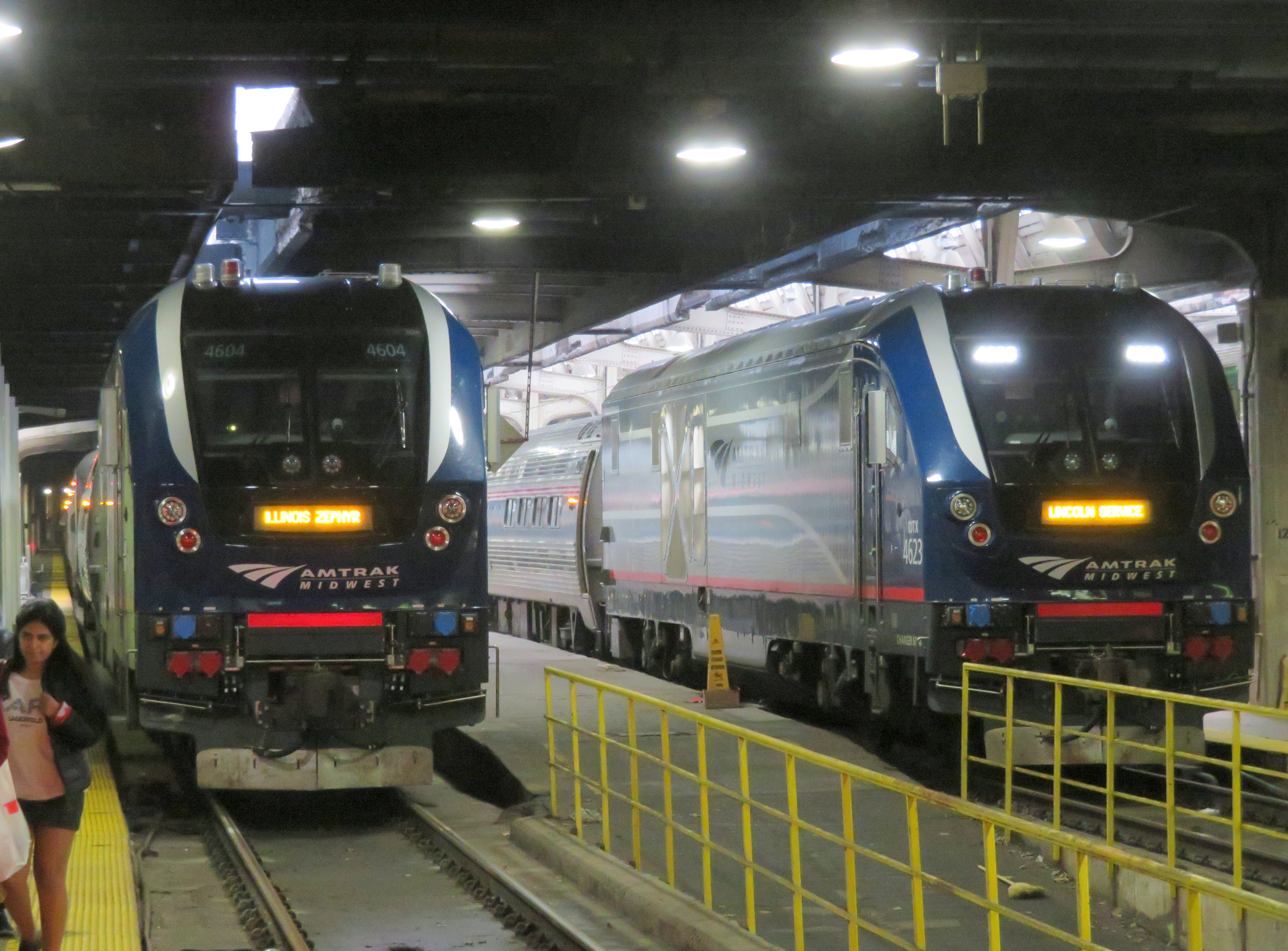
Illinois Zephyr (left) and Lincoln Service trains at Chicago Union Station in 2018

A Lincoln Service train consists of the following:

- One or two Siemens SC-44 locomotives
- Three to seven Amfleet or Venture coaches
- One Amfleet cafe/business car

=== Route ===
Geographic map of route

The Metra Heritage Corridor commuter line uses the same route from Joliet to Union Station.

One daily Lincoln Service round trip (train 318/319) is coupled with the Missouri River Runner at St. Louis, providing a one-seat ride between Chicago and Kansas City. Additionally, one southbound Lincoln Service (train 301) runs express to St. Louis with stops only at Joliet, Bloomington-Normal, Springfield, and Alton.

=== Stations ===
State	Town/City	Station	Connections
Illinois	Chicago	Chicago; Union Station	Amtrak (long-distance): California Zephyr, Cardinal, City of New Orleans, Empire Builder, Floridian, Lake Shore Limited, Southwest Chief, Texas Eagle; Amtrak (intercity): Blue Water, Borealis, Hiawatha, Illini and Saluki, Illinois Zephyr and Carl Sandburg, Pere Marquette, Wolverine; Metra: BNSF, Heritage Corridor, Milwaukee District North, Milwaukee District West, North Central Service, SouthWest Service; Chicago "L": Blue (at Clinton), Brown Orange Pink Purple (at Quincy); CTA Bus: 1 7 J14 19 28 56 60 120 121 124 125 126 128 130 151 156 157 192; Pace Bus: 755 Plainfield–IMD–West Loop Express; Amtrak Thruway, Megabus, Greyhound, Peoria Charter
Illinois	Summit	Summit	Metra: Heritage Corridor; Pace Bus: 330
Illinois	Joliet	Joliet; Transportation; Center	Amtrak: Texas Eagle; Metra: Heritage Corridor, Rock Island; Pace Bus: 501, 504, 505, 507, 508, 509, 511, 832, 834
Illinois	Dwight	Dwight	
Illinois	Pontiac	Pontiac	Amtrak: Texas Eagle
Illinois	Normal	Bloomington–Normal	Amtrak: Texas Eagle; Connect Transit: Green, Red/Exp, Lime, Brown, Tan, Pink, Yellow, Redbird Express, Sapphire; Burlington Trailways, Greyhound, Peoria Charter
Illinois	Lincoln	Lincoln	Amtrak: Texas Eagle
Illinois	Springfield	Springfield	Amtrak: Texas Eagle; SMTD: 4, 7, 12, 903
Illinois	Carlinville	Carlinville	Amtrak: Texas Eagle
Illinois	Alton	Alton	Amtrak: Texas Eagle; Madison County Transit: Route 11
Missouri	St. Louis	Gateway; Transportation; Center	Amtrak: Missouri River Runner, Texas Eagle; MetroLink: Red Blue Green (planned) (at Civic Center); MetroBus: 4, 10, 11, 19, 30, 31, 32, 40, 41, 73, 74, 94, 97; Madison County Transit: 1X, 5, 14X, 16X; Greyhound Lines, Amtrak Thruway

== See also ==
- Loop
