= SMTD =

SMTD may refer to:

- Sangamon Mass Transit District (SMTD), the public transit system of Springfield, Illinois, United States
- University of Michigan School of Music, Theatre & Dance (SMTD), an institution for the performing arts in the United States
- UNCG School of Music, Theater and Dance or SMTD, the former name of the College of Visual and Performing Arts, at the University of North Carolina at Greensboro
- Stockton Metropolitan Transit District (SMTD), original name of the San Joaquin Regional Transit District
