= State House (train) =

Former Amtrak service between Chicago, IL and St. Louis, MO

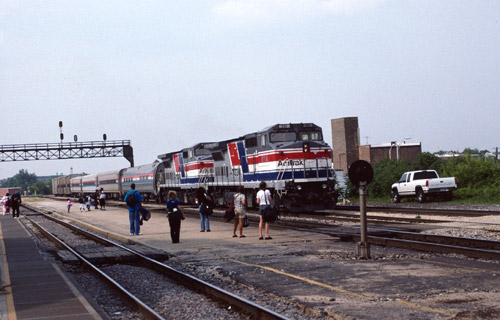
- Southbound State House at Joliet Union Station in 1999

Overview
- Service type: Inter-city rail
- Status: Discontinued
- Locale: Illinois/ St. Louis, Missouri
- First service: October 1, 1973
- Last service: October 30, 2006
- Successor: Lincoln Service
- Former operator: Amtrak

Route
- Termini: Chicago, Illinois; St. Louis, Missouri
- Stops: 9
- Distance travelled: 284 miles (457 km)
- Average journey time: 5 hours 30 minutes
- Service frequency: Daily
- Train numbers: 300, 302, 305, & 307

On-board services
- Classes: Business class; Reserved coach
- Catering facilities: On-board cafe

Technical
- Track gauge: 4 ft 8 1/2 in (1,435 mm)

The State House was a passenger train operated by Amtrak (the National Railroad Passenger Corporation) between Chicago, Illinois, and St. Louis, Missouri in the United States. This service began in 1973 and continued until 2006, when it was re-branded as the Lincoln Service as part of a three-fold service expansion over that route.

== History ==
The State House's existence is book-ended by two dramatic changes in the state of Illinois' passenger rail service. The State House made its first run on October 1, 1973, the same day that two French-built Turboliner trainsets replaced the conventional Abraham Lincoln and Prairie State on the Chicago—St. Louis corridor. This third round-trip was intended as a Chicago—Springfield route and received funding from the Illinois Department of Transportation. Amtrak decided to continue the train to St. Louis (at its own expense) via Carlinville and Alton because of the difficulty in turning the train in Springfield.

Over its 33-year history the State House stopped in Joliet, Pontiac, Lincoln, Springfield, Carlinville, Alton and St. Louis. Service to Bloomington ended on June 10, 1990, when operations moved to a new station up the tracks in Normal. Service to Dwight began October 26, 1986, and Summit on October 25, 1987.

From 1986 to 1996, the State House was complemented as far as Springfield by the Loop, which departed Chicago in the morning and returned in the afternoon.

Amtrak re-branded the State House as the Lincoln Service on October 30, 2006, as it and Illinois launched two additional round-trips over the same corridor.
