= Lincoln station (Illinois) =

Lincoln, IL
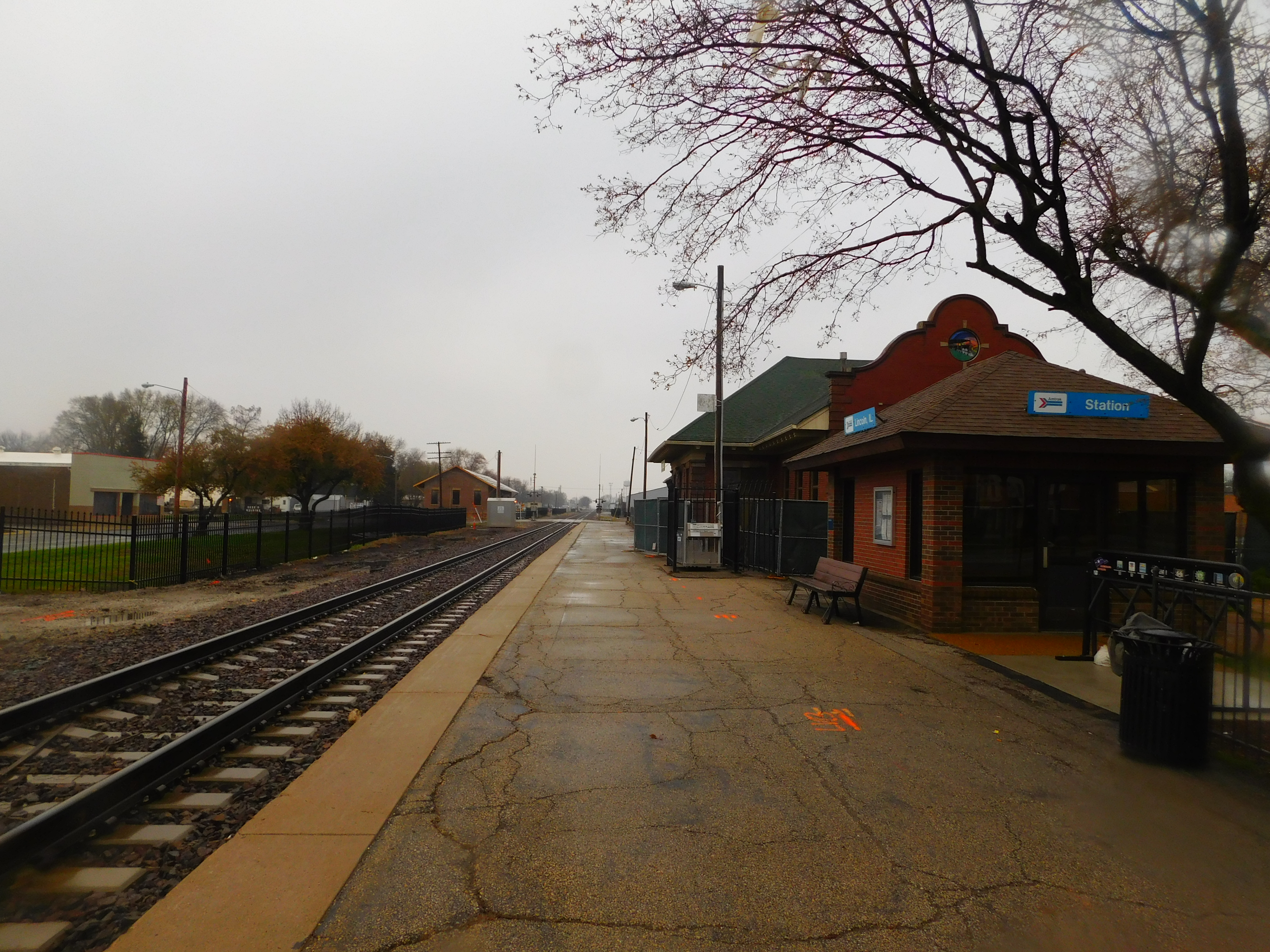
- The 1911 railroad depot in April 2016.

General information
- Location: 101 North Chicago Street; Lincoln, Illinois; United States
- Coordinates: 40.14748°N 89.36354°W
- Owner: State Bank of Lincoln in Trust
- Operator: Amtrak
- Line: Union Pacific Railroad
- Platforms: 1 side platform
- Tracks: 1
- Connections: SHOW Bus

Construction
- Parking: Yes
- Accessible: yes

Other information
- Station code: Amtrak: LCN

Passengers
- FY 2025: 18,239 (Amtrak)

Services
Preceding station	Amtrak	Following station
Springfield toward St. Louis	Lincoln Service	Bloomington–Normal toward Chicago
Springfield toward Los Angeles or San Antonio	Texas Eagle	Bloomington–Normal toward Chicago
Former services
Preceding station	Amtrak	Following station
Springfield toward Laredo or Houston	Inter-American	Bloomington toward Chicago
Springfield Terminus	Loop	Bloomington toward Chicago
Preceding station	Illinois Central Railroad	Following station
Burton View toward Havana	Champaign - Havana	Skelton toward Champaign
Preceding station	Alton Railroad	Following station
Elk Heart toward St. Louis	Main Line	Kickapoo toward Chicago
Location

Lincoln station is an Amtrak train station in Lincoln, Illinois, United States, at Broadway and Chicago Streets. Service is provided by Lincoln Service and the Texas Eagle. The current station is the rail line's former freight depot, renovated in 2017. Adjacent to the current station structure is a brick Spanish Mission-style depot building, constructed in 1911 by the former Chicago and Alton Railroad and later used by the Gulf, Mobile and Ohio Railroad. Although no longer used by Amtrak, the historic 1911 depot has been renovated for commercial use. During the 1980s and 1990s it served dually as a railroad station and restaurant.

== History ==
Many pioneers of Illinois's Logan County tried to develop towns within the county that could become the county seat and business center for local farmers. Early plats and developments include the Postville Courthouse State Historic Site and the Mount Pulaski Courthouse State Historic Site. A final decision on the county seat was not reached until 1853, when a railroad, the predecessor of what was to become the Chicago & Alton, laid tracks through the county as part of a trunk line from Chicago to St. Louis. Railroad management selected a site along the tracks for development, and named the new town after the train line's lawyer, Abraham Lincoln.

On August 27, 1853, Mr. Lincoln arrived from Springfield and led a ceremony by the railroad tracks to mark the founding of the new town. The successful lawyer paid a farmer to bring a wagonload of watermelons, which were handed out to the celebrants. Lincoln cut into one of the melons and "christened" the railroad trackside with the juice.

== Today ==
The spot where this celebration took place is the site of the Lincoln, Illinois railroad depot complex today, and a watermelon monument stands on the south lawn of the former 1911 depot. The 2017 depot primarily serves passengers for Chicago, St. Louis, and points in between, as its predecessor did when the railroad was built in 1853. The 2017 renovation of the depot complex re-purposed former freight space as an Americans with Disabilities Act-compliant station for train passengers, while making historic passenger space available for other uses. The $4.1 million renovation project came from funds through United States Department of Transportation High Speed Rail Initiative money.
