= Alton station (Illinois) =

Railway station in Alton, Illinois, US

Alton, IL
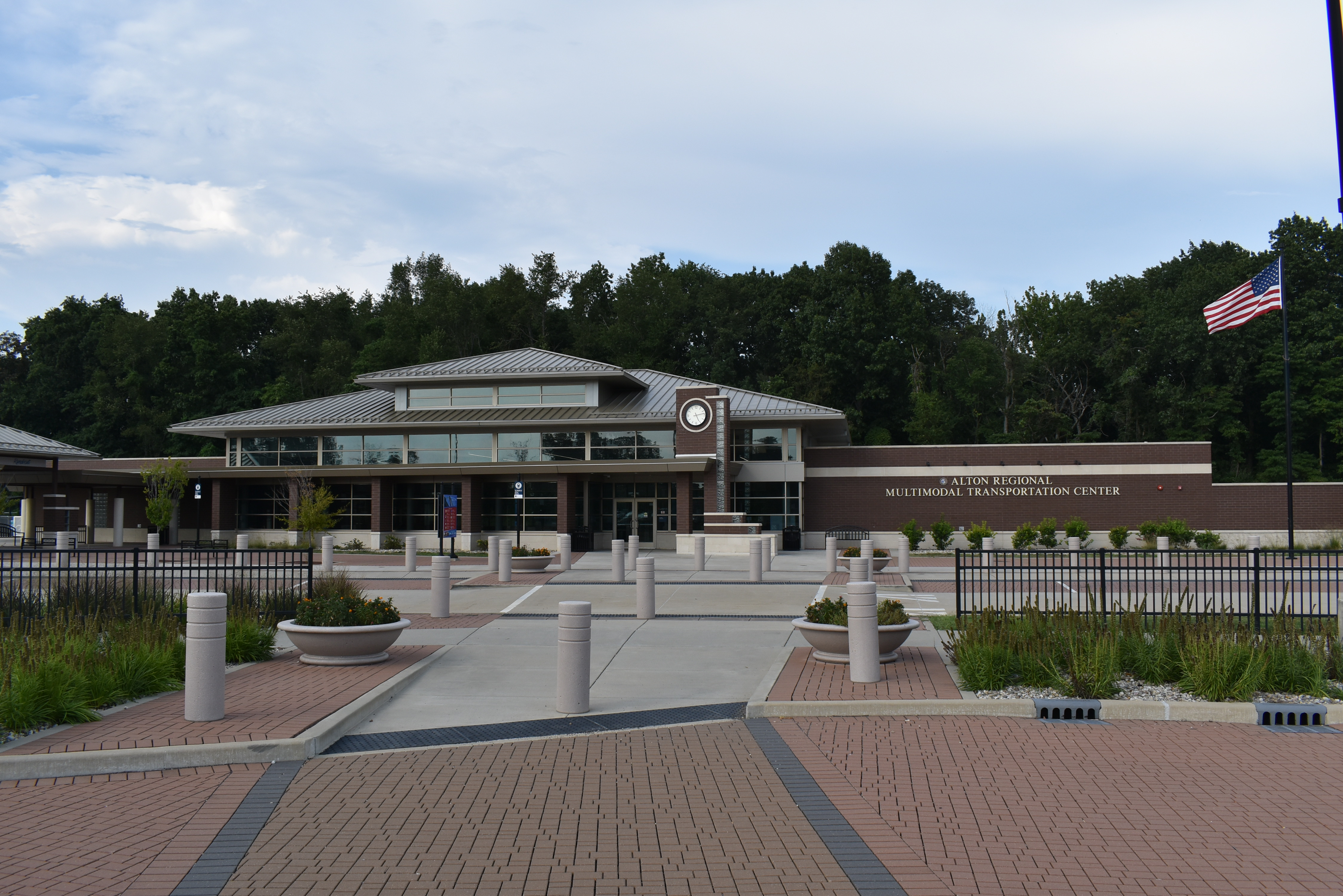
- The Regional Mulitmodal Transportation Center in 2021

General information
- Location: 1 Golf Road; Alton, Illinois; United States
- Coordinates: 38°55′16″N 90°9′26″W
- Owner: Amtrak, IDOT, and the City of Alton
- Line: Union Pacific Railroad
- Platforms: 1 side platform
- Tracks: 1
- Connections: Madison County Transit

Construction
- Parking: 227 spaces
- Cycle facilities: Yes

Other information
- Station code: Amtrak: ALN

History
- Opened: 1928
- Rebuilt: 1989, 2017

Passengers
- FY 2025: 75,548 (Amtrak)

Services
| Preceding station | Amtrak | Following station |
|---|---|---|
| St. Louis Terminus | Lincoln Service | Carlinville toward Chicago |
| St. Louis toward Los Angeles or San Antonio | Texas Eagle | Carlinville toward Chicago |
Former services
| Preceding station | Amtrak | Following station |
At former station
| St. Louis toward Laredo or Houston | Inter-American | Carlinville toward Chicago |
| Preceding station | Alton Railroad | Following station |
| Wood River toward St. Louis | Main Line | Godfrey toward Chicago |
| Godfrey toward Kansas City | Kansas City – St. Louis | Wood River toward St. Louis |
Location

Alton Regional Multimodal Transportation Center, also known as Alton station, is a station in Alton, Illinois, that is served by Amtrak's Lincoln Service and the Texas Eagle. The station was also a stop for the Ann Rutledge until April 2007. It is one of four Amtrak stations in the St. Louis metropolitan area; the other three are the Gateway Multimodal Transportation Center located in St. Louis, the Kirkwood station, and the Washington station.

== History ==
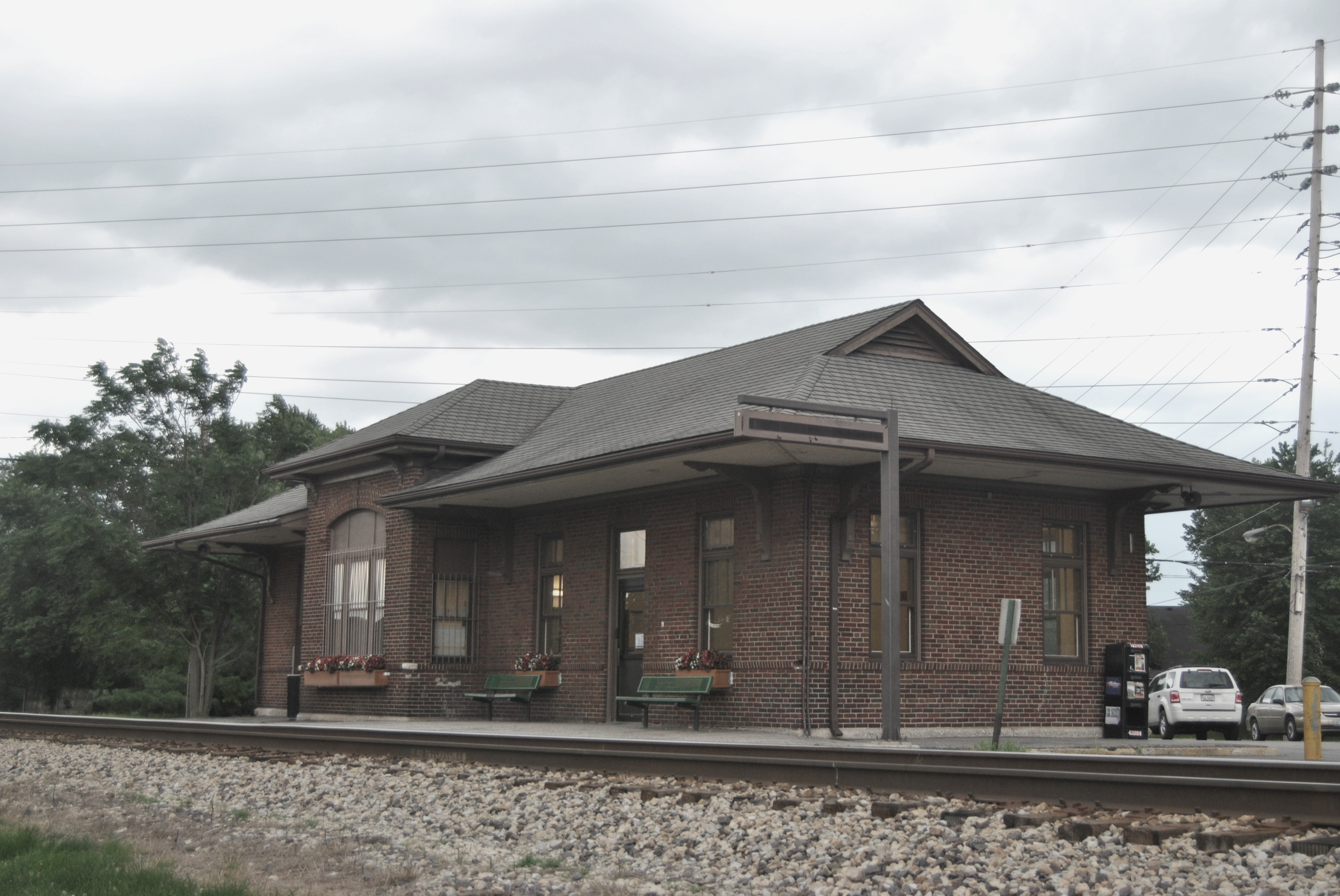
The former station, used until 2017

The former Alton Railroad station, later used by the Gulf, Mobile and Ohio Railroad was built of brick. This station was located on College Avenue, south of the current station location. The 1928-built station was demolished after the current transportation center opened.

Under the Federal Railroad Administration's High-Speed Intercity Passenger Rail (HSIPR) program, the state of Illinois received $1.2 billion to improve the Chicago-St. Louis rail corridor so passenger trains will be able to attain regular speeds of 110 miles per hour (180 km/h). Part of the funding awarded to the Illinois Department of Transportation (IDOT) included $7.4 million for the construction of a new station in Alton, which is one of the busiest Amtrak stops in the state. In December 2011, the city received an additional $13.85 million for the new station through the U.S. Department of Transportation's Transportation Investments Generating Economic Recovery (TIGER) program.

The Alton Regional Multimodal Transportation Center, which opened September 13, 2017, accommodates intercity passenger rail, local and regional buses, taxis, and cyclists. IDOT architects designed the station, and the city then assumed ownership and maintains the property.

== Transportation ==
Alton Station serves as a multimodal transfer point for Amtrak and Madison County Transit.

=== Amtrak ===
The station is currently served by Amtrak's Lincoln Service and the Texas Eagle, with an average of 10 trains daily.

=== Bus transportation ===
The station is connected to Madison County Transit bus routes 7, 8, and 10.
