= Loop (Amtrak train) =

Former intercity train in Illinois, United States

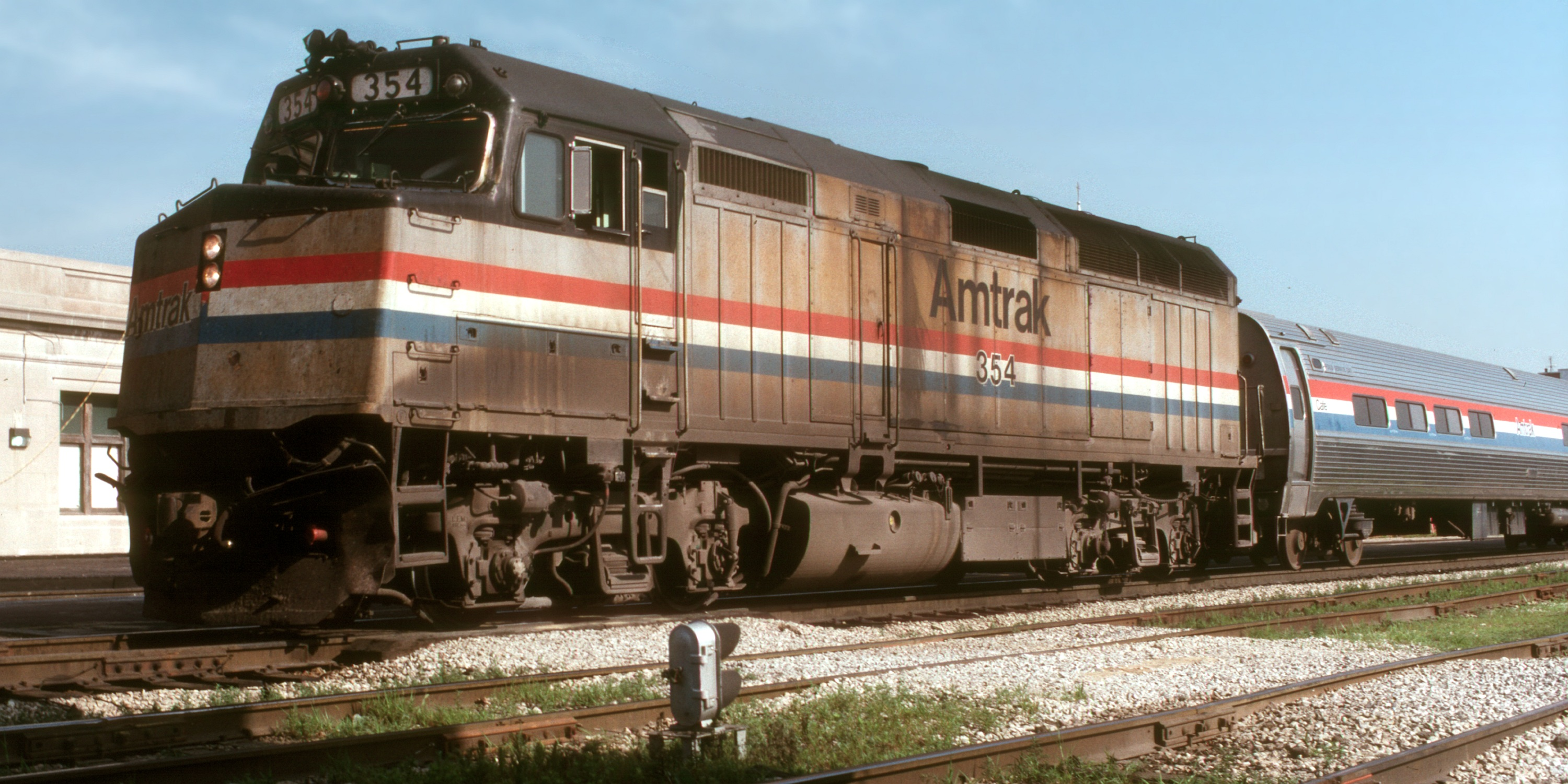
- The Loop at Joliet Union Station in August 1989

Overview
- Service type: Inter-city rail
- Status: Discontinued
- Locale: Illinois
- First service: April 27, 1986
- Last service: June 28, 1996
- Successor: Lincoln Service
- Former operator(s): Amtrak

Route
- Termini: Chicago; Springfield
- Stops: 6
- Distance travelled: 185 miles (298 km)
- Average journey time: 3 hours and 30 minutes
- Service frequency: Daily
- Train number(s): 311, 312

On-board services
- Class(es): Custom class and unreserved coach
- Catering facilities: On-board cafe

Technical
- Rolling stock: Amfleet/Horizon
- Track gauge: 4 ft 8 1/2 in (1,435 mm)

The Loop was a daily passenger train operated by Amtrak between Chicago and Springfield, Illinois. The Loop began on April 27, 1986, with funding support from the state of Illinois. The train acted as a counterpart to the State House, departing Chicago in the morning and returning in the afternoon. Funding shortfalls eliminated Saturday service in mid-1995, and the train ended altogether on June 28, 1996, after Illinois withdrew its support.

The Loop originally operated with refurbished bilevel cars from the Chicago & North Western Railway, but by 1987 Amtrak substituted Amfleet coaches, later supplemented by Horizon Fleet coaches.

In 2006 Amtrak restored and exceeded the service level that had been provided by the Loop by adding two new round trips to the State House, which was rebranded as the Lincoln Service.
