= Carlinville station =

Train station in Carlinville, Illinois, US

Carlinville, IL
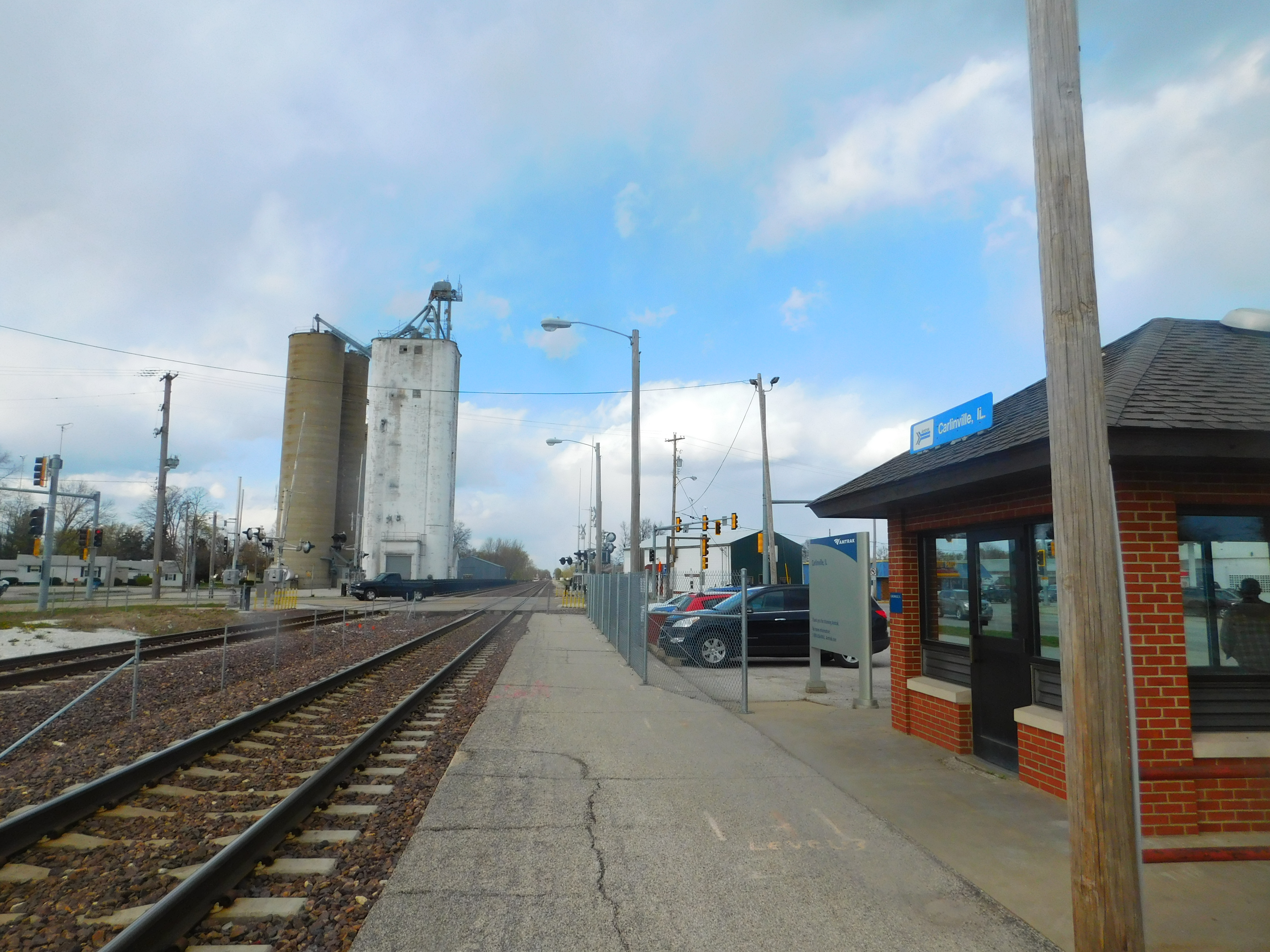
- The Carlinville station in April 2016, pre-renovation.

General information
- Location: 128 Alton Road; Carlinville, Illinois; United States
- Coordinates: 39.27940°N 89.88884°W
- Owner: Amtrak
- Line: UP Springfield Subdivision
- Platforms: 2 side platforms
- Tracks: 2

Other information
- Station code: Amtrak: CRV

History
- Rebuilt: 2017

Passengers
- FY 2025: 9,349 (Amtrak)

Services
Preceding station	Amtrak	Following station
Alton toward St. Louis	Lincoln Service	Springfield toward Chicago
Alton toward Los Angeles or San Antonio	Texas Eagle	Springfield toward Chicago
Former services
Preceding station	Amtrak	Following station
Alton toward Laredo or Houston	Inter-American	Springfield toward Chicago
Location

Carlinville station is a train station in Carlinville, Illinois, United States, served by Amtrak, the national railroad passenger system. Amtrak service is provided by Lincoln Service and the Texas Eagle. This was also a stop for the Ann Rutledge until April 2007. It is a flag stop on the Texas Eagle; the train will stop there only if there are passengers to board or alight there. It is a regular stop on the Lincoln Service.

Construction of a new upgraded station finished in the fall of 2017.

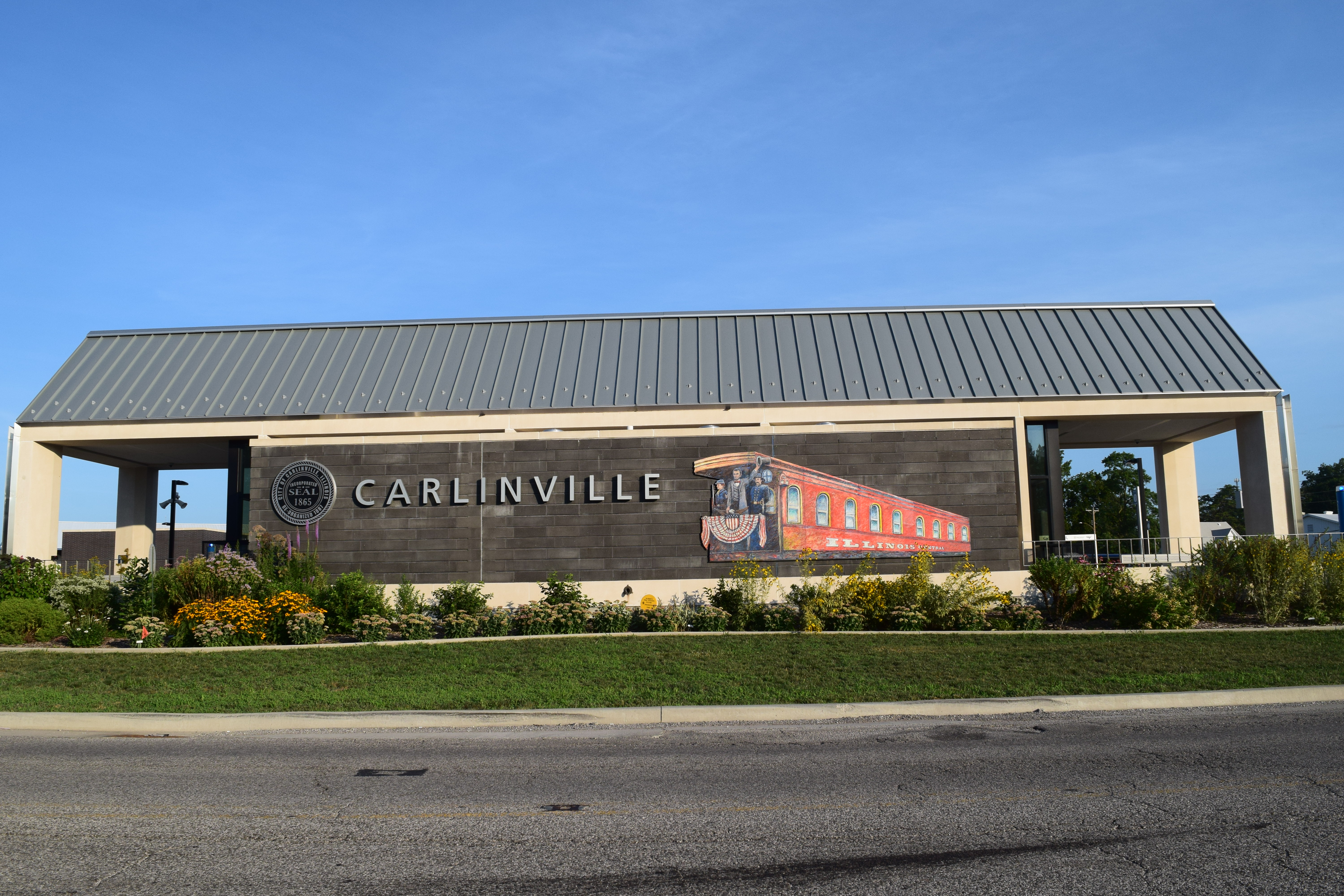
The renovated Carlinville station in 2020
