= Springfield station (Illinois) =

Train station in Springfield, Illinois, U.S.

Springfield, IL
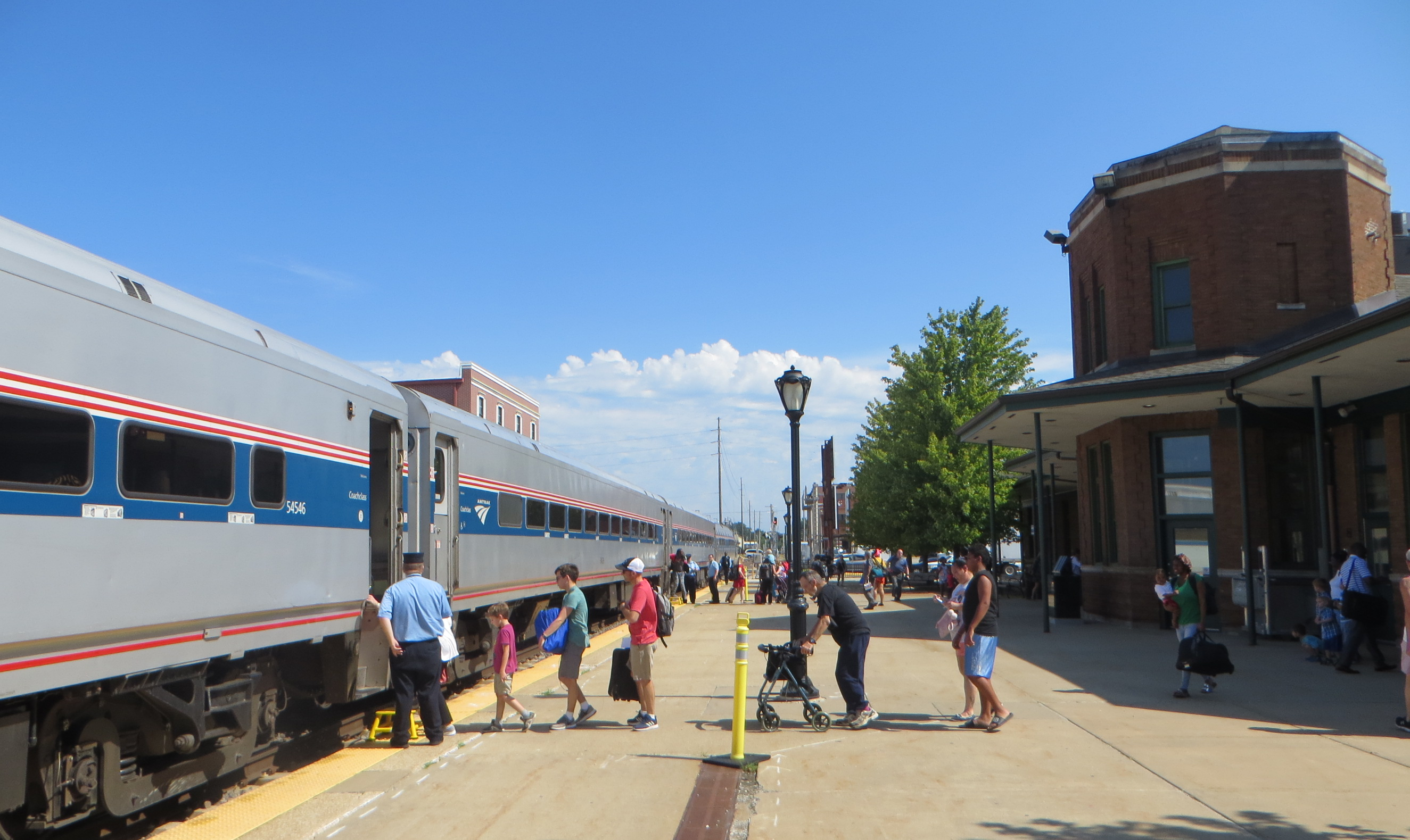
- A Lincoln Service train at Springfield in 2019

General information
- Location: 100 North Third Street; Springfield, Illinois; United States
- Coordinates: 39.8023°N 89.6515°W
- Owner: SPCSL Corporation (subsidiary of Union Pacific)
- Line: UP Springfield Subdivision
- Platforms: 1 side platform
- Tracks: 1
- Connections: SMTD: 4, 7, 12, 903

Construction
- Parking: Yes
- Accessible: Yes

Other information
- Station code: Amtrak: SPI

History
- Opened: 1895

Passengers
- FY 2025: 159,999 (Amtrak)

Services
Preceding station	Amtrak	Following station
Carlinville toward St. Louis	Lincoln Service	Lincoln toward Chicago
Carlinville toward Los Angeles or San Antonio	Texas Eagle	Lincoln toward Chicago
Former services
Preceding station	Amtrak	Following station
Carlinville toward Laredo or Houston	Inter-American	Lincoln toward Chicago
Terminus	Loop	Lincoln toward Chicago
Preceding station	Alton Railroad	Following station
Chatham toward St. Louis	Main Line	Sherman toward Chicago
Location

Springfield station is a brick railroad depot in Springfield, Illinois, the state capital. It is at mile 185 on Amtrak's Illinois and Missouri Route. As of 2007, it is served by five daily round trips each way: the daily Texas Eagle, and four daily Lincoln Service frequencies. It will be replaced by the Springfield-Sangamon Transportation Center, which is currently under construction, and expected to open in 2027.

== History ==
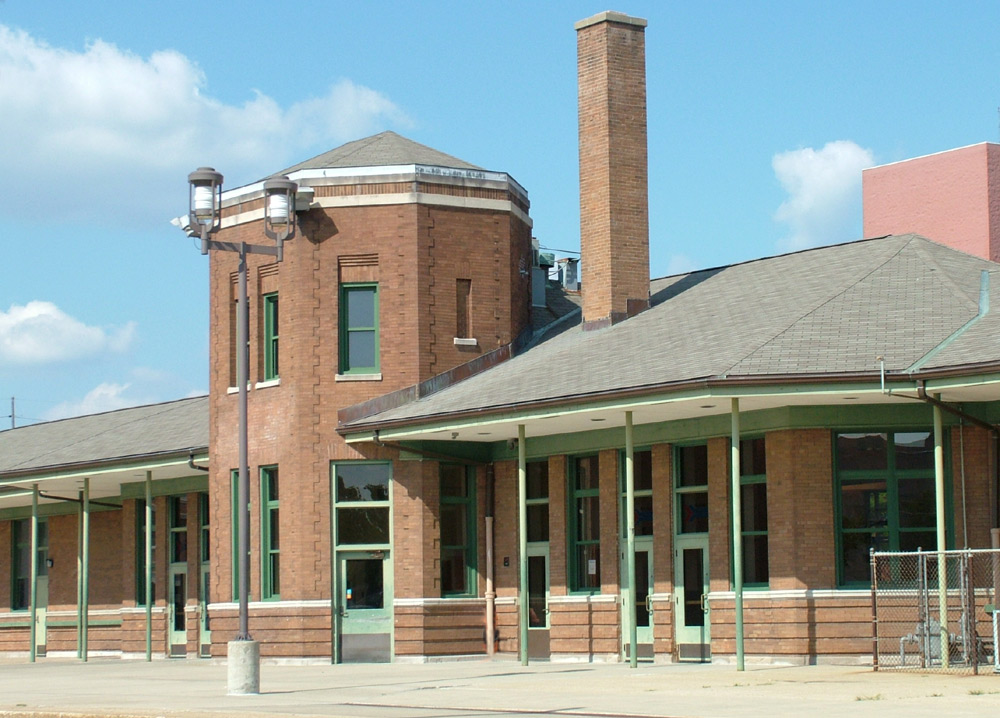
The station building in 2005

The station was originally constructed by the Chicago and Alton Railroad in 1895 and is one of three historic railroad stations still existing in the city, along with the Lincoln Depot built by the Great Western Railroad in 1852 and Springfield Union Station built by the Illinois Central Railroad in 1898. Prior to the start up of Amtrak on May 1, 1971 it was operated by a successor company, the Gulf, Mobile and Ohio Railroad, and was served by a variety of named trains, including the Alton Limited, the Abraham Lincoln, and the Midnight Special.

Springfield was intended to be the southwestern terminus of the State House, predecessor of today's Lincoln Service. However, Amtrak extended this train to St. Louis at its own expense because the Chicago and Alton/GM&O station was not designed to turn trainsets around.

Louis Grell mural in railroad station.

The passenger station is decorated with a small mural. Painted on the wall atop the ticket office, the mural features a route map of the post-1947 Gulf, Mobile and Ohio Railroad and the state seals of Alabama, Illinois, Kentucky, Louisiana, Mississippi, Missouri and Tennessee. The mural is the work of Louis Grell of Chicago.

In a 2010–2011 project, authorities supervised the railroad station's comprehensive refurbishment. Overhauled elements included the GM&O mural, trackside landscaping, passenger seating, handicapped accessibility, parking lot repaving and a new station roof. The $714,500 project was financed by the city and Amtrak. Springfield used $571,500 obtained through the Central Area Tax Increment Financing (TIF) district that covers much of the downtown. Other stakeholders involved in the renovation included Union Pacific Railroad, which owns the track and platform, and the Illinois Historic Preservation Agency, which reviewed project plans to ensure that the station's historic elements were preserved.

== Replacement station ==
In October 2021, ground was broken on the Springfield-Sangamon Transportation Center, a transit hub that will consolidate Amtrak service and Sangamon Mass Transit District buses. It was originally expected to open in 2025, but in late 2023, the federal Department of Transportation denied a $138 million grant needed to complete the works; this delay pushed the expected opening back to 2027. When complete, the new station will replace the current Amtrak station. The current station could become an activity hub for the projected Third Street Greenway, a 6.0-mile (10 km) urban greenway that will utilize the current Amtrak right-of-way through Springfield.

== See also ==
- Lincoln Depot
- Springfield Union Station (Illinois)
