= Peoria Charter Coach Company =

Bus company based in Peoria, Illinois

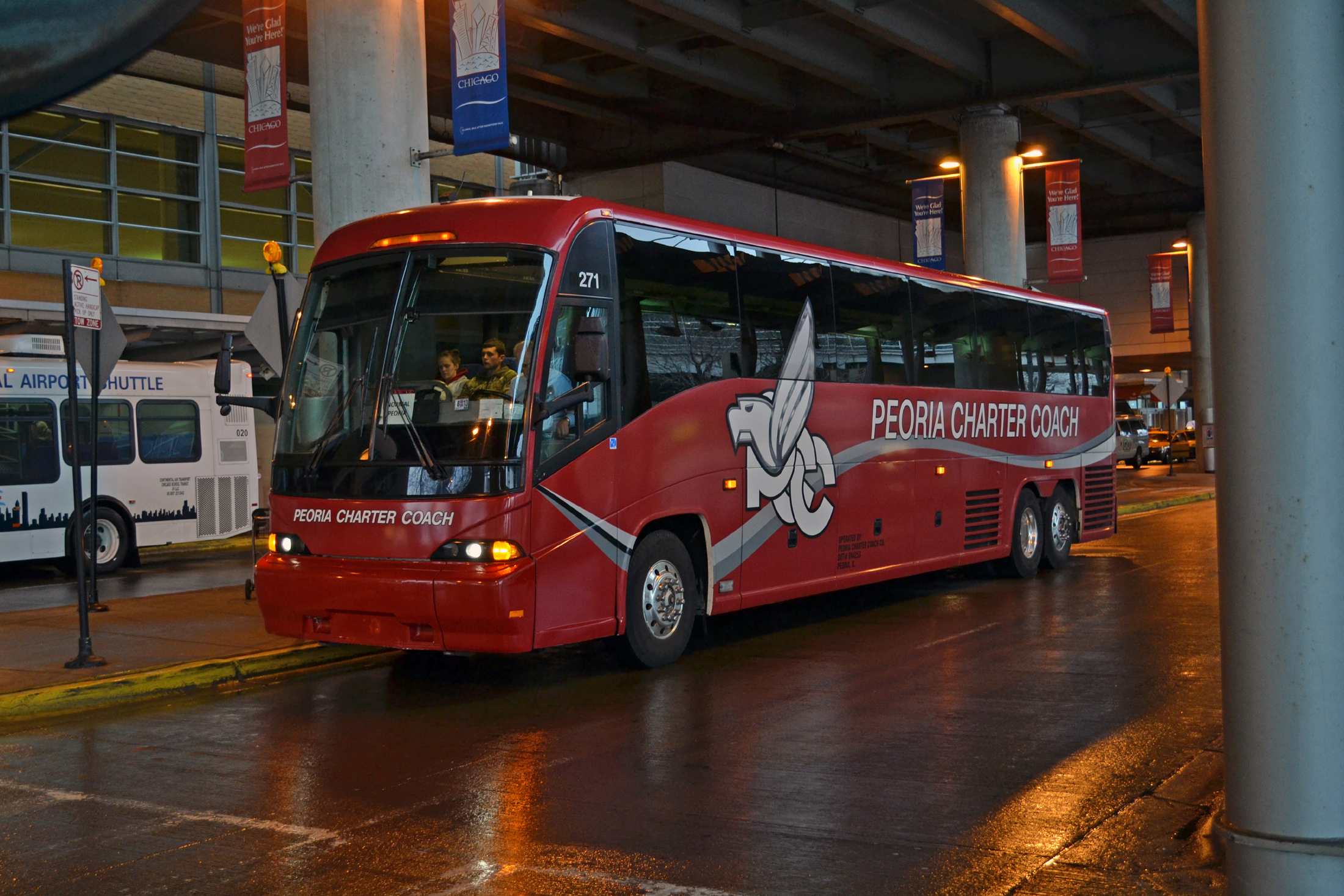
- Founded: 1941, by Walter Winkler
- Commenced operation: 1941
- Headquarters: Peoria, Illinois
- Service area: Illinois
- Service type: Charter bus services, custom group tours, transportation from several universities in Illinois to Chicago suburbs and airports
- Destinations: Various locations in Illinois, mainland United States, international
- Fleet: 60
- Annual ridership: 470,000
- Manager: James Wang, CEO
- Website: peoriacharter.com

Peoria Charter Coach Company is a family-owned bus company based in Peoria, Illinois, which provides charter bus services, custom group tours, and transportation from several universities in Illinois to Chicago suburbs and airports. It is a contract charter bus service provider for the University of Illinois Urbana–Champaign.

== History ==
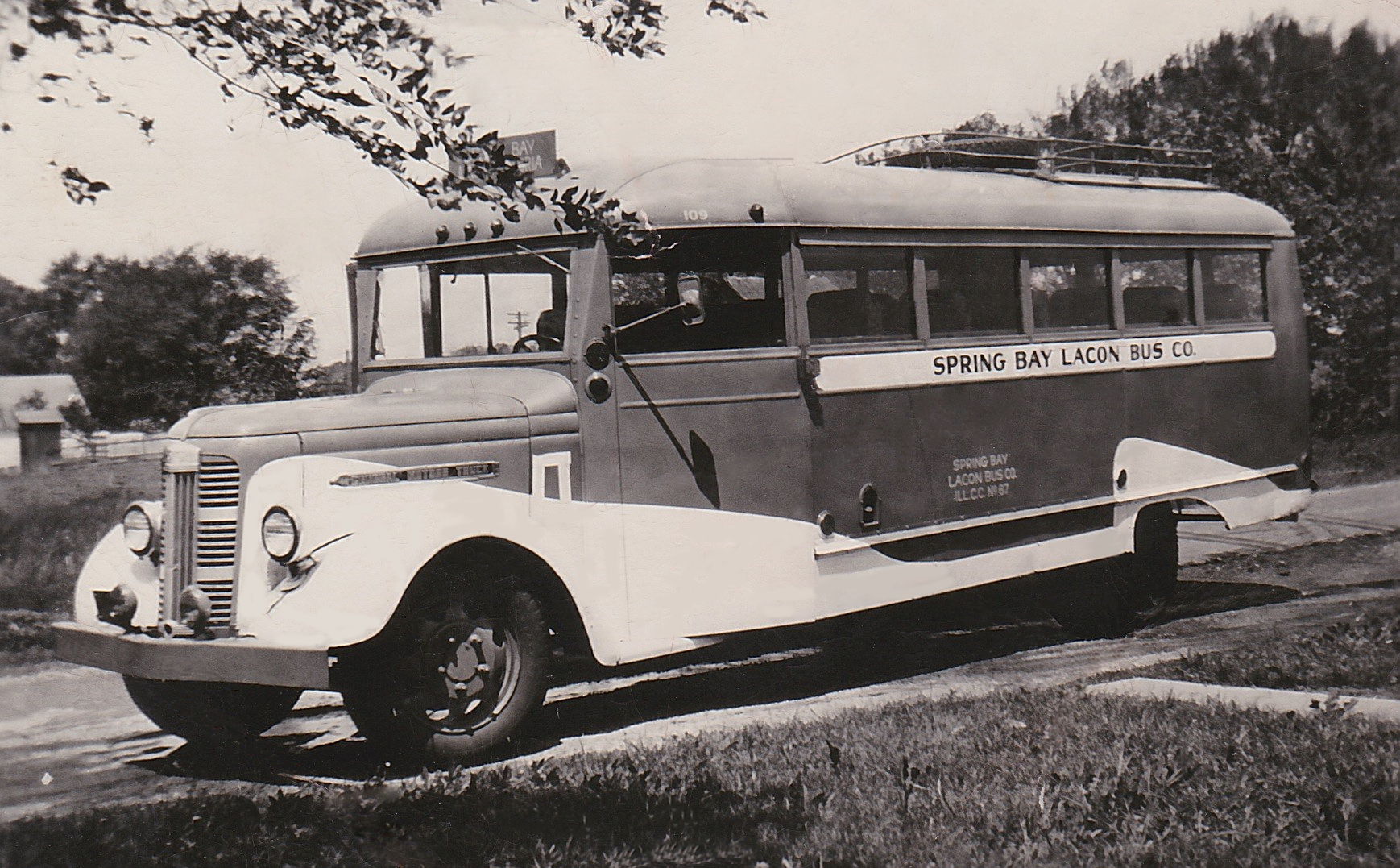
Peoria Charter Coach Company's first bus in 1941

Peoria Charter Coach Company was founded in 1941 by Walter Winkler, who traded in the family car and received a loan from his sister to buy a bus to shuttle Caterpillar workers between Spring Bay and a new factory in Peoria, when gas was rationed during World War II. In 1979, Winkler stepped down and his sons Roger and Stanley took over the business. In 1990, Roger bought Stanley's share of the business when the latter retired. In 1999, Roger's son William and his wife Cindy took over the business, buying it from Roger.

In 2010, Peoria Charter opened a new terminal in Urbana. In 2013, the company moved its pickup location in Joliet from the Joliet Mall parking lot to the Union Station parking lot, in order to meet customers' demand for overnight parking.

The company introduced online ticketing in 2010.

On July 15, 2020, Peoria Charter Coach announced that it had laid off all but eight of its 140 employees in response to declining revenues due to the COVID-19 pandemic. On social media, co-owner Jingning (James) Wang stated that Peoria Charter's monthly overhead was $300,000 versus only $25,000 in revenue.

On April 1, 2024, Peoria Charter appointed James Wang as their CEO.

On October 10, 2024, James Wang purchased Peoria Charter from the Winkler Family, as Bill Winkler was ready to retire.

In December 2025, Peoria Charter filed for Chapter 11 bankruptcy protection after being unable to make a final balloon payment on a COVID-19 loan that they received during the Main Street Loans Program of the CARES Act. In July 2026, Peoria Charter successfully obtained confirmation of its subchapter V Chapter 11 plan.

== Services ==
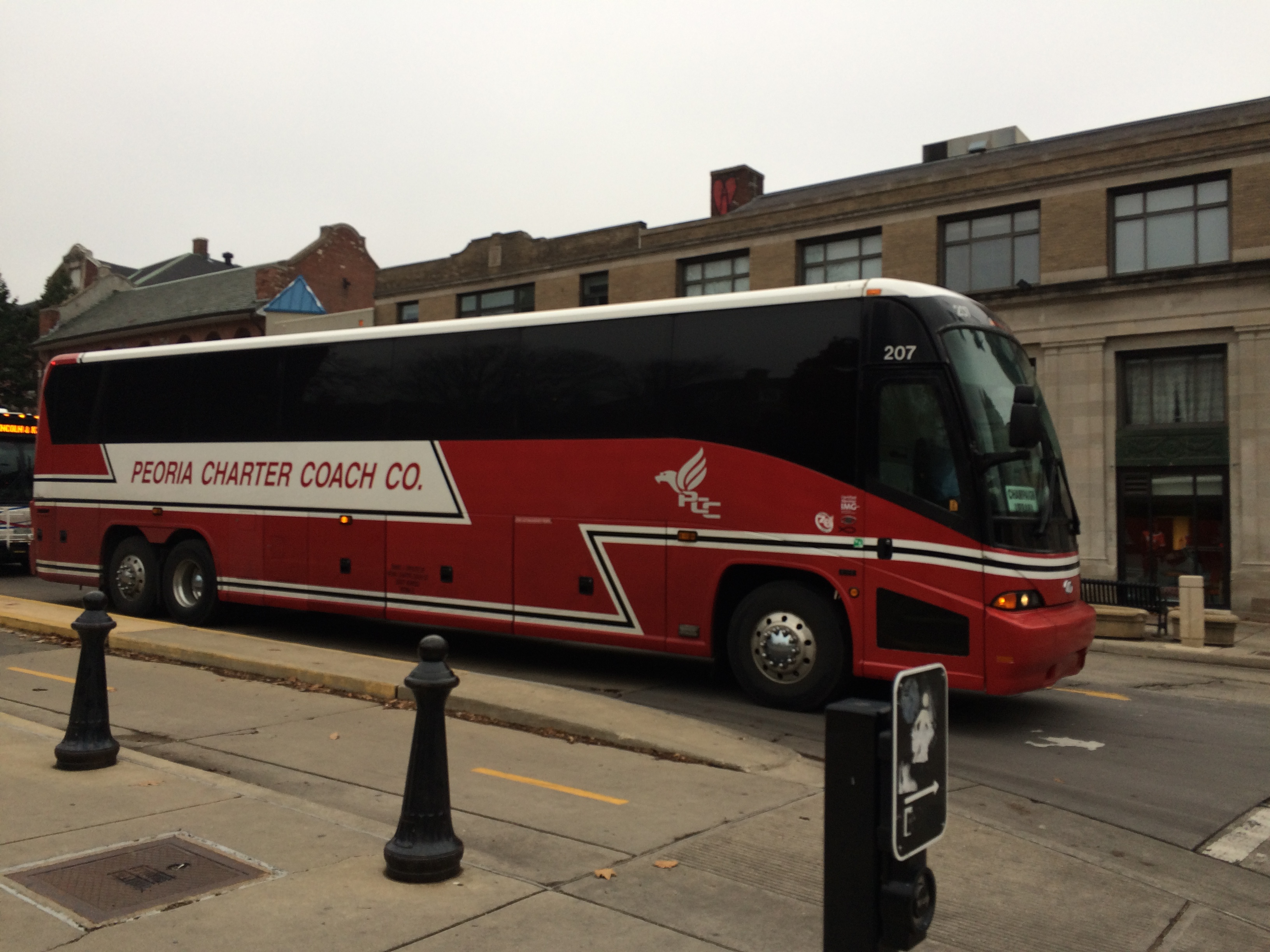
A Peoria Charter bus on Wright Street on the campus of the University of Illinois at Urbana–Champaign

Peoria Charter serves five universities - University of Illinois at Urbana–Champaign, Illinois State University, Western Illinois University, Illinois Wesleyan University, and Bradley University. It provides transportation from these universities to Chicago suburbs, and to Chicago O'Hare and Midway airports. It also provides inter-city transportation to people in Chicago suburbs, Peoria, Urbana, Champaign, Bloomington, Normal, and Joliet. It organizes group tours to various locations in Illinois and mainland United States, and to international destinations.

Peoria Charter is one of the two approved contract charter bus service providers for the University of Illinois at Urbana–Champaign, the other being Monticello Bus Company.

== Awards and distinctions ==
In 1995, Peoria Charter won the Mississippi Valley Family Business of the Year award. In 2003, it received an honorable mention distinction for Better Business Bureau's International Torch Award for marketplace ethics, a competition in which there were 1,500 contestants. In 2012, it received a Department of Defense safety certification from Trailways.

== Fatal accidents ==
On Friday, January 27, 1995, a Peoria Charter bus collided with a church van on foggy Monticello Road in Savoy, Illinois. After leaving the proper lane of travel and entering the path of the charter bus, causing the collision, The van burst into flames and seven children perished. . "The bus was transporting stranded air travellers whose flights were cancelled in St. Louis," according to the Gazette.
