= Sangamon Mass Transit District =

Coordinates: 39°47′31.1″N 89°38′36.4″W

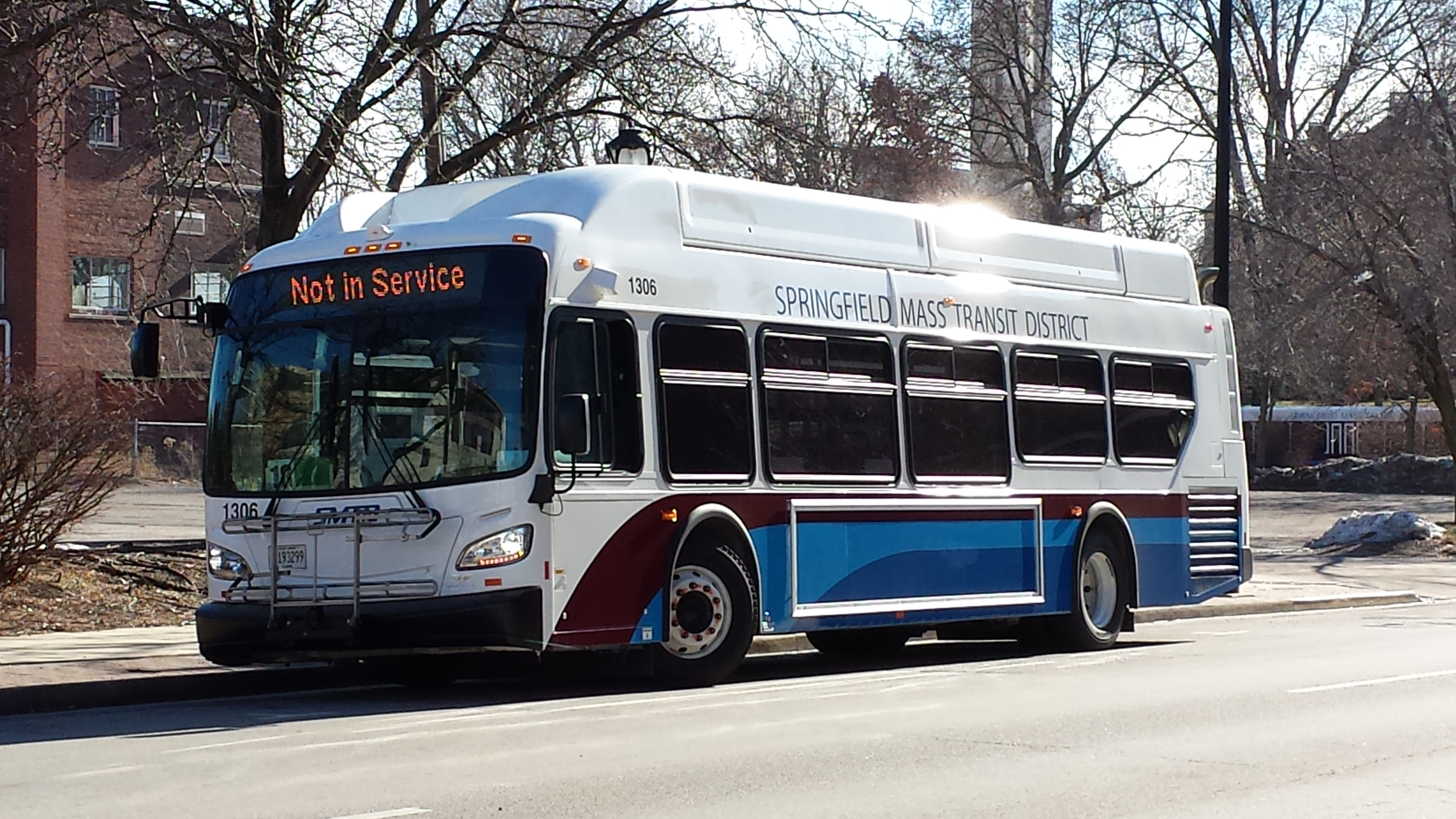
- Founded: 1968
- Headquarters: 928 South Ninth Street
- Locale: Springfield, Illinois
- Service type: bus service, paratransit
- Routes: 18 regular day routes 9 night routes 9 supplemental routes
- Fleet: 57 buses 22 paratransit vans
- Daily ridership: 5,100 (weekdays, Q2 2026)
- Annual ridership: 1,426,600 (2025)
- Fuel type: Compressed natural gas Diesel
- Website: smtd.org

The Sangamon Mass Transit District (SMTD) is a regional mass transit district that mostly serves Springfield, Illinois, along with a few neighboring communities. It is governed by a seven-member board of trustees, who are all appointed by the Sangamon County Board of Supervisors. In 2025, the system had a ridership of 1,426,600, or about 5,100 per weekday as of the second quarter of 2026.

== Routes ==
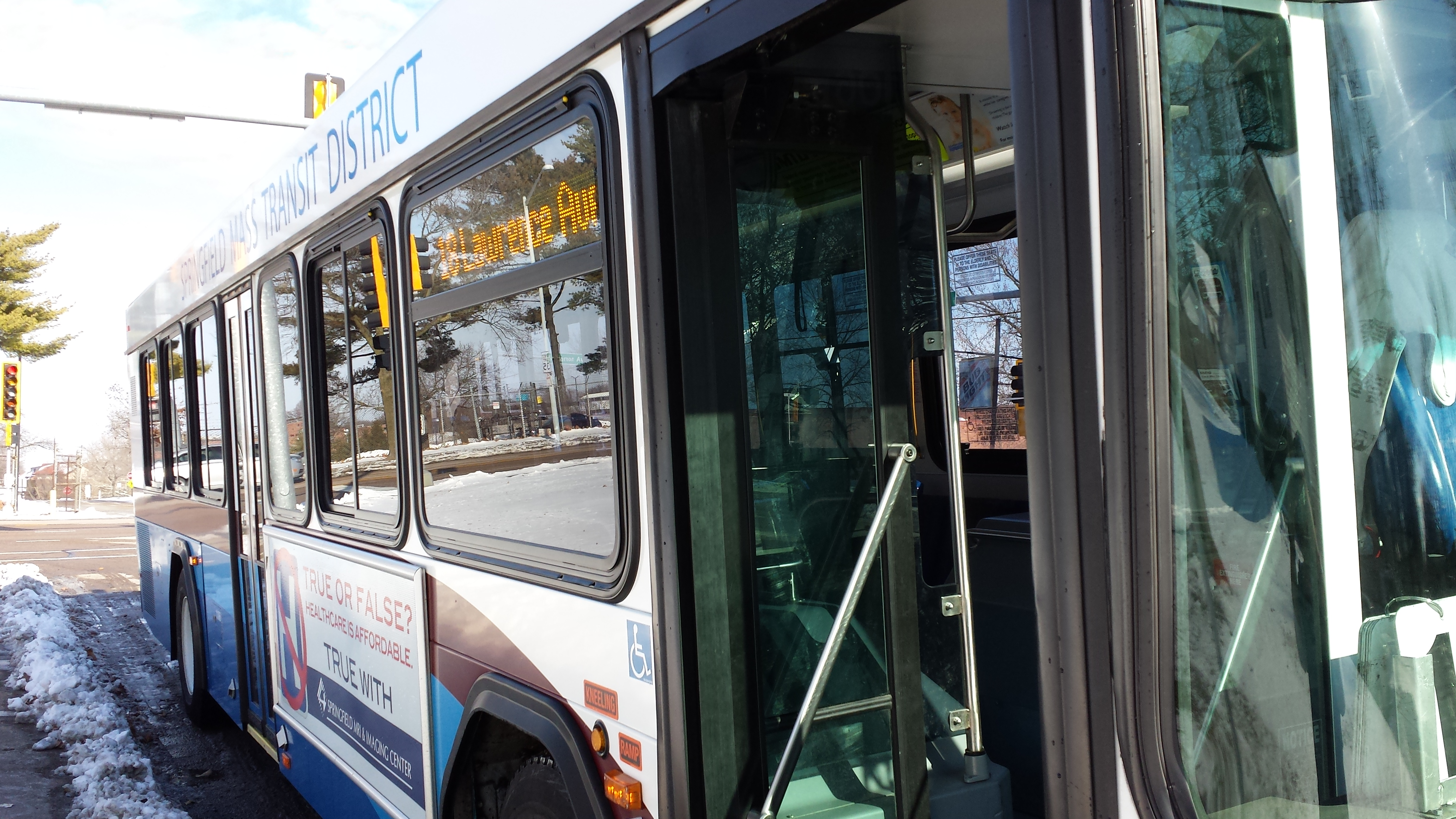
Low Floor Gillig 2011 series. 35 ft. On former Route 1 N. Fifth before turning into former Route 18 Lawrence/Knox Knolls

The Sangamon Mass Transit District operates 18 regular routes during the day, 9 routes at night, and 9 supplemental routes which serve schools. On weekdays between 6 a.m. and 5:30 p.m., most routes run every half-hour. Eleven of the day routes begin at the downtown transfer center, at 11th and Washington Streets, with buses leaving downtown at the top and bottom of the hour. Five routes begin at a secondary transfer center on Junction Circle, on the southwest side, where most of the area's growth and new development has taken place in recent decades. These routes leave Junction Circle at 15 and 45 minutes past the hour. One special route carries passengers between both locations, and one special route serves the colleges and nearby areas. On weeknights between 6 and 10 p.m., seven routes leave downtown once an hour, at the top of the hour, and two others begin and end at the University of Illinois at Springfield. The last buses of the night return to downtown at 11 p.m. Supplemental routes run only once per day. No service is offered on Sundays, nor on New Year's Day, Memorial Day, Independence Day, Labor Day, Thanksgiving, or Christmas.

Daytime routes

- Route 0 Transfer Center Express – Downtown to Junction Circle
- Route 1 Downtown to North 5th St. / Sand Hill Rd. - serves Illinois State Fairgrounds
- Route 2 Downtown to North 9th St. / Piper Rd. / Northgate subdivision
- Route 3 Downtown to Clear Lake Ave. / Midwest Technical Institute / Grandview
- Route 4 Downtown to West Lawrence Ave. / West Jefferson St.
- Route 5 Downtown to Memorial Medical Center / St. John's Hospital / North Grand Ave.
- Route 6 Junction Circle to Clear Lake Ave.
- Route 7 Downtown to West Washington St. / White Oaks Mall
- Route 8 Downtown to South Grand Ave. / South MacArthur Blvd. - serves Leland Grove and Jerome
- Route 9 Downtown to Martin Luther King Dr. / East Cook St.
- Route 10 Downtown to South 11th St. / Stevenson Dr. - serves the Laketown neighborhood
- Route 11 Downtown to University of Illinois Springfield
- Route 12 Downtown to South 6th St. / Southern View / Memorial Medical Center and St. John's Hospital
- Route 13 Junction Circle to White Oaks Mall and other shopping centers on the southwest side
- Route 14 Junction Circle to Southern View and Toronto Rd.
- Route 15 Junction Circle to University of Illinois Springfield via Southern View, Chatham Hills subdivision
- Route 16 Junction Circle to West Wabash Ave.
- Route 501 University of Illinois at Springfield to Lincoln Land Community College and nearby residential areas

Evening Routes

- Route 2 Downtown to North 9th St. / Piper Rd. / Northgate subdivision
- Route 3 Downtown to Clear Lake Ave. / Midwest Technical Institute / Grandview
- Route 5 Downtown to Memorial Medical Center / St. John's Hospital / North Grand Ave.
- Route 902 Southeast Side
- Route 903 West Side
- Route 904 Southwest Side via Macarthur
- Route 905 UIS
- Route 15 UIS to Chatham Hills subdivision via Junction Circle and Southern View
- Route 501 UIS to LLCC and Lake Pointe subdivision

Supplemental routes

- Route 202 Ash and Greentree to Laketown/Southern View
- Route 204 Lewis and Adams to downtown
- Route 208 11th and North Grand to downtown
- Route 210 Lewis and Adams to Amos / Golf / Brentwood
- Route 212 Ash and Greentree to downtown
- Route 214 11th and North Grand to Bruns Lane
- Route 215 Laketown/Southern View to Ash and Greentree
- Route 217 Clearlake to 11th and North Grand
- Route 220 Lewis and Adams to East Cook / Martin Luther King Jr. Drive

== Cash fare, transfers and passes ==
Regular bus fare is $1.25 for anyone age five or over. Up to two children under the age of four are permitted on the buses free of charge with an adult. More than two children under this age will cost an additional 60 cents. For senior citizens, disabled persons, or Medicare card holders, fare is 60 cents with proof of such status. Senior citizens and disabled persons enrolled in the Benefit Access program can procure a photo ID that enables them to ride without paying a fare. Transfers between connecting buses are free and available upon request of the driver when fare is initially paid.

Discount bus passes for students, senior citizens, and disabled people are available at public, private, and parochial schools, Lincoln Library, the local Hy-Vee, and the SMTD home office at 928 S. 9th Street. Reloadable fare cards are available at the main office.

== Buses ==
Fleet numbers	Build Date	Photos	Manufacturer	Model	Engine	Transmission
1301-1305	2013		Gillig	Low Floor 29'	Cummins ISL9	Allison B400R
1306	2012		New Flyer	XN35	Cummins Westport ISL G	Allison B400R
1307-1309	2013		New Flyer	XN35	Cummins Westport ISL G	Allison B400R
1310-1312	2014		New Flyer	XN35	Cummins Westport ISL G	Allison B400R
1401-1407	2014		Gillig	Low Floor 35'	Cummins ISL9	Allison B400R
1701-1702	2017		New Flyer	XD35	Cummins L9	Allison B400R
1801-1808	2018		New Flyer	XD35	Cummins L9	Allison B400R
1809-1812	2017		New Flyer	XN35	Cummins Westport L9N	Allison B400R
1813-1817	2018		New Flyer	XN35	Cummins Westport L9N	Allison B400R
1901-1906	2019		New Flyer	XN35	Cummins Westport L9N	Allison B400R
2301-2304	2023		New Flyer	XN35	Cummins Westport L9N	Allison B400R
2401-2408	2024		Gillig	BRTPlus HEV 35'	Cummins L9	Allison eGen Flex hybrid system

== Paratransit ==
The SMTD operates a paratransit service named Access Sangamon for disabled people who are unable to use the regular buses. Service is available at the same times that the regular buses are operating.

== Funding and employees ==
In 2017, the employee headcount was 143, of whom 116 were members of labor unions and 27 were administrative personnel. The annual budget was $7.2 million.

In the SMTD's 2017 operating budget, 9% was met through fares paid by riders. An additional 1% was earned through other private-sector-style income streams, such as income from placards and billboards on the buses, and the remaining 90% consisted of federal, state, and local public-sector funding.

== Recent developments ==
On January 1, 2017, SMTD changed its operating name from Springfield Mass Transit District to Sangamon Mass Transit District. Limited-service suburban routes ran from 2018 to 2022.

In 2019, the city opened a new transfer center on the east edge of downtown, and at the same time, completely overhauled its routes. The redesigned routes cover a larger geographical area than before, bringing service with reach of up to 10,000 additional area residents. Construction of the Springfield-Sangamon Transportation Center at the downtown transfer center began in 2021, and improvements are under construction to an adjacent railroad. When complete, the new facility is expected to become part of the Chicago Hub Network, Illinois' new high-speed rail system, with stops by trains and intercity buses. Greyhound buses began using the new transfer point in November 2022. Presently, Amtrak trains run on another railroad about half a mile west of the new transfer center.

In 2022, the SMTD board approved a Zero Emissions Transition Plan, which would see the removal of all diesel buses by 2035 in favor of a combination of hybrid and zero-emission buses, with all buses being zero-emission by 2048. As of 2022, 60% of buses in the fleet were diesel powered, with the remainder being powered by compressed natural gas.

== Fixed Route Ridership ==
The ridership statistics shown here are of fixed route services only and do not include demand response.

== See also ==
- List of bus transit systems in the United States
- Springfield station
