= Hermann station (Missouri) =

Hermann, MO
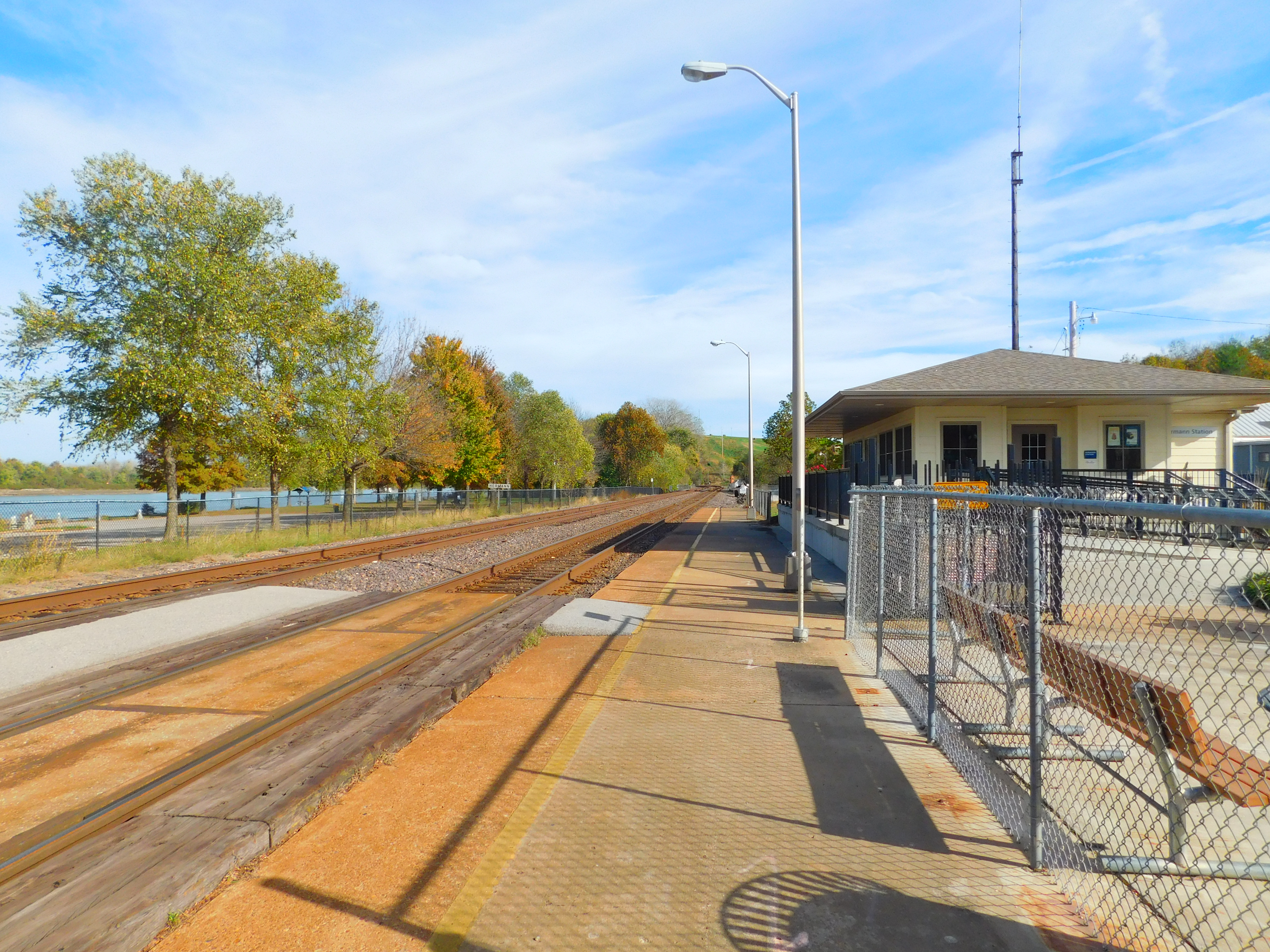
- Hermann station in November 2016.

General information
- Location: 301 Wharf Street; Hermann, Missouri; United States
- Coordinates: 38.7073°N 91.4327°W
- Owner: City of Hermann, Union Pacific Railroad
- Line: UP Jefferson City Subdivision
- Platforms: 1 side platform
- Tracks: 2

Construction
- Parking: Yes
- Accessible: Yes

Other information
- Station code: Amtrak: HEM

History
- Opened: September 28, 1991
- Rebuilt: September 12, 2014

Passengers
- FY 2025: 27,306 (Amtrak)

Services
Preceding station	Amtrak	Following station
Jefferson City toward Kansas City	Missouri River Runner	Washington toward St. Louis
Former services
Preceding station	Missouri Pacific Railroad	Following station
Gasconade toward Kansas City	Main Line	Berger toward St. Louis
Location

Hermann station is an Amtrak train station in Hermann, Missouri, United States. Hermann became a permanent stop on September 28, 1991 when the Mules and Ann Rutledge began stopping there. Trains had previously stopped only during Hermann's annual Maifest and Octoberfest.

A rebuilt station was approved for construction in 2006 and opened on September 12, 2014. The one story depot features a random rubble stone veneer base, walls clad in traditional clapboard siding and a hipped roof. The waiting room is trimmed in bead board wainscoting, and there are also accessible restrooms. Displays trace the area's transportation history, with a focus on the Missouri River, railroads and roadways. Funding for the project came through the Federal Highway Administration's Transportation Enhancements program, the city of Hermann and the Dierberg Educational Foundation, a local non-profit organization that supports projects to preserve the region's cultural heritage.

== See also ==
- List of Amtrak stations
