= Amtrak Midwest =

Amtrak train routes in the Midwest US

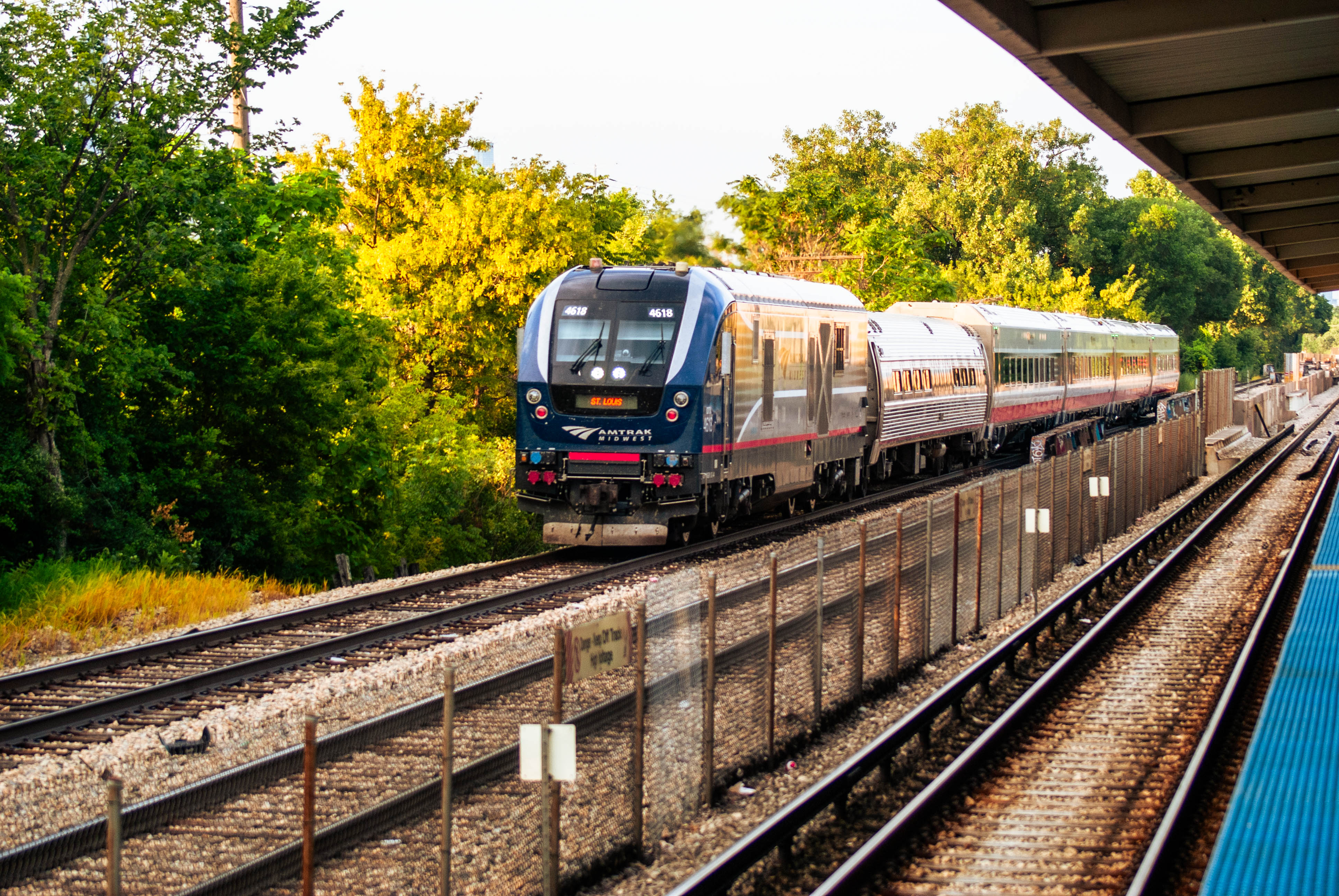
- St. Louis-bound Lincoln Service train passes the CTA's 35th/Archer station in Chicago, Illinois

Overview
- Locale: Midwestern United States
- Transit type: Inter-city rail
- Number of lines: 11
- Website: Amtrak Midwest

Operation
- Operator: Amtrak

Technical
- Track gauge: 4 ft 8 1/2 in (1,435 mm) standard gauge

Amtrak Midwest is a brand name applied by Amtrak to its state-supported routes in the Midwest states of Illinois, Michigan, Wisconsin, Minnesota, and Missouri. The routes form a hub-and-spoke network around Chicago Union Station, with all trains terminating there except for one Missouri River Runner round trip. As of 2026, Amtrak Midwest consists of eleven named trains:

- Borealis
- Hiawatha
- Illinois Service: Lincoln Service, Illinois Zephyr and Carl Sandburg, and Illini and Saluki
- Michigan Services: Blue Water, Wolverine, and Pere Marquette
- Missouri River Runner

Other routes in development include the Quad Cities and Northern Lights Express.

== Operations ==
=== Services ===
As of 2026, Amtrak Midwest consists of eleven named trains operating in ten service patterns. The Illinois Zephyr and Carl Sandburg share identical routes, as do the Illini and Saluki. The Lincoln Service and Missouri River Runner operate separately except for one daily round trip (trains 318 and 319) in which they are combined. There are 22 Amtrak Midwest round trips each weekday, with the Hiawatha running slightly different frequencies on Fridays, Saturdays, and Sundays.

Route	Terminus	Via	Terminus	Ridership FY 2025	Weekday round trips	Supporting states				
Route	Terminus	Via	Terminus	Ridership FY 2025	Weekday round trips	MN	WI	IL	MI	MO
Borealis	St. Paul	Milwaukee	Chicago	212,909	1	●	●	●		
Hiawatha	Milwaukee	Glenview	Chicago	631,990	6		●	●		
Illinois Zephyr and Carl Sandburg	Quincy	Galesburg	Chicago	146,049	2			●		
Illini and Saluki	Carbondale	Champaign–Urbana	Chicago	319,114	2			●		
Wolverine	Pontiac	Detroit	Chicago	438,427	3				●	
Blue Water	Port Huron	Flint	Chicago	177,739	1				●	
Pere Marquette	Grand Rapids	Holland	Chicago	97,177	1				●	
Lincoln Service	St. Louis	Springfield	Chicago	592,735	3			●		
Lincoln Service / Missouri River Runner	Kansas City	St. Louis	Chicago	N/A	1			●		●
Missouri River Runner	Kansas City	Jefferson City	St. Louis	196,989	1					●
Total					22					

Indiana is not part of Amtrak Midwest as the state does not sponsor any Amtrak routes, although two Wolverine trips stop at Hammond–Whiting station. Indiana discontinued its only state-supported train, the Hoosier State, in 2019.

State-supported service in the Midwest is supplemented by a number of long-distance Amtrak routes, such as the Empire Builder, California Zephyr and City of New Orleans. These are federally-funded, have separate equipment, and do not fall under the Amtrak Midwest brand.

=== Rolling stock ===
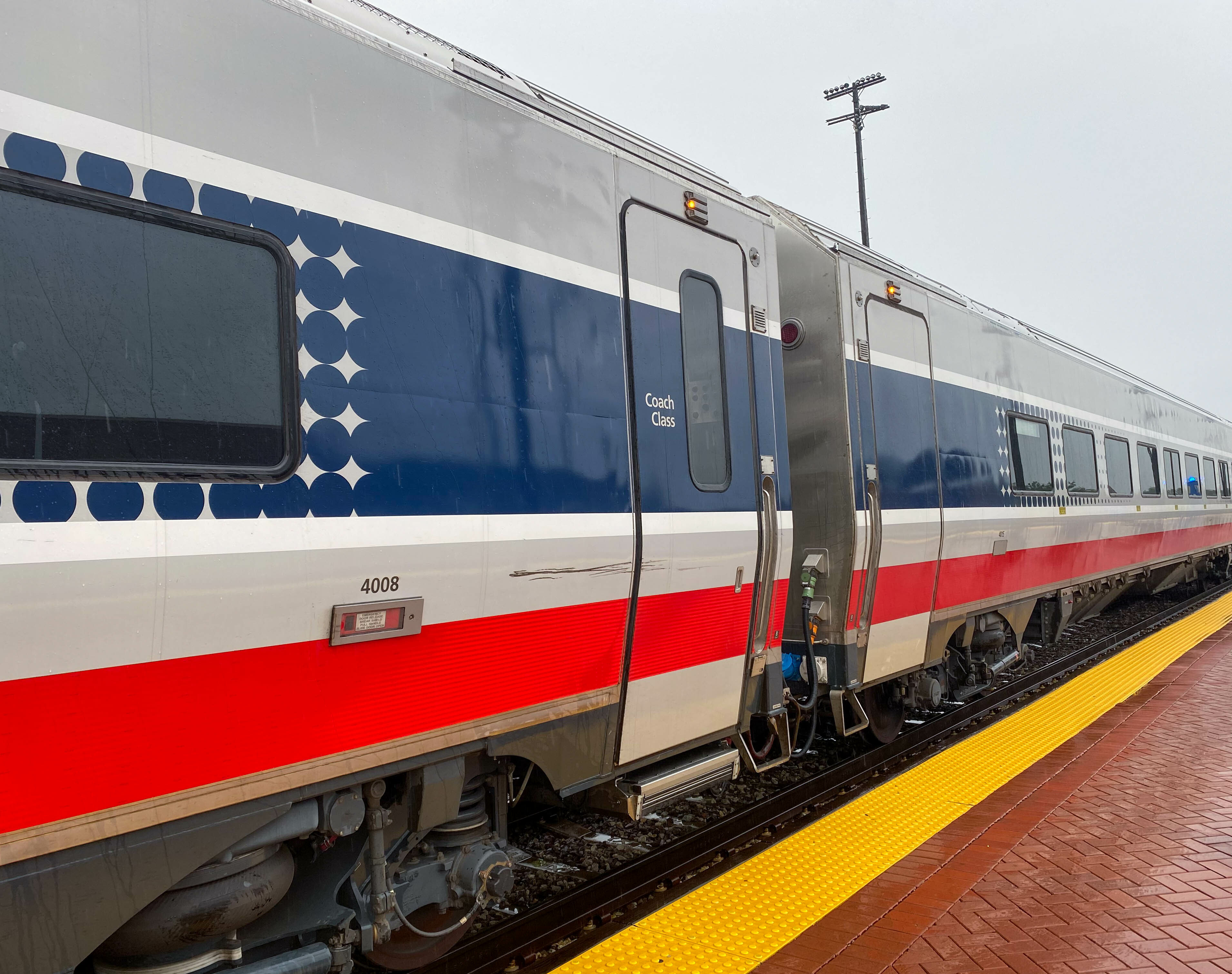
Amtrak Midwest Siemens Venture coach cars

Amtrak Midwest routes generally share a pool of rolling stock, though certain equipment is exclusive to certain routes. In 2017, 33 Siemens Charger locomotives were delivered for Amtrak Midwest. Siemens Venture coaches debuted in 2022, and will continue to be deployed in the coming years. Both the Chargers and the Ventures are owned by the Illinois Department of Transportation.

== History ==
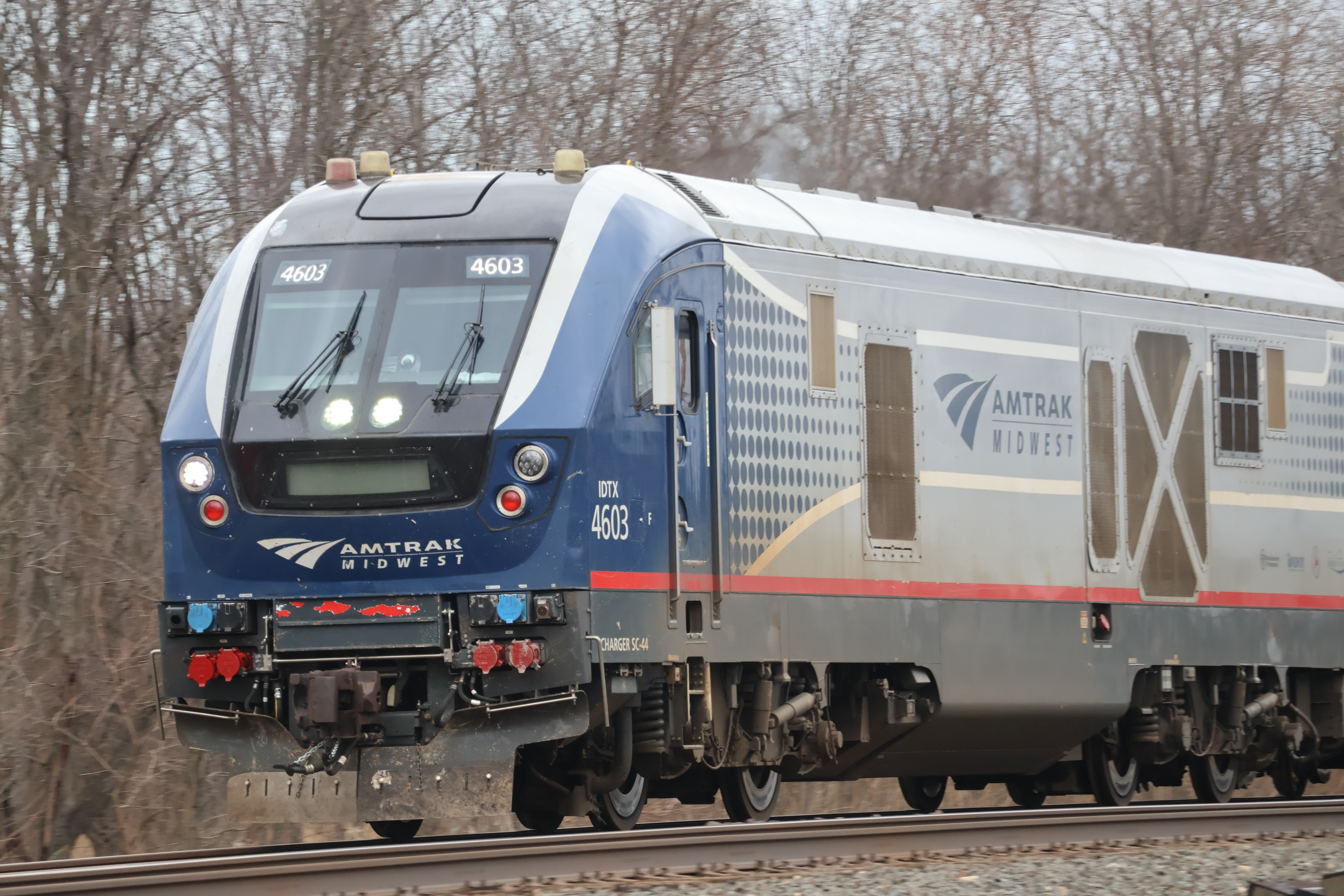
Amtrak Midwest SC-44 locomotive

The Amtrak Midwest logo and brand were unveiled in 2017 alongside the debut of Siemens Charger locomotives on the Hiawatha.

Partial restoration of Amtrak's Black Hawk between Chicago and Rockford, Illinois, was funded in 2019 and would have been part of the Amtrak Midwest network. In 2023, Metra was chosen as the operator instead of Amtrak. Metra service is expected to start in 2027 as the Rockford Intercity Passenger Rail. Restoration of the full Black Hawk beyond Rockford to Dubuque, Iowa, has yet to be determined.

== Future ==
Amtrak Midwest is slated for expansion in the coming years, with several new routes and frequencies in various stages of development. In December 2023, the Federal Railroad Administration accepted a number of Midwest routes into its Corridor Identification and Development Program. Each route in the program is granted $500,000 for service studies and is prioritized for future federal funding.

=== Planned and proposed services ===
Route	Terminus	Via	Terminus	Weekday round trips	Corridor ID Program	Status
Quad Cities	Moline	Naperville	Chicago	2	●	Service is funded and expected to start in 2027.
Prairie Marksman successor	Peoria	Joliet	Chicago	5	●	Feasibility study complete.
Hiawatha extension	Green Bay	Milwaukee	Chicago	3	●	Planning phase
Varsity successor	Madison	Milwaukee	Chicago	4	●	Planning phase
Varsity successor	Madison	Janesville	Chicago	TBD	●	Proposed, unfunded
Twin Cities 400 successor	Saint Paul	Eau Claire	Chicago	2	●	Planning phase
Illinois Zephyr and Carl Sandburg extension	Hannibal	Quincy	Chicago	2	●	Planning phase
Kentucky Cardinal	Louisville	Indianapolis	Chicago	4		Unfunded
Cardinal supplement	Cincinnati	Indianapolis	Chicago	4		Unfunded
Indianapolis–Chicago trunk	Indianapolis	Lafayette	Chicago	8 (combined)	●	Planning phase
Twin Zephyr successor	Saint Paul	Naperville	Chicago	TBD		Proposed
Cleveland-Chicago trunk	Cleveland	Elkhart	Chicago	TBD		Proposed, would supplement the Lake Shore Limited and Floridian.
Northern Lights Express	Minneapolis	Superior	Duluth	4	●	Local funding met, awaiting federal funding.
Alexandrian successor	Fargo	St. Cloud	Saint Paul	1		Feasibility study is funded. Would supplement the Empire Builder.
Wolverine extension	Detroit	Chicago	Milwaukee	TBD		Proposed
Illinois Zephyr and Carl Sandburg - Hiawatha combined	Quincy	Chicago	Milwaukee	TBD		Proposed
Total				31		

=== Additional frequencies ===
Route	New weekday round trips	Corridor ID Program	Status
Hiawatha	3	●	Planning phase
Borealis	1	●	Planning phase
Wolverine	3	●	Planning phase
Blue Water	1	●	Planning phase
Pere Marquette	2	●	Planning phase
Lincoln Service	1	●	Planning phase
Illini and Saluki	1	●	Planning phase
Total	12		

== See also ==
- Chicago Hub Network
