= Ann Rutledge (train) =

Former Amtrak rail service in the US

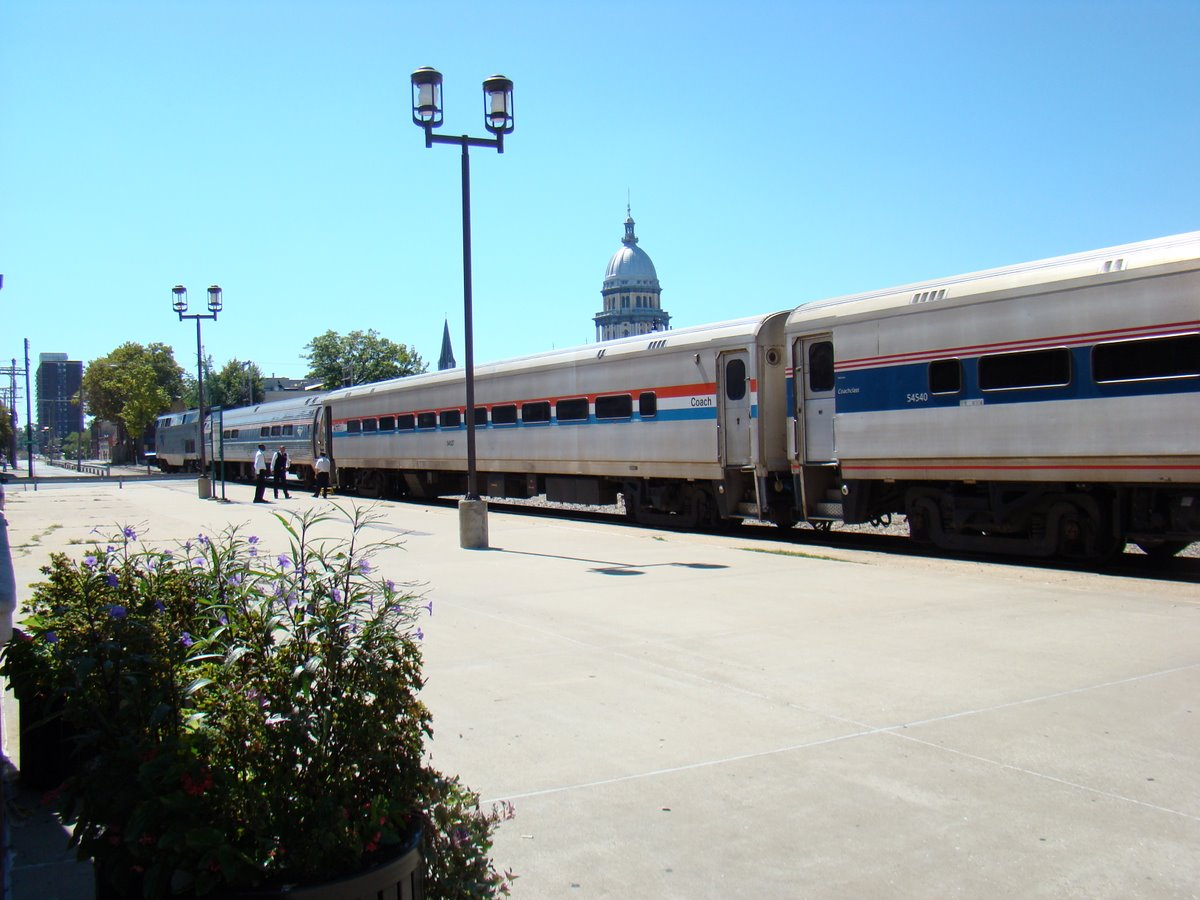
- The Ann Rutledge in Springfield, Illinois. A GE Genesis leads the train, with an Amfleet coach and two Horizon Fleet coaches visible. The Illinois Capitol building can be seen over the center car.

Overview
- Service type: Inter-city rail
- Status: Discontinued
- Locale: Midwest United States
- First service: 1937
- Last service: 2009
- Successor: Missouri River Runner
- Former operator(s): Alton Railroad, Amtrak

Route
- Termini: St. Louis, Missouri; Kansas City, Missouri
- Stops: 9
- Distance travelled: 283 mi (455 km)
- Train number(s): 313,314

On-board services
- Class(es): Business class and reserved coach
- Catering facilities: On-board café

Technical
- Rolling stock: Horizon Fleet and Amfleet coaches
- Track gauge: 4 ft 8 1/2 in (1,435 mm)
- Track owner(s): Union Pacific Railroad

The Ann Rutledge was a passenger train service operated by Amtrak running between St. Louis, Missouri, and Kansas City, Missouri, as part of the Missouri Services brand. In 2009 Amtrak consolidated the Ann Rutledge, Kansas City Mule, and the St. Louis Mule under the new name Missouri River Runner.

== History ==
=== Pre-Amtrak ===
The Alton Railroad inaugurated the Ann Rutledge in 1937 as a companion to the Abraham Lincoln over the St. Louis–Chicago route. The Alton named the train after Ann Rutledge, a woman from New Salem, Illinois, who may have been the first love of U.S. President Abraham Lincoln. The Ann Rutledge used the Lincoln's original lightweight equipment set, while the Lincoln received a matching set originally used by the Baltimore & Ohio Railroad's (B&O) Royal Blue. The Gulf, Mobile & Ohio Railroad (GM&O) continued the Ann Rutledge upon its merger with the Alton in 1947. The GM&O ended the Ann Rutledge on April 27, 1958.

=== Amtrak ===
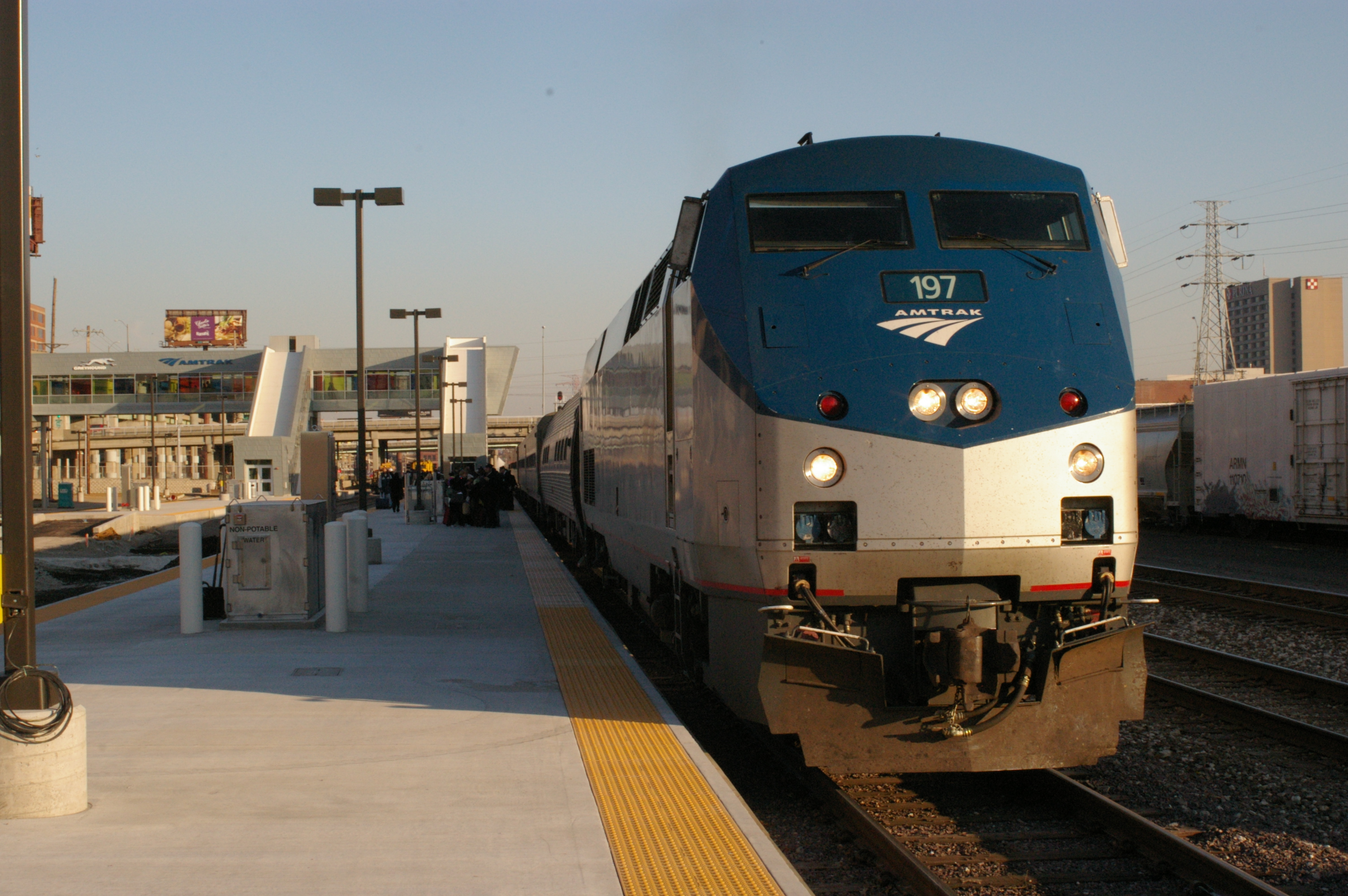
A Lincoln Service train lays over at St. Louis before continuing onward as the Ann Rutledge in 2008

Amtrak revived the name Ann Rutledge on February 15, 1976, for an Amfleet-equipped train on the St. Louis-Chicago route, replacing a Turboliner frequency. The revival proved short-lived: on October 31 Amtrak extended the Laredo-St. Louis Inter-American through to Chicago, replacing the Ann Rutledge. In a reversal of the situation with the Alton in the 1930s, Amtrak used the Ann Rutledge's Amfleet coaches to re-equip a revived Abraham Lincoln. Amtrak revived the Ann Rutledge again on October 30, 1977, replacing the Abraham Lincoln.

From its revival in 1977 until October 30, 2006, the Ann Rutledge operated as trains 303/304 along a 567-mile (912 km) route between Chicago and Kansas City via St. Louis, serving as part of both the Illinois Service and Missouri Service. On October 30, 2006, the Chicago-St. Louis State House was replaced with the Lincoln Service, and the Ann Rutledge was cut back to a St. Louis-Kansas City service. It operated as trains 313/314, connecting to Lincoln Service trains 303/304 at St. Louis. In 2009, Amtrak consolidated the Ann Rutledge, Kansas City Mule, and the St. Louis Mule under the new name Missouri River Runner.

In May 2022, Amtrak quietly returned the Chicago-Kansas City via St Louis route under the name Lincoln Service Missouri River Runner, a combination of the names of the two services.
