= Illinois Service =

Amtrak train routes in Illinois, US

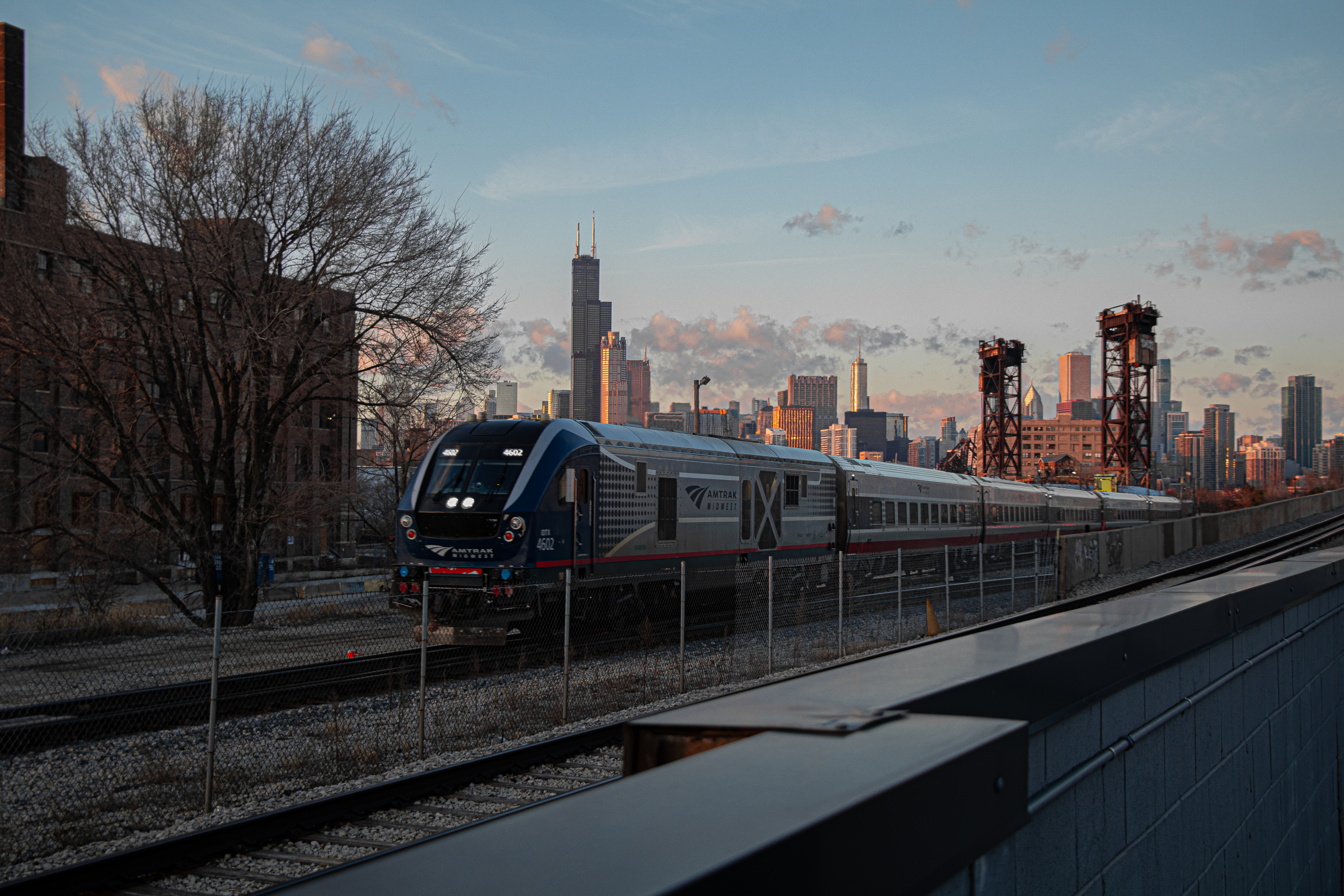
- The Chicago–St. Louis Lincoln Service, an Illinois Service train, in 2025

Overview
- Owner: Illinois Department of Transportation
- Area served: Illinois and St. Louis, Missouri
- Locale: Midwestern United States
- Transit type: Inter-city rail
- Number of lines: 3
- Website: www.amtrak.com/illinois-services-train

Operation
- Began operation: 14 November 1971; 55 years ago
- Operator: Amtrak
- Infrastructure managers: BNSF Railway; Union Pacific Railroad; Canadian National Railway

Technical
- Track gauge: 1,435 mm (4 ft 8 1/2 in) standard gauge

The Illinois Service, branded Amtrak Illinois, comprises three state-supported passenger rail routes operated by Amtrak in the American state of Illinois. The Illinois Service is funded primarily by the Illinois Department of Transportation (IDOT) and falls under the broader Amtrak Midwest brand.

Chicago Union Station is the terminus for all three Illinois Service routes, which all have multiple daily round trips:

- Chicago–Quincy: two round trips daily, the Illinois Zephyr and the Carl Sandburg
- Chicago–St. Louis Lincoln Service: four round trips daily and the only route that travels at a top speed of 110 mph. One round trip is a combined train with the Missouri River Runner
- Chicago–Carbondale: two round trips daily, the Illini and the Saluki, and the only route that uses Superliner equipment

These round trips are supplemented by some of Amtrak's long-distance passenger trains, however, these trains do not stop at all the stations served by state-supported routes. The California Zephyr and Southwest Chief supplement the Illinois Zephyr/Carl Sandburg (only as far as Galesburg), the Texas Eagle supplements the Lincoln Service, and the City of New Orleans supplements the Illini/Saluki.

All routes feature coach class and business class accommodations plus cafe car service. Routes that don't use Superliner equipment have free on-board WiFi.

The Chicago–Milwaukee Hiawatha is not part of the Illinois Service as it is jointly-supported by both IDOT and the Wisconsin Department of Transportation (WIsDOT), but it is part of the overall Amtrak Midwest brand.

== Proposed expansion ==
Two proposed Illinois Service routes have been accepted by the Corridor Identification and Development Program, both in December 2023:

- Chicago–Peoria Prairie Marksman via Joliet, Morris, Ottawa, and LaSalle-Peru
- Chicago–Moline Quad Cities: uses the existing Chicago–Quincy route between Chicago and Princeton, branching from it west of Wyanet to serve the Quad Cities via Geneseo

The Quad Cities and the Rockford–Chicago portion of the Black Hawk were to have been added in late 2015 but were put on hold by then-Governor Bruce Rauner. They were resurrected and funded in 2019 as part of a transportation bill supported by Governor J.B. Pritzker. In 2023, Pritzker announced that the Rockford–Chicago train will be operated by Metra.

In addition to the two new routes, a committee was formed in late 2021 to study and promote extending the Chicago–Quincy route to Hannibal, Missouri.

== Equipment ==
IDOT has funded the procurement of Siemens Charger SC-44 locomotives and Siemens Venture passenger cars for the Illinois Service. The new equipment debuted in 2022 and are primarily seen on the Lincoln Service and Illinois Zephyr/Carl Sandburg. Each locomotive has a reporting mark of "IDTX" to indicate it is IDOT-owned equipment rather general Amtrak equipment.

The Illini/Saluki, however, use Superliner passenger cars rather than Siemens Venture passenger cars due to an axle and weight requirement imposed by host railroad Canadian National (CN). This issue is expected to be addressed by installing onboard shunt enhancers on Siemens equipment.

The Illinois Service trains previously and still occasionally use a combination of GE Genesis P-42 locomotives, Amfleet passenger cars, and Horizon passenger cars.

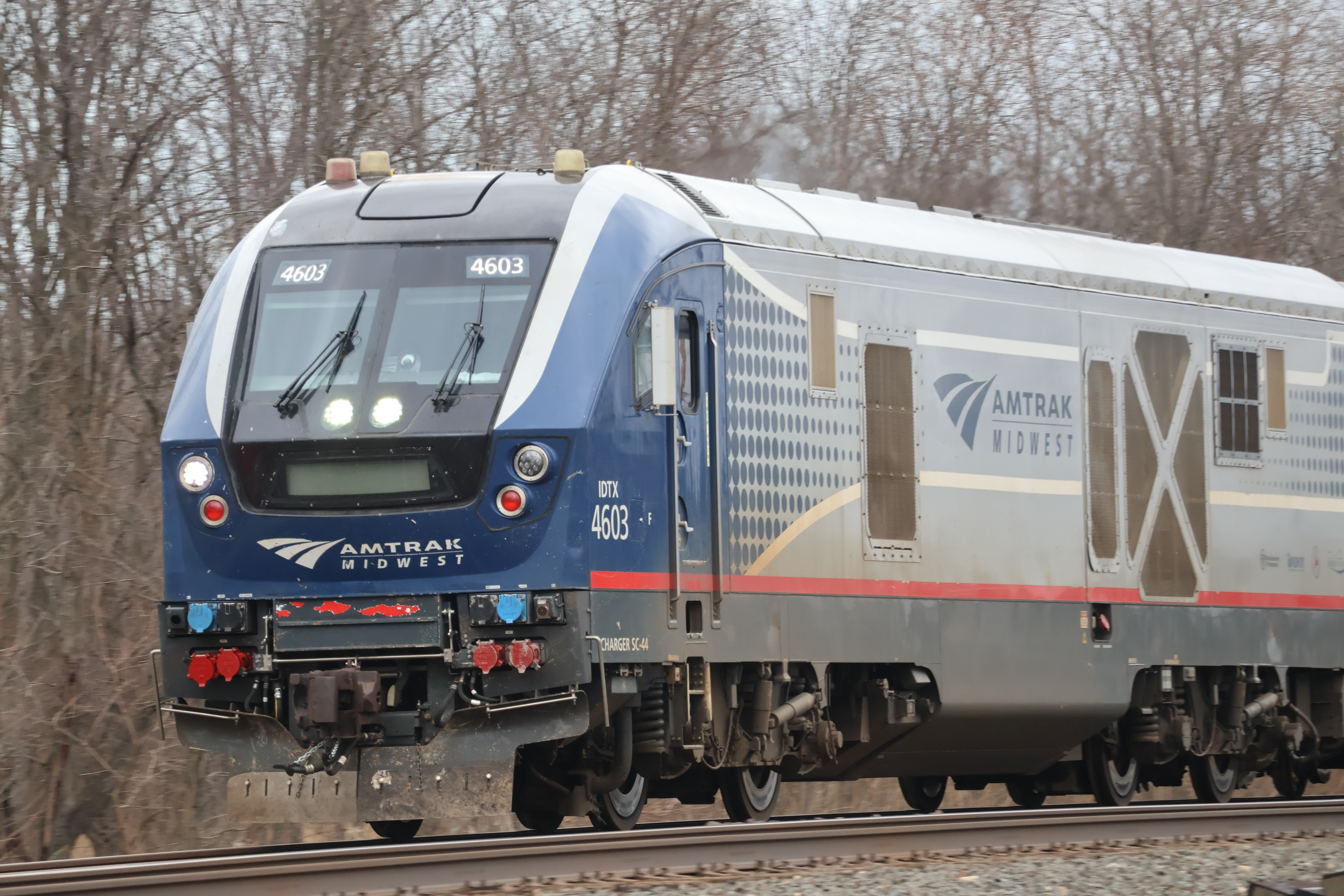
Siemens Charger SC-44 locomotive

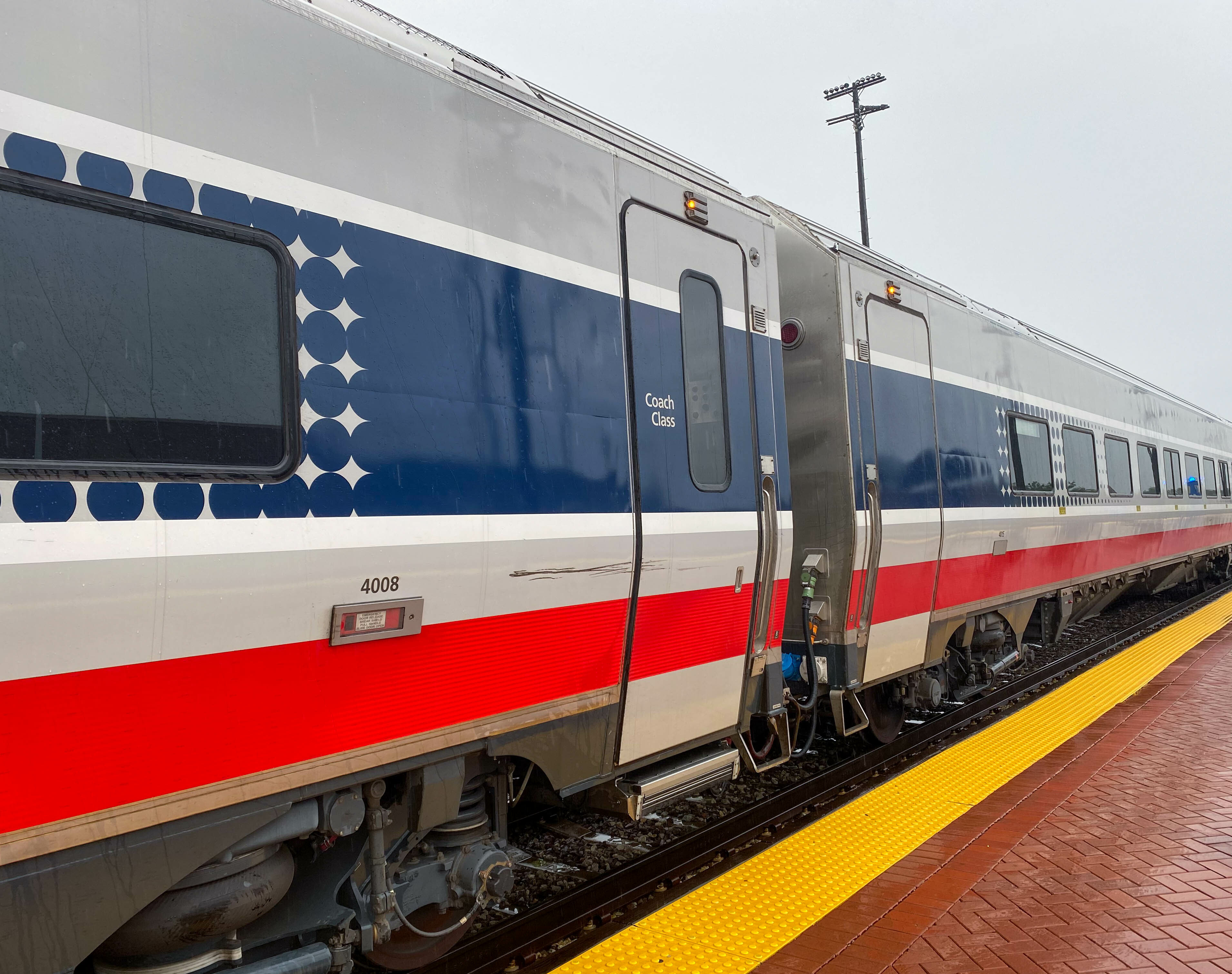
Siemens Venture passenger cars

== See also ==
- Hiawatha
