= Washington station (Missouri) =

Train station in Washington, Missouri, US

Washington, MO
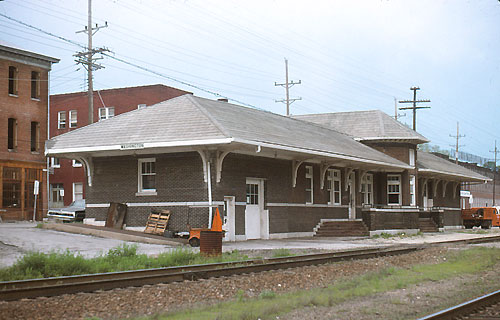
- Washington station in May 1975

General information
- Location: 301 West Front Street; Washington, Missouri; United States
- Coordinates: 38.5616°N 91.0125°W
- Owner: City of Washington, Union Pacific
- Platforms: 1 side platform
- Tracks: 2

Construction
- Parking: About 30 spaces
- Cycle facilities: None
- Accessible: Yes

Other information
- Station code: Amtrak: WAH

History
- Opened: Pre-1865
- Rebuilt: 1923

Passengers
- FY 2025: 17,021 (Amtrak)

Services
Preceding station	Amtrak	Following station
Hermann toward Kansas City	Missouri River Runner	Kirkwood toward St. Louis
Former services
Preceding station	Missouri Pacific Railroad	Following station
Berger toward Kansas City	Main Line	Boles toward St. Louis
Location

Washington station is an Amtrak intercity train station in Washington, Missouri, United States. It is served by the Missouri River Runner.

== History ==
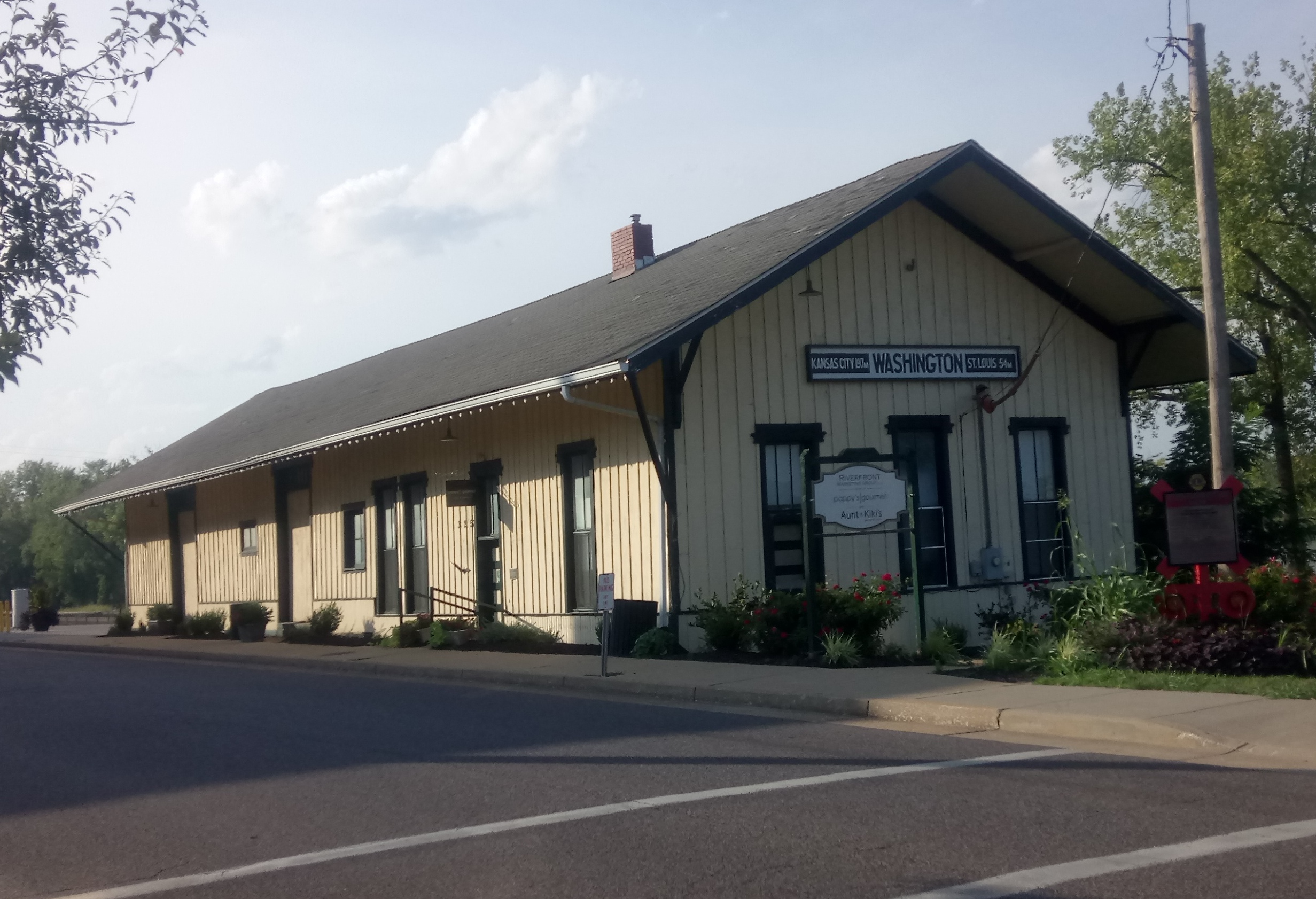
The original station building in 2017

The brick station was designed for the Missouri Pacific Railroad by the railroad's Chief Engineer E. M. Tucker and built in 1923. The wooden depot built in 1865 which it replaced was moved and became the Missouri Pacific freight station. Both stations still stand.

On November 9, 2022, Amtrak announced that it would be investing $3 million to improve the station. The work will add a new 170-foot platform, new lighting and new signage to the station. The parking lot and the building will remain unchanged.
