= El Dorado station =

- El Dorado Missouri Pacific Depot
- U.S. National Register of Historic Places
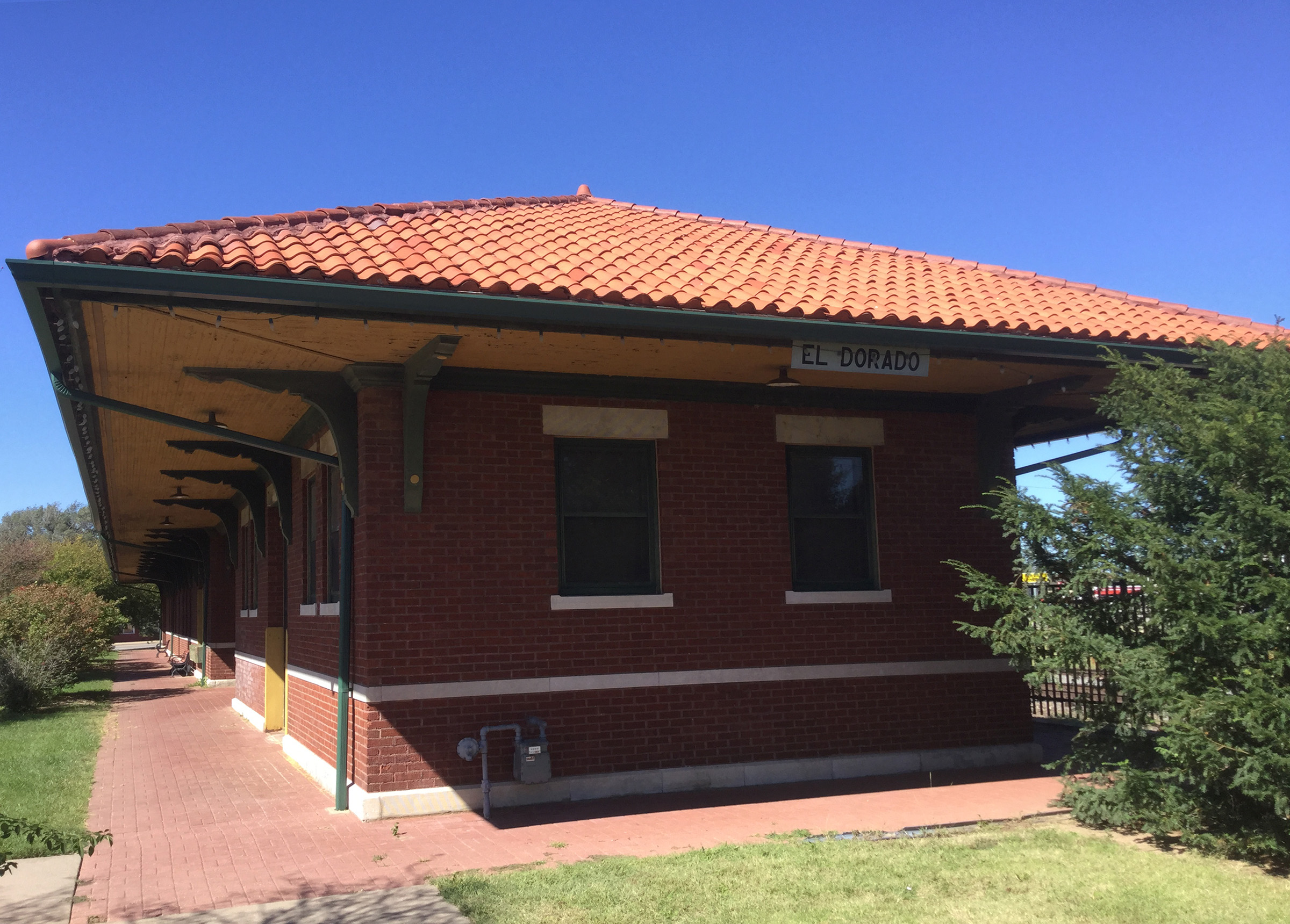

- Location within Kansas Location within the United States
- Location: 430 N. Main St., El Dorado, Kansas
- Coordinates: 37°49′18″N 96°50′57″W
- Built: 1918
- Architect: E. M. Tucker
- Architectural style: Mission/Spanish Colonial Revival
- NRHP reference No.: 94000429
- Added to NRHP: May 6, 1994

The El Dorado Missouri Pacific Depot is a former passenger train station in El Dorado, Kansas, United States. It is a one-story, red-brick structure with a red-tile roof and wide, overhanging eaves designed by E. M. Tucker, Chief Engineer of the Missouri Pacific, in the Mission architectural style.

== History ==
Constructed in 1918 for $400,000, the depot served the Missouri Pacific Railroad, on a freight-passenger line that ran east from Wichita to El Dorado then on to Eureka Yates Center, Durand, Iola, Moran, Bronson, and Ft. Scott. The depot replaced an 1880s depot. Passenger service ended in 1958.

It was added to the National Register of Historic Places in 1994.

== See also ==
- National Register of Historic Places listings in Butler County, Kansas
