= State-supported Amtrak routes =

Intercity train routes in the United States

State Supported Service Line
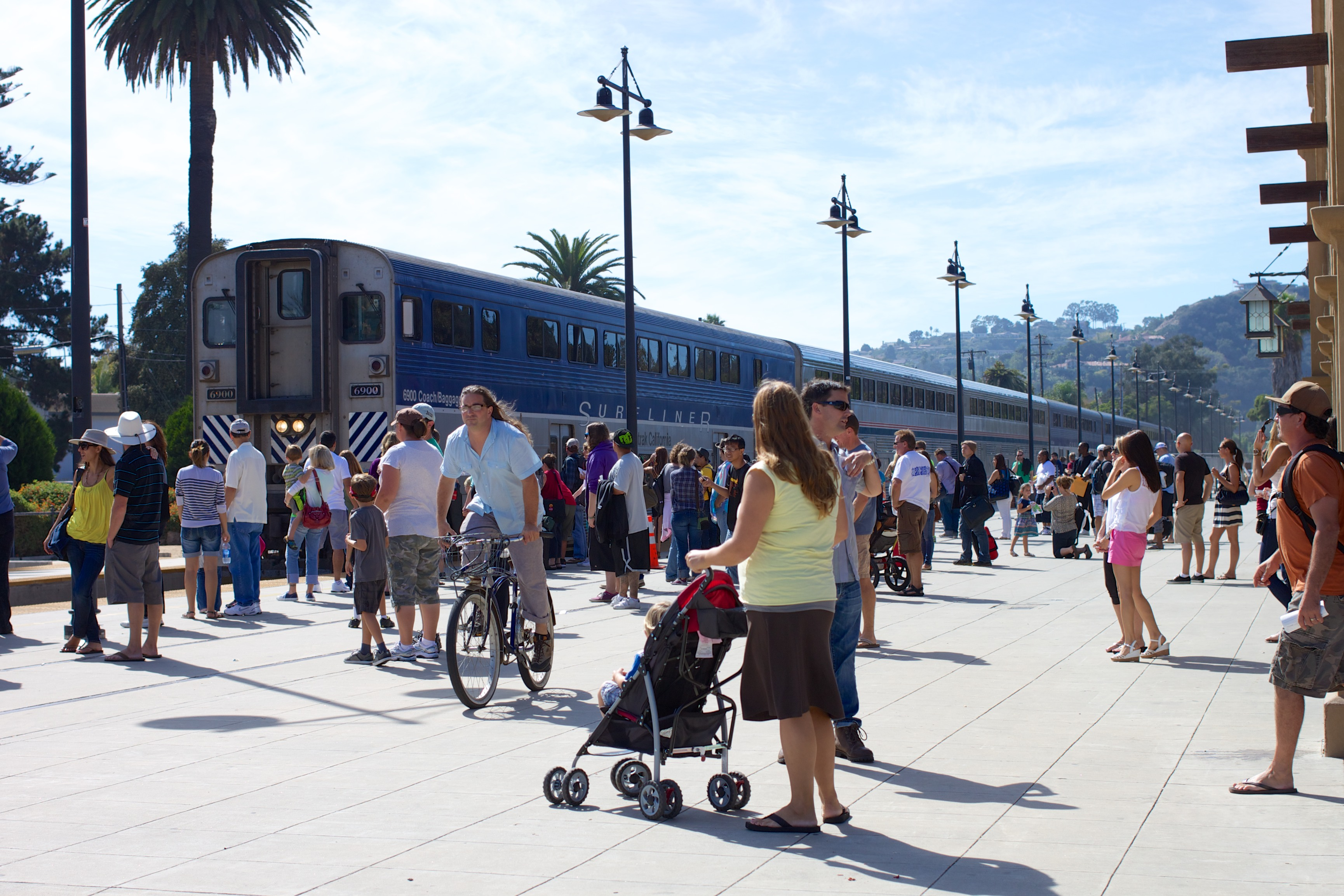
- The Pacific Surfliner, Amtrak's most popular state-supported train, funded by Caltrans

Overview
- Locale: Contiguous United States
- Transit type: Inter-city rail
- Number of lines: 32

Operation
- Operator: Amtrak

Technical
- Track gauge: 4 ft 8 1/2 in (1,435 mm) standard gauge
- Top speed: 125 mph (201 km/h)

The State Supported Service Line is the division of Amtrak responsible for operating its intercity passenger train services shorter than 750 miles (1,210 km) outside the Northeast Corridor. Since 2008, federal law has required routes of this length to be financially sponsored by state or regional transportation authorities. As of 2026, there are 32 state-supported routes sponsored by 23 partners in 20 states.

State-supported trains are typically faster and more frequent than Amtrak's long-distance routes, and are said to be competitive with flying and driving. The division is Amtrak's largest by ridership, representing about half of all passenger trips, and is also its fastest growing in the 2020s.

Nearly all new Amtrak routes inaugurated since 2008 have been state-supported. The company's newest route, the Mardi Gras Service, first ran in August 2025 with funding from the Southern Rail Commission. Amtrak sees state-supported routes as its greatest opportunity for expansion, though its plans depend on state cooperation. State budget cuts can also result in routes being downgraded or discontinued.

== History ==
The modern state-supported route system is a consequence of Section 209 of the Passenger Rail Investment and Improvement Act of 2008.

== Routes ==
Name		Partners	Route	Miles (km)
Adirondack		NYSDOT	Montreal – New York	381 (613)
Amtrak Cascades		WSDOT, ODOT	Vancouver – Eugene	467 (752)
Hartford Line		MassDOT, CTDOT	Springfield – New Haven	63 (101)
Valley Flyer		MassDOT, CTDOT	Greenfield – New Haven	102 (164)
Vermonter		VTrans, MassDOT, CTDOT	St. Albans – Washington	611 (983)
Berkshire Flyer		MassDOT, NYSDOT	New York – Pittsfield	190 (310)
Michigan Services	Blue Water	MDOT	Chicago – Port Huron	319 (513)
Michigan Services	Pere Marquette	MDOT	Chicago – Grand Rapids	176 (283)
Michigan Services	Wolverine	MDOT	Chicago – Pontiac	304 (489)
Borealis		MnDOT, WisDOT, IDOT	Saint Paul – Chicago	417 (671)
Amtrak California	Capitol Corridor	Capitol Corridor Joint Powers Authority, Caltrans	Auburn – San Jose	172 (277)
Amtrak California	Gold Runner	San Joaquin Joint Powers Authority, Caltrans	Oakland – Bakersfield	318 (512)
Amtrak California	Gold Runner	San Joaquin Joint Powers Authority, Caltrans	Sacramento – Bakersfield	280 (450)
Amtrak California	Pacific Surfliner	LOSSAN, Caltrans	San Luis Obispo – San Diego	350 (560)
NC By Train	Carolinian	NCDOT	New York – Charlotte	704 (1,133)
NC By Train	Piedmont	NCDOT	Raleigh – Charlotte	173 (278)
Downeaster		Northern New England Passenger Rail Authority	Brunswick – Boston	145 (233)
Empire Service		NYSDOT	New York – Niagara Falls	460 (740)
Maple Leaf		NYSDOT	New York – Toronto	544 (875)
Ethan Allen Express		VTrans, NYSDOT	New York – Burlington	308 (496)
Heartland Flyer		ODOT, TxDOT	Oklahoma City – Fort Worth	206 (332)
Hiawatha		WisDOT, IDOT	Chicago – Milwaukee	86 (138)
Illinois Service	Illini and Saluki	IDOT	Chicago – Carbondale	310 (500)
Illinois Service	Illinois Zephyr and Carl Sandburg	IDOT	Chicago – Quincy	258 (415)
Illinois Service	Lincoln Service	IDOT	Chicago – St. Louis	284 (457)
Keystone Service		PennDOT	New York – Harrisburg	195 (314)
Pennsylvanian		PennDOT	New York – Pittsburgh	444 (715)
Mardi Gras Service		Southern Rail Commission	New Orleans – Mobile	145 (233)
Missouri River Runner		MoDOT	St. Louis – Kansas City	283 (455)
Amtrak Virginia		Virginia Passenger Rail Authority	Boston – Newport News	644 (1,036)
Amtrak Virginia		Virginia Passenger Rail Authority	Boston – Norfolk	679 (1,093)
Amtrak Virginia		Virginia Passenger Rail Authority	Boston – Roanoke	682 (1,098)
Winter Park Express		CDOT	Denver – Winter Park Resort	62 (100)
