= Jefferson City station =

Amtrak station in Jefferson City, Missouri

Jefferson City, MO
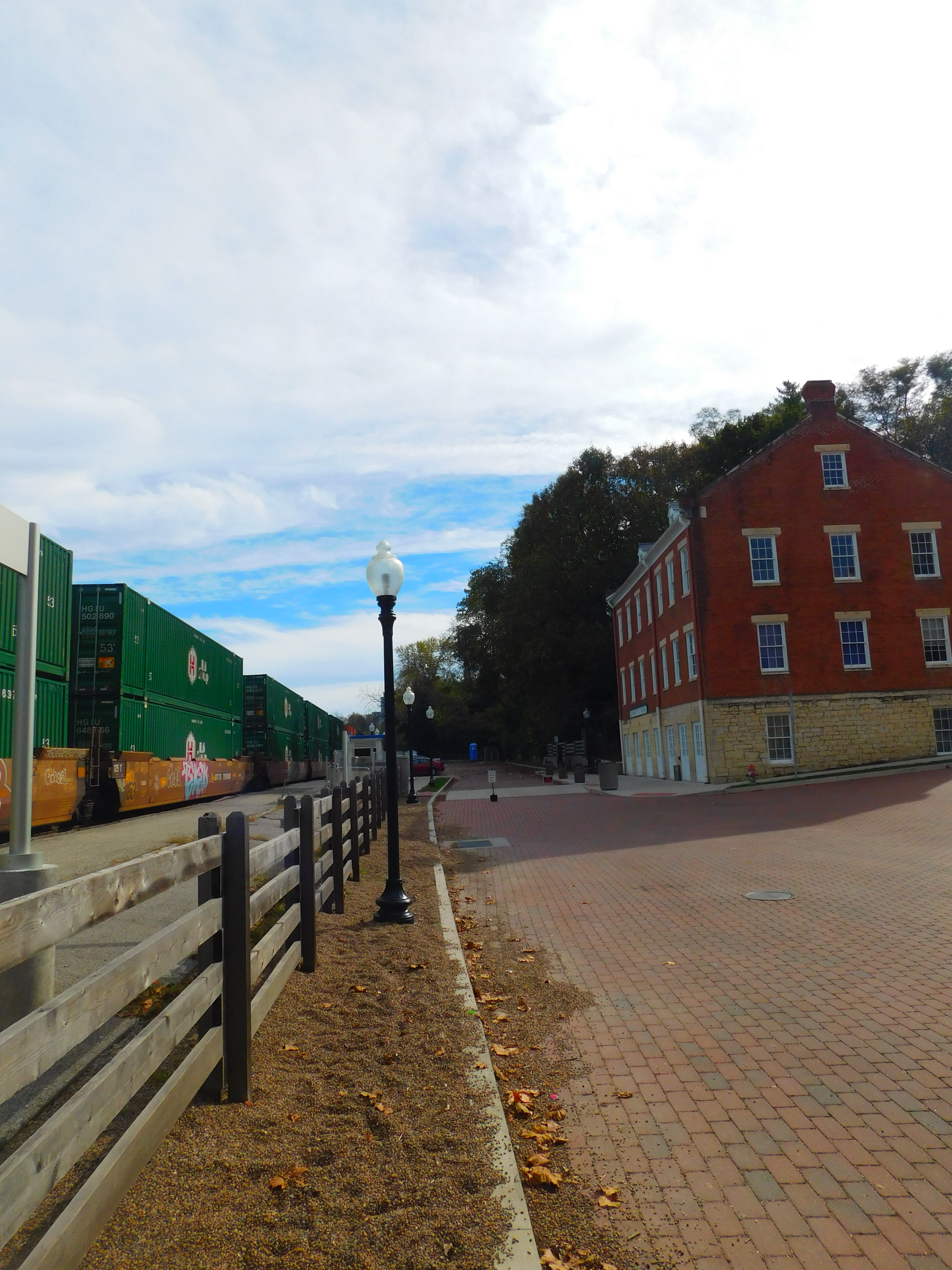
- Jefferson City station in November 2016. A Union Pacific Railway freight train is stopped next to the platform.

General information
- Location: 101 Jefferson Street; Jefferson City, Missouri; United States
- Coordinates: 38.5787°N 92.1700°W
- Owner: National Park Service
- Platforms: 1 side platform
- Tracks: 2

Construction
- Accessible: Yes

Other information
- Station code: Amtrak: JEF

History
- Opened: 1855
- Rebuilt: 1984

Passengers
- FY 2025: 41,196 (Amtrak)

Services
Preceding station	Amtrak	Following station
Sedalia toward Kansas City	Missouri River Runner	Hermann toward St. Louis
Former services
Preceding station	Amtrak	Following station
Sedalia toward Kansas City	National Limited	Kirkwood toward New York or Washington, D.C.
Preceding station	Missouri Pacific Railroad	Following station
Cole toward Kansas City	Main Line	Osage toward St. Louis
Russellville, MO toward Bagnell	Jefferson City - Bagnell	Terminus
Location

Jefferson City is an Amtrak train station in Jefferson City, Missouri, United States. The station is located on the ground floor of the former Union Hotel, which was built in 1855 and is part of the Jefferson Landing State Historic Site. It has functioned as Jefferson City's station since 1984; previously, Amtrak used the former Missouri Pacific Railroad station, two blocks to the east. The station is a stop for the St. Louis–Kansas City Missouri River Runner, which has two daily round trips.

The entire Union Hotel building (including the station) was closed on October 2, 2019, after a bulge appeared in its north wall, sparking concerns that its exterior masonry was no longer structurally sound. In December 2019, a temporary station was established in a nearby parking lot using a modular trailer. As of December 2021, funding for a $9 million project to stabilize and modernize the building was waiting to be appropriated in the state's FY23 budget by the Missouri General Assembly, and it was hoped that the project could start in July 2022. While the bulge in the building's wall has not significantly worsened, the building remains closed and was placed on Missouri Preservation's "2021 Places in Peril" list.

In September 2023, Amtrak—who does not own the building—completed a $3 million project to upgrade the station's platform. The project replaced the platform's asphalt surface with concrete, brought it into compliance with ADA, and added new historically-accurate lighting fixtures.

== See also ==
- List of Amtrak stations
