= Mules (train) =

Pair of passenger trains running in Missouri

Kansas City Mule St. Louis Mule
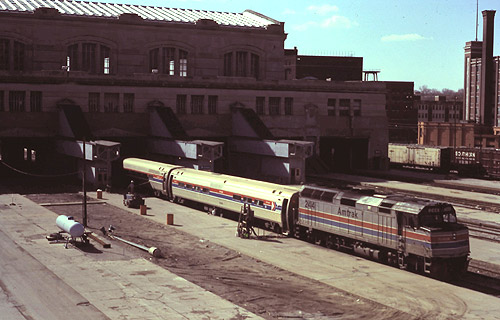
- Mule at Kansas City Union Station in 1981

Overview
- Service type: Inter-city rail
- Status: Discontinued
- Locale: Missouri
- First service: October 26, 1980
- Last service: January 27, 2009
- Successor: Missouri River Runner
- Former operator: Amtrak

Route
- Termini: Kansas City, Missouri; St. Louis, Missouri
- Stops: 8
- Distance travelled: 283 mi (455.44 km)
- Average journey time: 5 hours 50 minutes
- Service frequency: Daily
- Train numbers: 311, 358 (Kansas City Mule); 316, 359 (St. Louis Mule)

On-board services
- Classes: Business class; Reserved coach
- Catering facilities: On-board cafe

Technical
- Rolling stock: Amfleet and Horizon coaches
- Track gauge: 4 ft 8 1/2 in (1,435 mm)
- Track owner: Union Pacific Railroad

The Kansas City Mule and St. Louis Mule were a pair of 283-mile (455 km) passenger trains operated by Amtrak running between St. Louis and Kansas City, Missouri as part of the Missouri Service train network. Also operating over this route was the Ann Rutledge, which originated in Chicago. In January 2009, Amtrak consolidated these trains under the name Missouri River Runner.

== History ==
Amtrak introduced the two trains on October 26, 1980, in partnership with the state of Missouri, which provided a yearly subsidy of $484,000. It ran along a route that had been served for most of the 20th century by the Missouri Pacific Railroad. In July 1971, the route became the western leg of Amtrak's National Limited, which ran from New York City to Kansas City. That train, in turn, was the successor of the famed Spirit of St. Louis, which had run from 1927 to 1971.

The National Limited was discontinued due to budget cuts in 1979, reducing service along the St. Louis-Kansas City corridor to just one train, the Ann Rutledge, which ran from Chicago to Kansas City via St. Louis. Missouri officials wanted to maintain the same level of service between the state's two major cities, and urged Amtrak to preserve a regional service for the state to supplement the Ann Rutledge.

Although the two trains shared the same route, the eastbound train was known as the St. Louis Mule while the westbound train was called the Kansas City Mule. Contemporary news accounts referred to the combined service as the "Missouri Mule", although Amtrak timetables used the individual names.

The Mules originally stopped at Kirkwood, Jefferson City, Sedalia and Warrensburg. Amtrak added Lee's Summit and Washington as flag stops in April 1981 on a one-year trial basis; Lee's Summit was retained in 1982 while Washington was dropped late 1981 in favor of Independence. Amtrak reinstated Washington on the October 29, 1995, timetable for another one-year trial period; this time Amtrak retained the stop. Hermann became a permanent stop on September 28, 1991. Trains had previously stopped only during Hermann's annual Maifest and Octoberfest.

Between April 29, 1984, and November 4, 1993, the Mules operated with the River Cities, a Kansas City section of the City of New Orleans. Eastbound trains split from the St. Louis Mule and continued to Carbondale, Illinois to connect with the New Orleans-bound train. Westbound trains split from the northbound City of New Orleans at Carbondale and continued to St. Louis, where they joined the Kansas City Mule. A funding crisis caused Amtrak to discontinue the Mules between April 1 and July 1, 1995.

Because the tracks were owned by Union Pacific (UP), which acquired MoPac in 1983, freight trains had priority over passenger trains. This often resulted in severe delays for Amtrak, such as those seen in May 2007, when the Missouri Department of Transportation blamed UP for the disruptions.
