= Kirkwood station (Missouri) =

Amtrak station in Kirkwood, Missouri

Kirkwood, MO
- Kirkwood station in October 2016

General information
- Location: 110 West Argonne Drive; Kirkwood, Missouri; United States
- Coordinates: 38.5809°N 90.4068°W
- Owner: City of Kirkwood
- Platforms: 1 side platform, 1 island platform
- Tracks: 2

Construction
- Accessible: Yes

Other information
- Station code: Amtrak: KWD

History
- Opened: 1853
- Rebuilt: 1863, 1893

Passengers
- FY 2025: 59,959 (Amtrak)

Services
Preceding station	Amtrak	Following station
Washington toward Kansas City	Missouri River Runner	St. Louis Terminus
Former services
Preceding station	Amtrak	Following station
Jefferson City toward Kansas City	National Limited	St. Louis–Union Station toward New York or Washington, D.C.
Preceding station	Missouri Pacific Railroad	Following station
Barrett toward Kansas City	Main Line	Webster Groves toward St. Louis
- Kirkwood Missouri Pacific Depot
- U.S. National Register of Historic Places
- Area: less than one acre
- Architect: Douglas Donovan
- Architectural style: Late Victorian
- NRHP reference No.: 85001476
- Added to NRHP: July 5, 1985
Location

Kirkwood station is an Amtrak train station in Kirkwood, Missouri, United States. It is served by the Missouri River Runner. The 1893-built station building was added to the National Register of Historic Places in 1985 as the Kirkwood Missouri Pacific Depot.

== History ==
Kirkwood station in 1973

In 1851, the land where the current station is located (Argonne Avenue and Kirkwood Road) was obtained from Owen Collins by the Pacific Railroad for a right of way. The track for the Pacific Railroad to Kirkwood was completed in 1853. The first train arrived May 11, 1853, for an auction sale of lots, making Kirkwood the first planned suburb west of the Mississippi. The town was named for the chief engineer for the railroad, James P. Kirkwood.

In 1863, a frame depot was built. Here members of the first school board met to draft the charter of the Kirkwood School District, which was granted in 1865. In 1893, Douglas Donovan was hired by the Missouri Pacific Railroad to construct the current stone station to replace the wooden station. The current station remains today as an outstanding example of Richardsonian Romanesque architecture.

Commuter trains ran to and from Kirkwood until 1961. A train turn-table was located near the present Farmers Market for the engines to be turned for the return trip to St. Louis and for the helper engines, which were used to help freight trains manage the "Kirkwood Hill," prior to the arrival of diesel engines. Though originally deemed ineligible for such status, the station was listed on the National Register of Historic Places on July 5, 1985.

On November 9, 2022, Amtrak announced plans to renovate the station. A $5.7 million station renovation project replaced the slate roof, installed a new geothermal heating and cooling system, and renovated the interior with new restrooms and seating areas. The work was completed in September 2026.
