= Horizon (railcar) =

Single-level passenger railcar model

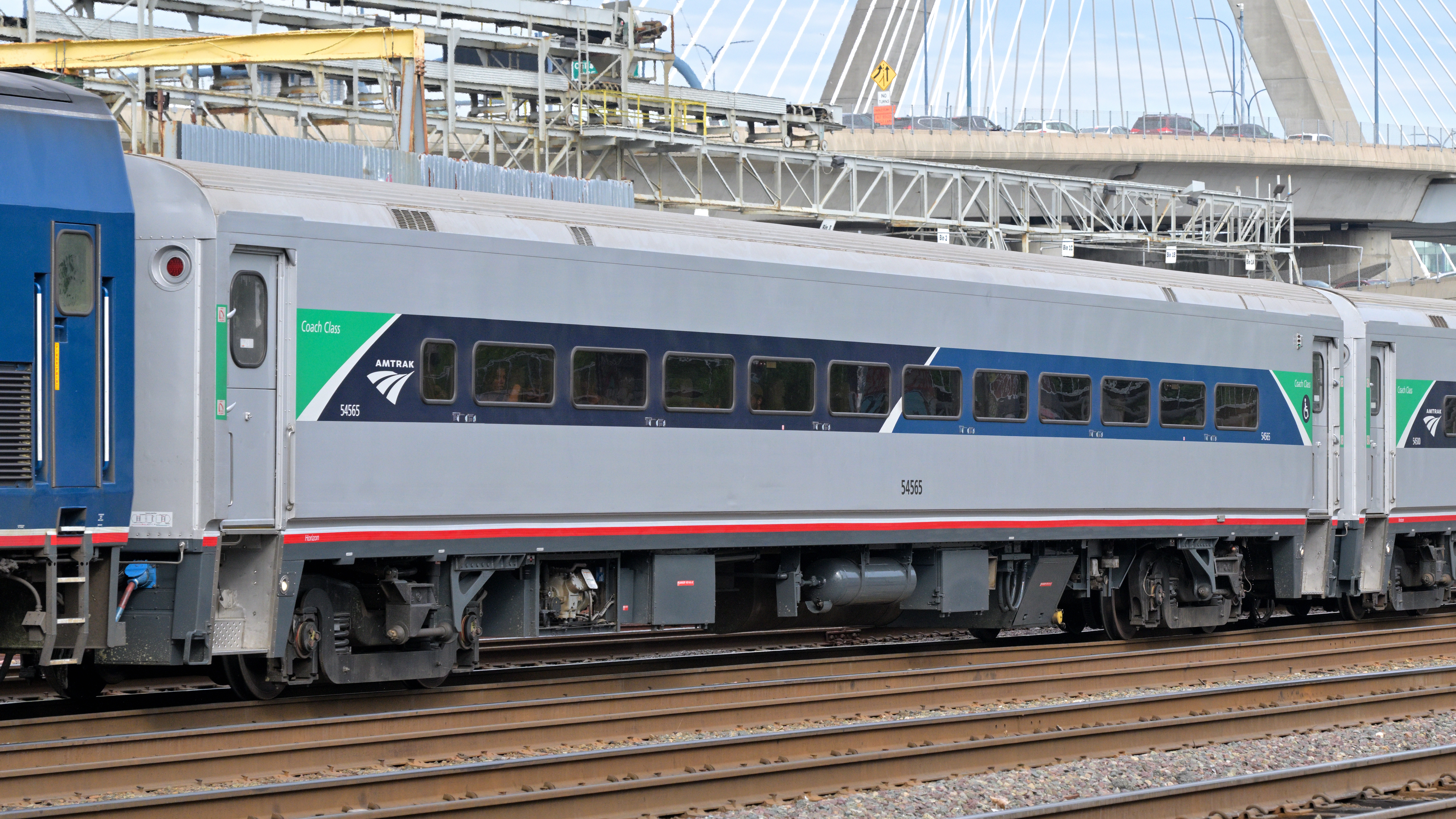
- Repaired Horizon cars on the Downeaster in June 2026

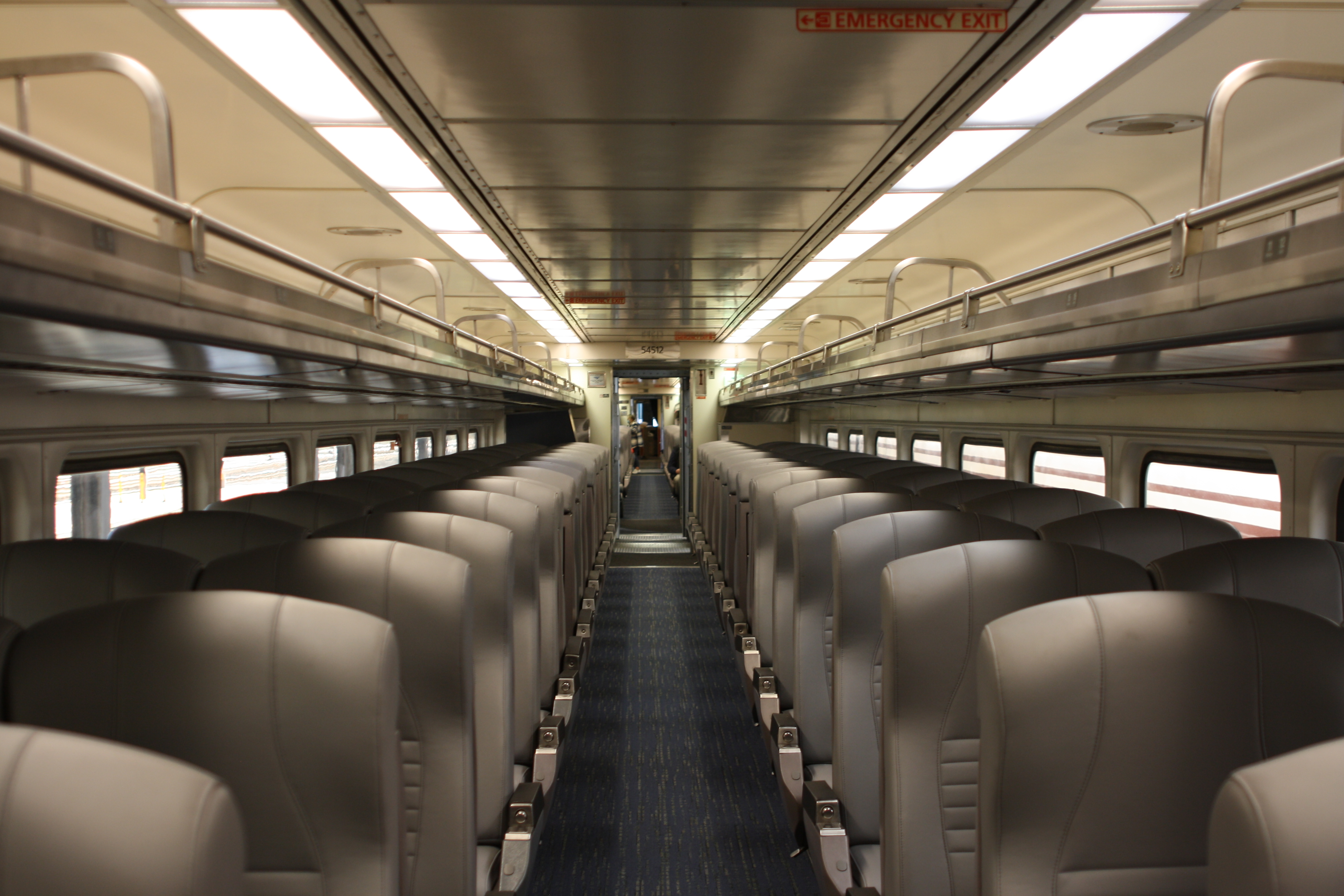
- The interior of a Horizon coach in 2020
- In service: 1989–2025, 2026–present
- Manufacturer: Bombardier Transportation
- Family name: Comet
- Constructed: 1988–1990
- Number built: 86 coaches, 18 food service cars
- Operator: Amtrak
- Depots: Boston, Chicago, Seattle
- Lines served: Blue Water; Borealis; Carl Sandburg; Cascades; Downeaster; Hiawatha; Illini; Illinois Zephyr; Lincoln Service; Missouri River Runner; Saluki; Wolverine

Specifications
- Car body construction: Aluminum
- Car length: 85 ft (25.91 m)
- Width: 10 ft (3.05 m)
- Height: 13 ft (3.96 m)
- Floor height: 51 in (1,300 mm)
- Platform height: High: 51 in (1,300 mm); Low: 22.5 in (570 mm)
- Doors: 2 manually operated dutch doors per side
- Maximum speed: 125 mph (201 km/h)
- Power supply: Head end power (480 V AC at 60 Hz)
- Bogies: General Steel Industries GSI-G70
- Braking system: Air
- Coupling system: Janney Type H Tightlock
- Track gauge: 4 ft 8 1/2 in (1,435 mm) standard gauge

Horizon cars are single-level intercity passenger railcars used by Amtrak, the national rail operator in the United States. Built between 1988 and 1990 by Bombardier Transportation, the Horizon fleet consists of 104 cars configured as standard coaches and food service cars. Designed for short-distance corridor service, the cars were based on the Comet commuter railcars, but modified for intercity travel. The Horizon fleet has been primarily assigned to routes in the Midwest. In March 2025, the cars were withdrawn from service due to corrosion issues. Two cars re-entered service in June 2026.

== History ==
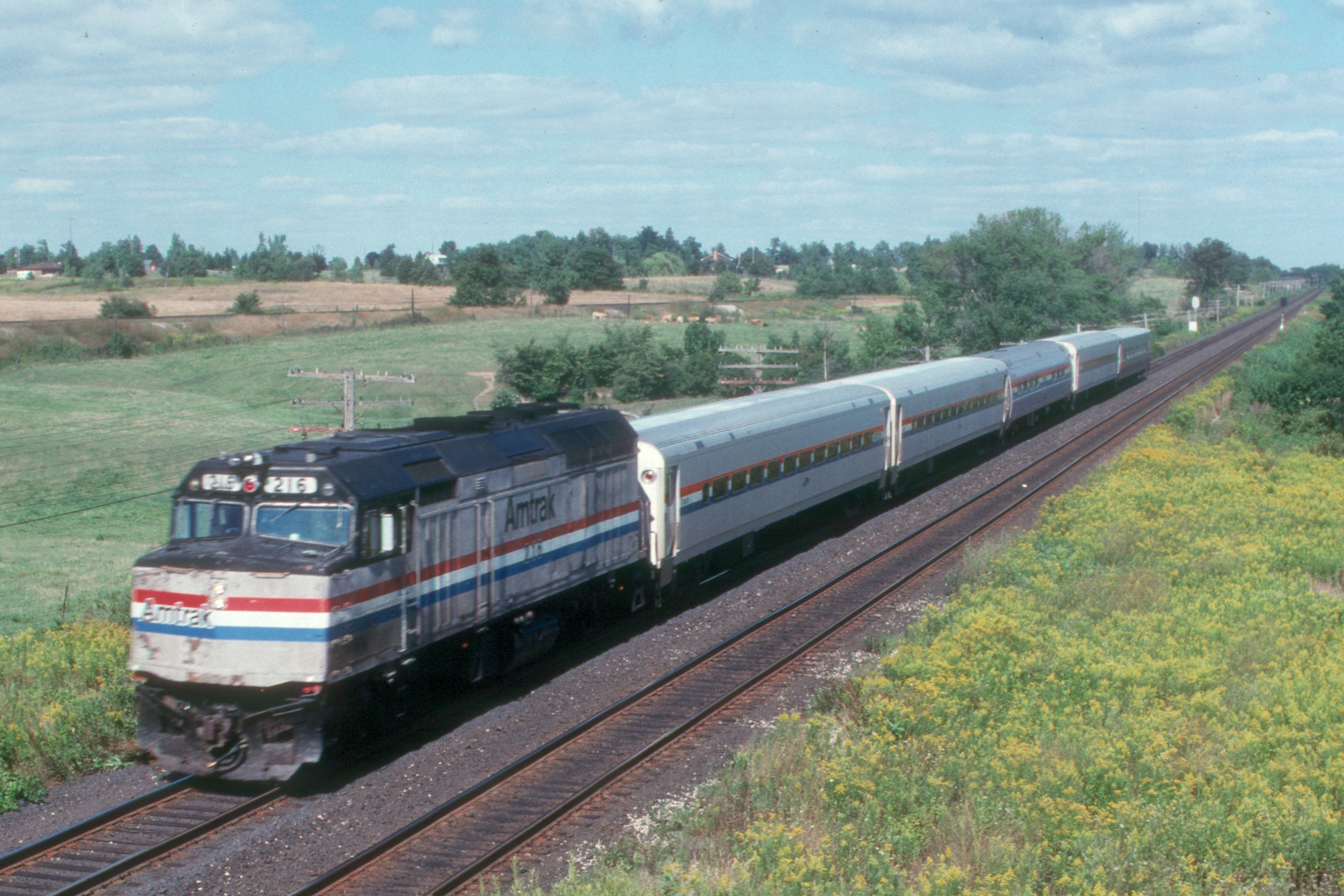
Horizon cars on the International in 1989

Amtrak contracted with Bombardier in 1988 to build 104 passenger cars derived from the Comet design, which Bombardier was already producing for commuter rail agencies. The arrangement allowed for rapid delivery and avoided the need for federal funding, making the Horizon fleet the first Amtrak passenger cars procured entirely through private financing.

Bombardier assembled the cars in Barre, Vermont, delivering them between 1989 and spring 1990. The order consisted of 86 coaches and 18 cars with food service areas. The first cars entered revenue service in April 1989.

Amtrak considered ordering 23 additional Horizon cars in 1994 to replace its fleet of troublesome gas- turbine-powered Turboliner trainsets on the Empire Corridor, but the order was never finalized.

On March 26, 2025, Amtrak withdrew all Horizon cars from service after corrosion issues were discovered during inspections of a batch of ten cars sent to an Alstom facility in Kanona, New York. The withdrawal disrupted service on several routes while Amtrak repositioned replacement equipment. Additional Horizon cars were sent to Kanona for evaluation in May and September 2025.

As of December 2025, Amtrak stated that some Horizon cars had been identified as repairable and were undergoing repairs, with Amtrak president Roger Harris expressing hope that several cars could return to service in early 2026.

Two Horizon cars were released back into service on the Downeaster in June 2026 following repairs. As of July 2026, Amtrak plans to repair a total of 16 cars.

== Design ==
The Horizon cars were derived from the Comet II commuter railcar design, which itself was based on the original Comet I cars built by Pullman-Standard between 1970 and 1973. For the Horizon, Bombardier adapted the design for intercity operation with revised interiors and additional passenger amenities for longer-distance travel.

The cars ride on General Steel Industries GSI-G70 outboard-bearing trucks and are capable of speeds up to 125 miles per hour (201 km/h).

The fleet included 72 standard coaches with seating capacities between 76 and 82 passengers, along with 14 accessible coaches that seated 72 passengers and included wheelchair spaces. All 86 coaches were later retrofitted for accessibility, reducing seating capacity to between 68 and 72 passengers.

The 18 food service cars were built in two configurations. Café/club cars included table seating for 32 passengers and 19 Business Class seats, while dinette cars seated 48 passengers at tables. Both configurations included a centrally located food service counter.

== Routes served ==
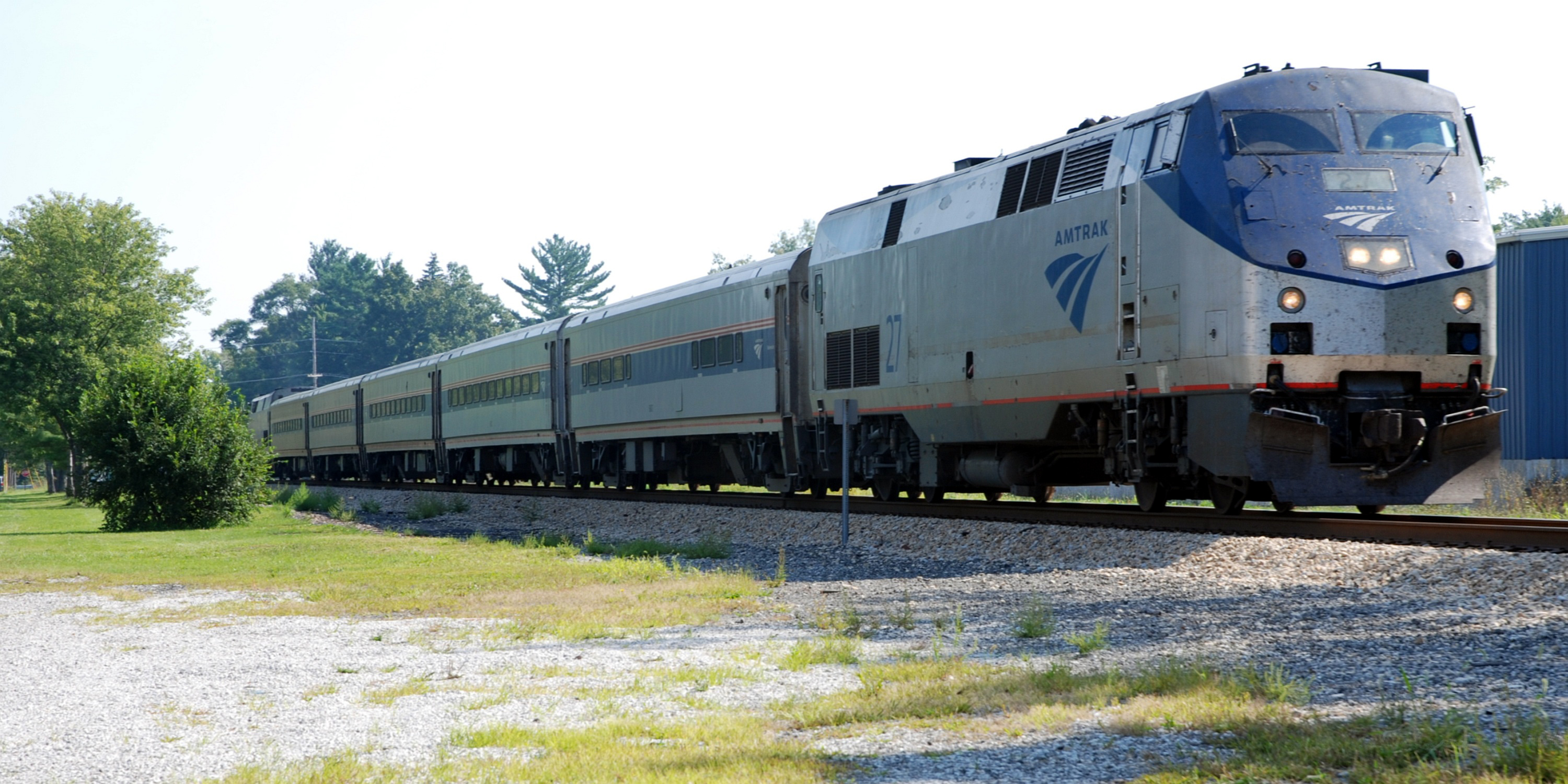
Horizon cars on the Wolverine in September 2009

As of May 2024, Horizon cars were primarily assigned to the Chicago-based Amtrak Midwest services, including:

- Borealis
- Hiawatha
- Illinois Service (Carl Sandburg, Illini, Illinois Zephyr, Lincoln Service, Saluki)
- Michigan Services (Blue Water, Wolverine)
- Missouri River Runner

Additionally, Horizon cars were also assigned to:

- Cascades
- Downeaster

== See also ==
- Shoreliner – commuter railcars operated by Metro-North also based on the Comet design.
