= E. M. Tucker =

American architect

Everett M. Tucker (1883 or 1884 – March 24, 1936) was an American architect of St. Louis, Missouri, who worked for the Missouri Pacific Railroad.

Tucker worked for the Illinois Central Railroad beginning in 1901. Tucker was a member of American Railway Engineering Association, and served in the Association's Committee XXIII Shops and Locomotive Terminals in 1920. At least six structures designed by Tucker are listed in the National Register of Historic Places. Three stations, in Little Rock and Texarkana, Arkansas, and Washington, Missouri, are still in use by Amtrak as passenger stations.

== Works ==
- Missouri Pacific depot, Prescott, Arkansas, 1912
- St. Louis, Iron Mountain & Southern Depot, Sikeston, Missouri, 1916, NRHP 0001549
- Missouri Pacific Freight Station, Independence, Kansas, 1916
- Missouri Pacific Roundhouse, Joplin, Missouri, c1917
- Missouri Pacific Depot, Charleston, Missouri, 1917, NRHP 72000722
- Missouri Pacific Passenger Station, Mineral Point, Missouri, 1918
- Missouri Pacific Depot, El Dorado, Kansas, 1918, NRHP 94000429
- Union Station, Little Rock, Arkansas, 1921, NRHP 77000270
- Missouri Pacific Station, Lake Village, Arkansas, 1922
- Missouri Pacific Station, Washington, Missouri, 1923
- Missouri Pacific Station, Harrisburg, Arkansas, c1923
- Missouri Pacific Railroad Hospital, Little Rock, Arkansas, 1925
- St. Louis, Iron Mountain and Southern Railway Station, Malvern, Arkansas, 1925
- Missouri Pacific Building, St. Louis, Missouri, 1928, NRHP 02001441, Mauran, Russell & Crowell with E. M. Tucker
- Union Station, Texarkana, Arkansas, 1930, NRHP 78000611

== Gallery ==
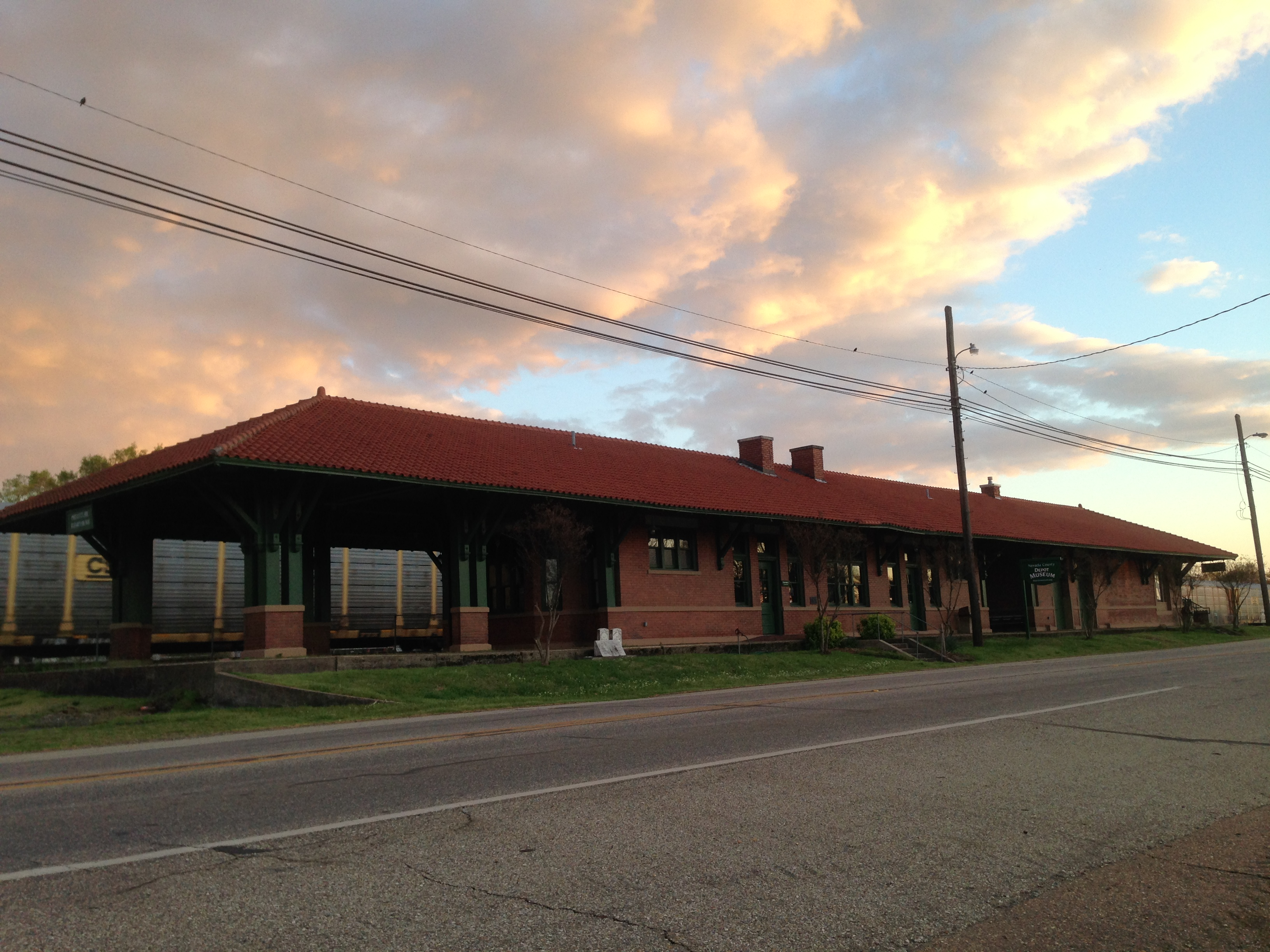
Missouri Pacific Depot, Prescott, Arkansas

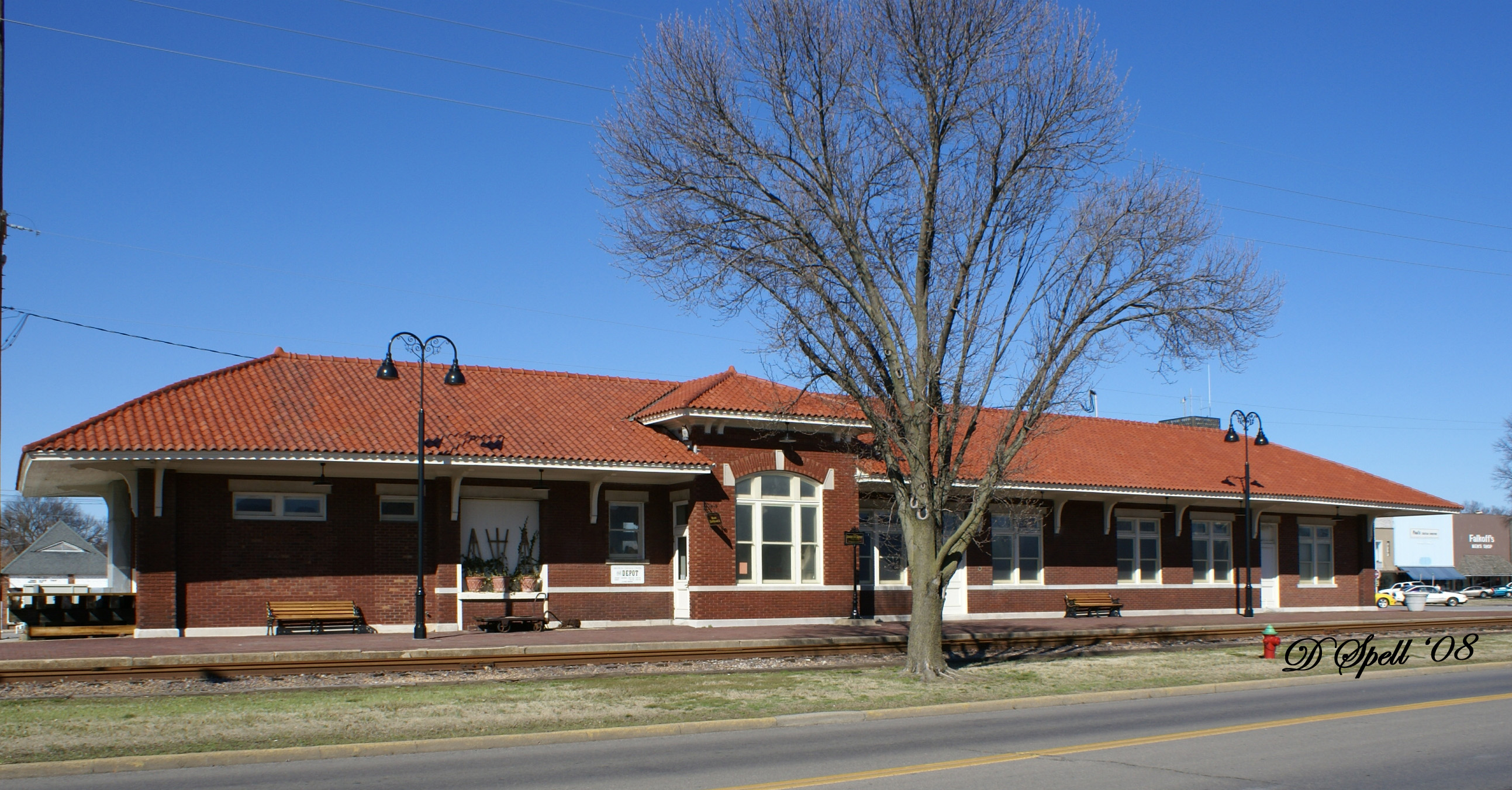
St. Louis, Iron Mountain & Southern Depot, Sikeston, Missouri

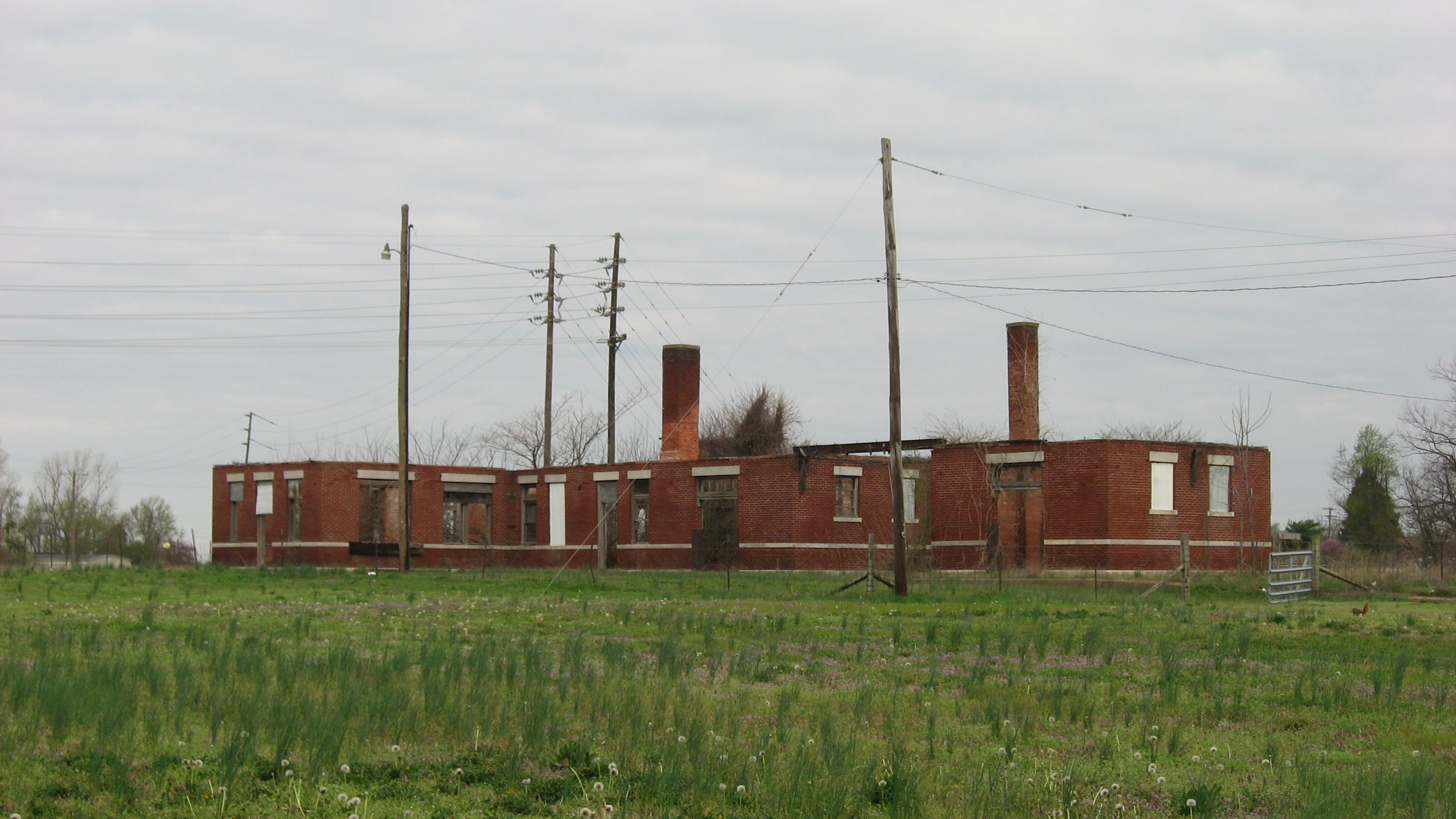
Missouri Pacific Depot, Charleston, Missouri

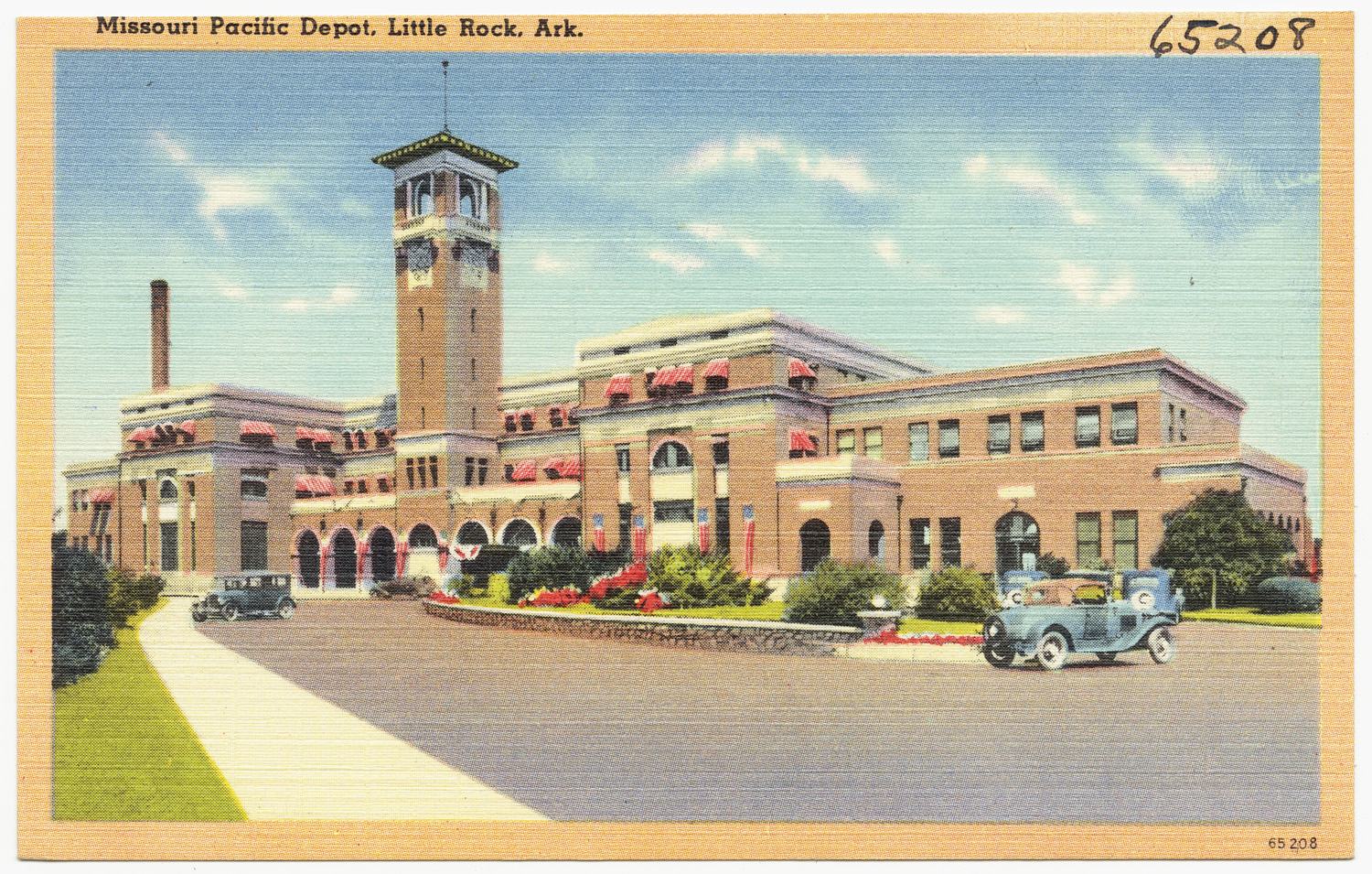
Union Station, Little Rock, Arkansas

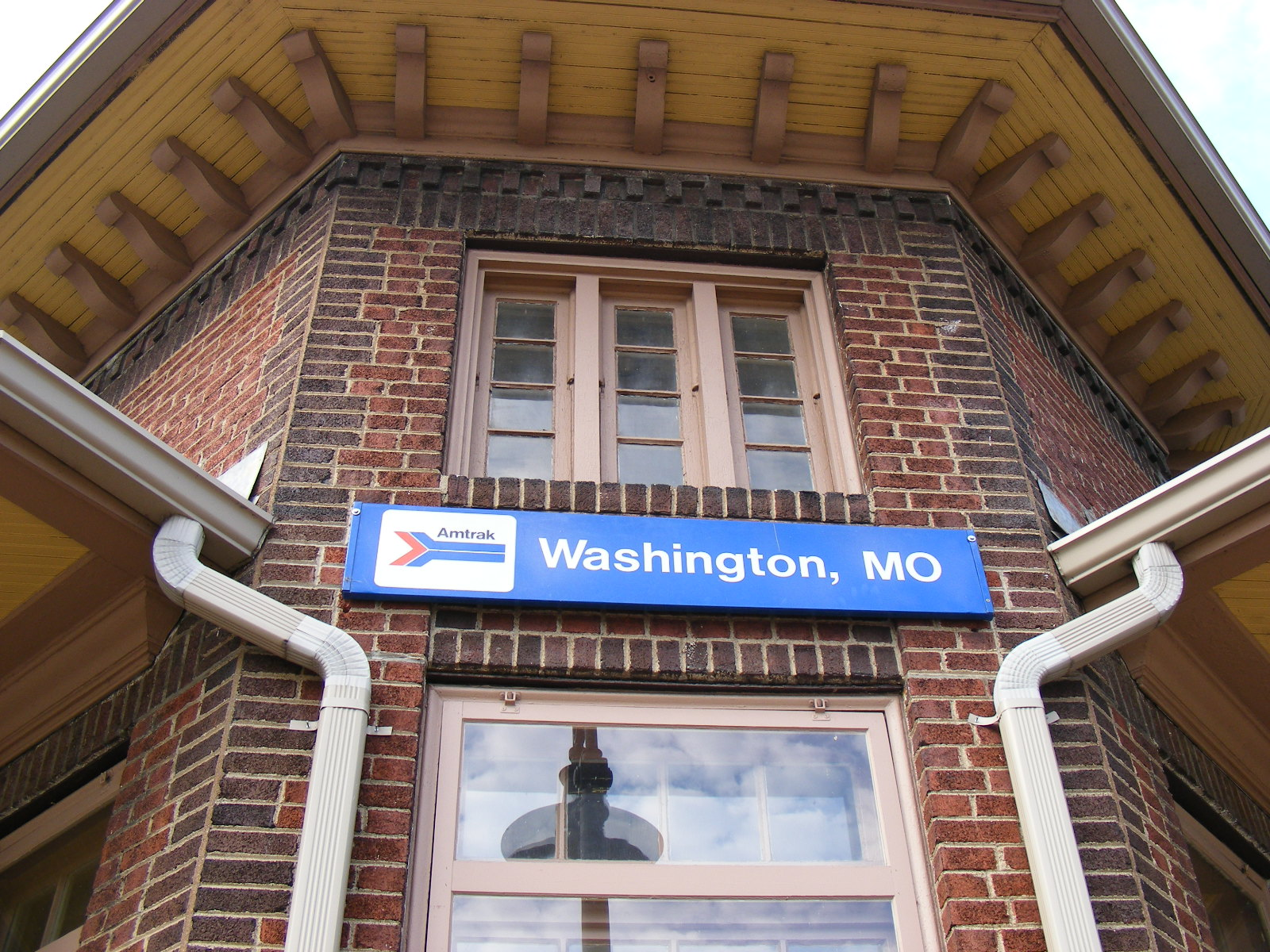
Missouri Pacific Station, Washington, Missouri

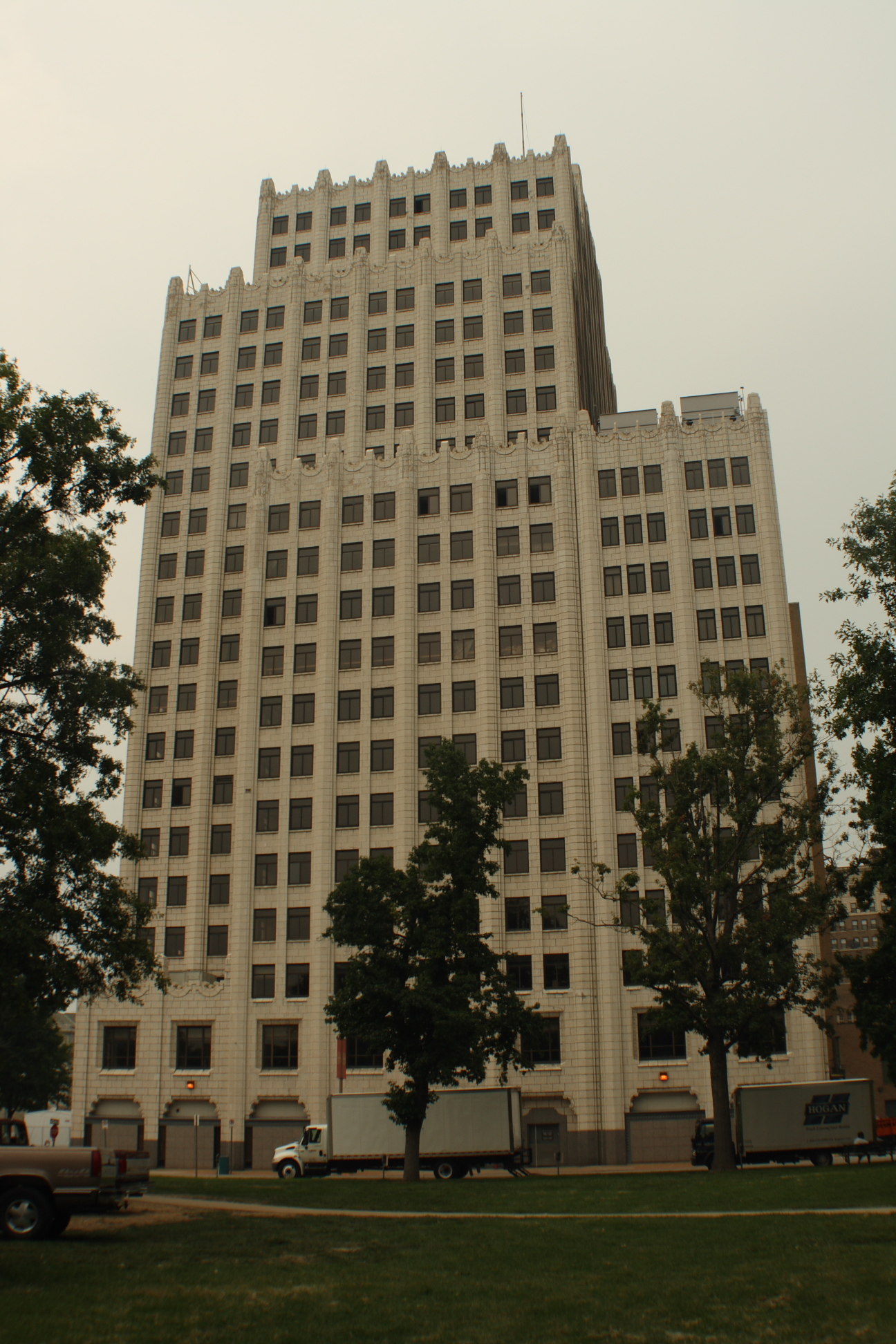
Missouri Pacific Building, St. Louis, Missouri

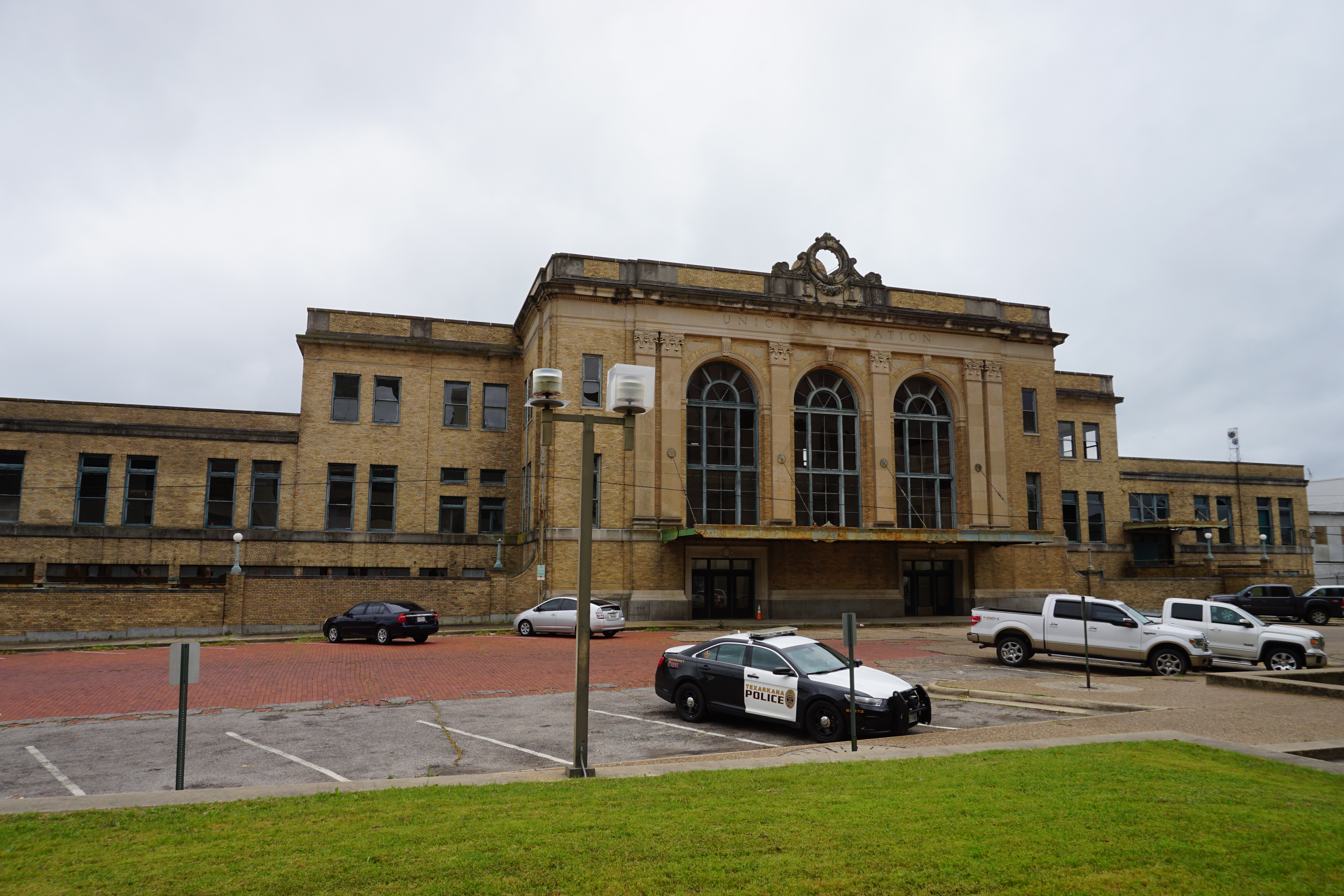
Union Station, Texarkana, Arkansas
