= Missouri River Runner =

Passenger train service in Missouri, U.S.

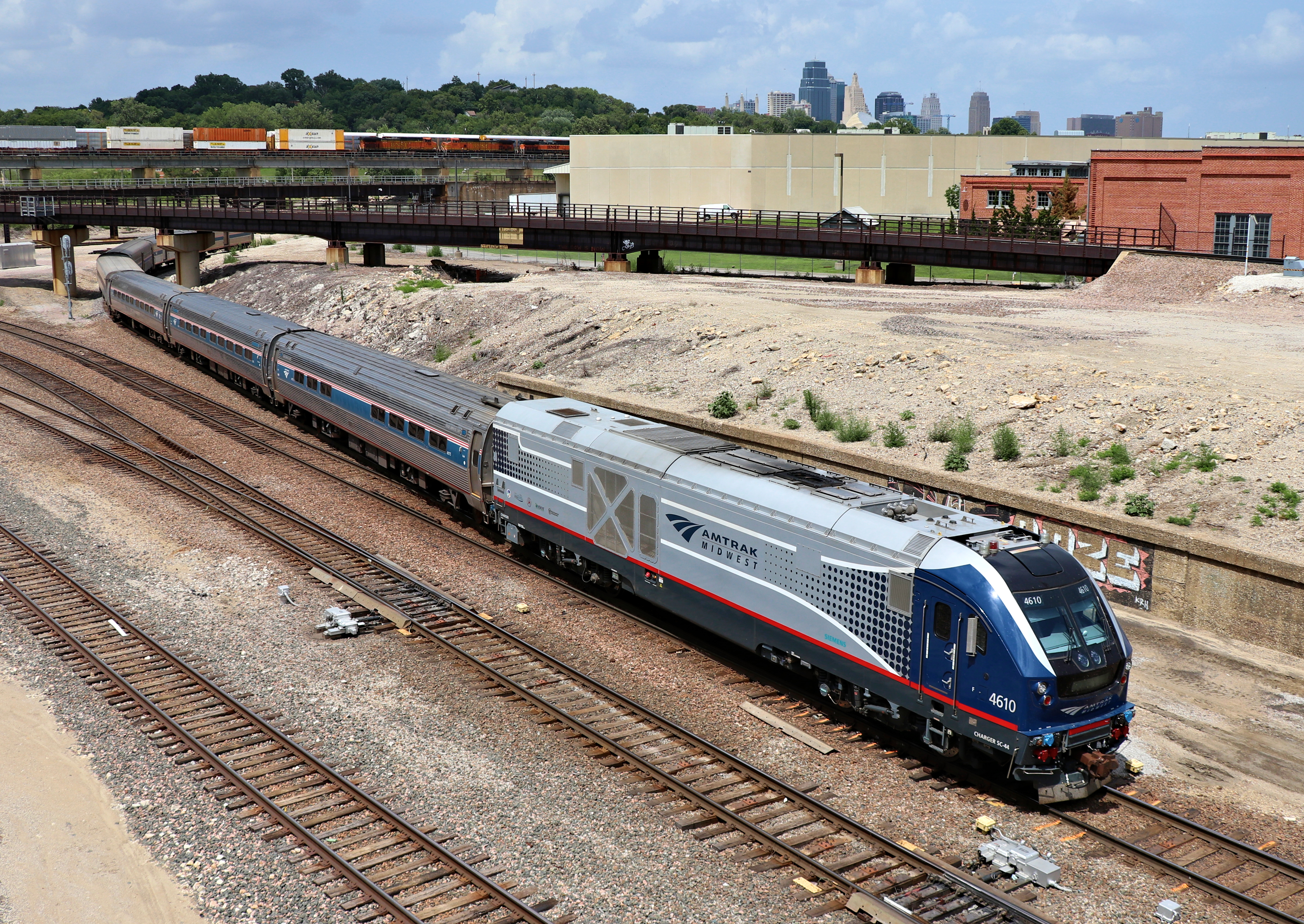
- Missouri River Runner in Kansas City, June 2018

Overview
- Service type: Inter-city rail
- Locale: Missouri
- Predecessor: Mules; Ann Rutledge
- First service: January 28, 2009
- Current operator: Amtrak
- Annual ridership: 196,989 (FY 25) ▲4.9% (Note: Amtrak's Fiscal Year (FY) runs from October 1 of the prior year to September 30 of the named year.)

Route
- Termini: Kansas City; St. Louis
- Stops: 8
- Distance travelled: 283 miles (455 km)
- Average journey time: 5 hours, 40 minutes
- Service frequency: 2 daily round trips
- Train number: 311, 316, 318, 319

On-board services
- Classes: Coach Class; Business Class
- Catering facilities: Café

Technical
- Rolling stock: Venture; Amfleet; Siemens Charger
- Track gauge: 4 ft 8 1/2 in (1,435 mm) standard gauge
- Operating speed: 50 mph (80 km/h) (avg.); 79 mph (127 km/h) (top)
- Track owner: UP

The Missouri River Runner is a 283-mile (455 km) passenger train service operated by Amtrak in Missouri between Gateway Transportation Center in St. Louis and Union Station in Kansas City. The eastern half of the route runs largely along the right bank of the Missouri River.

First introduced in 1980 as the Kansas City Mule and St. Louis Mule, the Missouri River Runner received its current name in 2009. As of 2023, there are two daily round trips between Kansas City and St. Louis, with one continuing north to Chicago Union Station as a Lincoln Service train. These services fall under the Amtrak Midwest brand.

== History ==
=== Prior services ===
The Missouri River Runner route was previously served by the Missouri Mules (known as the Kansas City Mule westbound and the St. Louis Mule eastbound) and the Ann Rutledge under the Missouri Service brand. The Missouri Service, in turn, ran along the former main line of the Missouri Pacific Railroad. Several of MoPac's St. Louis–Kansas City trains continued onward to Omaha and Denver. Missouri Pacific was acquired by the Union Pacific Railroad in 1983.

When Amtrak took over nationwide passenger service in 1971, the route became the western leg of the National Limited, which originated in New York. This was the first passenger train on the route to originate at a point east of the Mississippi River. It was the successor of the famed Spirit of St. Louis, which was extended to Kansas City after Amtrak's formation and renamed later in 1971.

When the National Limited was canceled in 1979, the only train serving the St. Louis–Kansas City corridor was the Chicago–Kansas City Ann Rutledge. Missouri officials pressed for the introduction of the Mules in order to maintain and improve service between St. Louis and Kansas City. Over the ensuing years of state subsidy, additional station stops were established at Washington, Hermann, Lee's Summit and Independence.

The Ann Rutledge had previously been part of both the Missouri Service and Illinois Service, but had its eastern terminus cut back to St. Louis in 2006. This gave the St. Louis–Kansas City route two daily round trips on a schedule similar to the last pre-Amtrak MoPac service. The Chicago–St. Louis State House connected once per day with the Ann Rutledge to continue through service from Chicago to Kansas City.

In 1984, Amtrak's Jefferson City depot and ticket office was moved from the former MoPac station to a renovated historic building east of the depot but closer to the Missouri State Capitol. It was hoped the relocated station would allow tourists and others easier access to the state government buildings. Jefferson City is not on an Interstate Highway; the nearest commercial airport is in Columbia. The revived station stop at Hermann was instituted in similar fashion to encourage use of Amtrak for access the city's popular German festivals.

=== Missouri River Runner ===
In 2008, Amtrak and the Missouri Department of Transportation (MoDOT) decided to merge the Mules and Ann Rutledge into a single route. The name of the new route was announced in January 2009 as part of the "Name The Train" contest held by MoDOT. The winning name was submitted by Keith Kohler of Glendale, Missouri; it reflects the fact that the route largely parallels the Missouri River. The other finalists were Missouri Rail Blazer, ShowMeMO, Truman Service and River Cities Corridor. The service is financed primarily through funds made available by MoDOT.

In November 2009, Amtrak and Union Pacific completed an $8.1-million 9,000-foot (2,700 m) passing loop near California, Missouri, designed to improve performance along the route. It was funded by the state of Missouri and the Federal Railroad Administration and has been credited with helping to improve Amtrak's on-time performance. Due to these improvements, on-time performance has increased from less than 70% to 95%.

During fiscal year 2015, the service carried a total of 178,915 passengers, a 5.5% decrease from FY 2014's total of 189,402 passengers. The trains had a total revenue of $5,108,200 during FY 2015, a decrease of 4.4% from FY 2014's total of $5,341,229.

As of October 1, 2013, Amtrak cannot use its federal operating grant to share the cost of the Missouri River Runner route, because the Passenger Rail Investment and Improvement Act of 2008 does not allow cost-sharing on any route shorter than 750 miles (1,210 km). By 2020, the State of Missouri owed Amtrak $6.5 million in unpaid bills in addition to that year's contract amount for continued service.

==== COVID-19 pandemic ====
In March 2020, service was reduced to one round trip per day due to the COVID-19 pandemic. Amtrak and MoDOT restored the route's second daily round trip on July 19, 2021. However, this second round trip was once again suspended on January 3, 2022, after the Missouri General Assembly cut the trip from the state budget. Missouri restored full funding in July 2022 amid increased demand for public transit due to high gas prices. The second round trip returned on July 18, but was suspended again on October 24, 2022, due to a shortage of available train equipment. The second round trip was officially added back again on December 16, 2022.

On May 23, 2022, Amtrak began through-routing one round trip of the Missouri River Runner and Lincoln Service, creating a Kansas City–Chicago round trip. A third daily round trip was planned to operate from April to June 2026 during the 2026 FIFA World Cup. This did not occur, though an extra coach was added to the existing trips from approximately June 15 to July 12, 2026.

=== Proposed expansion ===
MoDOT has proposed extending the Missouri River Runner west from Kansas City to St. Joseph, Missouri. In December 2023, the Federal Railroad Administration accepted an application by MoDOT to enter the St. Joseph–Kansas City route into its Corridor Identification and Development Program. The program grants $500,000 toward service planning and prioritizes the extension for future federal funding.

== Rolling stock ==
The Missouri River Runner consists of the following:

- One Siemens Charger locomotive
- One Amfleet I business/cafe car
- Three to five Amfleet I and/or Venture coaches

== Route ==
One daily Runner round trip is through-routed with a trip of the Chicago–St. Louis Lincoln Service.

Missouri River Runner route map

=== Stations ===
Amtrak Missouri River Runner stations
State/Province	City	Station
Missouri	Kansas City	Kansas City
Missouri	Independence	Independence
Missouri	Lee's Summit	Lee's Summit
Missouri	Warrensburg	Warrensburg
Missouri	Sedalia	Sedalia
Missouri	Jefferson City	Jefferson City
Missouri	Hermann	Hermann
Missouri	Washington	Washington
Missouri	Kirkwood	Kirkwood
Missouri	St. Louis	St. Louis Gateway
