= Gateway Transportation Center =

Rail and bus terminal in St. Louis, Missouri

Gateway Transportation Center St. Louis, MO
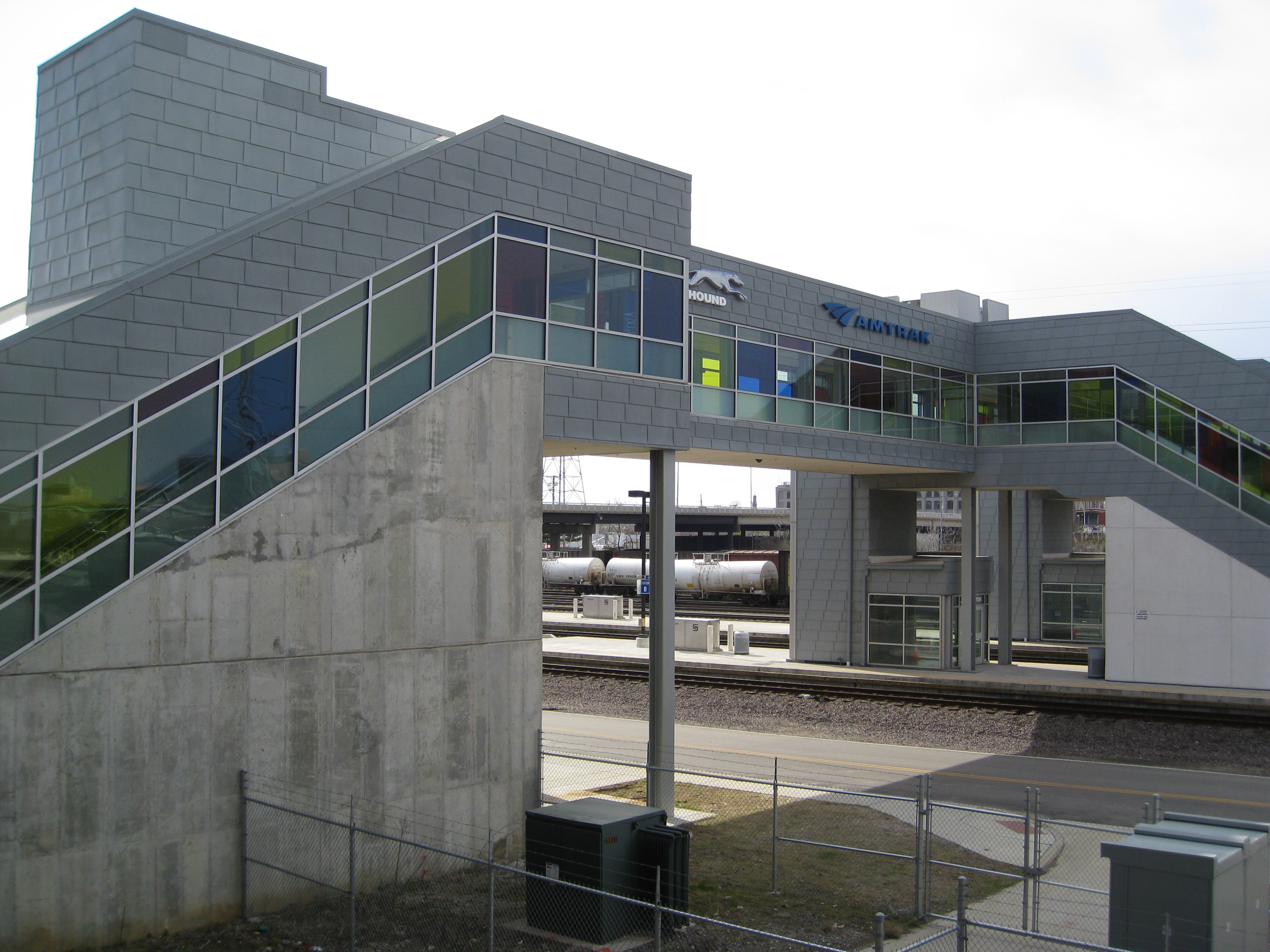
- A view of the rail platform at St. Louis's Gateway Station

General information
- Location: 430 South 15th Street; St. Louis, Missouri
- Coordinates: 38°37′27″N 90°12′13″W
- Owner: City of St. Louis
- Platforms: 2 island platforms
- Tracks: 4
- Train operators: Amtrak
- Bus stands: 10
- Bus operators: Amtrak Thruway; Burlington Trailways; Greyhound Lines; Megabus
- Connections: At Civic Center station: MetroLink: Red Blue; MetroBus Missouri: 4, 10, 11, 19, 30, 31, 32, 40, 41, 73, 74, 94, 97, 174X; Madison County Transit: 1X, 5, 14X, 16X

Construction
- Parking: 42 spaces
- Cycle facilities: Racks
- Accessible: Yes

Other information
- Station code: Amtrak: STL
- IATA code: ZSV

History
- Opened: November 12, 2008

Passengers
- FY 2025: 395,716 (Amtrak)

Services
Preceding station	Amtrak	Following station
Terminus	Lincoln Service	Alton toward Chicago
Arcadia Valley toward Los Angeles or San Antonio	Texas Eagle	Alton toward Chicago
Kirkwood toward Kansas City	Missouri River Runner	Terminus
Location

The Gateway Multimodal Transportation Center, also known as Gateway Station, is a rail and bus terminal station in the Downtown West neighborhood of St. Louis, Missouri. Opened in 2008 and operating 24 hours a day, it serves Amtrak trains and Greyhound and Burlington Trailways interstate buses. Missouri's largest rail transportation station, it is located one block east of St. Louis Union Station.

Gateway Station cost $31.4 million (Note: equivalent to $47 million in 2025) to build, and after more than a year of delays it fully opened on November 19, 2008. The station's unique design has won several awards, including 2009 St. Louis Construction News and Real Estate's Regional Excellence Award, 2008 Best New Building by the Riverfront Times, and the 2009 Award of Merit - Illuminating Engineering Society Illumination Awards.

== Services ==
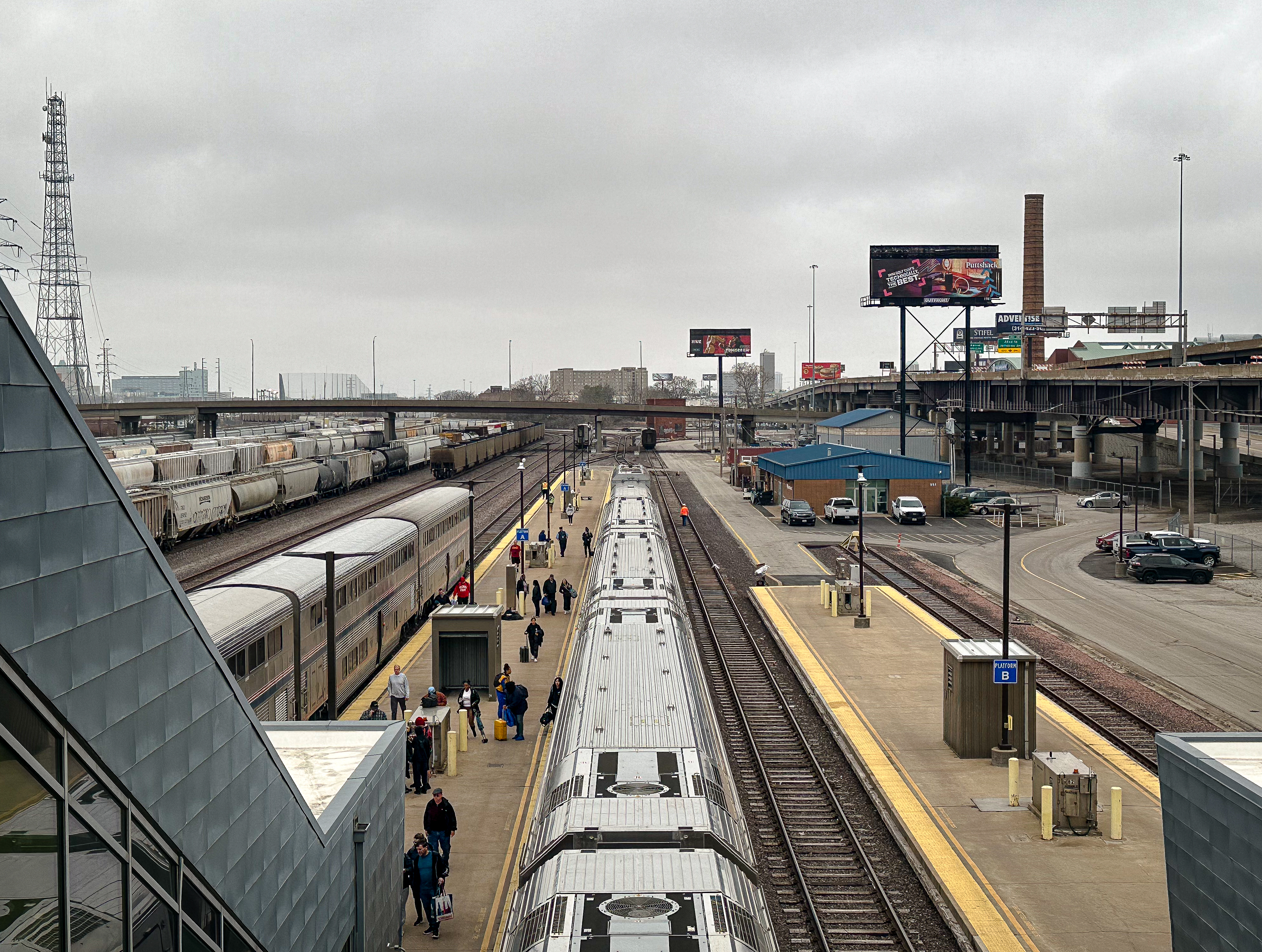
A Lincoln Service train shortly after arriving in St. Louis in 2024

Gateway Station serves as a hub for Amtrak and intercity bus service with connections to local buses and trains available at the neighboring Civic Center Transit Center.

=== Amtrak ===
Of the 13 Missouri stations served by Amtrak, St. Louis was the busiest in FY2017, seeing an average of over 1,000 passengers daily. The station is served by Amtrak's Missouri River Runner, Lincoln Service, and the Texas Eagle, with a total of 14 trains daily. All but the Texas Eagle originate or terminate at the station.

=== Intercity Bus ===
Intercity bus services are provided by Amtrak Thruway, Greyhound Lines, Burlington Trailways and Megabus.

=== MetroLink and MetroBus ===
Gateway Station is located next to the Civic Center Transit Center which serves MetroLink's Red and Blue lines and multiple MetroBus lines. It takes about 30 minutes to travel to St. Louis Lambert International Airport via the Red Line.

== Previous Amtrak facilities in St. Louis ==
Created in 1971, Amtrak originally operated from St. Louis Union Station. However, when it became apparent that there were no longer enough trains serving St. Louis to justify the use of such a large facility, Union Station was abandoned in November 1978. Amtrak then moved to a modular structure two blocks east, at 550 S. 16th St; the new station was originally approved on a site west of Union Station in 1976, with a budget of $6.4 million. Opened on November 3, 1978 and originally intended for temporary use, this station—soon dubbed "Amshack"—remained in service for 26 years, even after Union Station reopened and long past the end of its useful life. On December 20, 2004, Amtrak moved across the street to 551 South 16th Street, a 4,000-square-foot (370 m^{2}) masonry and steel "interim" structure built at an estimated cost of $600,000. (Note: equivalent to $1,022,727 in 2025) The building now houses Amtrak operating and mechanical crews.

== See also ==
- List of Amtrak stations
