= List of named passenger trains of the United States (A–B) =

This article contains a list of named passenger trains in the United States, with names beginning A through B.

== A ==
Train name	Railroad	Train endpoints in a typical [year]	Operated
Abraham Lincoln	Alton Railroad (1935–1947); Gulf, Mobile & Ohio (1947–1971); Amtrak (1971–1978)	Chicago-St. Louis [1948]	1935–1978
Acadian	Southern Pacific	Houston–New Orleans [1941]	1936–1956
Acela Express (renamed Acela in 2019)	Amtrak	Boston–Washington, D.C. [2012]	2000–present
Acela (train type, not name)	Amtrak	Boston–Washington, D.C. [2012]	2000–present
Adirondack	Amtrak	New York City–Montreal [1979]	1974–present
Adirondack and Montreal Express	New York Central	New York City–Montreal [1914]	1902–1922
Admiral	Pennsylvania	New York City–Chicago–Washington, DC [1952]	1939–1964
Advance Commodore Vanderbilt	New York Central	New York City–Chicago [1948]	1929–1955
Advance Denver Zephyr	Chicago, Burlington & Quincy	Chicago–Denver [1936]	1936
Advance Empire State Express	New York Central	New York City–Buffalo, New York [1952]	1942–1956
Advance Florida Special	Pennsylvania, Richmond, Fredericksburg & Potomac, Atlantic Coast Line, Florida East Coast	New York City–Miami [1940]	1938–1942
Advance Flyer	Chicago, Burlington & Quincy	Chicago–Lincoln, Nebraska [1942]	1941–1946
Advance Forest City	New York Central	Chicago–New York [1942]	1942–1945
Advance Gilt Edge	New Haven	New York City–Boston [1943]	1937–1951
Advance Knickerbocker	New York Central	St. Louis–Boston [1948]	1945–1956
Advance Merchants Limited	New Haven	New York–Boston [1954]	1952–1960
Advance Midnight Special	Gulf, Mobile & Ohio	Chicago–St. Louis [1948]	1947–1949
Advance Silver Meteor	Pennsylvania, Richmond, Fredericksburg & Potomac, Seaboard Air Line	New York City–Miami [1945]	1942–1947
Advance Twentieth Century Limited	New York Central	Chicago–New York [1930]	1929–1931
Advance Water Level Limited	New York Central	Chicago–New York [1944]	1943–1945
Advance Wolverine	New York Central	Chicago–New York–Boston [1947]	1947–1948
Adventureland	Chicago, Burlington & Quincy	Kansas City, Missouri–Billings, Montana [1952]	1937–1952
Afternoon Congressional	Pennsylvania; Penn Central (1968–1970)	New York–Washington, D.C.[1958]	1952–1970
Afternoon Executive	Amtrak	New York–Washington, D.C.[1971]	1971–1972
Afternoon Express	New York, New Haven and Hartford Railroad	New York–Boston [1900]	1891–1913
Afternoon Flyer	Grand Rapids and Indiana Railroad	Chicago–Grand Rapids, Michigan [1912]	1904–1918
Afternoon Hiawatha	Milwaukee Road	Chicago–St. Paul, Minnesota [1941]	1939–1970
Afternoon Keystone	Pennsylvania; Penn Central (1968–1969)	New York–Washington, D.C. [1965]	1961–1969
Afternoon Puget Sounder	Great Northern	Seattle–Vancouver [1948]	1946–1950
Afternoon Steeler	Pennsylvania	Pittsburgh–Cleveland [1952]	1950–1958
Afternoon Twin Cities Zephyr	Chicago, Burlington & Quincy	Chicago–St. Paul, Minnesota [1940]	1936–1970
Aiken-Augusta Special	Pennsylvania; Southern	New York City–Charlotte, North Carolina–Columbia, South Carolina–Augusta, Georgia [1935]	1928–1953
Air Line Limited	New York, New Haven and Hartford Railroad	New York–Boston [1900]	1894–1901
Air Line Special	New York, New Haven and Hartford Railroad	New York–Fitchburg, Massachusetts [1905]	1904–1907
Airway Limited	Pennsylvania; Transcontinental Air Transport	New York City–Los Angeles [1930]	1929–1932
Akron and Cleveland Express	Pennsylvania	Chicago–Akron, Ohio [1914]	1912–1918
Akronite	Pennsylvania	New York City–Akron, Ohio [1941]	1937–1957
Ak-Sar-Ben	Chicago, Burlington & Quincy	Chicago–Lincoln, Nebraska [1950]	1930–1953; 1969–1970
Ak-Sar-Ben Zephyr	Chicago, Burlington & Quincy	Chicago–Lincoln, Nebraska [1958]	1940–1947; 1953–1969
Alamo	Southern Pacific	New Orleans–San Antonio [1940]	1936–1952
Alamo Special	Missouri-Kansas-Texas	Houston–San Antonio [1930]	1906–1910; 1928–1933
Alaskan	Northern Pacific, Chicago, Burlington and Quincy Railroad, Spokane, Portland & Seattle	Chicago–Tacoma, Washington–Portland, Oregon [1949]	1931–1952
Albany and Troy Express	New York Central	New York City–Albany, New York–Troy, New York [1912]	1900–1938
Albany Express	New York Central	New York, New York-Albany, New York [1925]	1908–1917; 1923–1943
Albany Mail	New York Central	New York City–Utica, New York [1947]	1947–1948
Albany Morning Express	Boston and Albany Railroad	Boston–Albany, New York [1920]	1913–1932
Albany Night Express	Boston and Albany Railroad, New York Central Railroad	Boston–Chicago [1921]	1913–1926
Alburgh Express	Rutland Railroad	Ogdensburg, New York–Rutland (city), Vermont [1918]	1914–1918
Alexandria	Pennsylvania	New York–Washington, D.C. [1945]	1941–1958
Alexandrian	Great Northern	St. Paul, Minnesota–Fargo, North Dakota [1941]	1932–1950
All-Florida Special	Pennsylvania, Richmond, Fredericksburg & Potomac, Seaboard Air Line	Boston–St. Petersburg, Florida–West Palm Beach, Florida [1925]	1924–1927
Allegheny	Pennsylvania	St. Louis–Pittsburgh [1951]	1948–1959
Alouette	Boston & Maine, Canadian Pacific Railway	Boston–Montreal [1934]	1926–1965
Alton Limited	Alton Railroad (pre–1947), Gulf, Mobile & Ohio (1947–end)	Chicago–St. Louis [1934]	1900–1924; 1928–1958
Ambassador	Baltimore & Ohio	Detroit–Baltimore [1952]	1931–1964
Ambassador	New Haven, Boston & Maine, Central Vermont, and Canadian National	Boston–Montreal [1937]	1927–1966
American	Pennsylvania	New York City–St. Louis [1930]	1925–1956
American	Great Northern	Seattle–Vancouver [1927]	1919–1946
American Express	Cleveland, Cincinnati, Chicago and St. Louis Railway	Cleveland–St. Louis [1912]	1911–1918
American Royal	Chicago, Burlington & Quincy	Chicago–Kansas City, Missouri [1945]	1932–1952; 1969–1971
American Royal Zephyr	Chicago, Burlington & Quincy	Chicago–Kansas City, Missouri [1960]	1953–1968
Angel	Santa Fe	San Francisco–Los Angeles–San Diego [1915]	1911–1917
Angelo	Santa Fe	Fort Worth, Texas–San Angelo, Texas [1952]	1933–1966
Ann Rutledge	Alton Railroad (1937–1947), Gulf, Mobile & Ohio (1947–1958)	Chicago–St. Louis [1940]	1937–1958
Ann Rutledge	Amtrak	Chicago–Kansas City, Missouri [1981]	1976–2009; 1976–2008
Antelope	Santa Fe	Kansas City, Missouri–Fort Worth, Texas [1946] Kansas City, Missouri–Oklahoma City [1952]	1927–1948; 1948–1954
Anthracite Express	Pennsylvania	Philadelphia–Wilkes-Barre, Pennsylvania [1939]	1933–1941
Apache	Rock Island and Southern Pacific	Chicago–Los Angeles [1930]	1927–1938
Argonaut	Southern Pacific	Los Angeles–New Orleans [1952]	1926–1932; 1936–1958
Aristocrat	Chicago, Burlington & Quincy	Denver–Chicago [1933]	1930–1941
Arizona Limited	Rock Island and Southern Pacific	Chicago, Illinois-Phoenix, Arizona	1940–1942
Arkansas and Texas Mail	St. Louis–San Francisco Railway	St. Louis–Cleburne, Texas [1905]	1898–1908
Arlington	Pennsylvania	New York City–Washington, D.C. [1941]	1933–1962
Aroostook Flyer	Bangor & Aroostook	Bangor, Maine–Van Buren, Maine [1950]	1937–1957
Arrow	Milwaukee Road	Chicago–Sioux Falls, South Dakota [1952]	1926–1967
Arrowhead	Amtrak	Minneapolis–Duluth, Minnesota [1976]	1976–1977
Arrowhead Limited	Chicago & North Western	Chicago–Duluth, Minnesota [1952]	1927–1955
Arundel	Maine Central, Boston and Maine	Boston–Bangor, Maine [1952]	1952–1953
Asa Packer	Lehigh Valley	New York City–Coxton, Pennsylvania [1941]	1939–1958
Asheville Special	Pennsylvania, then Penn Central (1968–1970); Southern	New York City–Asheville, North Carolina [1948]	1930–1970
Ashland and Ishpeming Mail	Chicago & North Western	Chicago–Green Bay, Wisconsin [1924]	1914–1918; 1921–1928
Ashland Limited	Chicago & North Western	Chicago–Ashland, Wisconsin [1948]	1894–1901; 1914–1957
Ashland Mail	Chicago & North Western	Chicago–Ashland, Wisconsin [1942]	1929–1930; 1937–1951
Atlanta Limited	Illinois Central	Shreveport, Louisiana–Meridian, Mississippi [1937]	1934–1942; 1946–1947
Atlanta Owl	Seaboard Air Line Railroad	Atlanta-Birmingham, Alabama [1936]	1925–1926; 1934–1938
Atlanta–Birmingham Special	Pennsylvania; Southern	New York, New York–Birmingham, Alabama [1913]	1911–1934
Atlanta–Jacksonville Express	Southern	Atlanta–Jacksonville, Florida [1921]	1920–1924
Atlanta–Memphis Express	Southern	Atlanta–Memphis, Tennessee [1923]	1921–1924; 1933–1935
Atlantic City Express	Central Railroad of New Jersey	New York City–Atlantic City, New Jersey [1925]	1907–1910; 1923–1928
Atlantic City Express	Pennsylvania	Washington, D.C.–Atlantic City, New Jersey [1912]	1910–1942
Atlantic City Express	Amtrak	Philadelphia International Airport, Pennsylvania–Atlantic City, New Jersey [1990]	1989–1994
Atlantic City Limited	Pennsylvania	New York City–Atlantic City, New Jersey [1925]	1919–1931
Atlantic City Special	Central Railroad of New Jersey	New York, New York–Atlantic City, New Jersey [1924]	1902–1910; 1923–1926
Atlantic Coast Limited	Chicago, Burlington & Quincy	Chicago–Denver [1915]	1910–1916; 1929–1930
Atlantic Coast Line Express	Pennsylvania, Richmond, Fredericksburg and Potomac Railroad, Atlantic Coast Line Railroad	New York, New York–Tampa, Florida [1912]	1893–1935
Atlantic Express	Erie	New York City–Chicago [1950]	1874–1878; 1885–1887; 1892–1915; 1922–1964
Atlantic Express	Grand Trunk Western	Chicago–Montreal [1913]	1879–1917
Atlantic Express	Michigan Central, New York Central Railroad	New York City–Chicago [1928]	1882–1930
Atlantic Express	Pennsylvania	Pittsburgh–Harrisburg, Pennsylvania [1916]	1875–1928
Atlantic Express	Canadian National Railway	Chicago–Toronto [1928]	1926–1930
Atlantic Express	Northern Pacific Railway, Spokane, Portland and Seattle Railway	Saint Paul, Minnesota–Seattle–Portland, Oregon [1924]	1883–1888; 1910–1930
Atlantic Express	Chicago & North Western	Chicago–Minneapolis [1924]	1900–1926
Atlantic Express	Union Pacific Railroad	Portland, Oregon–Kansas City, Missouri [1924]	1903–1928
Atlantic Flyer	Louisville and Nashville Railroad	Cincinnati–Birmingham, Alabama [1933]	1929–1936
Atlantic Highlands Express	Central Railroad of New Jersey	New York City–Atlantic Highlands, New Jersey	?
Atlantic Limited	Minneapolis, St. Paul and Sault Ste. Marie	Minneapolis–Sault Ste. Marie, Michigan–Montreal [1908]	1902–1909
Atlantic Limited	Canadian Pacific (1955–1978); Via (1978–1979) via Maine Central Railroad Mattawamkeag to Vanceboro	Saint John, New Brunswick–Montreal [1963]	1956–1970; 1978–1981
Augusta Special	Pennsylvania; Southern	New York, New York–Charlotte, North Carolina–Columbia, South Carolina–Augusta, Georgia [1958]	1915–1928; 1953–1966
Augusta-Aiken Special	Pennsylvania; Southern	New York, New York–Charlotte, North Carolina–Columbia, South Carolina–Augusta, Georgia [1932]	1931–1934
Aurora Winter Train	Alaska Railroad	Anchorage, Alaska-Fairbanks, Alaska [1978]	1947–present
Auto Train	Auto-Train Corporation (1971–1981); Amtrak (1983–present)	Lorton, Virginia–Sanford, Florida (1971–1981; 1983–present); Louisville, Kentucky-Sanford, Florida (1974–1977)	see on left
Azalean	Louisville & Nashville	Cincinnati–New Orleans [1952]	1937–1953
Aztec Eagle (Aguila Azteca)	Nacionales de Mexico; Missouri Pacific	Mexico City–Nuevo Laredo–San Antonio [1955]	1950–1971

== B ==
Train name	Railroad	Train endpoints in a typical [year]	Operated
Badger	Amtrak	Chicago–Milwaukee [1985]	1985–1989
Badger Express	Great Northern	St. Paul, Minnesota–Duluth, Minnesota [1943]; 1955-1971 just called 'Badger'	1925–1971
Badger Limited	Chicago North Shore and Milwaukee Railroad	Chicago–Milwaukee [1930]	1929–1933
Badger State Express	Chicago & North Western	Chicago–Minneapolis [1919]	1892–1936
Baltimore Day Express	Pennsylvania	Buffalo, New York-Washington, D.C. [1962]	1958-1968
Baltimore-Washington Night Express	Baltimore & Ohio, Central Railroad of New Jersey, Reading Company	Jersey City, New Jersey–Washington, D.C. [1941]	1938–1946
Bankers	New Haven; Penn Central (1969–1971)	New York City–Springfield, Massachusetts [1945]	1939–1971
Bankers	Amtrak	Washington, D.C.–Springfield, Massachusetts [1980]	1976–1998
Banner Blue	Wabash	Chicago–St. Louis [1938]	1894–1896; 1905–1967
Bar Harbor Express	Maine Central; Boston and Maine; New Haven	Washington, D.C.–Ellsworth, Maine [1950]	1902–1960
Barnacle Bill Special	Pennsylvania-Reading Seashore Lines	Philadelphia–Atlantic City, New Jersey [1939]	1938–1941
Bat	Chicago, Milwaukee, St. Paul and Pacific Railroad	Chicago–Minneapolis [1929]	1929–1930
Bay Shore Special	Central Railroad of New Jersey	Washington, D.C.–Ellingsworth, Pennsylvania [1948]	1940–1949
Bay State	New Haven; Penn Central (1969–1971); Amtrak (from 1971)	New York City–Boston [1985]	1894–1917; 1925–1974; 1982–1994; 1997–1998
Bayonne Flyer	New Jersey Transit (Hudson–Bergen Light Rail)	Hoboken, New Jersey–Bayonne, New Jersey	2011–present
Beach Comber	Boston & Maine	Boston–Portland, Maine [1950]	1950–1952
Beach Patrol	Pennsylvania-Reading Seashore Lines	Philadelphia–Atlantic City, New Jersey [1939]	1938–1941
Beach Special	Boston & Maine	Boston–Portland, Maine [1952]	1950–1952
Beachcomber	Long Island Rail Road	New York City–Montauk, New York [1964]	1963–1966
Beacon Hill	Amtrak	Boston–New Haven, Connecticut [1979]	1978–1981
Bear Mountain	Amtrak	New York City–Albany, New York [1985]	1977; 1981–1995
Beaver	Southern Pacific	San Francisco–Portland, Oregon [1942]	1940–1949
Beaver	New York Central	New York City–Cleveland–Toronto [1921]	1913–1926
Benjamin Franklin	Amtrak	Boston–Philadelphia [1982]	1977–1994
Berkshire	Boston & Albany, New York Central	Boston–Albany, New York [1948]	1902–1931; 1952–1959
Berkshire	Boston & Maine	Boston–Troy, New York [1940]	c. 1932-1936 (Berkshire Flyer); c. 1937–1940
Berkshire	New Haven	New York City–Pittsfield, Massachusetts [1954]	c. 1931–1941 (Berkshire Express); c. 1946–1968
Berkshire Hills Express	New York Central	New York City–Chatham, New York--North Adams, Massachusetts [1924]	1919–1934
Betsy Ross	Amtrak	New York City–Washington, D.C. [1980]	1976–1981
Bicentennial	Amtrak	Boston–Philadelphia [1976]	1976–1977
Big Apple	Amtrak	New York City–Harrisburg, Pennsylvania [1983]	1980–1992; 1997–1998
Birmingham and Atlanta Owl	Seaboard Air Line Railroad	Birmingham, Alabama–Atlanta [1930]	1927–1933
Birmingham Owl	Seaboard Air Line Railroad	Birmingham, Alabama–Atlanta [1935]	1925–1926; 1934–1938
Birmingham Special	Pennsylvania, then Penn Central (1969–1971); Norfolk & Western and Southern	New York City–Birmingham, Alabama, with a Chattanooga, Tennessee–Memphis, Tennessee segment [1926]	1909-1971
Biscayne	Florida East Coast Railway	Jacksonville, Florida–Miami [1930]	1927–1931
Black Diamond	Lehigh Valley; Reading	Philadelphia–New York City–Buffalo, New York [1952]	1896–1959
Black Gold	Frisco	Tulsa, Oklahoma–Fort Worth, Texas [1952]	1938–1959
Black Hawk	Chicago, Burlington & Quincy (–1970); Burlington Northern (6 weeks in 1970)	Chicago–Minneapolis [1945]	1927–1970
Black Hawk	Amtrak	Chicago–Dubuque, Iowa [1976]	1974–1981
Black Hills and Minnesota Express	Chicago & North Western	Chicago–Rapid City, South Dakota [1915]	1914–1918
Blue Arrow	Nickel Plate	Cleveland–St. Louis [1958]	1956–1959
Blue Bird	Chicago Great Western	Minneapolis–Rochester, Minnesota [1930]	1929–1931
Blue Bird	Wabash	Chicago–St. Louis [1943]	1938–1968
Blue Comet	Central Railroad of New Jersey	Jersey City, New Jersey–Atlantic City, New Jersey [1934]	1929–1941
Blue Dart	Nickel Plate	St. Louis–Cleveland [1958]	1956–1959
Blue Grass Special	Pennsylvania	Chicago–Louisville, Kentucky [1955]	1952–1957
Blue Ridge	Amtrak, Marc after 1986	Washington, D.C.–Martinsburg, West Virginia [1977]	1973–1988
Blue Ridge Limited	Baltimore & Ohio	Chicago–Washington, D.C. [1945]	1934–1949
Blue Water	Amtrak	Chicago–Port Huron, Michigan [2008]	1975–1982 as the Blue Water Limited; 2004–present
Bluebonnet	Frisco and Missouri–Kansas–Texas	St. Louis–Fort Worth, Texas [1952]	1928–1958
Bluegrass	Monon Railroad	Chicago–Louisville, Kentucky [1949]	1948–1952
Boardwalk Flyer	Pennsylvania-Reading Seashore Lines	Philadelphia–Atlantic City, New Jersey [1940]	1934–1935; 1939–1941
Bon-Air Special	Georgia & Florida	Augusta, Georgia–Jacksonville, Florida [1925]	1924–1930
Booth Tarkington	New York Central	Chicago–Cincinnati [1958]	1958
Border Limited	Southern Pacific	Houston–Corpus Christi, Texas [1952]	1929–1930; 1934–1952
Borealis	Amtrak	Chicago–Saint Paul [2024]	2024–present
Boston Afternoon Express	Boston & Albany	Boston–Albany, New York [1925]	1913–1927
Boston and Buffalo Special	New York Central	Boston–Chicago [1924]	1906–1928
Boston and Chicago Special	New York Central	Boston–Chicago [1912]	1892–1914
Boston and New York Express	New York Central	Boston–Chicago (with sleeping cars to many other points) [1912]	1905–1914
Boston Day Express	Boston & Albany, New Haven	New York City–Boston [1930]	1924–1931
Boston Evening Express	Boston & Albany	Boston-Albany, New York [1925]	1925-1928
Boston Express	New York Central	Buffalo, New York–Boston [1930]	1888–1948
Boston Express	Duluth, South Shore and Atlantic Railway	Duluth, Minnesota–Sault Ste. Marie, Michigan (with through trains to many eastern cities) [1908]	1890–1916
Boston Express	Pennsylvania, New Haven	Washington, D.C.–Boston [1895]	1892–1900
Boston Express	Minneapolis, St. Paul and Sault Ste. Marie, Canadian Pacific Railway	Minneapolis–Saint Paul–Montreal [1908]	1898–1910
Boston Limited	Boston & Albany, New York Central Railroad	Boston–Chicago [1894]	1894–1909
Boston Night Express	Boston & Albany	Boston–Albany, New York [1920]	1913–1922
Boston Special	Boston & Albany, New York Central Railroad	Boston–Chicago [1892]	1892–1909
Boston Special	New York Central	Boston–Chicago (with through trains to Toronto and Montreal) [1945]	1942–1946
Boston–New York Express	New Haven; New York Central	New York City–Boston [1938] New York City–Springfield, Massachusetts	1925–1951
Bostonian	New Haven (until 1968); Penn Central (1969–1971); Amtrak (since 1971)	New York City–Boston [1953]	1919–1977
Bowery	Amtrak	New York City–Washington, D.C. [1997]	1997–1998
Brainerd and International Falls Express	Northern Pacific Railway	Saint Paul, Minnesota–International Falls, Minnesota [1928]	1921–1946
Brazil and Mudlavia Express	Chicago, Indianapolis & Louisville	Chicago–Terre Haute, Indiana [1905]	1902–1906
Broadway Limited	Pennsylvania (1912–1969); Penn Central (1969–1971); Amtrak (1971–1995)	Chicago–Washington, D.C. [1930] Chicago–New York City	1912–1995
Buckeye	Pennsylvania	Pittsburgh–Cleveland (Buckeye Limited 1916–1936) [1939]	1916-1948
Buckeye	Pennsylvania; Penn Central (1969–1971)	Chicago–Cincinnati and Columbus, Ohio [1958]	1957-1969
Buckeye	Pere Marquette Railway	Detroit–Columbus, Ohio [1930]	1928–1931
Budd Highlander	Boston and Maine	Boston–Albany, New York [1955]	1952-1958
Buffalo–Chicago Special	New York Central	Chicago–Buffalo, New York [1925]	1921–1927
Buffalo–Cincinnati Express	New York Central	Buffalo, New York–Cincinnati (with through trains to the south) [1934]	1934–1946
Buffalo - Pittsburgh - Detroit Special	New York Central	Buffalo, New York–Pittsburgh–Detroit [1925]	1922–1934
Buffalo - Pittsburgh - Toledo Special	New York Central	Buffalo, New York–Pittsburgh–Toledo, Ohio [1938]	1935–1940
Buffalo – Pittsburgh Express	New York Central and Pittsburgh and Lake Erie Railroad	Buffalo, New York–Pittsburgh [1942] (aka Buffalo and Pittsburgh Express)	1904–1917; 1929–1930; 1935–1961
Buffalo–Toronto Express	New York Central, Canadian Pacific Railway	New York City–Toronto [1945]	1943–1963
Buffalo and Chicago Express	Grand Trunk Western	New York, New York-Chicago, Illinois [1903]	1900–1907
Buffalo and Chicago Special	Lake Shore and Michigan Southern Railway	Buffalo, New York–Chicago [1910]	1906–1913
Buffalo and Chicago Special	Boston and Albany Railroad, New York Central Railroad	Boston–Chicago [1915]	1913–1920
Buffalo Day Express	Pennsylvania	Washington, D.C.–Buffalo, New York [1933]	1900–1968
Buffalo Express	Lehigh Valley Railroad, Grand Trunk Western Railroad	Toronto–Buffalo, New York [1905]	1902–1914
Buffalo Express	New York Central	Chicago–Buffalo, New York [1933]	1912–1943
Buffalo Limited	New York Central	New York, New York-Buffalo, New York [1903]	1902-1906
Buffalo Limited	Delaware, Lackawanna and Western Railroad	New York City–Buffalo, New York [1920]	1919–1926
Buffalo Limited	Pittsburgh and Lake Erie Railroad	Pittsburgh–Buffalo, New York [1930]	1919–1931
Buffalo Local	New York Central	Cincinnati–Buffalo, New York	?
Buffalo Mail	Delaware, Lackawanna and Western Railroad	New York City–Buffalo, New York [1930]	1919–1935
Buffalo Special	New York Central	New York City–Buffalo, New York [1908]	1892–1893; 1902–1914; 1919–1925
Buffalo Special	Pennsylvania Railroad	Pittsburgh–Buffalo, New York [1911]	1906–1916
Buffalo Train	Lehigh Valley Railroad, Grand Trunk Western Railroad	New York City–Chicago [1907]	1902–1914
Buffalonian	West Shore Railroad	New York City–Buffalo, New York (with sleeping cars to Chicago, St. Louis, and Boston) [1915]	1910–1925
Buffalonian	New York Central	New York City–Buffalo, New York [1924]	1915–1932
Buffalonian	Delaware, Lackawanna and Western Railroad	New York City–Buffalo, New York [1940]	1936–1941
Bullet	Central Railroad of New Jersey	Jersey City, New Jersey-Wilkes-Barre, Pennsylvania [1930]	1929–1931
Bullet	Pennsylvania Railroad	Wilmington, Delaware-Easton, Maryland [1938]	1937-c.1946
Bunker Hill	New Haven (until 1946), Amtrak (since 1971)	New York City–Boston [1972]	1940-1946; 1971–1975
Business Man's Special	Pere Marquette	Chicago–Grand Rapids, Michigan [1930]	1928–1932
Butte and Portland Special	Union Pacific	Salt Lake City–Butte, Montana–Portland, Oregon [1915]	1911–1920
Butte Express	Union Pacific	Salt Lake City–Butte, Montana–Boise, Idaho [1938]	1894–1895; 1915–1931; 1935–1941
Butte Special	Union Pacific	Salt Lake City–Butte, Montana [1952]	1921–1971
Butte - Northwest Express	Union Pacific	Salt Lake City–Butte, Montana–Spokane, Washington–Portland, Oregon [1935]	1932–1941
Butte - Portland Express	Union Pacific	Salt Lake City–Butte, Montana–Portland, Oregon [1912]	1911–1914
