= List of named passenger trains of the United States (I–M) =

This article contains a list of named passenger trains in the United States, with names beginning I through M.

== I ==
Train Name	Railroad	Train Endpoints in a typical [year]	Operated
Idaho Express	Union Pacific Railroad	Salt Lake City, Utah – Boise, Idaho [1932]	1911-1913; 1919–1924; 1932–1933; 1942–1946
Idahoan	Union Pacific Railroad	Cheyenne, Wyoming – Portland, Oregon [1948]	1947-1954
Illini	Illinois Central	Chicago, Illinois – Champaign, Illinois [1942]	1942-1949; 1969–1971
Illini	Amtrak	Chicago, Illinois – Carbondale, Illinois [2014]	1974–present
Illinois Zephyr	Amtrak	Chicago, Illinois – Quincy, Illinois [2015]	1971–present
Illmo Limited	Illinois Terminal Railroad	St. Louis, Missouri – Peoria, Illinois [1941]	1929-1948
Imperial	Southern Pacific	Los Angeles, California – Calexico, California [1931]	1931-1941
Imperial	Southern Pacific, Chicago, Rock Island and Pacific Railroad	Chicago, Illinois – Los Angeles, California [1948]	1947-1958
Independence	Amtrak	New York, New York – Washington, DC [1985]	1982-1995
Indian Head	Chicago and North Western Railway	Chicago, Illinois – Drummond, Wisconsin [1948]	1948-1952
Indiana Connection			see Calumet
Indiana Special	Cleveland, Cincinnati, Chicago and St. Louis Railway	Detroit, Michigan – Indianapolis, Indiana [1920]	1919-1921; 1925–1939
Indianapolis Express	New York Central	Detroit, Michigan – St. Louis, Missouri (with many different endpoints over the years) [1952]	1917-1920; 1931–1957
Indianapolis Limited	Cleveland, Cincinnati, Chicago and St. Louis Railway	Cincinnati, Ohio – Indianapolis, Indiana [1923]	1921-1929
Indianapolis Limited	Pennsylvania	New York, New York – Indianapolis, Indiana [1950]	1950; 1953–1957
Indianapolis Midnight Special	Pennsylvania	Chicago, Illinois – Louisville, Kentucky [1908]	1906-1910
Indianapolis Special	Cleveland, Cincinnati, Chicago and St. Louis Railway	Cleveland, Ohio – Indianapolis, Indiana [1920]	1919-1924; 1929–1932
Inter-American	Amtrak	St. Louis, Missouri – Laredo, Texas [1975]	1973–1981
Inter-City Express	New York Central	Buffalo, New York – Syracuse, New York [1927]	1927-1931
Inter-City Limited	Grand Trunk Western and Canadian National	Chicago, Illinois – Montreal, Quebec [1948]	1927-c.1965
Inter-State Limited	Chicago North Shore and Milwaukee Railroad	Chicago, Illinois – Milwaukee, Wisconsin [1929]	1929-1933
International (group of trains)	Great Northern	Seattle, Washington – Vancouver, British Columbia	1950–1971
International Express	Pennsylvania	Philadelphia, Pennsylvania – Harrisburg, Pennsylvania [1930]	1913-1937
International Limited	Grand Trunk Western and Canadian National	Chicago, Illinois – Toronto, Ontario [1955]	1901-1910; 1919–1971
International Limited	Amtrak and Via	Chicago, Illinois – Toronto, Ontario [1990]	1982–2004
International Limited	Great Northern	Portland, Oregon – Vancouver, British Columbia [1935]	1911-1924; 1931–1946
Interstate Express	New York Central	Chicago, Illinois – Boston, Massachusetts [1952]	1921-1958
Interstate Express	Reading–CNJ–Lackawanna	Philadelphia, Pennsylvania – Syracuse, New York [1950]	1929-1957
Iowa and Dakota Express	Chicago and North Western Railway	Chicago, Illinois – Hawarden, Iowa [1916]	1897; 1914–1924
Iowa Express	Chicago Great Western	Minneapolis–Saint Paul – Kansas City, Missouri [1912]	1912-1930
Iowa-Nebraska Limited	Chicago, Rock Island and Pacific Railroad	Chicago, Illinois – Lincoln, Nebraska [1930]	1925-1946
Iowan	Illinois Central	Chicago, Illinois – Sioux City, Iowa [1948]	1931-1952
Iron and Copper Country Express	Chicago and North Western Railway	Chicago, Illinois – Ishpeming, Michigan [1948]	1914-1958
Iron City Express	Pennsylvania	New York, New York – Pittsburgh, Pennsylvania [1913]	1909-1953
Iron Country Limited	Chicago, Milwaukee, St. Paul and Pacific Railroad	Chicago, Illinois – Iron River, Michigan [1933]	1931-1938
Iron Range Express	Chicago and North Western Railway	Chicago, Illinois Menomonie, Wisconsin [1915]	1900-1901; 1914–1936
Iroquois	New York Central	New York, New York – Boston, Massachusetts – Chicago, Illinois [1948]	1926-1967
Irvin S. Cobb	Illinois Central	Louisville, Kentucky – Memphis, Tennessee [1952]	1949-1955
Islander	New York, New Haven & Hartford	Boston, Massachusetts, then New York, New York – Woods Hole, Massachusetts [1931]	1937-1942

== J ==
Train Name	Railroad	Train Endpoints in a typical [year]	Operated
James River	Amtrak	Richmond, Virginia – Newport News, Virginia [1995]	1995-1998
James Whitcomb Riley	New York Central	Chicago, Illinois – Cincinnati, Ohio [1948]	1941–1971
James Whitcomb Riley	Amtrak	Chicago, Illinois – Washington, DC [1975]	1971–1977
Jeffersonian	Pennsylvania	New York, New York – St Louis, Missouri [1948]	1941-1953
Jeffersonian	Amtrak	New York, New York – Washington, DC [1985]	1982-1990
Jet Rocket	Rock Island	Chicago, Illinois – Peoria, Illinois [1956]	1956–1957
Joe Wheeler	Southern	Oakdale, Tennessee – Tuscumbia, Alabama [1940]	c.1940-c.1946
John Adams	Amtrak	Boston, Massachusetts – Philadelphia, Pennsylvania [1977]	1977
John Quincy Adams	New Haven Railroad	New York, New York – Boston, Massachusetts	1957-?
John Wilkes	Lehigh Valley	New York, New York – Coxton, Pennsylvania – Wilkes-Barre, Pennsylvania [1942]	1939-1961
Judiciary	Pennsylvania	New York, New York – Washington, DC [1952]	1933-1955
Judith Special	Great Northern	Lewiston, Idaho – Great Falls, Montana [1920]	1919-1924
Juniata	Pennsylvania Railroad; Penn Central	New York, New York – Pittsburgh, Pennsylvania [1952]	1927-1934; 1938–1971

== K ==
Train Name	Railroad	Train Endpoints in a typical [year]	Operated
Kalamazoo, Grand Rapids and Detroit Express	Michigan Central Railroad	Chicago, Illinois – Grand Rapids, Michigan [1916]	1916-1920
Kansas City and Chicago Fast Mail	Santa Fe	Kansas City, Missouri – Galveston, Texas [1911]	1906-1916
Kansas City and St. Louis Express	Missouri Pacific	St. Louis, Missouri – Denver, Colorado [1903]	1900-1910
Kansas City Chief	Santa Fe	Chicago, Illinois – Kansas City, Missouri [1950]	1950-1968
Kansas City Day Express	Alton Railroad	St. Louis, Missouri – Kansas City, Missouri [1892]	1892-1900
Kansas City Express	St. Louis-San Francisco	Kansas City, Missouri – Memphis, Tennessee [1905]	1902-1908
Kansas City Express	Missouri-Kansas-Texas	Kansas City, Missouri – Galveston, Texas [1908]	1904-1910; 1915–1916; 1921–1926
Kansas City Express	Union Pacific Railroad	Kansas City, Missouri – Cheyenne, Wyoming [1922]	1921-1934
Kansas City Express	Kansas City Southern Railway	Kansas City, Missouri – Port Arthur, Texas [1930]	1929-1932
Kansas City Express	Chicago, Rock Island and Pacific Railroad	Chicago, Illinois – Kansas City, Missouri [1932]	1932-1936
Kansas City Express	Wabash Railroad	St. Louis, Missouri – Kansas City, Missouri [1940]	1937-1947
Kansas City Flyer	Santa Fe	Kansas City, Missouri – Galveston, Texas [1912]	1910-1916
Kansas City Limited	Chicago Great Western	Minneapolis–Saint Paul – Kansas City, Missouri [1922]	1896-1901; 1922–1926
Kansas City Mail	St. Louis-San Francisco	Kansas City, Missouri – Dallas, Texas [1902]	1898-1908
Kansas City Mule	Amtrak	St. Louis, Missouri – Kansas City, Missouri [1983]	1980–2009
Kansas City Rocket	Chicago, Rock Island and Pacific Railroad	Minneapolis–Saint Paul – Kansas City, Missouri [1960]	1957-1962
Kansas City Special	Chicago Great Western	Minneapolis–Saint Paul – Kansas City, Missouri [1916]	1898-1909; 1912–1918
Kansas City Vestibuled Limited	Alton Railroad	St. Louis, Missouri – Kansas City, Missouri [1901]	1892-1904
Kansas City Zephyr	Chicago, Burlington & Quincy	Chicago, Illinois – Kansas City, Missouri	1953–1968
Kansas City - Florida Special	St. Louis-San Francisco – Southern – Atlantic Coast Line – Florida East Coast	Kansas City, Missouri – Miami, Florida (endpoints differed over the years) [1948]	1902–1965
Kansas City - Hot Springs Express	Missouri Pacific	Hot Springs, Arkansas – Kansas City, Missouri	?
Kansas Cityan	Santa Fe	Chicago, Illinois – Kansas City, Missouri – Oklahoma City, Oklahoma [1952]	1915-1933; 1938–1968
Kansas Fast Mail	Santa Fe	Kansas City, Missouri – Purcell, Oklahoma [1910]	1910-1918
Kansas Limited	St. Louis-San Francisco	St. Louis, Missouri – Galveston, Texas [1925]	1905; 1917–1928
Kansas Mail	St. Louis-San Francisco	St. Louis, Missouri – Wichita, Kansas [1922]	1921-1927
Katahdin	Boston and Maine, Maine Central Railroad Company	Boston, Massachusetts – Bangor, Maine [1953]	1951-1958
Kate Shelley 400	Chicago and North Western	Chicago, Illinois – Cedar Rapids, Iowa [1955]	1955–1971
Katy Flyer	Missouri-Kansas-Texas	St. Louis, Missouri – San Antonio, Texas (various endpoints over the years) [1948]	1896; 1900–1959
Katy Limited	Missouri-Kansas-Texas	Kansas City, Missouri – Fort Worth, Texas [1948]	1910-1951
Kay-See Flyer	Missouri Pacific Railroad	St. Louis, Missouri – Kansas City, Missouri	?
Kennebec Limited	Boston and Maine, Maine Central Railroad Company	Boston, Massachusetts – Bangor, Maine [1953]	1937-1958
Kentuckian	Chesapeake and Ohio Railway	Chicago, Illinois – St. Louis, Missouri – Washington, DC – Newport News, Virginia [1930]	1929-1933
Kentuckian	Pennsylvania	Chicago, Illinois – Louisville, Kentucky [1935]	1935-1968
Kentucky Cardinal	Illinois Central	Louisville, Kentucky – Fulton, Kentucky [1952]	1950-1953
Kentucky Cardinal	Amtrak	Chicago, Illinois – Louisville, Kentucky [2000]	1999–2003
Key West Express	Florida East Coast Railway	Jacksonville, Florida – Key West, Florida [1924]	1910-1926
Keystone (group of trains)	Amtrak	New York, New York – Harrisburg, Pennsylvania (1980)	1971-1972; 1980–1981; 1991–2007
Keystone Executive	Amtrak	Philadelphia, Pennsylvania – Harrisburg, Pennsylvania [1984]	1983-1988
Keystone Express	Delaware, Lackawanna and Western Railroad	Scranton, Pennsylvania – Pittsburgh, Pennsylvania (1939)	1936-1949
Keystone Express	Pennsylvania	New York, New York – St. Louis, Missouri (various endpoints over the years) [1914]	1891-1896; 1904–1931; 1937–1940
Keystone Express	Delaware, Lackawanna and Western Railroad	Scranton, Pennsylvania – Pittsburgh, Pennsylvania (1939)	c.1936-c.1947
Keystone State Express	Amtrak	New York, New York – Harrisburg, Pennsylvania (1980)	1991-1995
King Coal	Reading	Philadelphia, Pennsylvania – Shamokin, Pennsylvania [1951]	1950-1964
Klamath	Southern Pacific	San Francisco, California – Portland, Oregon [1952]	1929-1955
Knickerbocker	New York Central	New York, New York – St. Louis, Missouri (various endpoints over the years) [1948]	1895-1967
Knickerbocker	Amtrak	New York, New York – Albany, New York [1991]	1974-1976; 1991–1994
Knickerbocker Limited	New Haven Railroad	New York, New York – Boston, Massachusetts [1925]	1902-1932

== L ==
Train Name	Railroad	Train Endpoints	Operated
La Salle	Chicago and Eastern Illinois Railroad	Chicago, Illinois – St. Louis, Missouri [1928]	1925-1933
La Salle	Grand Trunk Western and Canadian National	Chicago, Illinois – Toronto, Ontario – Montreal, Quebec [1938]	1937-c.1965
La Salle Street Limited	Chicago, Rock Island and Pacific Railroad	Chicago, Illinois – Omaha, Nebraska [1942]	1935-1953
Lackawanna Limited	Delaware, Lackawanna and Western Railroad	Hoboken, New Jersey – Buffalo, New York [1948]	1901-1949
Lackawanna Special	Delaware, Lackawanna and Western Railroad	Hoboken, New Jersey – Buffalo, New York [1926]	1925-1936
Lake Cities	Erie Railroad, later Erie Lackawanna	Chicago, Illinois – Hoboken, New Jersey [1952]	1929–1970
Lake Cities	Amtrak	Chicago, Illinois – Toledo, Ohio (1980–1995) [1980] Chicago, Illinois – Pontiac, Michigan (1995–2004) [1995]	1980–2004
Lake Cities Special	New York Central	Detroit, Michigan – Pittsburgh, Pennsylvania [1935]	1926-1952
Lake Country Limited	Amtrak	Chicago, Illinois – Janesville, Wisconsin [2000]	2000–2001
Lake Erie	New York Central	Albany, New York – Buffalo, New York [1930]	1927-1931
Lake Shore	Amtrak	Chicago, Illinois – New York, New York [1971]	1971–1972
Lake Shore Limited	Amtrak	Chicago, Illinois – New York, New York – Boston, Massachusetts [1980]	1975–present
Lake Shore Limited	New York Central	Chicago, Illinois – New York, New York [1948]	1897–1956
Lake Superior Limited	Duluth, South Shore & Atlantic	Houghton, Michigan – St. Ignace, Michigan (with through trains to many other destinations) [1900]	1893-1900
Lake Superior Limited	Northern Pacific Railway	Minneapolis–Saint Paul – Duluth, Minnesota [1928]	1901-1905; 1921–1930
The Laker	Soo Line	Chicago, Illinois – Duluth, Minnesota [1952]	1951–1965
Land O'Corn	Illinois Central	Chicago, Illinois – Waterloo, Iowa [1960]	1941-1967
Lark	Southern Pacific	San Francisco, California – Los Angeles, California [1948]	1911–1968
Las Vegas Holiday Special	Union Pacific Railroad	Los Angeles, California – Las Vegas, Nevada [1965]	1962-1967
Las Vegas Limited	Amtrak	Los Angeles, California – Las Vegas, Nevada [1976]	1976
LaSalle	Amtrak	Chicago, Illinois – Milwaukee, Wisconsin [1984]	1980–1989
Laurentian	Delaware & Hudson, New York Central, Canadian Pacific Railway	New York, New York – Montreal, Quebec [1948]	1923–1971
Legion	Pennsylvania Railroad	New York, New York – Washington, D.C. [1948]	1944-1952
Legionnaire	Chicago Great Western	Minneapolis–St. Paul – Chicago, – Kansas City, Missouri [1930]	1925-1930 (renamed "The Minnesotan")
Legislator	Pennsylvania Railroad	Washington, DC – New York, New York [1952]	1932–1971
Lehigh Express	Grand Trunk Western, Lehigh Valley Railroad	New York, New York – Philadelphia, Pennsylvania – Chicago, Illinois [1912]	1894-1914
Lehigh Limited	Lehigh Valley Railroad	New York, New York – Buffalo, New York (with through trains to many other cities) [1930]	1917-1936
Lehigh-Pennsylvania Express	Lehigh Valley Railroad, Pennsylvania Railroad	Pittsburgh, Pennsylvania – Phillipsburg, New Jersey [1918]	1916-1932
Lexington Special	Louisville and Nashville Railroad	Cincinnati, Ohio – Lexington, Kentucky [1922]	1921-1935
Liberty Bell	Amtrak	Washington, DC – New York, New York [1995]	1995-1998
Liberty Express	Amtrak	Philadelphia, Pennsylvania – Boston, Massachusetts [1980]	1979–1982
Liberty Limited	Pennsylvania Railroad	Chicago, Illinois – Washington, DC [1948]	1925-1957
Lincoln Limited	Chicago and Alton	Chicago, Illinois – St. Louis, Missouri [1930]	1925-1935
Lincoln Service	Amtrak	Chicago, Illinois – St. Louis, Missouri	2006–present
Litchfield	New Haven Railroad	New York, New York – Pittsfield, Massachusetts [1960]	1956-1968
Lock Haven Express	Pennsylvania Railroad	Philadelphia, Pennsylvania – Williamsport, Pennsylvania [1923]	1923-1933
Lone Star	St. Louis Southwestern	Memphis, Tennessee – Dallas, Texas [1948]	1928–1952
Lone Star	Amtrak	Chicago, Illinois – Dallas, Texas; Chicago, Illinois – Houston, Texas [1974]	1974–1979
Lone Star Limited	Texas Midland Railroad	Paris, Texas – Ennis, Texas (with through cars to St. Louis and Galveston) [1902]	1902-1912
Lookout	Nashville, Chattanooga and St. Louis Railway	Nashville, Tennessee – Chattanooga, Tennessee (with through cars to New York) [1933]	1932-1946
Loop	Amtrak	Chicago, Illinois – Springfield, Illinois [1990]	1986-1996
Los Angeles Challenger	Chicago and North Western, Union Pacific Railroad	Chicago, Illinois – Los Angeles, California [1938]	1938-1948
Los Angeles Express	Santa Fe	Chicago, Illinois – Los Angeles, California [1910]	1905-1916
Los Angeles Limited	Chicago and North Western, Union Pacific Railroad	Chicago, Illinois – Los Angeles, California [1948]	1906-1953
Louisiana Daylight	Texas and Pacific	New Orleans, Louisiana – Fort Worth, Texas [1950]	1949-1963
Louisiana Eagle	Texas and Pacific	New Orleans, Louisiana – Fort Worth, Texas [1950]	1949-1963
Louisiana Limited	Texas and Pacific	New Orleans, Louisiana – Fort Worth, Texas (with through cars to other points) [1930]	1913-1949
Louisiana Sunshine Special	Missouri Pacific	Little Rock, Arkansas – Lake Charles, Louisiana [1948]	1925-1930; 1948–1960
Louisiane	Illinois Central	Chicago, Illinois and Louisville, Kentucky – New Orleans, Louisiana [1952]	1931-1967
Louisville and Cincinnati Limited	Illinois Central	Cincinnati, Ohio – New Orleans, Louisiana [1902]	1897-1910; 1917–1918
Louisville Daylight Express	Pennsylvania Railroad	Chicago, Illinois – Louisville, Kentucky [1930]	1911-1953
Louisville Express	Cleveland, Cincinnati, Chicago and St. Louis Railway	Chicago, Illinois – Louisville, Kentucky [1940]	1931-1941
Louisville Limited	Illinois Central	New Orleans, Louisiana – Louisville, Kentucky [1922]	1919-1930
Louisville Night Express	Pennsylvania Railroad	Chicago, Illinois – Louisville, Kentucky [1920]	1914-1920; 1934–1935
Louisville Special	Pennsylvania Railroad	Chicago, Illinois – Louisville, Kentucky [1904]	1904-1910

== M ==
Train Name	Railroad	Train Endpoints in a typical [year]	Operated
Mackinaw Island Express	Detroit and Mackinac Railway, Michigan Central Railroad	Detroit, Michigan – Alpena, Michigan [1930]	1919-1935
Mahaiwe	New Haven Railroad	New York, New York – Pittsfield, Massachusetts [1960]	1956-1960
Mahkeenac	New Haven Railroad	New York, New York – Pittsfield, Massachusetts [1960]	1954-1960
Mail and Express	Missouri-Kansas-Texas	Kansas City, Missouri – Dallas, Texas [1916]	1903-1911; 1915–1916; 1920
Mail and Express	Texas Midland Railroad	Paris, Texas – Ennis, Texas (with through cars to Galveston) [1903]	1902-1911
Mail and Express	Wabash Railroad	St. Louis, Missouri – Toledo, Ohio [1910]	1909-1915
Mail and Express	Pennsylvania Railroad	New York, New York – Pittsburgh, Pennsylvania [1953]	1951-1961
Mail Express	Amtrak	Washington, DC – Boston, Massachusetts [1985]	1984-1990
Main Line Express	Pennsylvania Railroad	Philadelphia, Pennsylvania – Pittsburgh, Pennsylvania [1925]	1893-1930
Maine Coast Special	Canadian National	Montreal, Quebec – Berlin, New Hampshire -- Portland, Maine [1938]	c.1938
Mainstreeter	Northern Pacific, Chicago, Burlington and Quincy Railroad, Spokane, Portland and Seattle Railway (1952–1970); Burlington Northern (1970–1971)	Chicago, Illinois – Seattle, Washington (1952–1970); St. Paul, Minnesota – Seattle, Washington (1970–1971)	1952-1971
Major	Lehigh Valley Railroad	New York, New York – Buffalo, New York [1955]	1954-1958
Man O' War	Central of Georgia	Atlanta, Georgia – Columbus, Georgia [1953]	1947–1971
Manhattan	Amtrak	Washington, DC – New York, New York [1991]	1991
Manhattan Limited	Pennsylvania Railroad, Penn Central	Chicago, Illinois – New York, New York [1958]	1903-1971
Manhattan Limited	Amtrak	New York, New York – Philadelphia, Pennsylvania [1982]	1981-1984
Manitoba Express	Minneapolis, St. Paul and Sault Ste. Marie Railway and Canadian Pacific Railway	St. Paul, Minnesota – Winnipeg, Manitoba [1905]	1904–1918
Manitoba Limited	Northern Pacific Railway	St. Paul, Minnesota – Winnipeg, Manitoba [1930]	1914-1915, 1921–1946
Maple Leaf	Grand Trunk Western Railroad and Canadian National	Chicago, Illinois (Dearborn Station) – Toronto, Ontario – Montreal, Quebec (with through cars to New York) [1938]	1927–1971
Maple Leaf	Via/Amtrak	New York, New York – Toronto, Ontario [1985]	1981–present
Maple Leaf	Lehigh Valley, Reading Company; Canadian National	New York, New York – Philadelphia, Pennsylvania – Toronto, Ontario [1940]	1937-1961
Marathon	Missouri Pacific	Kansas City, Missouri – Omaha, Nebraska [1935]	1935-1939
Mariner	Pennsylvania Railroad	Philadelphia, Pennsylvania – Cape Charles, Virginia [1944]	1944-1947
Mark Twain Zephyr	Chicago, Burlington & Quincy	St. Louis, Missouri – Burlington, Iowa [1948]	1936-1952
Marquette	Milwaukee Road	Chicago, Illinois – Mason City, Iowa [1940]	1938-1950
Marquette	Pere Marquette	Chicago, Illinois – Grand Rapids, Michigan	
Marquette	Amtrak	Chicago, Illinois – Milwaukee, Wisconsin [1982]	1980-1983
Marylander	Baltimore and Ohio Railroad, Reading Railroad, and Central Railroad of New Jersey	Washington, DC – Jersey City, New Jersey [1940]	1938–1956
Matinee	New York, Susquehanna and Western Railway	New York, New York – Paterson, New Jersey [1953]	1950-1957
Maumee	New York Central	Chicago, Illinois – Toledo, Ohio (with through cars to other points) [1930]	1928-1948
Mayflower	New York, New Haven and Hartford Railroad	Boston, Massachusetts – New York, New York [1954]	1906-1907; 1925–1948; 1952–1968
Mayflower	Amtrak	Washington, DC – Boston, Massachusetts [1995]	1974; 1992–1998
Meadowlark	Chicago & Eastern Illinois	Chicago, Illinois – Cypress, Illinois [1950]	1946–1962
Memphian	St. Louis-San Francisco	St. Louis, Missouri – Birmingham, Alabama (endpoints varied widely by year) [1952]	1923–1958
Memphis and New Orleans Limited	Illinois Central	Cincinnati, Ohio – New Orleans, Louisiana (with sleeping cars to the west coast) [1903]	1902-1910
Memphis Express	St. Louis-San Francisco	St. Louis, Missouri – Memphis, Tennessee [1907]	1906-1908; 1917–1921; 1925
Memphis Mail	Chicago, Rock Island and Pacific Railroad	Memphis, Tennessee – Amarillo, Texas [1921]	1906-1910; 1921–1924
Memphis Special	Pennsylvania Railroad, Norfolk and Western Railway, Southern Railway	New York, New York – Memphis, Tennessee [1938]	1909-1941
Memphis-Atlanta Express	St. Louis-San Francisco, Southern Railway	Memphis, Tennessee – Atlanta, Georgia [1920]	1917-1924; 1933–1935
Memphis-Californian	Rock Island, Southern Pacific	Memphis, Tennessee – Los Angeles, California [1948]	1923–1949
Memphis, Nashville and New Orleans Express	Illinois Central, Nashville, Chattanooga and St. Louis Railway	St. Louis, Missouri – Nashville, Tennessee – New Orleans, Louisiana [1903]	1902-1910
Mercantile Express	Pennsylvania Railroad	New York, New York – Washington, DC – Cleveland, Ohio – Chicago, Illinois [1930]	1913-1942
Merchants Express	Delaware, Lackawanna and Western Railroad	Hoboken, New Jersey – Scranton, Pennsylvania [1948]	1937-1959
Merchants Limited	New York, New Haven and Hartford Railroad (to 1969), Penn Central (1969–1971), Amtrak (from 1971)	New York, New York – Boston, Massachusetts	1903–1998
Mercury	New York Central	Detroit, Michigan – Cleveland, Ohio (1936–1939) [1938] Detroit, Michigan – Chicago, Illinois (1939–1949) [1944]	1936–1949
Meteor	St. Louis-San Francisco Railway	St. Louis, Missouri – Oklahoma City, Oklahoma [1948]	1902-1965
Meteor	San Francisco - Sacramento Railroad	San Francisco, California – Chico, California [1924]	1924-1927
Metroliner (type of train)	Penn Central (1968–1971); Amtrak (1971–2006)	New York, New York – Washington, DC	1968–2006
Metropolitan	New York Central	New York, New York – Boston, Massachusetts – Chicago, Illinois [1907]	1905-1928
Metropolitan	Amtrak	New York, New York – Washington, DC [1981]	1981-1982
Metropolitan Express	Pennsylvania Railroad	Chicago, Illinois – New York, New York [1913]	1913-1925
Metropolitan Express	Baltimore and Ohio Railroad	Jersey City, New Jersey – St. Louis, Missouri [1908]	1905-1916
Metropolitan Special	Baltimore and Ohio Railroad	Washington, DC – St. Louis, Missouri [1952]	1919–1971
Mexico Express	Santa Fe	Albuquerque, New Mexico – El Paso, Texas [1920]	1906-1932
Mexico Limited	Missouri Pacific Railroad	St. Louis, Missouri – San Antonio, Texas (with through cars to Mexico) [1924]	1923-1927
Miamian	Pennsylvania Railroad, Richmond, Fredericksburg and Potomac Railroad, Atlantic Coast Line Railroad, Florida East Coast Railway	New York, New York – Miami, Florida [1941]	1927-1941; 1946–1962
Michigan	New York Central	Chicago, Illinois – Detroit, Michigan [1953]	1937-1938; 1946–1967
Michigan	Canadian Pacific Railway, New York Central Railroad	Chicago, Illinois – Toronto, Ontario [1934]	1928-1957
Michigan Central Limited	Michigan Central	New York, New York – Chicago, Illinois [1922]	1905-1923
Michigan Executive	Amtrak	Detroit, Michigan – Jackson, Michigan [1980]	1975-1983
Michigan Express	Cleveland, Cincinnati, Chicago and St. Louis Railway	Detroit, Michigan – Cincinnati, Ohio [1927]	1915-1928; 1939–1941
Michigan Express	Pere Marquette Railway	Chicago, Illinois – Traverse City, Michigan [1920]	1920-1926
Michigan Special	New York Central	Detroit, Michigan – Cincinnati, Ohio [1933]	1930-1958
Michigan Wolverine	New York Central and its affiliates	Chicago, Illinois – New York, New York (with through cars to many other points) [1924]	1923-1928
Mid-American	Illinois Central	Chicago, Illinois – St. Louis, Missouri – Memphis, Tennessee [1970]	1968-1971
Mid-City Express	Pennsylvania and Wabash	Chicago, Illinois – Detroit, Michigan [1940]	1935-1949
Mid-Continent Special	Chicago, Rock Island and Pacific Railroad	Minneapolis–Saint Paul – Kansas City, Missouri [1948]	1925-1954
Mid-Day Limited	Cleveland, Cincinnati, Chicago and St. Louis Railway	New York, New York – Cincinnati, Ohio [1913]	1910-1920
Mid-West Limited	Chesapeake and Ohio Railway, Cleveland, Cincinnati, Chicago and St. Louis Railway	Washington, DC – St. Louis, Missouri [1925]	1923-1928
Midday Congressional	Pennsylvania Railroad	New York, New York – Washington, DC [1961]	1956-1971
Midday Keystone	Pennsylvania Railroad	New York, New York – Washington, DC [1956]	1956-1958
Middle West Express	Baltimore and Ohio Railroad	Jersey City, New Jersey – Chicago, Illinois [1922]	1917-1930
Midlander	Erie	Chicago, Illinois – Jersey City, New Jersey [1942]	1939–1947
Midnight	Wabash Railroad	Chicago, Illinois – St. Louis, Missouri [1945]	1942-1960
Midnight Express	New York Central	New York, New York – Albany, New York – Plattsburgh, New York (different endpoints in different years) [1916]	1893-1925
Midnight Express	New York, New Haven and Hartford Railroad	New York, New York – Boston, Massachusetts [1914]	1891-1897; 1905–1918
Midnight Express	Reading Railroad, Delaware, Lackawanna and Western Railroad	Philadelphia, Pennsylvania – Binghamton, New York [1924]	1923-1928
Midnight Keystone	Pennsylvania Railroad	New York, New York – Washington, DC [1956]	1956-1959
Midnight Limited (train)	Wabash Railroad	St. Louis, Missouri – Kansas City, Missouri [1955]	1908-1914; 1927; 1937–1960
Midnight Special	Chicago & Alton, from 1947 Gulf, Mobile & Ohio	Chicago, Illinois – St. Louis, Missouri [1955]	1901–1971
Midnight Special	New York Central and its affiliates	Cincinnati, Ohio – Cleveland, Ohio [1948]	1939-1958
Midnight Special	Chicago, Indianapolis & Louisville	Chicago, Illinois – Cincinnati, Ohio [1943]	1921-1952
Midnight Special	Amtrak	Washington, DC – Philadelphia, Pennsylvania [1994]	1994
Midnight Sun	Alaska Railroad	Anchorage, Alaska – Fairbanks, Alaska [1960]	1960
Midwest Hiawatha	Milwaukee Road	Chicago, Illinois – Sioux Falls, South Dakota (various endpoints over the years)[1952]	1940–1956
Midwestern	New York Central Railroad	Chicago, Illinois – Cincinnati, Ohio [1957]	1957–1959
Mill Cities Limited	Chicago Great Western	Minneapolis–Saint Paul – Kansas City, Missouri [1948]	1927-1952
Minneapolis-Kansas City Rocket	Chicago, Rock Island and Pacific Railroad	Minneapolis–Saint Paul – Kansas City, Missouri [1941]	1941-1944
Minneapolis-Sioux Falls-Yankton Night Express	Great Northern Railway	Minneapolis–Saint Paul – Yankton, South Dakota [1935]	1935-1940
Minnesota 400	Chicago & North Western	Mankato, Minnesota – Wyeville, Wisconsin [1948]	1936–1952
Minnesota and Black Hills Express	Chicago & North Western	Chicago, Illinois – Rapid City, South Dakota [1918]	1914-1937; 1948–1955
Minnesota Limited	Chicago, Burlington & Quincy	Chicago, Illinois – Minneapolis–Saint Paul [1916]	1910-1918; 1922–1926
Minnesota Marquette	Milwaukee Road	Chicago, Illinois – Minneapolis–Saint Paul [1948]	1939-1950
Minnesotan	Chicago Great Western	Chicago, Illinois – Minneapolis–Saint Paul [1933]	1930-1956 (name dropped in 1949)
Minute Man	Boston and Maine	Boston, Massachusetts – Troy, New York [1948]	1927–1957
Minute Man	Amtrak	Boston, Massachusetts – Philadelphia, Pennsylvania (1972–1973) Boston – Washington, DC (1973–1998)	1973–1998
Miss Lou	Illinois Central	Jackson, Mississippi – New Orleans, Louisiana [1944]	1942–1949
Missionary	Santa Fe	Chicago, Illinois – Kansas City, Missouri (and points beyond in many years) [1935]	1915–1936
Mississippi Valley	Chicago, Burlington & Quincy, Northern Pacific Railway	St. Louis, Missouri – Portland, Oregon [1920]	1911-1936
Missouri Limited	Chicago, Burlington & Quincy	Chicago, Illinois – Kansas City, Missouri [1930]	1909-1918; 1923–1931
Missouri River Eagle	Missouri Pacific	St. Louis, Missouri – Omaha, Nebraska [1948]	1940–1971
Missouri River Express	Chicago & North Western	Minneapolis–Saint Paul – Omaha, Nebraska [1924]	1913-1926
Missouri River Flyer	Santa Fe	Denver, Colorado – La Junta, Colorado [1913]	1902-1904; 1907–1915
Missouri River Runner	Amtrak	St. Louis, Missouri – Kansas City, Missouri [2010]	2009–present
Missouri State Express	Chicago and Alton	St. Louis, Missouri – Kansas City, Missouri [1901]	1901-1905
Missourian	Missouri Pacific	St. Louis, Missouri – Kansas City, Missouri [1948]	1925–1963
Missourian	New York Central	St. Louis, Missouri – New York, New York [1928]	1928–1958
Mohawk	Grand Trunk Western	Chicago, Illinois – Detroit, Michigan	1967–1971
Mohawk	New York Central	New York, New York – Buffalo, New York (many different endpoints over the years) [1948]	1911–1963
Mohawk	Amtrak	New York, New York – Schenectady, New York [1991]	1981-1985; 1991–1998
Mohawk and Hudson River Express	West Shore Railroad	New York, New York – Albany, New York [1903]	1899-1916
Mondamin	Chicago & North Western	Minneapolis, Minnesota – Sioux City, Iowa [1948]	1931-1952
Monmouth Express	Pennsylvania	Philadelphia, Pennsylvania – Long Branch, New Jersey [1930]	1920-1932
Montreal and Boston Express	Soo Line Railroad, Canadian Pacific Railway, Boston and Maine	Minneapolis–Saint Paul – Boston, Massachusetts [1916]	1890-1893; 1903–1916
Montreal Express	New York Central, Rutland Railroad, Delaware and Hudson Railway	New York, New York – Montreal, Quebec [1916]	1902-1924
Montreal Express	Canadian Pacific Railway, Wabash Railroad	Chicago, Illinois – Toronto, Ontario – Montreal, Quebec [1903]	1903-1909
Montreal Express	Grand Trunk Western Railroad, Boston and Maine	Chicago, Illinois – Montreal, Quebec – Boston, Massachusetts [1916]	1908-1917
Montreal Limited	Delaware & Hudson, New York Central	New York, New York – Montreal, Quebec [1948]	1925-1971
Montrealer	Pennsylvania Railroad, New Haven, Boston & Maine, Central Vermont, and Canadian National	Washington, DC – Montreal, Quebec [1952]	1924–1966
Montrealer	Amtrak	Washington, DC – Montreal, Quebec [1981]	1972–1995
Morning Congressional	Pennsylvania	New York, New York – Washington, DC [1956]	1950-1971
Morning Daylight	Southern Pacific	Los Angeles, California – San Francisco, California [1941]	1940–1952
Morning Executive	Amtrak	New York, New York – Washington, DC [1971]	1971-1972
Morning Express	Northern Pacific Railway	Minneapolis–Saint Paul – Duluth, Minnesota [1902]	1901-1905
Morning Express	New Haven Railroad	New York, New York – Boston, Massachusetts [1912]	1905-1913
Morning Flyer	Grand Rapids & Indiana	Chicago, Illinois – Grand Rapids, Michigan [1905]	1904-1911
Morning Hiawatha	Milwaukee Road	Chicago, Illinois – St. Paul, Minnesota [1948]	1939–1971
Morning Keystone	Pennsylvania	New York, New York – Washington, DC [1957]	1956-1959
Morning Liberty Express	Amtrak	Boston, Massachusetts – Philadelphia, Pennsylvania [1978]	1978-1979
Morning Puget Sounder	Great Northern Railway	Seattle, Washington – Vancouver, British Columbia [1947]	1946-1950
Morning Star	St. Louis Southwestern	St. Louis, Missouri – Dallas, Texas [1948] Memphis, Tennessee – Dallas, Texas [1952]	1941–1950
Morning Steel King	New York Central, Erie Railroad	Pittsburgh, Pennsylvania – Cleveland, Ohio [1958]	1953-1962
Morning Steeler	Pennsylvania	Pittsburgh, Pennsylvania – Cleveland, Ohio [1952] (earlier years New York endpoint)	1950–1957
Morning Zephyr	Chicago, Burlington & Quincy	Chicago, Illinois – Minneapolis–St. Paul [1938]	1936-1971
Motor City Special	New York Central	Chicago, Illinois – Detroit, Michigan [1922]	1917-1965
Motor Queen	New York Central	Detroit, Michigan – Cincinnati, Ohio [1929]	1929
Mound City	Illinois Terminal Railroad	St. Louis, Missouri – Peoria, Illinois [1950]	1949–1956
Mound City Limited	Baltimore and Ohio Railroad	Cincinnati, Ohio – St. Louis, Missouri [1908]	1905-1916
Mound City Special	Cleveland, Cincinnati, Chicago and St. Louis Railway	Cincinnati, Ohio – St. Louis, Missouri – Cleveland, Ohio [1935]	1925-1936
Mount Adams	Amtrak	Seattle, Washington – Portland, Oregon [1995]	1995-1997
Mount Baker International	Amtrak	Seattle, Washington – Vancouver, British Columbia [1996]	1996-1997
Mount Rainier	Amtrak	Seattle, Washington – Portland, Oregon [1978]	1974-1995
Mount Royal	New York Central, Boston & Maine, Rutland, and Canadian National	New York, New York and Boston, Massachusetts – Montreal, Quebec [1952]	1925-1953
Mount Vernon	Pennsylvania; Amtrak from 1976	New York, New York – Washington, DC [1956]	1933-1971; 1976; 1980–1991; 1997–1998
Mountain Bluebird	Chicago and North Western, Union Pacific Railroad	Chicago, Illinois – Denver, Colorado [1933]	1931-1937
Mountain Express	Erie	Jersey City, New Jersey – Port Jervis, New York [1938]	1931; 1936–1953
Mountain Special	Delaware, Lackawanna and Western Railroad	Hoboken, New Jersey – Scranton, Pennsylvania [1935]	1921; 1935–1952
Mountaineer	Minneapolis, St. Paul and Sault Ste. Marie Railway	Chicago, Illinois – Vancouver, British Columbia [1948], later Minneapolis-St. Paul – Vancouver, British Columbia	1932-1955
Mountaineer (Boston and Maine)	Maine Central and Boston & Maine	Boston, Massachusetts – Littleton, New Hampshire [1948]	1947-1955
Mountaineer	Amtrak	Chicago, Illinois – Norfolk, Virginia [1975]	1975-1976
Mountaineer	Pennsylvania	Philadelphia, Pennsylvania – Wilkes-Barre, Pennsylvania [1908]	1901-1934
Mountaineer	Denver and Rio Grande Western Railroad	Denver, Colorado – Montrose, Colorado [1948]	1936-1959
Mudlavia and Brazil Express	Chicago and Eastern Illinois Railroad	Chicago, Illinois – Terre Haute, Indiana [1902]	1902-1906
Murray Hill	New Haven Railroad	New York, New York – Boston, Massachusetts [1945]	1940-1971
Murray Hill	Amtrak	New York, New York – Boston, Massachusetts [1975]	1973-1981
