= List of named passenger trains of Africa =

This article contains a list of named passenger trains of Africa, listed by each country.

== South Africa ==
Train name	Operator	Train endpoints	Operated
Blue Train	Transnet Freight Rail	Pretoria-Cape Town	1937–present
Trans Karoo Express	Transnet Freight Rail	Pretoria–Cape Town	?–1997
Metrorail	Passenger Rail Agency of South Africa	Johannesburg-Pretoria	1990-Present

== Kenya ==
Train name	Railroad	Train endpoints	Operated
Lunatic Express	Rift Valley Railways	Mombasa–Nairobi–Kisumu	1904–present

== Zambia ==
Train name	Railroad	Train endpoints	Operated
Zambezi Train	Zambia Railways	Livingstone–Lusaka	?- Present

== Zimbabwe ==
Train name	Railroad	Train endpoints	Operated
Elephant Express	Imvelo Safari Lodges	Dete–Ngamo, Hwange National Park	2014- Present
