= Lists of named passenger trains =

In the history of rail transport, dating back to the 19th century, there have been hundreds of named passenger trains. These have been organized into lists by geographical region. Trains with numeric names are spelled out. For example, the 20th Century Limited is listed as "Twentieth Century Limited".

Named trains are sometimes identified through a train headboard, drumhead, lettering on the locomotive or passenger cars, or a combination of these methods.

== Africa ==
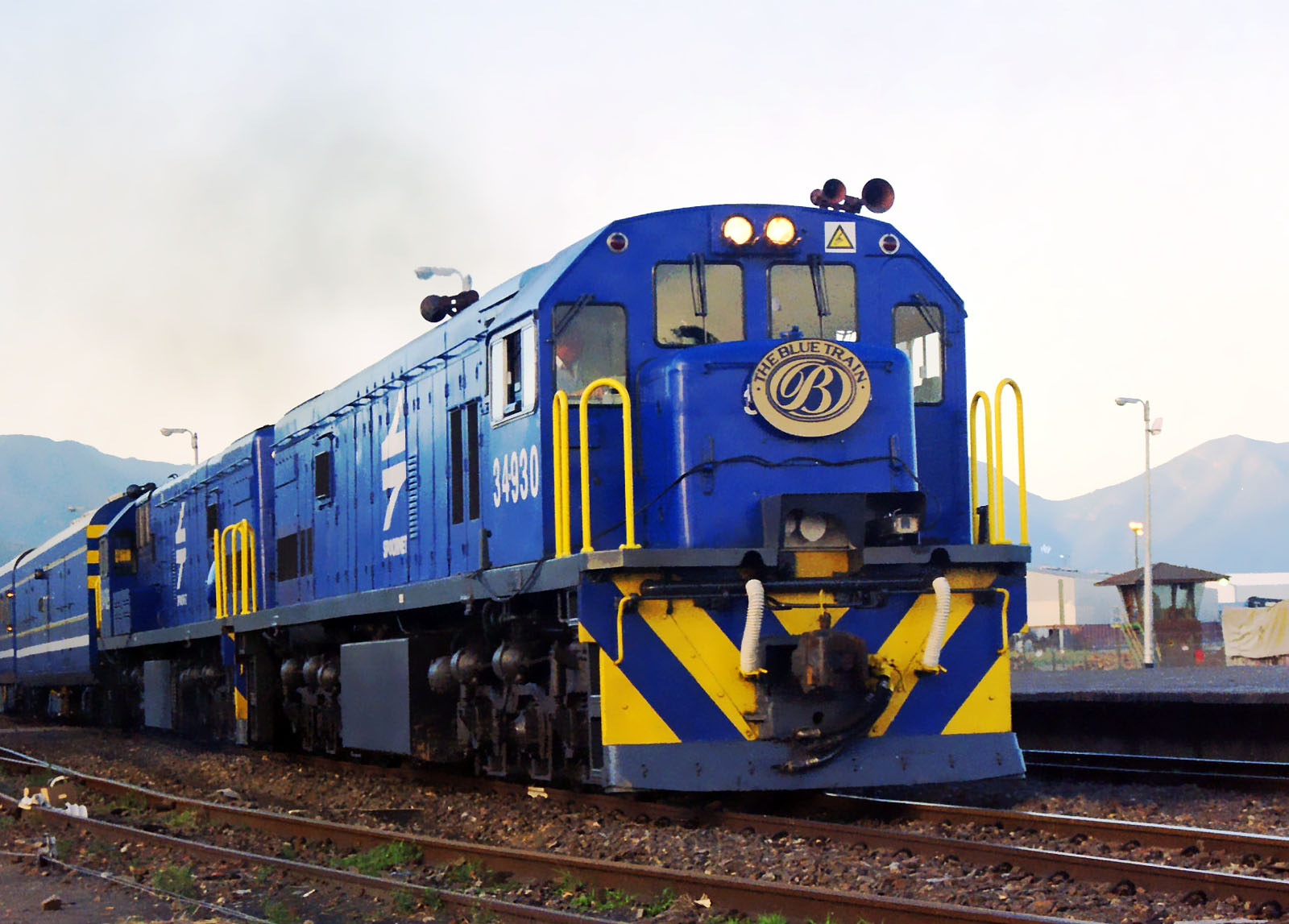
Transnet Class 34 GE, luxury passenger Blue Train (South Africa)

- List of named passenger trains of Africa

== Asia ==
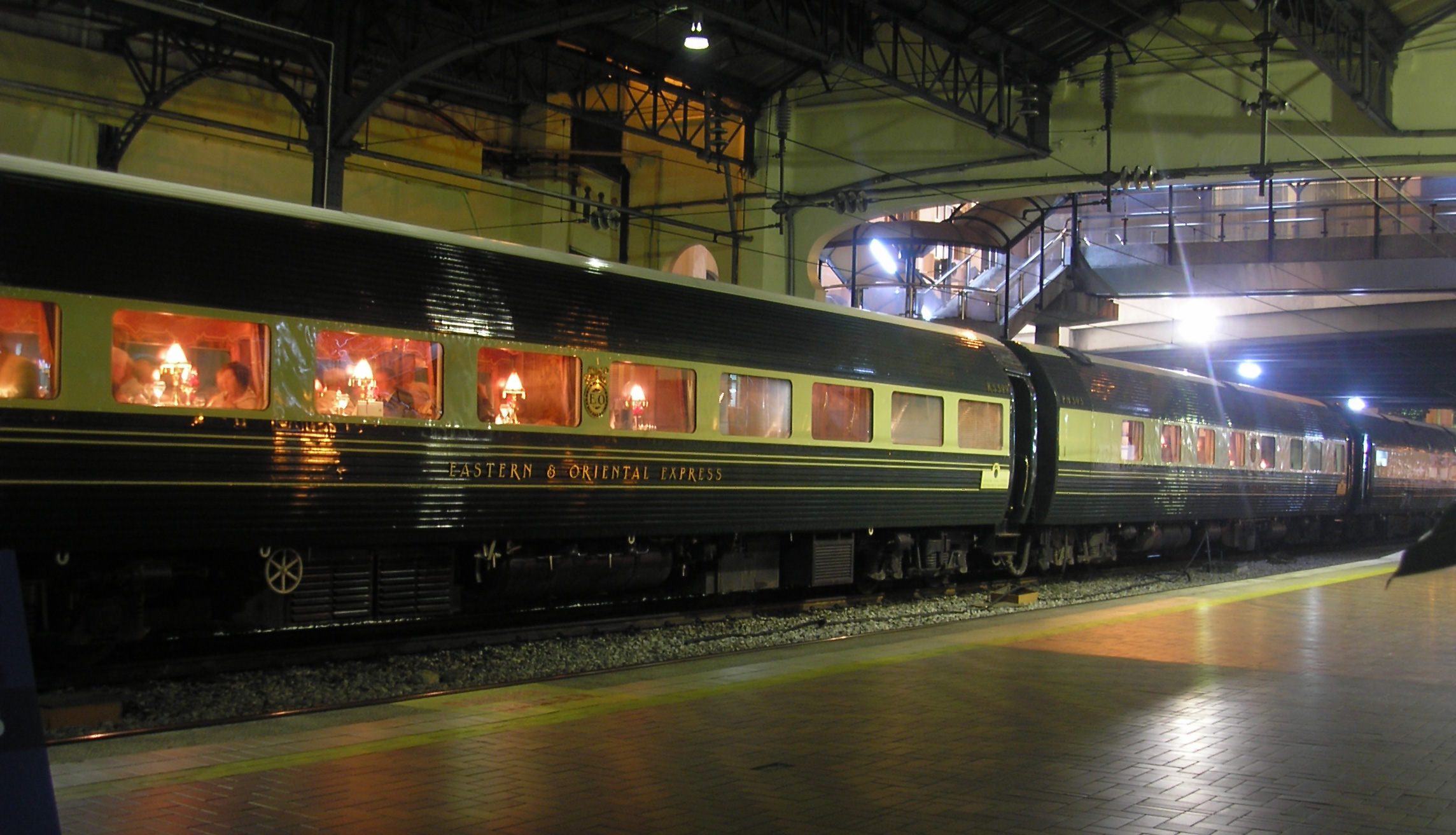
The Eastern & Oriental Express, a named passenger train between Thailand, Malaysia and Singapore.

- List of named passenger trains of Bangladesh
- List of named passenger trains of India
- List of named passenger trains of Indonesia
- List of named passenger trains of Japan
- List of named passenger trains of Pakistan
- List of named passenger trains of Russia
- List of named passenger trains of Sri Lanka
- List of named passenger trains of Southeast Asia

== Europe ==
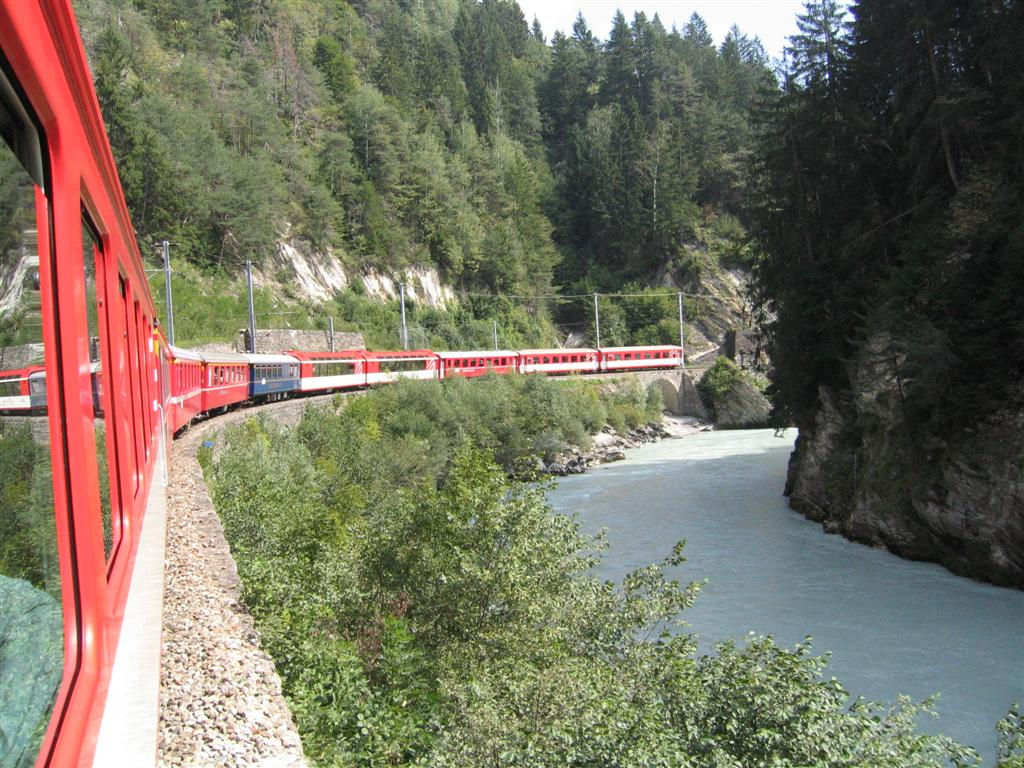
The Glacier Express, a named passenger train in Switzerland

- List of named passenger trains of Europe
- List of named passenger trains of Italy
- List of named passenger trains of Russia
- List of named passenger trains of Switzerland
- List of named passenger trains of the United Kingdom

== North America ==
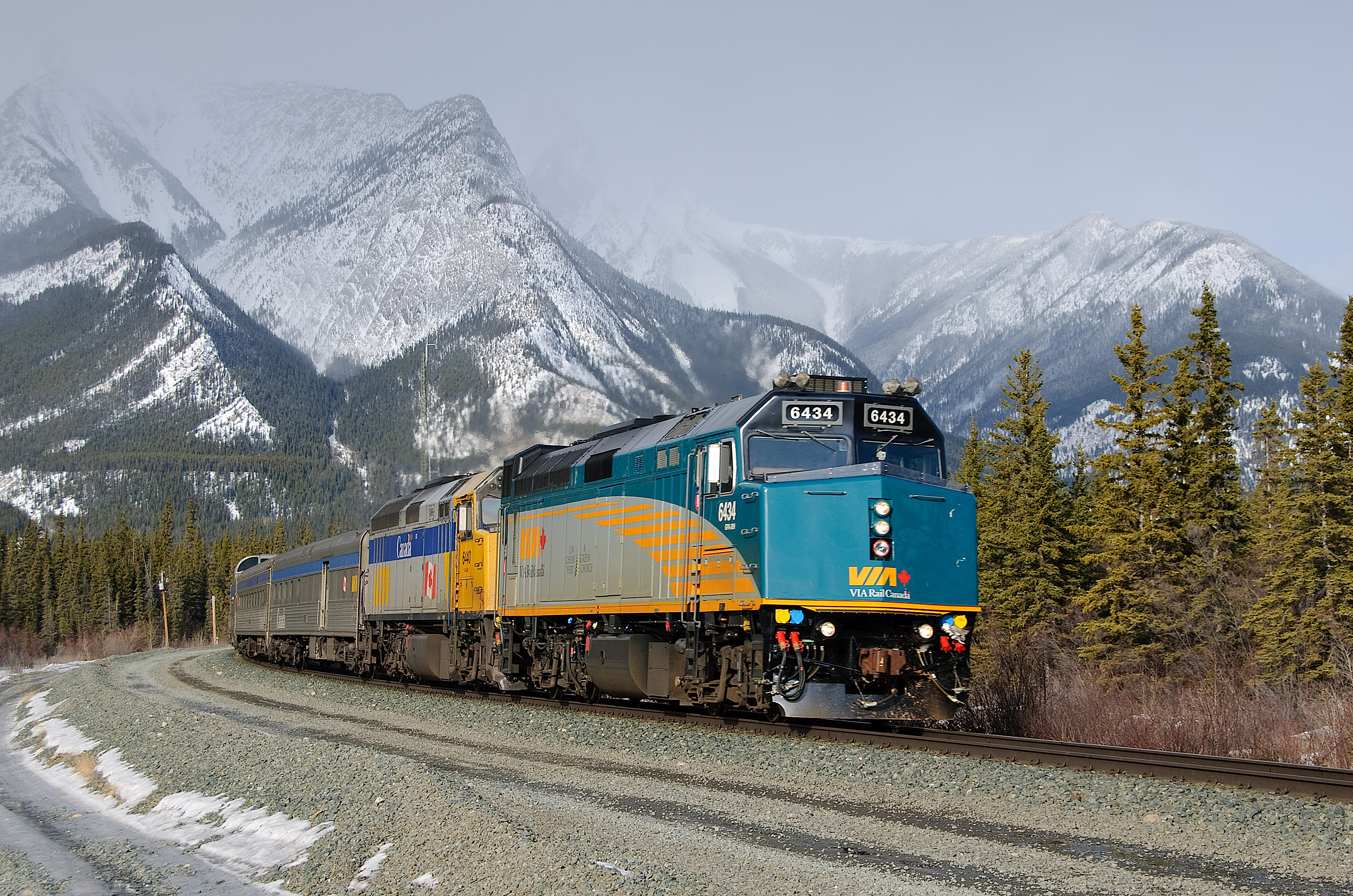
The Canadian, a named passenger train in Canada.

- List of named passenger trains of Canada
- List of named passenger trains of Mexico
- List of named passenger trains of the United States (A–B)
- List of named passenger trains of the United States (C)
- List of named passenger trains of the United States (D–H)
- List of named passenger trains of the United States (I–M)
- List of named passenger trains of the United States (N–R)
- List of named passenger trains of the United States (S–Z)

== Oceania ==
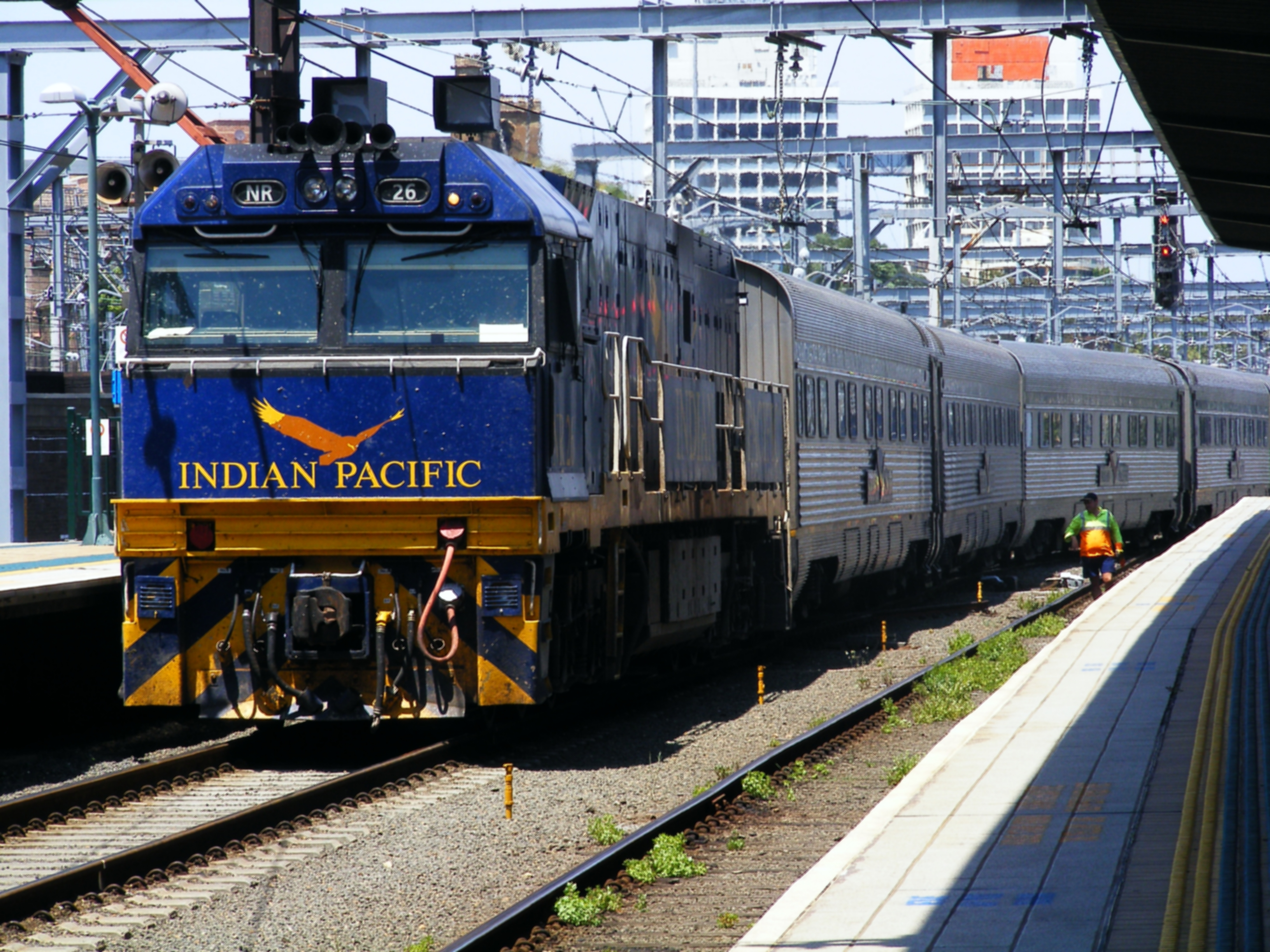
The Indian Pacific, a named passenger train in Australia.

- List of named passenger trains of Australia
- List of named passenger trains of New Zealand

== See also ==
- Freight train
- Land transport
- Maritime transport
- Public transport
- Passenger train
- Passenger railroad car
- Rail transport
- Road transport
