= Alpheus Beede Stickney =

American railroad executive

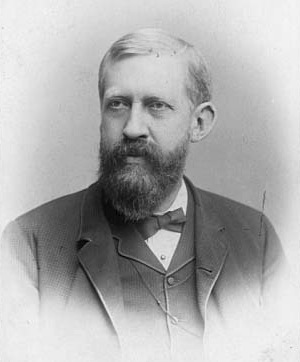
- Alpheus Beede Stickney, c. 1880.
- Born: June 27, 1840; Wilton, Maine
- Died: August 9, 1916 (aged 76); St. Paul, Minnesota

Alpheus Beede "A.B." Stickney (June 27, 1840 – August 9, 1916) was the first president of the Chicago Great Western Railway, from 1884 to 1909.

== Youth and education ==
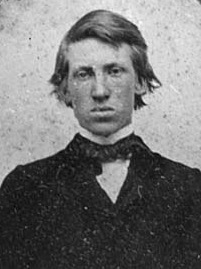
Alpheus Beede Stickney, c. 1860.

Alpheus Beede Stickney was born in Wilton, Maine, on June 27, 1840, the first son of Daniel Stickney and his third wife, Ursula Maria Beede.

== Railroad career ==
Stickney was a personal and professional friend of James J. Hill, a pioneering railroad magnate, who became known in his lifetime as "The Empire Builder". Stickney worked for him and he had a hand in Stickney's later railroads. Stickney in 1879 had been the construction superintendent for St. Paul, Minneapolis & Manitoba Railway, later known as the Great Northern Railway. James J. Hill in 1881 sent Stickney to be construction superintendent for the Canadian Pacific Railway. In 1885 he started what would become the Chicago Great Western Railway, which linked Chicago, Minneapolis, Omaha, and Kansas City. Clearing Yard in Chicago was founded by him in 1889.

Stickney was a maverick among railroad executives of the time. He favored some regulation by the federal government and was opposed to the most flagrant abuses of the railroads. His viewpoint is well illustrated by the following quotation:

"The managing officers were now potentates,--'railroad magnates,' 'railroad kings.' They traveled in state, surrounded by their personal staff, the heads of the different departments, who were almost as important personages as their chiefs. When they visited a town on their lines, the principal business men rushed to greet them. The fat of the land was at their disposal. Merchants sent baskets of champagne to the heads of the traffic departments and sealskin jackets to their wives, while on the other hand, special rates were liberally bestowed upon their favorites. Special clerks were required to be wholly employed in issuing free passes. Judges and juries seemed to have a perceptible bias in their favor, the brightest attorneys were retained, and minor officials were glad to grant them favors. The country press was subsidized with passes for editors, their families and their friends."

== Legacy ==
Stickney died on August 9, 1916, and is buried in Oakland Cemetery, St. Paul, Minnesota.

The village of Stickney, Illinois, a suburb of Chicago just south of Berwyn and Cicero, is named after him.

Preceded by	President of Chicago Great Western Railway and predecessors 1884 – 1909	Succeeded by Samuel Morse Felton, Jr.
