= Winston Tunnel =

Railroad tunnel in Illinois

- Interactive map of Winston Tunnel

Overview
- Line: Chicago Great Western Railway
- Location: Jo Daviess County, 9 miles (14 km) west of Elizabeth, IL
- Coordinates: 42°20′05″N 90°21′50″W
- Status: Abandoned and closed

Operation
- Opened: 1888
- Closed: 1972

Technical
- Line length: 2,493 feet (760 m)
- Max elevation: 797 feet (243 m) above sea level
- Tunnel clearance: 18.5 feet (5.6 m)
- Grade: 0.92% (rising east)

The Winston Tunnel is a railroad tunnel located 9 miles (14.5 kilometers) west of Elizabeth, Illinois.

The tunnel was completed in 1888 for the Minnesota and Northwestern Railroad, a predecessor to the Chicago Great Western Railway (CGW). The tunnel was located on the CGW main line 152 miles (245 kilometers) west of Chicago in the isolated and hilly Driftless Area of extreme north-western Illinois.

In 1972, four years after the Chicago Great Western was merged into the Chicago and North Western Railway (C&NW), the CGW's largely redundant trackage in the area, including the Winston Tunnel, was abandoned. It was the third longest railroad tunnel in Illinois at 2,493 feet (760 m). Two longer (still active) tunnels are located on the Canadian National (ex-Illinois Central) Edgewood Cutoff Line, the longest being Tunnel #2 near Abbot, Illinois which is 6,994 feet (2,132 m) long.

== History ==
The newly constructed Minnesota and Northwestern Railroad across northern Illinois used trackage rights on the Illinois Central Railroad between Dubuque, Iowa and Stockton, Illinois in 1886 before construction on its own line through the isolated wilderness could commence. Engineers quickly realized that a tunnel would need to be constructed in order to traverse the rugged landscape. The Sheppard, Winston and Company (for which the tunnel would be named) and more than 350 laborers worked by hand, digging through the silty and unstable shale for nine months starting in the spring of 1887. The work was both strenuous and dangerous, and at least one worker, a thirty-two-year-old Finnish immigrant named John Hill, was killed. When complete, the total cost of the tunnel, $600,000, had exceeded expectations.

The tunnel proved to be a constant nuisance to the Chicago Great Western and its predecessors. Almost immediately, railroad engineers realized that the unstable nature of shale through which the tunnel was bored, ground water seepage, and the isolated location of the tunnel meant repairs would be frequent and costly. The tunnel was originally braced by wooden beams when it opened to rail traffic in January 1888, but these eventually proved inadequate, and were replaced in 1902 by brick and reinforced concrete. Constant deterioration of the supports meant that large-scale reconstruction of the tunnel was needed in 1912, 1918, 1944 and 1947.

The bore was also improperly ventilated at first. A shaft sunk into the top of the tunnel failed to provide enough fresh air, and the crews of the steam engines would often complain of the intense heat and smoke due to the poor air circulation. Piecemeal solutions failed to work, and by 1912 the railroad was forced to install a huge fan, powered by a 310 horsepower (230 kW) diesel motor and staffed by operators day and night, to ventilate the tunnel. The fanhouse, constructed by 1916, was abandoned by the CGW with the acquisition of diesel locomotives by 1947. An additional safety feature was a white spotlight which would illuminate for westbound trains any obstacles in the tunnel.

When the Chicago Great Western was federalized during World War I, a contingent of Illinois National Guardsmen were assigned to protect the tunnel.

The operating nightmares of the tunnel, not to mention the millions of dollars the CGW spent to keep it open, forced the railroad's management to consider many schemes to rid themselves of the burden. In 1909, 1951 and again in 1964 (the same year the North Western and Great Western announced their intentions to merge) the CGW sought engineering proposals to reroute their trackage around the bore, to daylight the tunnel, or to completely rebuild and improve it. To the often cash-strapped Great Western, however, all these plans proved far too expensive.

In the end, the 1968 merger with the Chicago and North Western (C&NW) sealed the Winston Tunnel's fate. The Great Western's main line through northern Illinois closely paralleled the North Western's own line, but through less densely populated and less commercially active areas. The steep grades of the line and the obvious financial burden of the Winston Tunnel also played a role in the decision to completely abandon the Great Western's trackage in the area. The C&NW operated its last train through the tunnel in 1971. Scrappers pulled up the tracks the following year. Upon abandonment, the C&NW placed chain-link fences over each bore of the tunnel to keep squatters and other trespassers out. A 1973 attempt to turn the right-of-way through Jo Daviess County, including the Winston Tunnel, into a rail trail, failed when ownership of the land reverted to nearby property owners.

== Present day ==
The Winston Tunnel still exists in a very deteriorated condition. Nature has reclaimed the right-of-way; the fan house, unused since the 1940s and damaged by the elements, was demolished in early 2007, and the eastern bore, located on private property, has been almost completely sealed with earth.

The western half was purchased by the Illinois Department of Natural Resources as a "satellite area" of Apple River Canyon State Park. The DNR installed a new steel gate to replace the chain-link fence covering the western bore, and is developing the area with nature trails and other improvements. The tunnel is off-limits to public visitation as it is unsafe, due both to rattlesnakes and the ever-present danger of further collapse.
