= Bankers (train) =

Overview
- Service type: Inter-city rail
- Status: Discontinued
- Locale: Northeastern United States
- First service: 1939
- Last service: 1971
- Former operator(s): New York, New Haven and Hartford Railroad; Amtrak

Route
- Termini: Springfield, Massachusetts; Grand Central Terminal, New York City
- Distance travelled: 134.5 miles (216.5 km)
- Service frequency: Daily
- Train number(s): 67

On-board services
- Seating arrangements: Coaches
- Catering facilities: Grill car (1955)
- Observation facilities: Parlor car

Technical
- Track gauge: 4 ft 8 1/2 in (1,435 mm)

The Bankers was a passenger train operated by the New York, New Haven and Hartford Railroad between Grand Central Terminal, New York City and Springfield, Massachusetts. Under the New Haven the Bankers provided early morning express service from Springfield to New York, running non-stop from New Haven, Connecticut. The Bankers was paired with the Nathan Hale, which ran an hour later. In the afternoon the train returned as the Connecticut Yankee. The Bankers carried parlor cars, a grill (dining) car and coaches.

The Bankers ran as number 67 on the New Haven but would be discontinued under the Penn Central, although New York-New Haven-Springfield service remained. Amtrak revived the name in 1975, and it remained in use until individual names disappeared from the Northeast Corridor schedule with the introduction of the NortheastDirect brand.
