= Aiken-Augusta Special =

Former American train route

Overview
- Service type: Inter-city rail
- Status: Discontinued
- Locale: Southeastern United States
- First service: October 24, 1915
- Last service: October 22, 1966
- Former operators: Pennsylvania Railroad; Southern Railway (U.S.)

Route
- Termini: New York, New York; Augusta, Georgia; and secondary route to Aiken, South Carolina
- Distance travelled: 795.4 miles (1,280.1 km) (New York-Augusta, 1952)
- Service frequency: Daily
- Train numbers: 31 (southbound) and 32 (northbound)

On-board services
- Seating arrangements: Reclining seat coach
- Sleeping arrangements: Sections, roomettes, single bedrooms, double bedrooms, drawing room, compartments
- Catering facilities: Diner

Technical
- Track gauge: 4 ft 8 1/2 in (1,435 mm)

The Aiken-Augusta Special was a named night train of the Southern Railway between New York City and Augusta, Georgia. Different from other long distance Southern Railway lines which tended to briefly go through the northwestern edge of South Carolina, this route went through the interior of the state. Its route marked the last directly north-south route between Charlotte, North Carolina, and Columbia, South Carolina, and it marked one of the last long distance trains into Augusta, Georgia.

== History ==
The train began as the Augusta Special on October 24, 1915. Beginning in 1928 the train had a section that split from the main route at Trenton, South Carolina, and went to Aiken, South Carolina, and so the train took the name, Aiken-Augusta Special. The train was carried over Pennsylvania Railroad tracks from New York City to Washington, D.C., and in an unusual arrangement the coach cars were on a different train (No. 153 the Congressional southbound; No. 112 unnamed, northbound) from the sleeping cars between New York and Washington, and upon reaching the latter city the itinerary became merged.

With dwindling traffic in the 1950s, the Aiken spur route was eliminated in 1953, and the train reverted to the Augusta Special. Beginning on June 29, 1956, the Augusta Special was combined with the Crescent north of Charlotte. In October 1966, the Augusta Special was cut back from both ends, running only between Warrenville and Fort Mill within South Carolina. That stub train ran until October 14, 1967.

=== Asheville Special ===
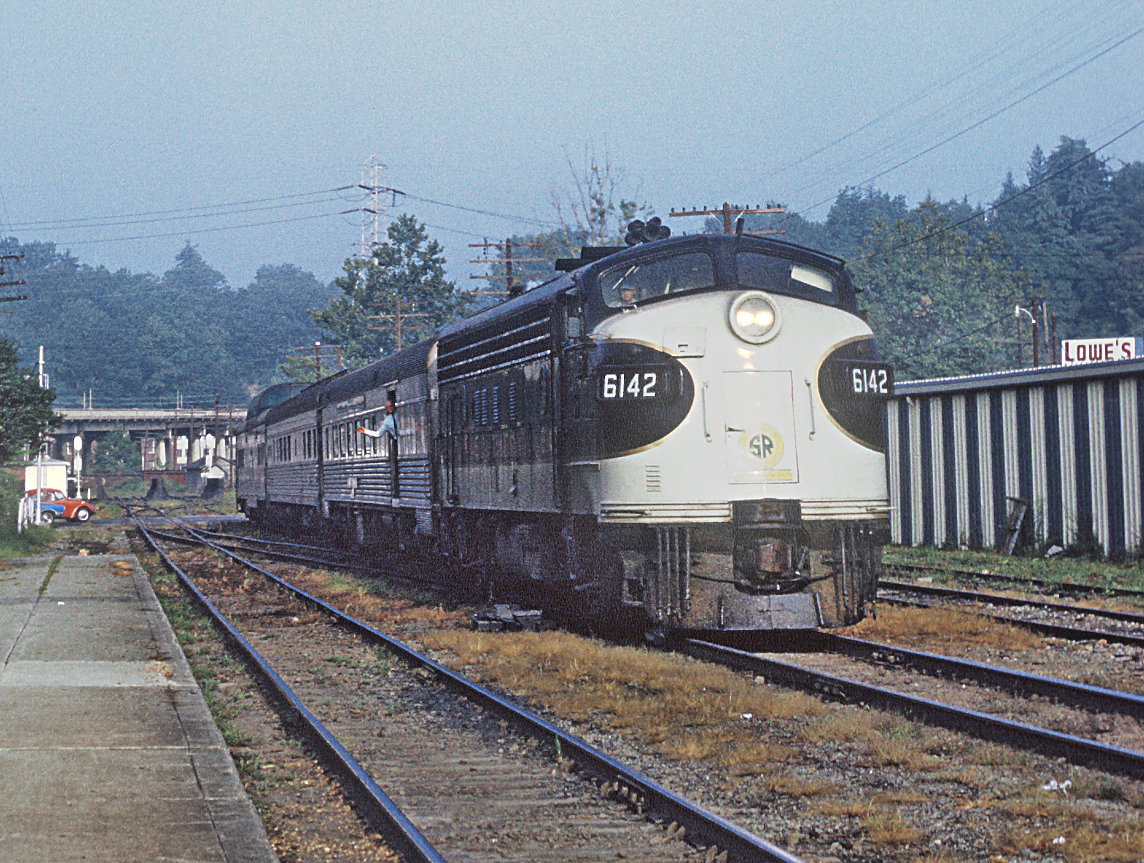
The Asheville Special at Biltmore in 1971

The train had the Asheville Special (#15 south/#16 north; begun in 1930), which split from the main route in Greensboro, North Carolina, (Salisbury until 1949) and continued west from Greensboro, to Winston-Salem and then to Asheville, North Carolina. Through sleeping cars ran between New York City and Asheville, but the coaches and diner only ran between Asheville and Greensboro. The southbound Asheville sleeper shifted to the Southerner in 1955, though coach passengers continued to use the Augusta Limited.

After the Augusta Limited was cut in 1966, the Asheville Special continued to be combined with the Southerner southbound and the Crescent northbound. It lost its name on February 1, 1970, and its through sleeper on February 15. On July 22, 1970, it was truncated to a tri-weekly Asheville-Salisbury train, which connected with the Piedmont at Salisbury. It was finally discontinued on August 8, 1975.

== Major stations ==
- New York, New York
- Newark, New Jersey
- North Philadelphia, Pennsylvania
- Philadelphia
- Wilmington, Delaware
- Baltimore, Maryland
- Washington, D.C.
- Charlottesville, Virginia
- Lynchburg
- Danville
- Greensboro, North Carolina
- High Point
- Concord
- Charlotte
- Rock Hill, South Carolina
- Columbia
- Augusta, Georgia
