= Trans Karoo Express =

Defunct South African train service

The Trans Karoo Express, or simply Trans Karoo, was a South African express passenger train service which travelled an approximately 1,600-kilometre (990 mi) journey between Johannesburg and Cape Town. It operated daily in each direction, meaning that there were in fact two Trans Karoos - they passed each other during the night, heading in opposite directions. The service was operated by Spoornet, the national railway company.

The Trans Karoo was named from the Great Karoo scrubland, one of the most extensive geographical features of southern Africa, across which the train operated. The route was identical to that operated by the Blue Train. However, the Blue Train is an exclusively 1st-class luxury service, on which a considerable premium is payable. The Trans Karoo conveyed 3rd class, 2nd class, and 'ordinary' 1st class passengers. Those travelling 1st class on the Trans Karoo had private sleeping compartments (converted to seating accommodation during the day) with washing facilities, plus shared showers and lavatories in each carriage. There was also a dining and lounge car on the train, where meals could be taken in comfort. The lounge car was only for the use of 1st class passengers, while both 1st and 2nd class passengers could take meals in the dining car. 2nd class was similar to 1st class, sleeping 6 passengers in each compartment and 3 in each couple, where 1st class slept 4 and 2 respectively. Early and mid steel bodied 2nd class carriages had no shower facilities, however subsequent generations of 2nd class carriages introduced in the 1980s did. 3rd class slept 6 per compartment in rather spartan conditions, with minimal padding on the seats and bunks, and while each 1st and 2nd class compartment had two windows, 3rd class compartments only had one. Coupes in all three classes had a single window. Heating in the carriages was provided by steam radiators, so in the winter months Vapor Clarkson steam generator wagons would be coupled between the locomotives and the rest of the train on the sections where the motive power was diesel or electric.

After anti-apartheid sanctions were lifted in 1990, South Africa became a popular destination for railfans as Spoornet was still using many steam locomotives. In 1991, Spoornet began to operate the Trans Karoo Express with steam for part of its journey. A pair of 25NC class locomotives hauled the train between Johannesburg and Klerksdorp on Saturdays, returning on Sundays. This ended in March 1997.

The service is now incorporated into the Shosholoza Meyl network of operations, a sub-division of the national passenger train operator, the Passenger Rail Agency of South Africa. Although the title of Trans Karoo has officially ended, it is still used colloquially to refer to the Johannesburg to Cape Town section of Shosholoza Meyl operations, where the trains still operate exactly the same route as the old Trans Karoo, and to the same timetable. Shosholoza Meyl has introduced refurbished railway coaches, although these have attracted criticism from tourists as even though the windows are physically the same size as the original windows, only the top half now opens and only pivots inwards for a short distance. The original windows slid downwards into the side of the carriage, and opened fully, allowing passengers a much better view of the passing countryside.
