= Minnesotan =

Overview
- Service type: Inter-city rail
- Status: Discontinued
- Locale: Illinois, Iowa, Minnesota
- Predecessor: Great Western Limited
- First service: January 16, 1925 (as Legionnaire); 1930 (as Minnesotan)
- Last service: May 10, 1949 (as Minnesotan); August 11, 1956 (as numbered train)
- Former operator: Chicago Great Western Railway

Route
- Termini: Chicago, Illinois; Minneapolis or Rochester, Minnesota
- Distance travelled: 359 mi (578 km) (Chicago–Rochester); 435 mi (700 km) (Chicago–Minneapolis)
- Average journey time: 12h25m
- Service frequency: Daily
- Train numbers: 1 (Chicago–Minneapolis), 2 (Minneapolis–Chicago)

Technical
- Track gauge: 4 ft 8 1/2 in (1,435 mm)

The Minnesotan was an overnight passenger train run by the Chicago Great Western Railway, using the CGW's trackage between Grand Central Station in Chicago, Illinois, and Saint Paul Union Depot in Saint Paul, Minnesota, via Hayfield, Minnesota. A section of the train split in McIntire, Iowa, to serve Rochester, Minnesota.

Begun as the Legionnaire in 1925, the train was renamed the Minnesotan in 1930, and was powered by a 4-6-2 Pacific-type locomotive. The Minnesotan was one of the finest passenger trains the Great Western operated but could not compete against the more famous passenger trains of the Milwaukee Road and the Chicago and North Western, which both had more direct routes.

The Great Western dropped the name on May 10, 1949, but Chicago to St. Paul passenger service continued to linger on for seven more years. By the early 1950s, a doodlebug or (later) a single EMD F-unit pulled a railway post office car, a baggage car, and a coach. This service was spartan compared to the Minnesotan of less than a decade earlier, and ceased entirely on August 11, 1956.
