= Marquette (Milwaukee Road train) =

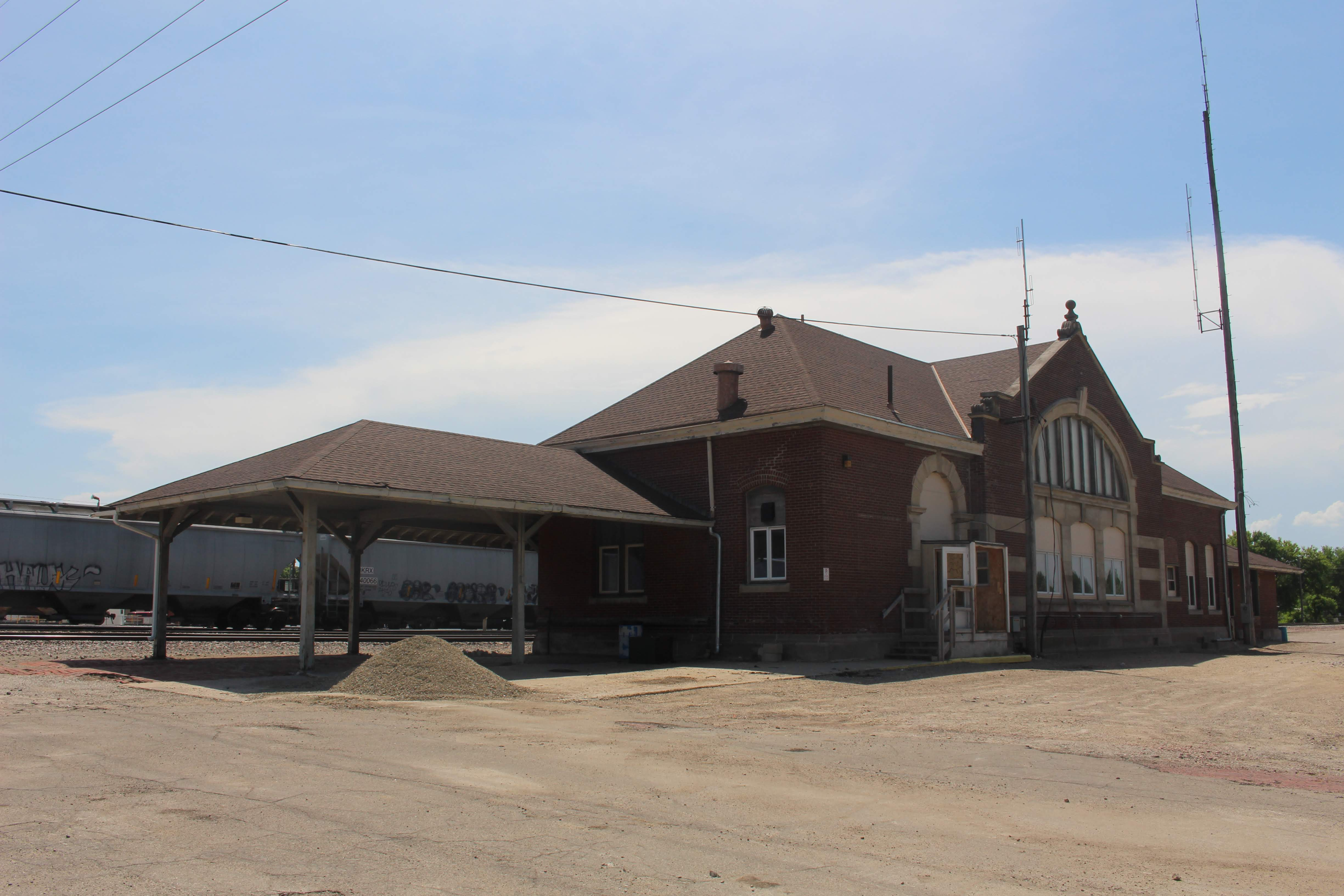
- The former terminus at Mason City, Iowa in 2018

Overview
- First service: 1937
- Last service: January 13, 1951
- Former operator: Milwaukee Road

Route
- Termini: Chicago, Illinois; Mason City, Iowa
- Distance travelled: 356 miles (573 km)
- Service frequency: Daily
- Train numbers: 3 (westbound), 18 (eastbound)

The Marquette was a passenger train operated by the Chicago, Milwaukee, St. Paul and Pacific Railroad ("Milwaukee Road") between Chicago and Mason City, Iowa. Service began in 1937, and was discontinued January 14, 1951. Despite the elimination of the Marquette, the line continued to see service by the Sioux until 1960, when that service was cut back to Madison, Wisconsin.
