= Chicago Great Western Railway =

Railroad that linked Chicago, Minneapolis, Omaha, and Kansas City

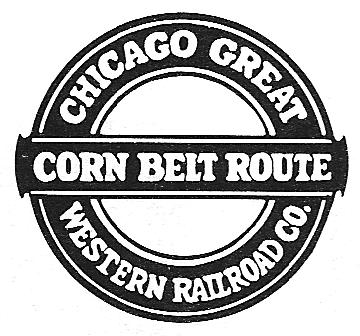

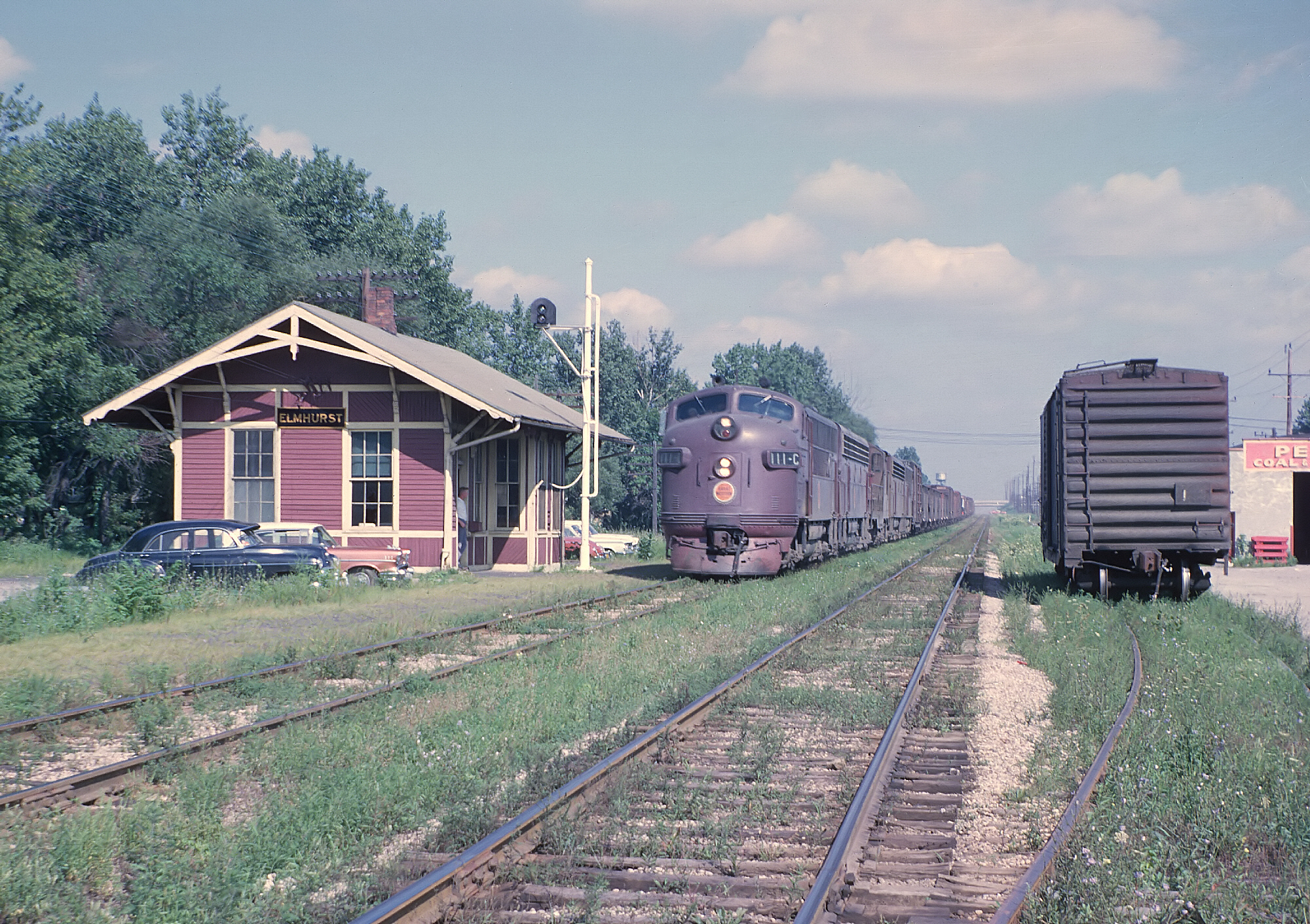
- A CGW freight train passing Elmhurst, Illinois from just east of York Street in 1962

Overview
- Headquarters: Oelwein, Iowa / Chicago, Illinois
- Reporting mark: CGW
- Locale: Minneapolis, Minnesota, Oelwein, Iowa, Chicago, Illinois, Kansas City, Kansas and Omaha, Nebraska
- Dates of operation: 1885–1968
- Successor: Chicago and North Western

Technical
- Track gauge: 4 ft 8 1/2 in (1,435 mm)

The Chicago Great Western Railway (reporting mark CGW) was a Class I railroad that linked Chicago, Minneapolis, Omaha, and Kansas City. It was founded by Alpheus Beede Stickney in 1885 as a regional line between St. Paul and the Iowa state line called the Minnesota and Northwestern Railroad. Through mergers and new construction, the railroad, named Chicago Great Western after 1892, quickly became a multi-state carrier. One of the last Class I railroads to be built, it competed against several other more well-established railroads in the same territory, and developed a corporate culture of innovation and efficiency to survive.

Nicknamed the Corn Belt Route because of its operating area in the midwestern United States, the railroad was sometimes called the Lucky Strike Road, due to the similarity in design between the herald of the CGW and the logo used for Lucky Strike cigarettes.

In 1968 it merged with the Chicago and North Western Railway (CNW), which abandoned most of the CGW's trackage.

== History ==
=== Predecessor railroads ===
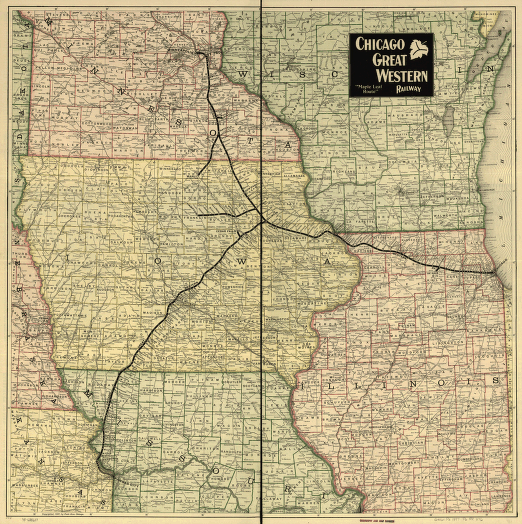
The Chicago Great Western, circa 1897.

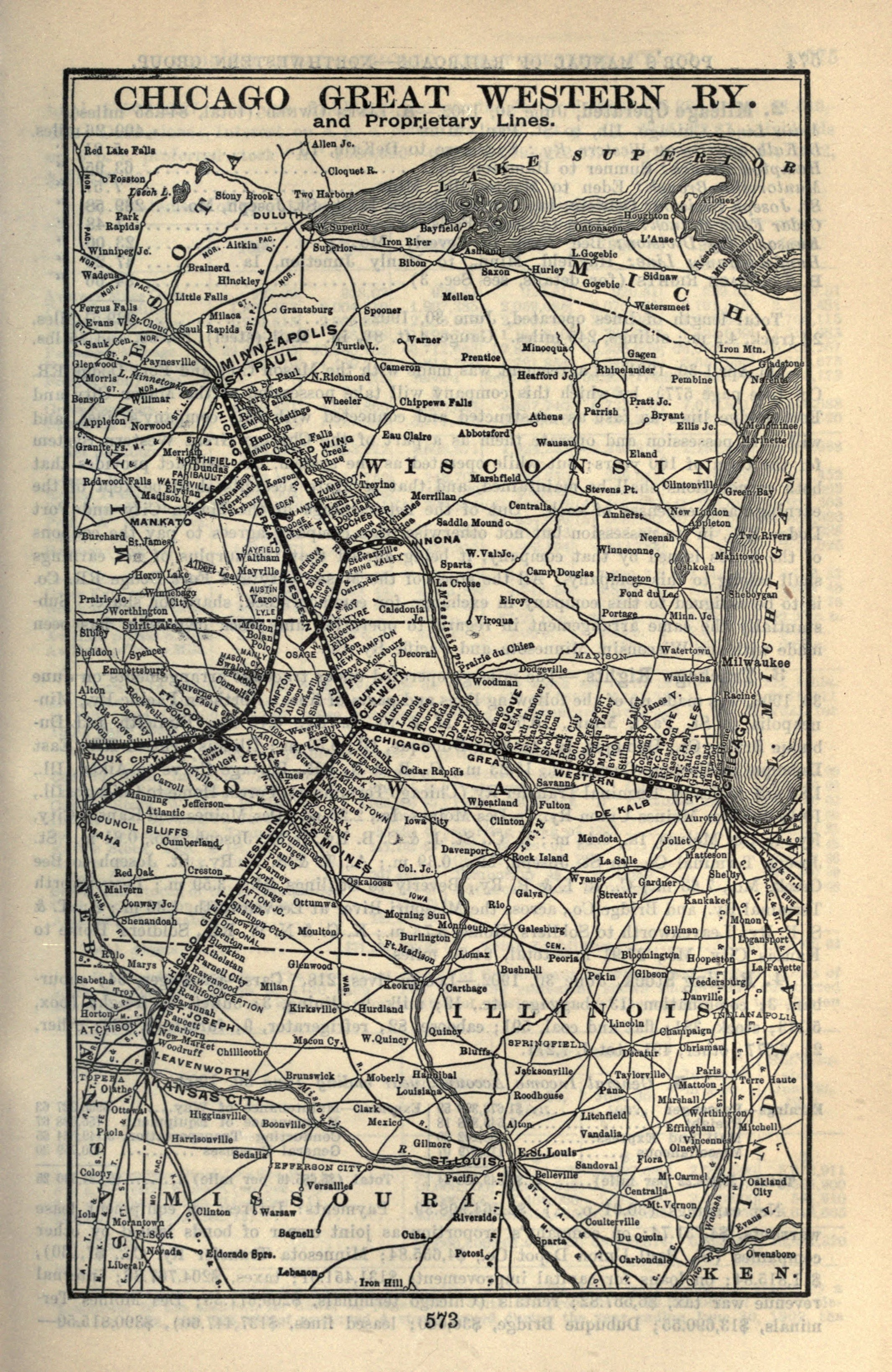
Railway in 1903, following completion of lines in Iowa to Sioux City and Omaha, Nebraska, and branch lines in Minnesota

In 1835, the Chicago, St. Charles & Mississippi Airline railroad was chartered with the intent of building a railroad west out of Chicago. The railroad never began construction, and its rights to build were transferred in 1854 to a new company, the Minnesota & North Western (M&NW), which eventually began construction in 1884 of a line south from St. Paul, Minnesota to Dubuque, Iowa. In 1887, the Chicago, St. Paul & Kansas City Railroad acquired the M&NW, and by the end of the decade, under the leadership of St. Paul businessman A.B. Stickney, it had established routes west to Omaha, Nebraska, south to St. Joseph, Missouri, and east to Chicago, Illinois, via the Winston Tunnel near Dubuque. In 1892, the railroad was reorganized as the Chicago Great Western.

During the construction period, mogul locomotives (2-6-0 wheel arrangement), which were large engines for the time, were used. They could pull 25-30 cars (of 40,000 pounds capacity), which was a long train for the time. These and all the railroad's other engines had red stacks, so the railroad became known as the "Red Stack Line."

The Chicago Great Western was not the only railroad with a red smokestack on its engines. In the 19th century, typically engine crews were assigned to specific engines, and one of the fireman's duties was to keep the stack and smokebox (which got quite hot) painted. Some of them customized their engines with red paint on the stacks, and some railroad shops painted stacks red, but so far as is known, the Chicago Great Western was the only American railroad to paint all of its engines' stacks red.

=== Early 20th century ===
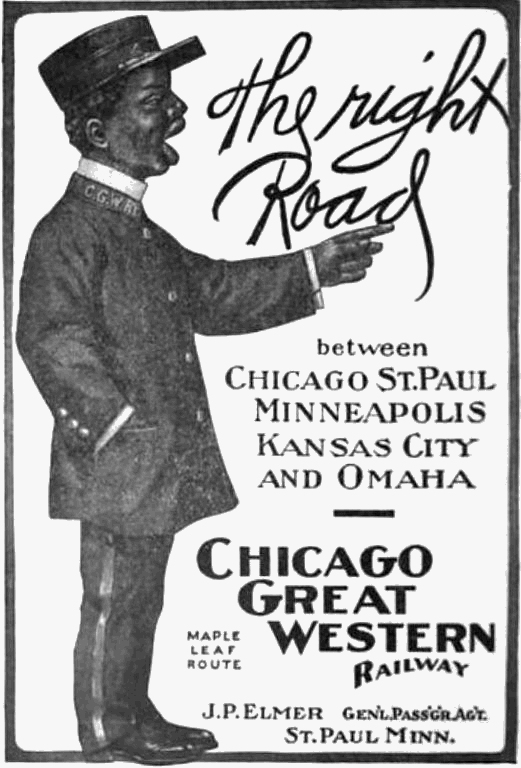
1907 Chicago Great Western ad.

The first repair shops for locomotives and freight cars were built at the original terminus in St. Paul, Minnesota, known as the South Park Shops. In 1892 the city of Oelwein, Iowa was chosen as the headquarters and primary shop site due to its central location on the mainline. Construction was completed in 1899, and soon Oelwein became known as "Shop City" for its mammoth shop site. The two-story combination machine, boiler, and coach shop alone measured 700 feet (213 meters) long and had 27 pits for overhauling locomotives.

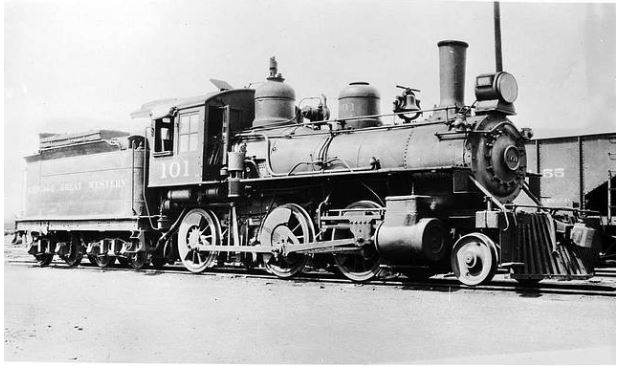
Chicago Great Western Engine #101, Mogul (2-6-0), built in 1888. The stack may have been red.

In 1907, the panic of 1907 caused Stickney to lose control of the railroad, and ownership passed to financier J. P. Morgan. In 1910, the CGW introduced four McKeen Motor Car Company self-propelled railcars, its first rolling stock powered by internal combustion engines. In the same year, the railroad also purchased ten large 2-6-6-2s from the Baldwin Locomotive Works. Two years later, the railroad acquired an experimental battery powered motorcar from the Federal Storage Battery Car Company. In 1916, the railroad began standardizing on 2-8-2 steam locomotives, which served through the 1920. In 1923 CGW purchased from the soon to be dominant company EMC, two of EMD's first gasoline-powered cars. During the 1920s, as ownership changed again to the Bremo Corporation, a group of investors led by Patrick Joyce, an executive at the Standard Steel Car Company, the railroad expanded its use of self-propelled vehicles. At the end of the decade, 36 2-10-4 steam locomotives were purchased from Baldwin and the Lima Locomotive Works.

=== Mid 20th century ===
During the Great Depression, the railroad trimmed operations by closing facilities and abandoning trackage. It purchased its first diesel-electric locomotive, an 800 horsepower (600 kW) yard switcher from Westinghouse, in 1934. In 1935, the CGW began trial operations of trailer on flatcar trains, which were expanded the following year into regular service, initially between Chicago and St. Paul, but rapidly expanding across the system by 1940. In 1941, it was reorganized in bankruptcy, and late in the decade a group of investors, organized as the Kansas City Group, purchased the CGW. In 1946, a demonstrator EMD F3 diesel locomotive set operated on the CGW, immediately prompting the company to purchase a wide variety of diesels, and by 1950 the railroad had converted completely to diesel motive power. In 1949, William N. Deramus III assumed the presidency, and began a program of rebuilding infrastructure and increasing efficiency, both by consolidating operations such as dispatching and accounting and by lengthening trains. In 1957, Deramus left the company, and Edward Reidy assumed the presidency.

=== Merger ===
As early as 1946, the first proposal was advanced to merge the Great Western with other railroads, this time with the Chicago and Eastern Illinois Railroad and the Missouri–Kansas–Texas Railroad. Upon the failure of a later merger opportunity with the Soo Line Railroad in 1963, the board of the Great Western grew increasingly anxious about its continued viability in a consolidating railroad market. Testifying in 1965, before the Interstate Commerce Commission in Chicago, President Reidy stated

that although it was operating in the black it would not be able to continue: The simple fact is that there is just too much transportation available between the principal cities we serve. The Great Western cannot long survive as an independent carrier under these conditions.

The CGW, therefore, was open to a merger with the Chicago and North Western Railway (CNW), first proposed in 1964. After a 4-year period of opposition by other competing railroads, on July 1, 1968, the Chicago Great Western merged with Chicago and North Western. At the time of the merger, the CGW operated a 1,411 miles (2,271 km) system, over which it transported 2,452 million ton-miles of freight in 1967, largely food and agricultural products, lumber, and chemicals, for $28.7 million of revenue. After taking control of the CGW, the CNW abandoned most of the former CGW trackage.

=== Trail conversion ===
A 20 mile section of the railroad right of way from Des Moines, IA south to Martensdale, IA was used to create a mixed use trail with the name of Great Western Trail. In addition, a section of track was converted to trail usage, also known as the Great Western Trail, running intermittently between Villa Park, Illinois and West Chicago, Illinois in DuPage County, and then through Kane and DeKalb counties to Sycamore, Illinois.

== Passenger operations ==
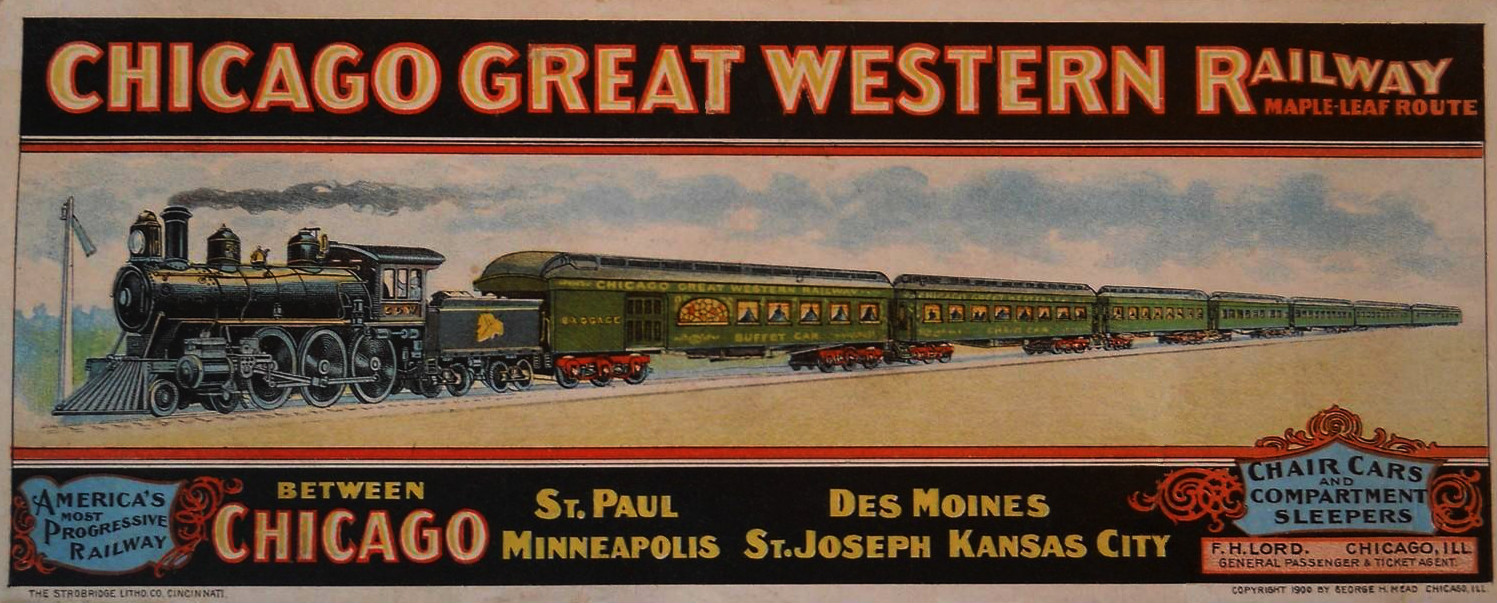
1906 blotter promoting the railroad's passenger service.

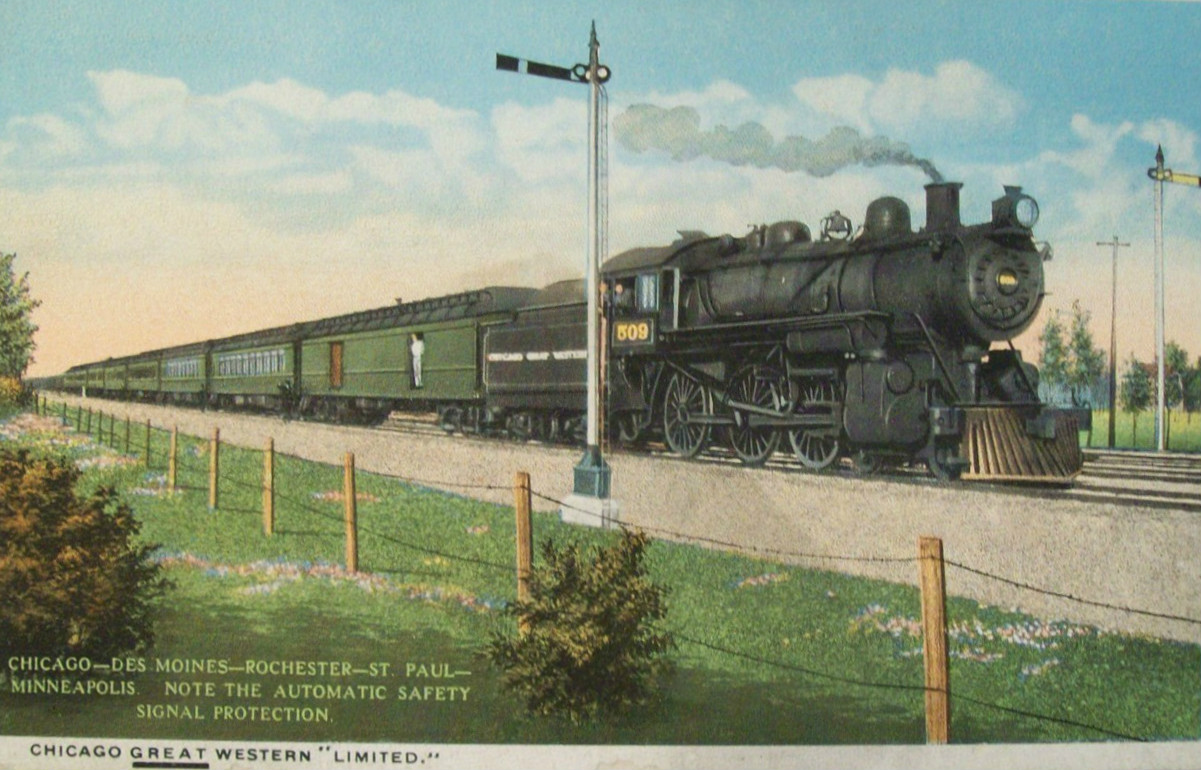
The Chicago Great Western Limited.

The Chicago Great Western was not known for its passenger trains, although it did operate several named trains, mostly running between Chicago and the Twin Cities. Despite the railroad's small size and meager passenger fleet, it looked for ways to more efficiently move passengers, such as employing all-electric (battery powered) and gas-electric motorcars on light branch lines, which were cheaper to operate than traditional steam or diesel-powered trains. Notable passenger trains from its major terminals included:

- Blue Bird (Minneapolis/St. Paul–Rochester)
- Great Western Limited (Chicago–Minneapolis/St. Paul)
- Rochester Special (Minneapolis/St. Paul–Rochester)
- Red Bird (Minneapolis/St. Paul–Rochester)
- Legionnaire (Chicago–Minneapolis/St. Paul)
- Minnesotan (Chicago–Minneapolis/St. Paul)
- Mills Cities Limited (Kansas City–Minneapolis/St. Paul)
- Nebraska Limited (Minneapolis/St. Paul-Omaha)
- Omaha Express (Minneapolis/St. Paul-Omaha)
- Twin City Express (Omaha-Minneapolis/St. Paul)
- Twin City Limited (Omaha-Minneapolis/St. Paul)
- Maple Leaf Route (Minneapolis/St. Paul, Rochester, Stewartville, Racine, Spring Valley MN etc. to Chicago IL)

On September 30, 1965, the railroad ended passenger operations when the overnight trains between the Twin Cities and Omaha arrived at their respective endpoints.

== See also ==
- Chicago and North Western Railway
- List of Illinois railroads
