= George R. Lawrence =

American photographer (1868–1938)

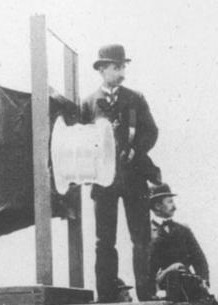
- Born: February 24, 1868; Ottawa, Illinois, US
- Died: December 15, 1938 (aged 70)
- Resting place: St. Joseph's Cemetery, Manteno, Illinois, US; 41.2515°N 87.8201°W
- Occupation: Photographer

George Raymond Lawrence (February 24, 1868 – December 15, 1938) was an American photographer. After years of experience building kites and balloons for aerial panoramic photography, Lawrence turned to aviation design in 1910.

== Early life ==
The Lawrences are descended from 18th-century German immigrants. He was born on February 24, 1868, in Ottawa, Illinois. He was the eldest of six children of Margaret Othelia Tritley and Michael B. Lawrence. The family later moved to Kankakee County.

== Career ==
Around 1890, he moved to Chicago and began working at the Abbott Buggy Co. factory in Auburn, Illinois. In 1890, Lawrence married Alice Herenden, with whom they had two children. In 1891, he opened The Lawrence Portrait Studio at the corner of Yale Avenue and 63rd Street.

In the mid-1890s, Lawrence perfected the use of "flashlight photography", which was the norm until flashbulbs were invented years later. In 1900, he built the world's largest camera to take a photograph of the Alton Limited Train, owned by the Chicago & Alton Railway. The camera weighed 1400 pounds (640 kg) and used a 4.5′ × 8′ glass-plate negative. The photograph was taken for the 1900 Exposition Universelle (Paris Exposition of 1900) in Paris, France and won "The Grand Prize of the World". He also made innovations in areas of aerial photography such as ballooning and camera–carrying kites.

=== San Francisco photo ===
One of Lawrence's world-renowned photographs is of the ruins of San Francisco, California after the 1906 earthquake. It is a 160-degree panorama from a kite taken 2000 feet (600 m) in the air above the San Francisco Bay that showed the entire city on a single 17-by-48-inch contact print made from a single piece of film. Each print sold for $125 and Lawrence made at least $15,000 (US$ 537,500 in 2025) in sales from this one photograph. The camera used in this photograph weighed 49 pounds (22 kg) and used a celluloid-film plate.

In 2006, Juneau-based photographer Ronald Klein built a working replica of Lawrence's camera and used it to rephotograph San Francisco from about the same location (but from a helicopter, not a kite), 100 years after the earthquake. The rephotograph was actually taken by Mark Walsh, George R. Lawrence's great grandson, who rode in the helicopter, held the camera, and clicked the shutter.

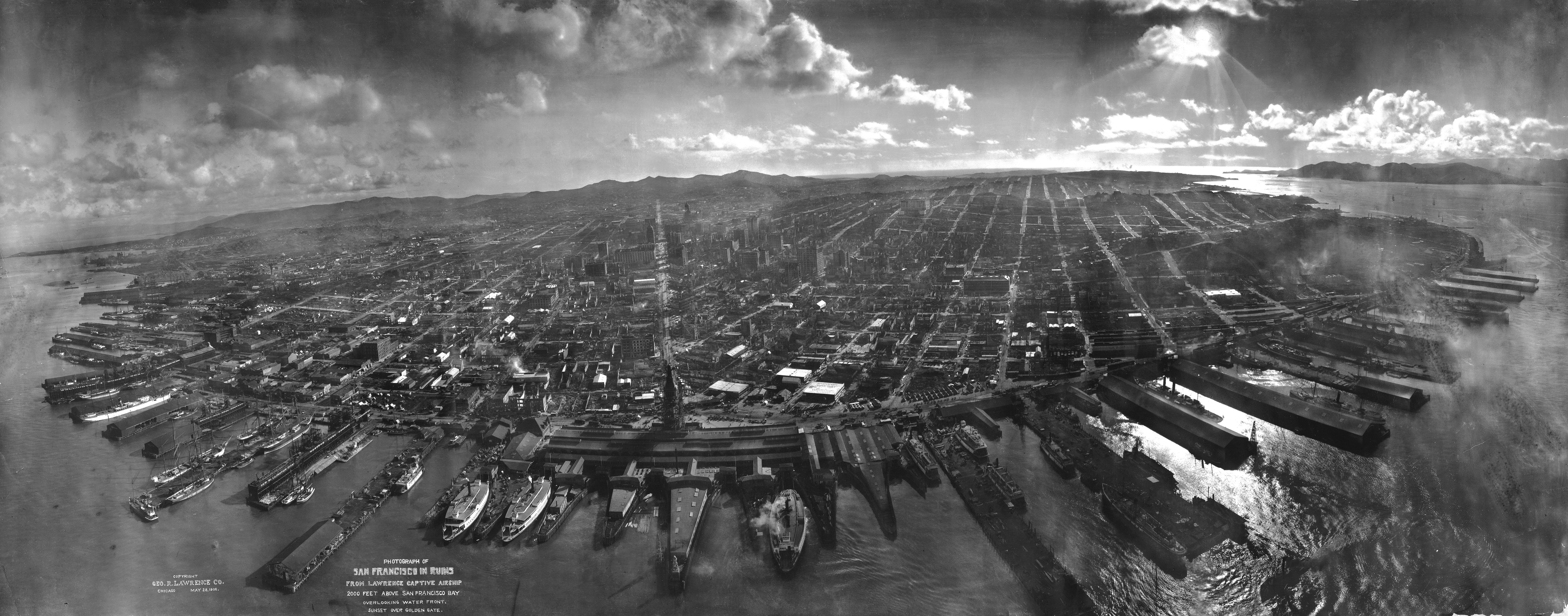
San Francisco in ruins, waterfront in foreground, with sunset over Golden Gate in background, looking from 2,000 feet (610 m) above San Francisco Bay, by George R. Lawrence using Kite aerial photography, copyright 28 May 1906. Market Street leads directly away from Ferry Building tower, center foreground, towards Twin Peaks, center-left background.

== Personal life and death ==
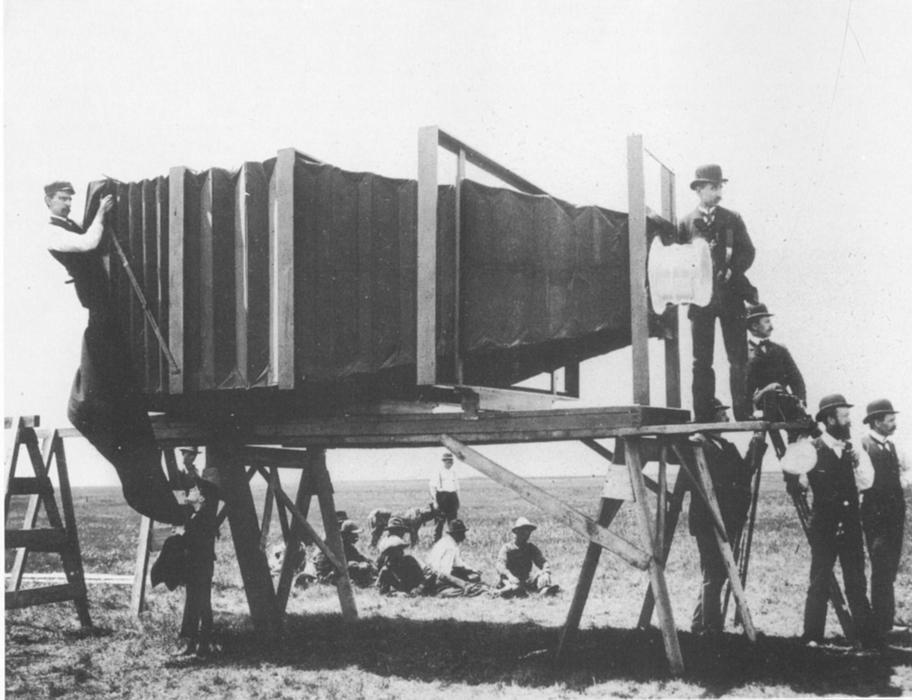
The giant camera built by Lawrence in 1900

In 1909, while he was away on an expensive and frustrating adventure attempting to take aerial photographs of wild animals in British East Africa, his wife found that he had been having an affair with one of his secretaries. Upon his return, he fled to California, taking his sons with him. He then turned from photography to aviation, building an aircraft at a factory in Chicago. He would be granted nearly a hundred patents for aviation-related devices.

He divorced his first wife, Alice Herendeen, in 1913 (with whom he had had two children, Raymond Welcome Lawrence and George Lee Lawrence), and married Adele Frances "Della" Page in 1916. She was born in St. Louis, Missouri and was the daughter of Henry J. Page, an architect. George Lawrence was 48 years old and Della was 22 years old when they married. They had four daughters: Clara Antoinette, Virginia Lee, Ruth Adele, and Martha "Louise" Lawrence.

Lawrence's aircraft company folded in 1919. He died in 1938, aged 70, and funeral services were held at St. Gertrude's Roman Catholic Church in Chicago. He was buried at St. Joseph's Cemetery in Manteno, Illinois.

== Timeline ==
- 1900 Photograph Chicago & Alton Railway's Alton Limited Train
- 1906 San Francisco, California earthquake ruins
- 1908 Reconstruction pictures of San Francisco, California
