= Syria-Cilicia commemorative medal =

Syria-Cilicia Commemorative Medal
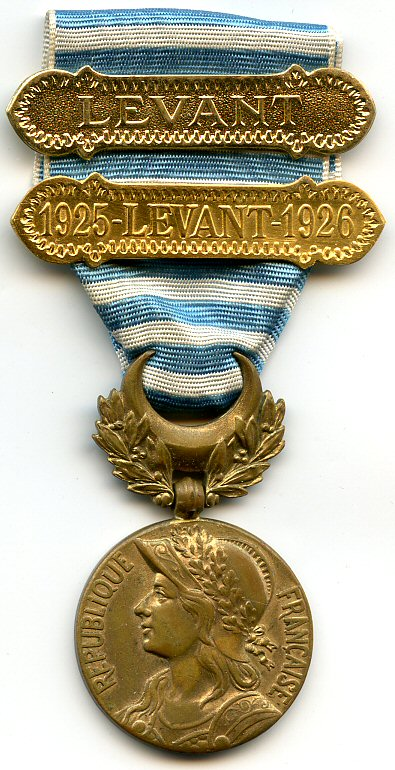
- Levant Medal
- Type: Campaign medal
- Awarded for: Middle Eastern campaigns between 11 November 1918 and 30 September 1926
- Presented by: France
- Eligibility: French nationals, soldiers attached/ under French flag
- Clasps: "Levant" and "1925-Levant-1926"
- Established: 18 July 1922
- Medal ribbon

Precedence
- Next (higher): Médaille commémorative de la guerre 1914–1918
- Next (lower): Dardanelles Campaign Medal

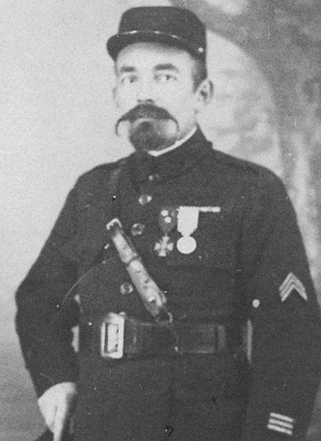
Father Jules Chaperon (military chaplain), Syria-Cilicia Medal recipient

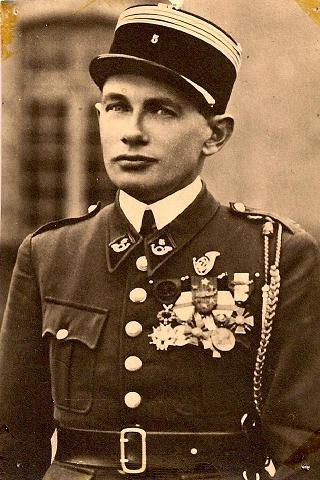
Brig-Gen Georges Journois, Syria-Cilicia Medal recipient (Levant)

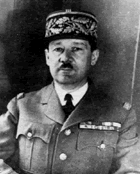
General Jean-Édouard Verneau, Syria-Cilicia Medal recipient

The Syria-Cilicia Medal (French: "Médaille commémorative de Syrie-Cilicie") was a French decoration awarded to military personnel engaged in the hostilities that erupted in the Middle East in the immediate aftermath of World War I.

Instituted in 1922, this campaign medal was awarded by the French Government for military service in the interwar period, to those serving on its behalf, since 1918, against de facto powers in The Levant.

The Levant Campaign began in January 1920 when the Arab Kingdom of Syria engaged French armed forces in what would become called the Franco-Syrian War. This campaign ended on 24 July 1920, when French troops entered Damascus abolishing the Arab Kingdom of Syria. Turkey took advantage of the situation by also engaging France in what is now called the Franco-Turkish War pitting the French Colonial Forces and French Armenian Legion against the Turkish forces known as the Kuva-yi Milliye. This campaign, running from May 1920 to October 1921 resulted in French partial occupation of Turkish territory.

An uneasy peace ensued which was broken on 23 August 1925 when Sultan Pasha al-Atrash declared revolution against France, thus starting the Great Syrian Revolt (also called the Great Druze Revolt), which took several years for the French Government to subdue.

== Award history ==
The Syria-Cilicia Commemorative Medal was instituted by a decree of 18 July 1922 following a Bill initiated by a French deputy, General de Castelnau, who was also president of the French Military Commission.

An almost identical Vichy-sponsored medal was produced during World War II to recognize engagements fought by its forces in the same area from 8 June to 12 July 1941, it was adorned with the clasp "LEVANT 1941". Most battles were between Vichy forces and Free French Forces, this was and still is a source of national pain for France. Consequently, a law of 12 April 1944 abolished this medal and its right to be worn.

== Award statute ==
The Syria-Cilicia Commemorative Medal was bestowed upon the Army of the Levant (and Allied naval/air force personnel operating off the coast of Syria-Cilicia, between 11 November 1918 and 20 October 1921); as well as members of the military who took part in the operations carried out between 21 July 1925 and 30 September 1926; to civilian personnel of French nationality, fulfilling the same prerequisites as soldiers or sailors in earning this award.

Prior to 1939, a series of decrees allowed for its bestowal after 30 September 1926 under very specific conditions. These awards to both civilian and military personnel on special assignment in Lebanon or Syria were very rare. For conferral after 1926, the medal is worn without a clasp.

== Award description ==
The Syria-Cilicia Commemorative Medal is 30mm in diameter circular and struck from bronze. The obverse bears the relief image of the "La République" in the form of the left profile of a helmeted woman's bust, the helmet being adorned with a crown of oak leaves. On either side, the relief inscription along the circumference "RÉPUBLIQUE FRANÇAISE" ("French Republic").

The reverse, representing both the army and navy, bears the relief images of an infantry rifle crossed with a naval anchor below two military banners and lances surmounted by the relief inscription "LEVANT". On some variants, the relief inscription "HONNEUR ET PATRIE - SYRIE-CILICIE" ("Honour and Country - Syria Cilicia") or only "HONNEUR ET PATRIE" can be found on one of the banners. In the background, sand dunes, the wall of a Kasbah and palm trees.

The medal hangs from a ribbon through a ring passing through the medal's suspension loop. The ring is adorned by a 24 mm in diameter bronze laurel wreath and half crescent. The white silk moiré ribbon is 37 mm wide with 3 mm high blue horizontal stripes 3 mm equidistant.

Two gilt clasps with oriental ornamentation can be worn on the ribbon. The first bearing the inscription "LEVANT" for participations in the operations between 11 November 1918 and 20 October 1921. The second clasp bearing the relief inscription "1925-Levant-1926" for operations against the Druze. Both clasps can be earned and displayed simultaneously on the ribbon.

== Notable recipients (partial list) ==
- General Georges Catroux
- General Mariano Goybet
- General André Hartemann
- General Georges Journois
- General Raoul Magrin-Vernerey
- General André-Gaston Prételat
- General Jacques-Théodore Saconney
- General Raoul Salan
- General Jean-Édouard Verneau
- Colonel René Génin
- Captain Tounsi Tayeb
- Father Jules Chaperon

== See also ==
- French Mandate for Syria and the Lebanon
- French Mandate of Lebanon

== Sources ==
- http://www.france-phaleristique.com/accueil.htm
