= Georges Journois =

French military officer

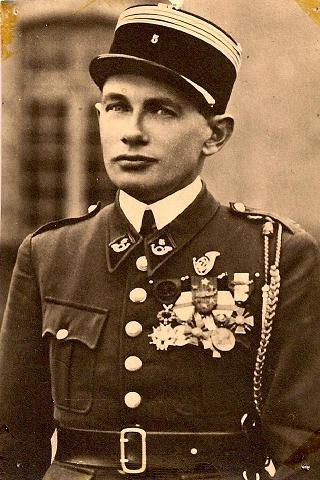
- Born: 13 November 1896; Bosc-Bordel, Seine Maritime, France
- Died: 26 September 1944 (aged 47); Wilhelmshaven, Germany
- Military career
- Allegiance: France
- Branch: French Army; O.R.A.
- Service years: 1914–1944
- Rank: Général de Brigade
- Conflicts: World War I; Franco-Turkish War; Rif War; World War II
- Awards: Officer of the Légion d'honneur; Croix de Guerre 1914–1918; Croix de Guerre 1939–1945; Croix de Guerre des TOE; Médaille de la Résistance; Croix du combattant volontaire de la Résistance; Croix du Combattant 1914–1918; Croix du Combattant 1939–1945; Médaille Coloniale-Maroc; Médaille Interalliée 1914–1918; Médaille commémorative de la guerre 1914–1918; Médaille commémorative de la guerre 1939–1945; Médaille de la Déportation pour faits de Résistance; Médaille commémorative de Syrie-Cilicie; Commander of the Order of Ouissam Alaouite

Georges Henri Journois (13 November 1896 – 26 September 1944) was a French resistance fighter and Brigadier General who died in a subcamp of the Neuengamme concentration camp in Wilhelmshaven, Germany.

== Early life ==
Journois was born on 13 November 1896 to Pierre Hyppolite Journois (4 March 1858 – 7 January 1935) and Henriette Grillière (7 February 1858 – 27 June 1906). Journois had a sister Georgette and a brother Roger, fraternal twins born on 21 April 1903. Roger died in infancy in December 1904.

Journois lived in the commune of Bosc-Bordel in the Normandy region of France, and went to elementary school there until he and his family moved to the commune of Buchy in northern France in 1906. On 27 June of that year, Journois's mother died; his father remarried on 6 October 1908 to Anne Marie Grebeauval.

Following the move, Journois went to elementary school in Buchy. Later, he was sent to boarding school at Armentières in northern France. He was an excellent student and was accepted at the School of Arts and Crafts in Armentières where he hoped to become an engineer.

== Military career ==
=== World War I ===
When World War I began in 1914, Journois was too young to be enlisted and stayed in school. One year later, on 13 April 1915, he was called up and enlisted into the 3rd Engineers Regiment. He was then transferred to the 101st Infantry Regiment on 29 May 1915 and was sent on the same day to the École spéciale militaire de Saint-Cyr (St. Cyr Special Military School) to become an officer. He stayed there until 1 September 1915 and was promoted to the rank of Warrant Officer. He was assigned to the 103rd Infantry Regiment on 2 October 1915 and, a few days later on 7 October, to the 130th Infantry.

He was deployed to the front on 5 December 1915. He fought with the 9th Battalion of the 130th Infantry until 25 March 1916, when he was transferred to the 412th Infantry. In April, his battalion was in Champagne at the Boyaux camp. He was temporarily promoted to the rank of second lieutenant on 29 June 1916. He was awarded his first Order of the Army Corps on 3 July 1916, making him a recipient of the Croix de guerre with bronze star.

He stayed in the Verdun area until May 1917, when he was lightly wounded in the face. His battalion took a position in Helly Ravine, close to the village of Fleury, at Caurrières Wood. In the trenches at Caurrières Wood, he was briefly taken prisoner of war. This action gave him his second Order of the Army Corps on 29 July 1917, the Croix de guerre with palm. On 6 July 1917, he was promoted to second lieutenant.

During July 1917 he saw action at Fort Vaux at Fort Souville, in the Caillete ravines, and in Bazil. At the end of the July and in the August he took part in the attack retaking Vaucouleurs, which got him back his War Cross with palm. In the September he fought at Andernay.

In January 1918, the 412th Infantry broke through Domrémy-La-Pucelle. In the February and March, he was in the Nomény sector. In May, he was in the area of Croix-en-Ternois, Pas-de-Calais. In the June and July, he was in the Verzy area (Aisne) where he was wounded in the leg. He was promoted to lieutenant on 16 June 1918, and in July 1918 received his third medal: a Divisional Order of 27 July 1918 awarded him a Croix de guerre (Silver Star).

On 3 August 1918 he obtained his fourth citation, the Order of the Army Corps (Bronze Star).

In August and September 1918, he was treated at the hospital at Argentan, Orne.

On his return to his regiment in October 1918, he participated in an attack that earned him another medal, the Order the Army Corps (Red Star) on 3 December 1918. After the Armistice, the Colonel commanding the 412th Infantry was to award him a sixth citation, the Order of the Regiment (Bronze Star), dated 27 February 1919.

=== Cilician campaign ===
After the German surrender, Journois chose to stay in the army and continued his service in the 412th Infantry. He remained in the Laon area (Aisne) until May 1919 before removing to Sorgues (Vaucluse) to prepare for his departure to the Levant, because after the war a national resistance movement against the Allies had developed in the Ottoman Empire.

During the war Turkey had been allied with Germany. The Paris Peace Conference sought to apply the principles of self-determination to the Arab and Armenian minorities, which endorsed the division of the empire between France, Italy, and Greece. Even though the Sultan had accepted the Allies' propositions, the arrival of 20,000 Greek soldiers was enough to ignite Turkish opinion in a desire for revenge and to rally many supporters of the national movement of Mustafa Kemal Atatürk. The military uprising began on 5 August 1919.

Under the orders of General Gourand, French troops were sent to the Levant to relieve the British troops in Syria and Cilicia.

A company from this regiment, under Commander Mesnil, was designated to take up a position in Pozanti. Journois, Mesnil's Assistant Officer, took part in this. He took part in preparing the support base to resist assaults and repel Turkish attacks. He took part in defense and in counterattacks. He suffered a siege, the French reinforcements having never arrived, and decided to return to the French battle lines. He participated in the night march to avoid the Turkish forces and fell with what was left of the battalion in an ambush; everyone became Turkish prisoners. He was held captive for a year and four months, from 30 May 1920 to 25 September 1921.

During this captivity, on 6 June 1920, he was named Knight of the Legion of Honor and upon his release, on 24 October 1921 he was inducted into the Order of the Army of Levant and received the War Cross in Foreign Operations, with palm.

=== War of the Rif ===
On his return to France at the end of the campaign, he took leave and then was assigned to the 23rd Algerian Infantry Regiment ("Skirmishers") in occupied Germany at Wiesbaden. He served from 26 April 1922 to 28 April 1924. He was first assigned to a company and then became deputy chief officer of the battalion. In 1923, he was employed for company and platoon level instruction of junior ranks. He also served as a mathematics teacher for candidates at the National School for Active Servicemen in Saint-Maixent. On 28 April 1924, he was seconded to Versailles to take technical courses in reception and transmission. He joined his unit on 23 July 1924 and remained in Germany with the 23rd Algerians until 9 August 1925, when he posted back to make transmissions with the Army of the Rhine.

His regiment was assigned to serve in Morocco, where he landed on 13 August 1925. He was posted on 23 August at the Moroccan state headquarters of the 3rd Marching Brigade until 3 March 1926 and took part in all operations. During the September and October he took part in all operations of the brigade (Bab Mezraoua, Sof Azeroual, Messaoud...) These operations earned him a Brigade citation on 15 February 1926 and so the War Cross with Bronze Star.

On 5 March 1926 he returned to France on duty leave and was made available to the General Commander of the Overseas Territories. On 22 June 1926, he was again ready to make another trip to Morocco. He was assigned to the 15th Regiment of Algerian Rifles and was in the ranks on 23 June 1926. He was posted on 26 June at the Group General Staff HQ in Fes. He served as an officer of the 4th Office. In August, he was promoted to as an honorary captain. He performed many tasks to link on the front north and operations of the task of Taza. These acts earned him a citation to the order of the Army Corps with a star on the Vermeil Croix de Guerre des TOE dated 14 November 1926. He also received the Colonial Medal with vermeil clip "Morocco 1925 – 1926".

=== Back in France ===
In 1927 he was seconded by the chief of staff as chief officer in charge of communications, then made responsible for instructing No 1 European Company and Platoon. At the end of June, he was seconded as an officer on an order from General Pétin (no link with Maréchal Pétain). On resuming his service, he prepared for the entrance examinations of the School of War. He remained with Pétain until June 1928. He was promoted to captain on 26 March 1928. He left Morocco and at the end of his leave, he was posted to 152nd Infantry Regiment at Colmar on 9 November 1928. He took command of the 9th Company and served until 31 October 1930. During this time, he attained entrance to the School of War. During his stay in Colmar in the 152nd Infantry, one of his companions (and future brother-in-law) got him permission to spend time at Bonnal, Doubs, a small village where he met his future wife.

He was admitted to the Ecole de Guerre (School of War) in Paris on 1 November 1930. His studies and subsequent coursework over two years at the School of War were noted to be brilliant. He was the first in his class on 31 October 1932.

He was married at Besançon on 8 April 1931, and on 14 February 1932, his first son, Jean Claude, was born in Paris.

He was assigned an internship at the General Staff of the 7th Military Region in Besançon where it was announced by the Superior School of War as a matter of choice. As an intern, he went through all the offices of the General Staff where he fulfilled all his duties satisfactorily. At the end of the probationary period, he remained assigned to the staff of the 7th Military Region and in mid-August 1934 he was posted to the 3rd Office. He served in 1935 and 1936, dealing with issues of "coverage" and the preparation of maneuvers to be performed by the divisions of the corps.

Meanwhile, his second son Jacques was born in Besançon on 27 December 1933 and on 8 July 1936 his third son Pierre was born.

He left the General Staff of the 7th military region and on 1 November 1936 was assigned to the 60th Infantry Regiment to complete his commission. He commanded CA2, machine-gunners which he pulled into a remarkable team. He relinquished command of the 60th Infantry on 16 April 1937 and was entered in the competition to be named an officer of the Légion d'Honneur.

On 16 April 1937 he was assigned the command of 5th Battalion of Foot-Soldiers in Heather, Vosges with a mission to rebuild it into a combat unit. He was able to do this in a few months in spite of difficulties due to the dispersion of its various companies and an inadequate barracks.

He was promoted to the grade of chief of the battalion (commander) on 25 June 1937 and named officer of the Légion d'Honneur on 2 December 1937.

His battalion was fully consolidated in Bruyères by mid-1937. In 1938 and 1939, he had got the unit all fighting fit and in the mobilization of September 1939 as a unit ready to fulfill its mission in an armored unit.

=== The Battle of France ===
After the declaration of war, Journois was not to command his battalion in battle to his regret and sorrow. In view of his value and his moments of brilliance, he was posted on 2 October 1939 at the Supreme Headquarters of the territory of operations in the north-east at 310th Office.

On 28 January 1940, he was assigned to the General Staff of the Commander in Chief on the front north-east, 3rd Office. During the active phase of operations, he was particularly distinguished by missions to the IX Army in Belgium (Corapi Army) and the II Army (General Huntziger) during the Battle of the Bulge. He received the Order of the Army (Croix de Guerre with palm 39/45).

Falling back, the Supreme Headquarters moved south. Commander Journois was in Vichy on 16 June, at Montauban on the 21st, at Montélimar on the 25th, at Capvern on the 26th and in Bordeaux the same day.

He was designated to be a member of the French delegation that was chaired by General Huntziger to the German Armistice. He went to Wiesbaden in Germany where the committee headquarters were located. He stayed from 29 June to 17 September 1940. There he saw, like all members of the Armistice, the German desire to humiliate "the vanquished". This stay was interrupted by short visits from German to France, two in July (he saw his family for four days on the second visit) and one in September.

Upon his return, on 17 September 1940 he was assigned to the Office of the Secretary of State for War in Vichy, under General Charles Huntziger the Secretary of State for War until Huntziger died in a plane crash on 12 November 1941. Meanwhile, Journois was appointed to the rank of lieutenant colonel on 25 March 1941.

On 1 January 1942, he was assigned to the Office of the Admiral of the Fleet (Admiral François Darlan) as deputy to the Chief of Staff, General Revers. On 16 April 1942, he was transferred to the General Staff of the Commander in Chief of the military forces of Land, Sea and Air, where he acted as Deputy Chief of Staff. At this point, Journois began conducting resistance activities.

== The French Resistance ==
=== The underground ===
With General Revers, who was his leader in hiding, Journois chaired a number of secret meetings during which he studied the possibilities of resistance to the enemy and the establishment and organization of resistance networks. During this time, he travelled to North Africa with Admiral Darlan. He served in this capacity until 25 November 1942 when he was discharged as a result of the Anglo-American landings in North Africa and the invasion of Free France by the Germans. He went on leave in March 1943. He was recalled to duty on 25 April 1943 and appointed Commander of the Nice division. He was promoted to colonel on 25 May 1943. He assumed his post on 3 May 1943 and fulfilled his role until 1 November 1943 when he was released again.

Meanwhile, as of January 1943, Journois was appointed by his superiors in the underground, as head of the Resistance Army (ORA) in the Alpes-Maritimes region. The ORA was the organization he helped establish in 1942 when he was the Deputy to General Revers. Also in January 1943 he joined the network "Alliance" branch of "Druid" with the nickname of Marcelle Suzanne. He was one of the agents of the France P2 combatants. In June 1943, the unity of the resistance in the Alpes Maritimes cocooned him.

=== Denunciation and arrest ===
After his release, Journois returned full-time to the underground resistance. Although easily discovered by the Gestapo, he remained at his post, fighting. He was identified by a double agent who was placed in the same cell when he was arrested, who managed to earn their trust. He was arrested in Nice on 4 January 1944 with Captain Dupouy, his deputy.

Even when interrogated, beaten and tortured by the Gestapo he did not give up secrets. He was incarcerated in a Nice prison, where his presence remained a secret until May 1944. On 18 May, as a result of negotiations by his stepfather with the German authorities from Lyon, Marseille and Nice, his wife and children were able to enter the premises of the Gestapo to visit him.

During his detention at Nice he was able to write seven "letters" to his family despite German censorship. He found an ingenious way to communicate secretly: filling his dirty laundry package with long, patiently written letters printed in pencil on three lines of his pyjama cords. Prudence dictated that his wife washed out these writings. However, the last braid was retained. Time has erased these but the text was always kept having been transcribed onto paper.

Just before 25 May 1944 (the date of the solemn communion of his eldest son, who had helped his stepfather for the negotiations of 18 May), he was transferred to Marseille to the Baumettes Prison. On 17 June 1944, the Germans evacuated the prison to Belfort (Territoire de Belfort). The Allies' Invasion of Normandy had started a few days earlier, on 6 June 1944.

Faced with the possibility of another Allied landing on the Mediterranean coast (which would occur in August 1944), the resistance detainees were sent from Marseille to Fort Hatry in Belfort. The trip lasted four days and nights during which they traveled in cattle trucks. Upon arrival, they were crammed into cells.

Georges Journois shared his cell with Colonel Bernis from Monaco and Grimonet from Marseille, both of whom had the good fortune to be released from Belfort because their paperwork was missing. In the last days of their incarceration at Fort Hatry, a dozen senior officers were gathered together in one cell, including the following:

- Colonel Piton from Nice, died 26 January 1945
- Colonel Souquieres from Gap died 10 November 1944
- Lieutenant-Colonel Ribiollet from Gap, died 3 May 1945
- Colonel Journois from Nice, died 26 September 1944
- Bernis from Monaco, freed at Belfort
- Lieutenant Colonel Berrurier from Gard, died 11 April 1945
- Colonel Vitrat from Le Mans, died 17 December 1944

On 28 August 1944 (also the date that Nice was liberated), a convoy of trucks was formed, crammed with prisoners from Fort Hatry and from the west of France. The trip in cattle trucks lasted four days, with no straw and little food. On 1 September 1944, Journois arrived at the Neuengamme concentration camp near Hamburg, a concentration camp in northern Germany.

== Deportation ==
=== At the Neuengamme camp ===
The SS, with fierce dogs, guarded the prisoners while the trucks went to the death schlague. The trucks were taken to the camp and parked in the dirt under a large brick building. The prisoners were crowded, tight against each other and the wait began. They waited until groups they were called, stripped, their belongings taken, shorn, registered and tattooed on the forearm. Journois became the number "43936". he had to learn this number in German by heart so as to respond as soon as it was called, on pain of being beaten with batons.

The prisoners were transferred to the "quarantine" blocks. But for the great majority of them, this "quarantine" did not last. They were designated and grouped with other inmates of all nationalities who had arrived before them at Neuengamme to form a commando of more than 1,100 men. After being dressed in the prisoner's uniform of blue and white vertical stripes they were taken by train to the main German naval base on the North Sea: Wilhelmshaven. This command, created by the Germans on the site of a former Hitler Youth camp, is located 4 or 5 miles (6 or 8 km) from the arsenal, where they were sent to work making parts for midget submarines.

The prisoners arrived on 5 September 1944. Initially they were supervised and guarded by the French SS (Charlemagne division). The Kapos who supervised them had also been given a caretaker role by the Germans, and had the power of life or death over the prisoners for whom they were responsible. These prisoners were mainly held under German criminal law (Green triangle).

On arrival, Journois was assigned to Block 3 which would later be decommissioned. At the armoury, he worked in a small workshop beside the forge, where he did ironmongery. He stayed there from 5 September 1944 to 25 September 1944, or 20 days. The schedule was as follows: Wake up, black water called "unsweetened coffee", marching "zu fünf" ("the five"): a 5-kilometre (3 mi) route, work in the arsenal, dinner, a little bread and "unsweetened coffee". There were calls, endless talking about billets, at all hours. For food, only unusually was there some meat in the soup and a few times they saw a bit of jam or margarine.

=== Assassination ===
On 25 September 1944, upon her return to work, his studio rapport woman reported the number 43936, George Journois for some "misconduct" committed. He was called to the center of the square of Appeal, and was savagely beaten by the rapport men. He stood up and asked to be treated as an officer prisoner and not as a regular prisoner. The rapport continued to bludgeon him then called timeout as they were tired. They came back later and continued to badger him.

After this "execution", he was taken to the "Revier" (hospital) where, after some treatment, he was back to his block. In the corner where a few officers had gathered, he was lying on his bench. The night passed and the next morning his friends found that he had died in the night. He was the first French Commander to die, only one Russian had preceded him. One of his companions called for a minute's silence in the block and everyone, whatever his nationality, respected it. The Kapos made them all aware that if such a thing happened again, there would be reprisals.

He was buried in a coffin in the cemetery of Wilhelmshaven, as were the first few victims that followed, but it did not last. After the war, his body was repatriated and he was buried in Besançon in the family vault.

== Awards and recognition ==
- On 15 October 1945, he posthumously received the Médaille de la Résistance, and on 6 May 1946 Bernard Montgomery awarded him a "Certificate of Service". On that day he was commissioned to the rank of Brigadier-General, 20 August 1944
- Decision 900 of 30 March 1954 by the French Minister of National Defense gave him a posthumous Croix de Guerre with palm: "Member of the French Forces of the Interior" (FFI). Arrested 4 January 1944 for acts of resistance. Deported to Germany 29 August 1944, died 31 October 1944." The actual date of his death was 26 September 1944.
- La carte de Déporté Résistant lui est attribué le 23 July 1951 ce qui lui vaut la médaille de la Déportation pour faits de Résistance.
- La carte de combattant volontaire de la résistance lui est attribuée le 4 December 1951 qui donne droit à la Croix du combattant volontaire de la Résistance.
- He also received the Médaille commémorative de la guerre 1939–1945 (Commemorative War Medal).
- Journois's body was exhumed from the Wilhelmshaven cemetery on 9 February 1949. Transferred to the French, the body arrived at Bad Ems in the French Zone of Occupation on 11 February 1949 where a homage was given to their glorioux soules by a delegation of officers and ranks. It was delivered to Strasbourg on 12 February 1949 from where it travelled to Besançon until 9 March 1949. It was with the Bescançon town council on 11 March 1949 who placed his coffin in a Chapel of Rest at the Town Hall. Military honours were given on 16 March 1949. After a religious ceremony in the Saint Peter Basilica, the coffin was placed on a prolonge d'artillerie, and crossed the town of Besançon where the 27th Regiment of the Infantry of the Line gave their honours. An officer carried his decorations on a cushion and followed the funeral procession. On arriving at the cemetery, his coffin was carried to the family grave on the shoulders of six Army men.. After the burial, three homages were given to him by Monsieur Baverel, the erstwhile concentration camp prisoner, by the Mayor of Besançon, and by Colonel Guenin, the Besançon Army Commander.
- Six years later, on Sunday 18 September 1955, the city of Buchy, Seine-Maritime (where he had lived as a child) named a street after him, with plaques engraved:

Rue du Général Georges Journois
Martyr de la Résistance
1896 – 1944

- His name also appears on the war memorial at Buchy and the Deportation Monument at the Chaprais Cemetery at Besançon.
