= Kite aerial photography =

Type of photography

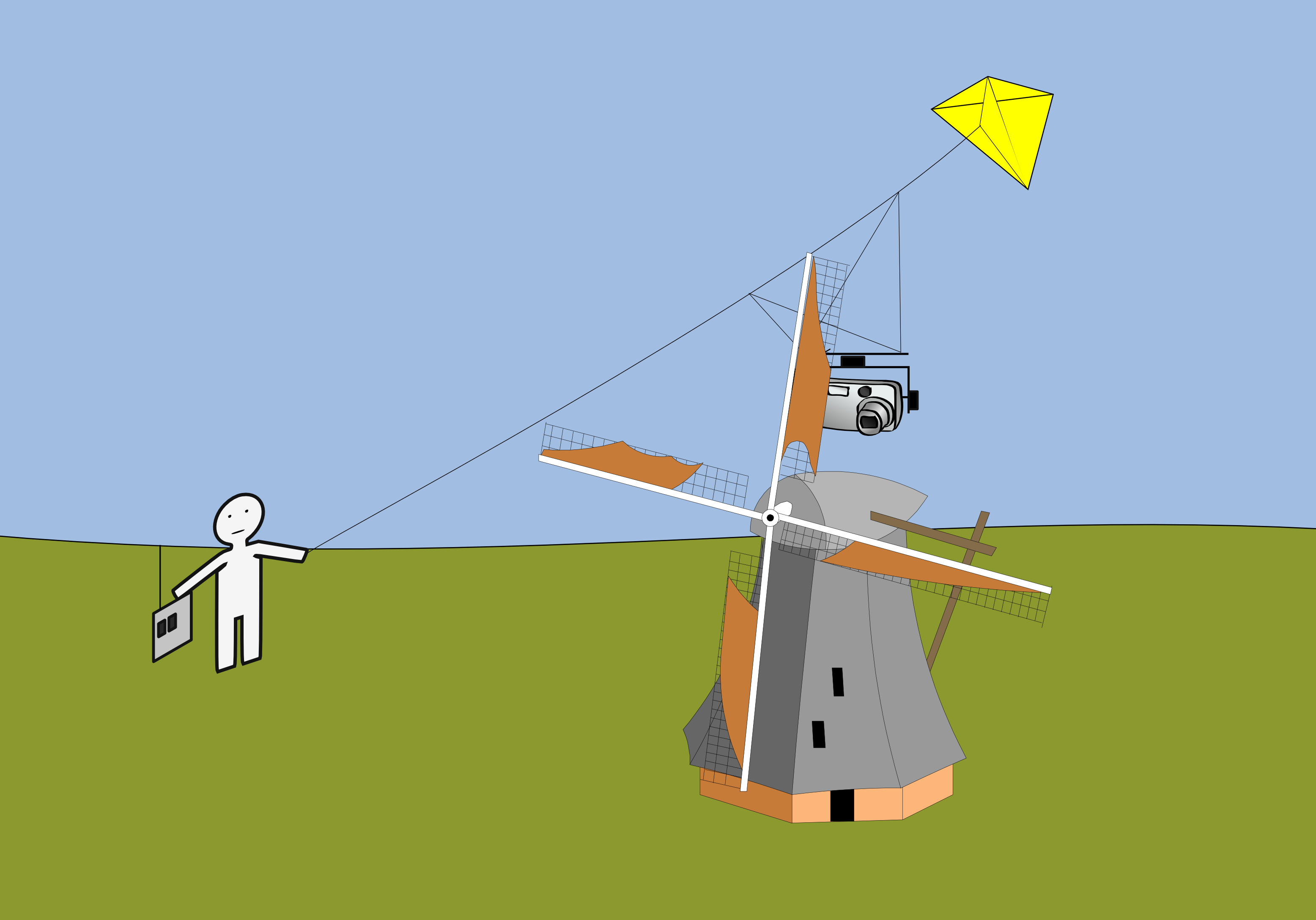
The KAP idea

Kite aerial photography (KAP) is a type of photography. A camera is lifted using a kite and is triggered either remotely or automatically to take aerial photographs. The camera rigs can range from the extremely simple, consisting of a trigger mechanism with a disposable camera, to complex apparatus using radio control and digital cameras. On some occasions it can be a good alternative to other forms of aerial photography.

== Camera rig and stabilisation ==
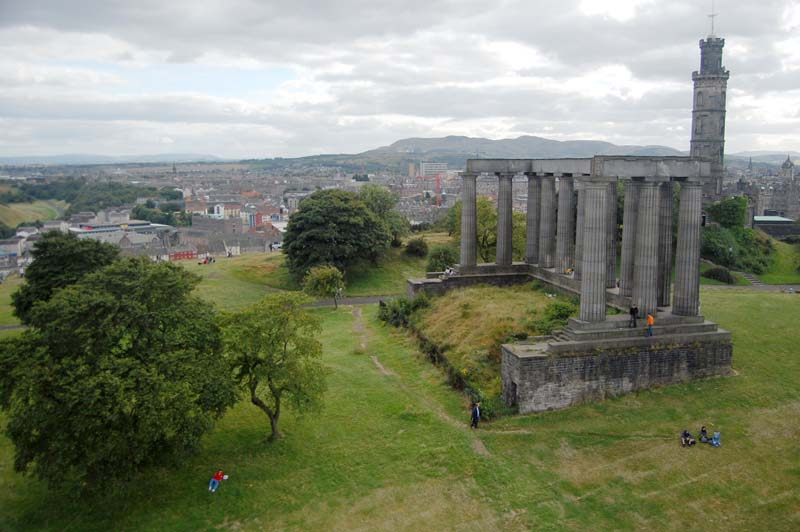
Kite aerial photograph of Calton Hill, Edinburgh

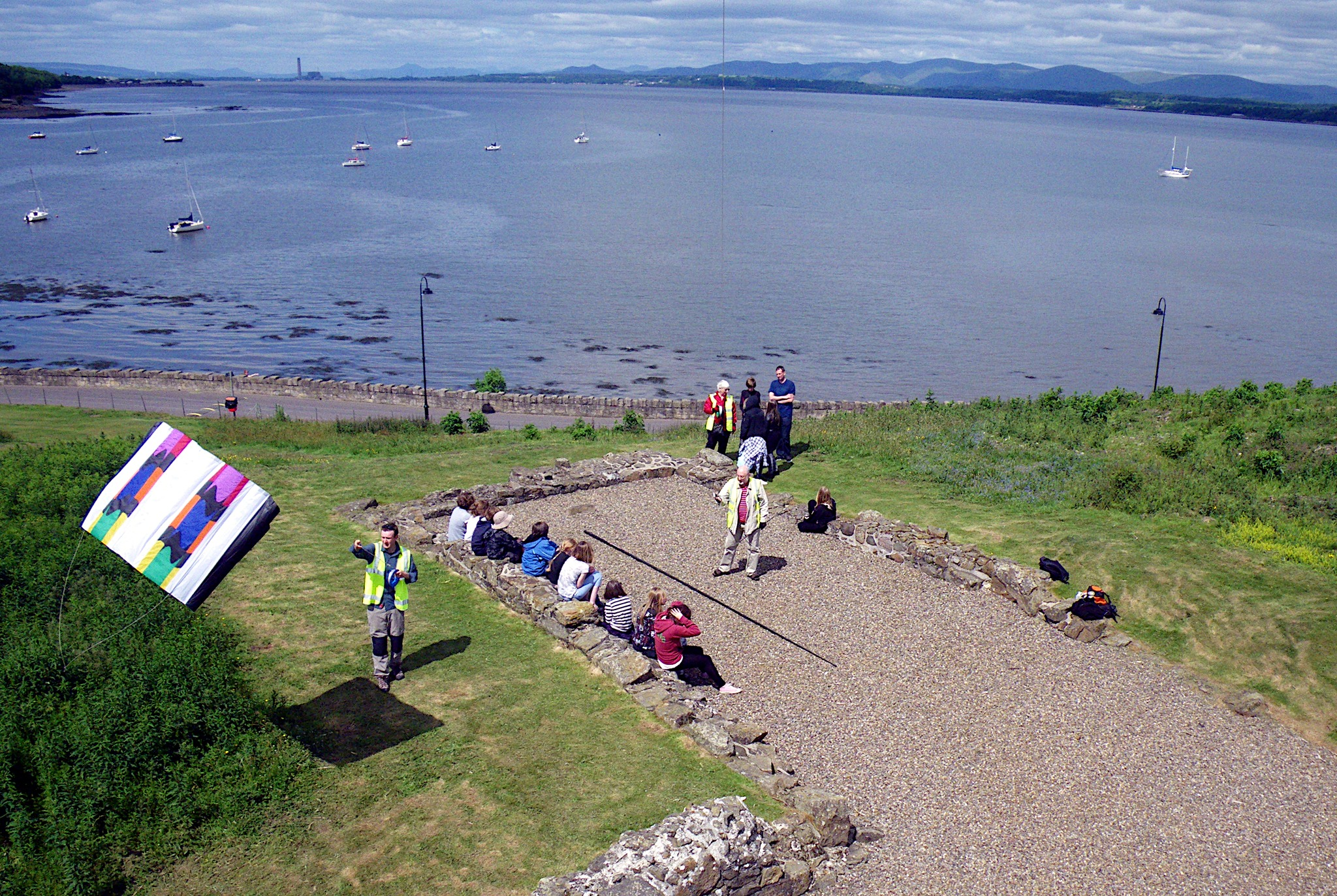
An aerial photography outing of the Edinburgh Young Archaeologists' Club in 2010 with members of West Lothian Aerial Archaeology

The camera can be attached directly to the kite but is usually secured to an adjustable rig suspended from the kite line at a distance from the kite. This distance reduces excessive movement being transmitted from the kite to the camera and allows the kite to be flown into higher, stable air before the camera is attached. If possible, the camera is set to a high shutter speed to reduce motion blur. Cameras using internal image stabilization features can increase the number of sharp photos. In order to take photographs that are oriented correctly with the horizon, a suspension method is used to allow the rig to automatically level itself under the kite line.

=== Pendulum suspension ===
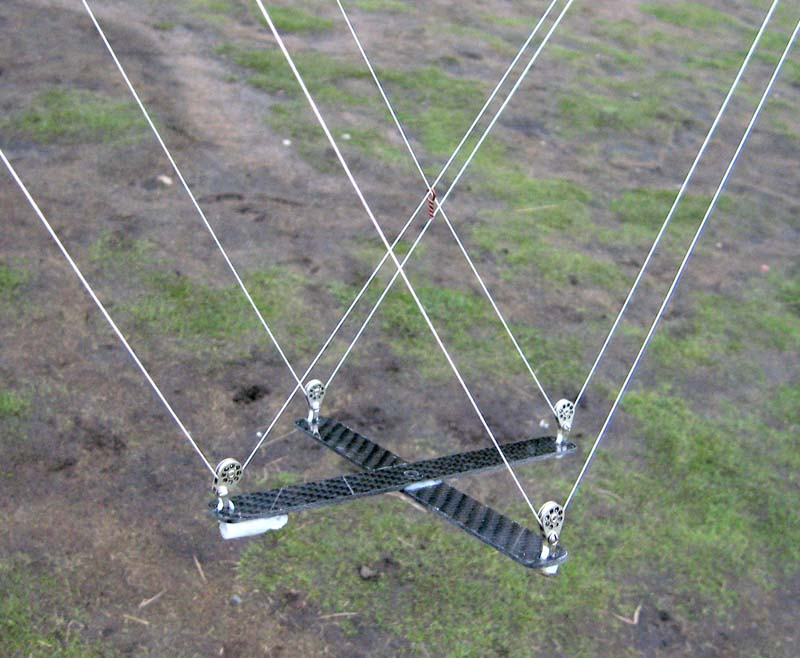
Picavet cross

This simple levelling method involves suspending the camera from a rigid length of material below the kite line. Gravity naturally keeps the rig level, irrespective of the angle of the kite line. The pendulum will oscillate due to movement from the kite line and wind pressure, but the camera will remain steadier and more level than without a pendulum.

=== Picavet suspension ===
A Picavet suspension, named after its French inventor, Pierre Picavet, consists of a rigid cross suspended below the kite line from two points. A single line is threaded several times between the points of the cross and the points of attachment to the kite line and the rig is attached to the cross. The Picavet line runs through eye hooks or small pulleys so that the weight of the rig causes it to settle naturally into a level position. The dimensions and shape of the Picavet have been adapted many times in attempts to increase stability or to improve portability.

== Shutter release and camera positioning ==
The shutter of the camera can be released in several ways, depending on the type of camera and complexity of the rig electronics, if used. Shutter release mechanisms include using a radio controlled servo to press the shutter release button, using an infrared signal or wired connection to instruct the camera to release the shutter, or by using the camera's inbuilt intervalometer. Ideally the camera is allowed to reach its final altitude before the shutter is released to avoid taking photos during launch.

Fixing the camera directly to the kite or line makes changes to positioning awkward. If the camera is fitted within a frame, this 'rig' can be designed to rotate horizontally and vertically and to change the picture format from portrait to landscape by rotating the camera. Adjustments to these angles can be made by manually setting the rig on the ground or by adjusting the rig while it is airborne using a remote control or an automatic controller in the rig. Commonly a radio control system, as used for model aircraft is used. The servos in these systems are readily adaptable to adjust rig positioning. Several automatic controllers have been developed that can take a photo, move the camera by a set angle, take the next photo and so on.

== Kites ==
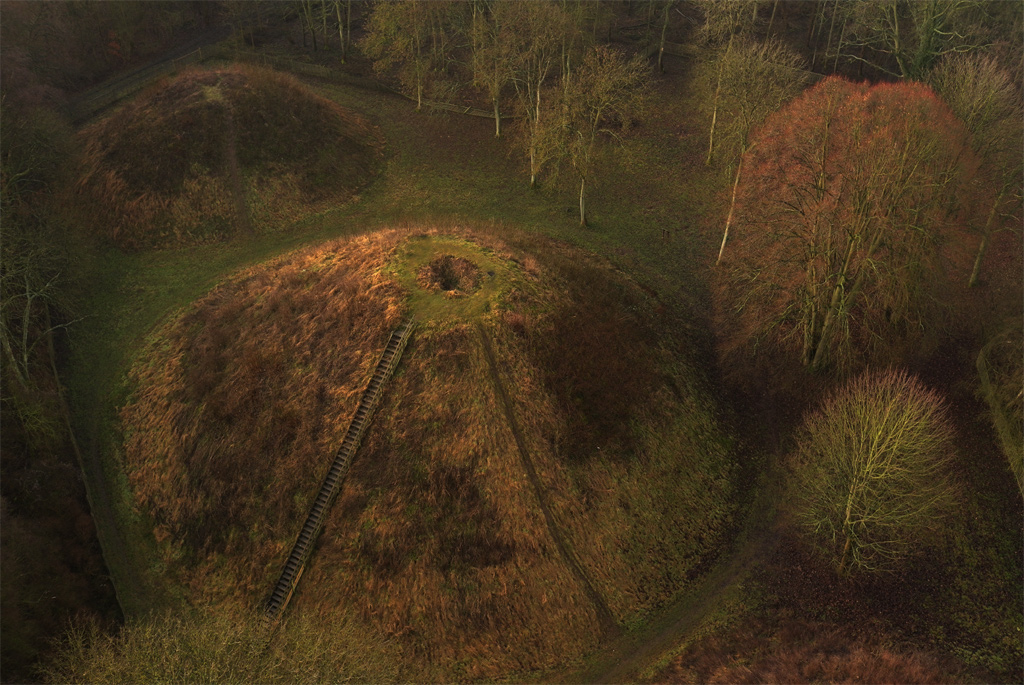
Kite photo of Bartlow Hills tumuli, Cambridgeshire, England

The most important aspect of any kite used to lift a camera is stability. Generally, single lined kites are used as they allow very long line lengths and need less intervention from the flyer than steerable designs. Almost any stable kite design can be used to lift lightweight camera rigs (up to approx 500g/1 lb). As weight increases, specific designs are chosen for their additional flying characteristics, such as line pull, wind speed, flying angle and ease of launch. Widely used designs are parafoil, rokkaku, delta (including variations such as delta conyne) and the new lighter-than-air helikite design. Of these, the parafoil is most popular as it generates a strong pull for its size, and can be easily stored in a small space due to its sparless construction. Sparred kites such as the rokkaku or delta tend to fly at a higher angle than parafoils, which is of benefit when the space between the launch site and photographic subject is limited. A higher flying angle permits the kite to lift more weight, as more of the generated force is acting vertically. Helikites allow reliable KAP in difficult conditions, thus opening up the use of KAP for professional photography.

== History ==
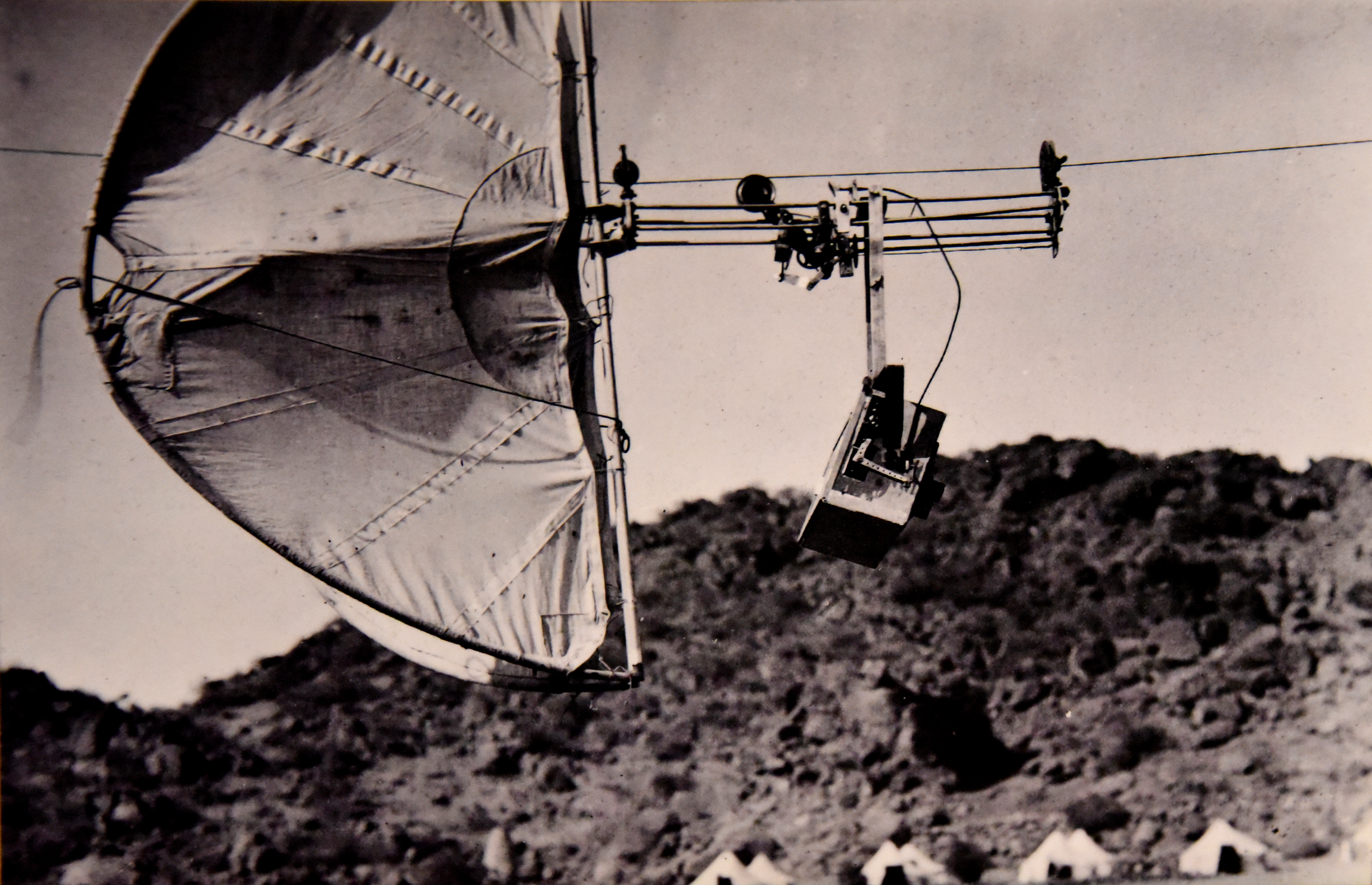
Henry Wellcome's photographic automatic kite trolley aerial camera device, used at Jebel Moya, Sudan, 1912–1913

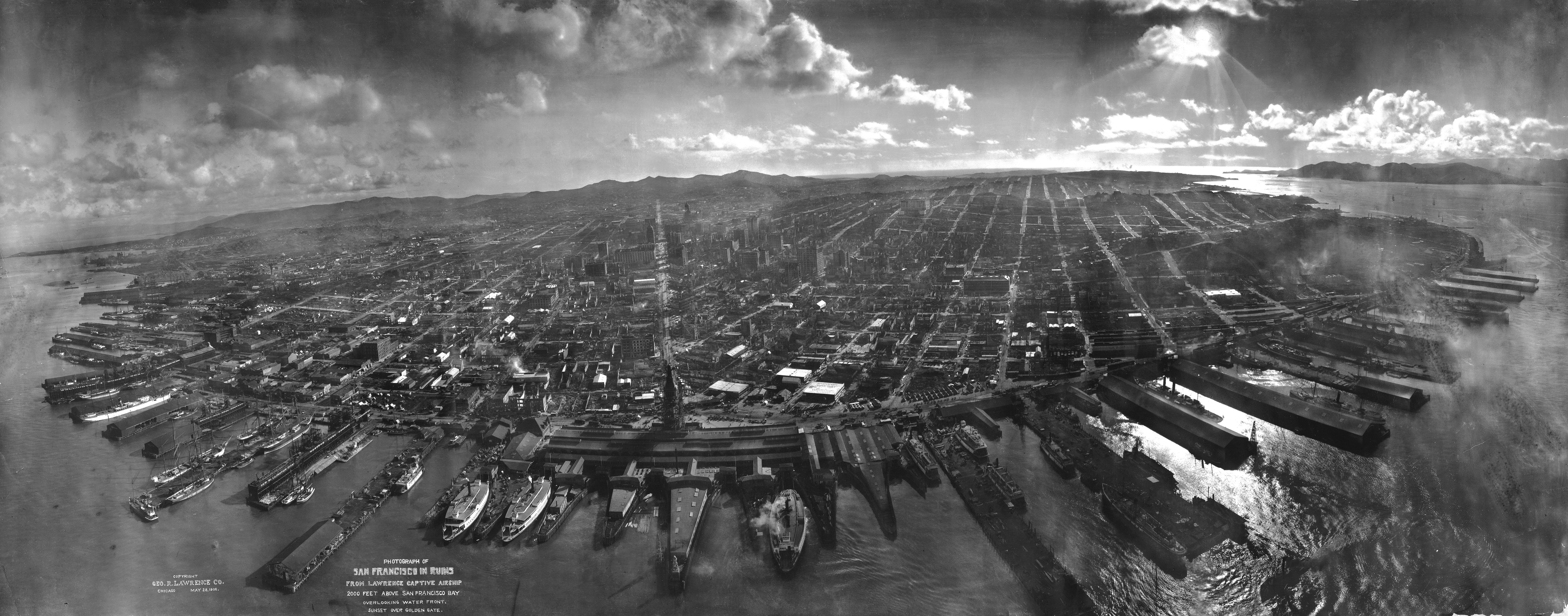
Kite photo by George Lawrence of San Francisco after the earthquake of 1906

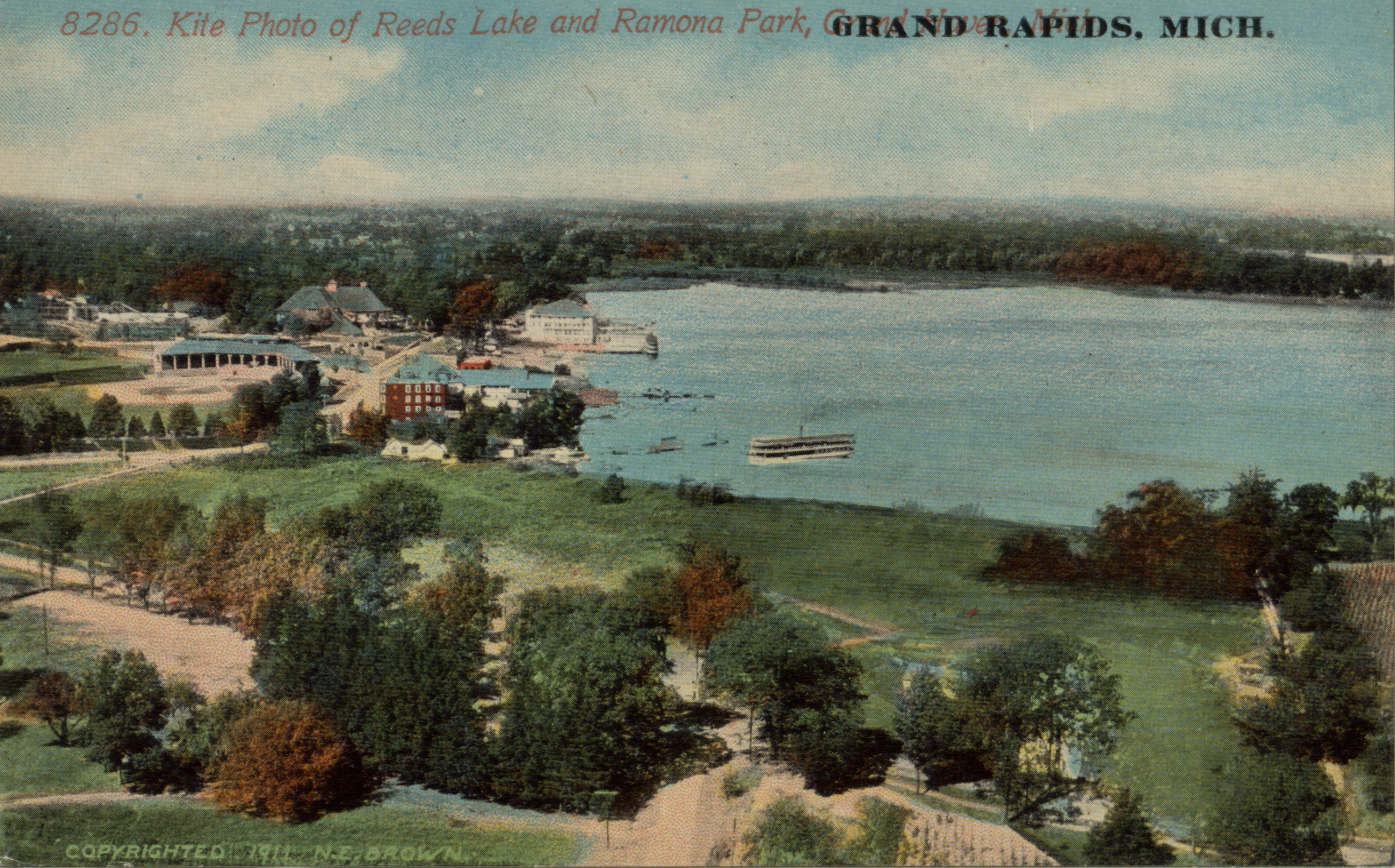
Antique postcard of Grand Rapids, Michigan, image taken using a kite

The first kite aerial photographs were taken by British meteorologist Douglas Archibald in 1887 and by Arthur Batut in Labruguière (France) in 1888.

Manned kite flying and aerial photography were advanced also by French Marcel Maillot, British Robert Baden-Powell, Americans Charles Lamson and William Abner Eddy, Australian Lawrence Hargrave (inventor of box kite in 1893 and kite train in 1884) and French Captain Saconney.

A famous aerial photo of San Francisco after the 1906 earthquake was taken by an early pioneer in KAP, George Lawrence, using a large panoramic camera and stabilizing rig he designed.

== KAP today ==
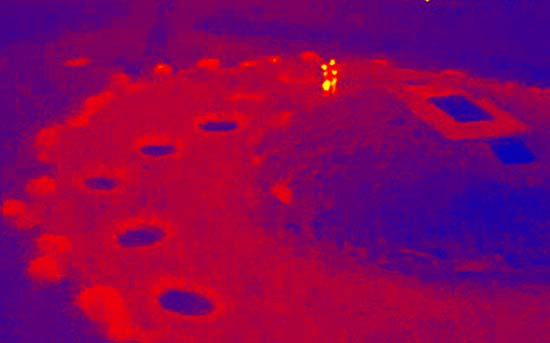
Kite aerial thermogram of Cairnpapple Hill Cairn, West Lothian, with the kite flyers shown standing at the foot of the cairn

With the advent of the Internet, light and affordable digital cameras, radio control and microelectronics, kite aerial photography has become increasingly popular. In latter years, kits have become available that enable a beginner to quickly assemble a functional KAP rig and start taking aerial pictures in the visible part of the spectrum and, with more experience, in the ultra-violet, near and thermal infra-red parts of the spectrum too.

Practical and commercial use of KAP is limited by the unpredictability of the weather (notably wind, sun and rain) and the fact that not every site is suitable to flying a kite. Launching a kite near buildings or downwind of trees can be problematic, due to heavy turbulence. The main applications today are amateur photography, art and, especially, archaeology as described on the webpages of the West Lothian Archaeological Trust. Another growing application is its use for community mapping and environmental monitoring by the widespread Public Laboratory for Open Technology and Science. Research scientists are using kite aerial photography for monitoring bird species and also for studies in the geographical and geological sciences, including photogrammetry. Increasingly, kites are being employed where the use of a small unmanned aerial vehicle (SUAV, commonly known as a drone) is either impractical, or encounters legal or other constraints. Attempts to commercialize KAP have so far been largely unsuccessful.

== See also ==
- Balloon Experiments with Amateur Radio
- Panoramic photography
- Aerial archaeology

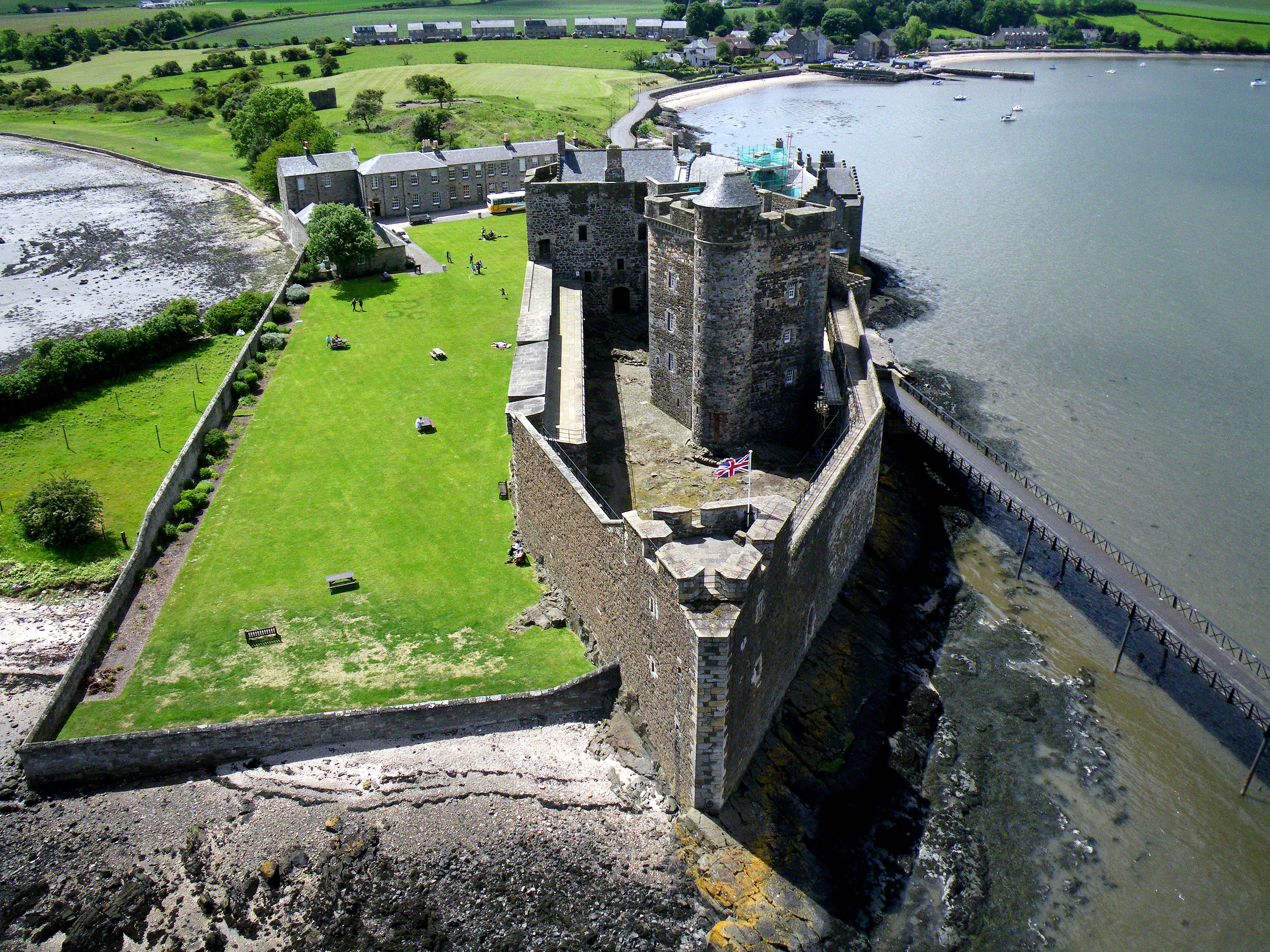
Kite aerial photo of Blackness Castle, Scotland, taken flying the kite from the end of the jetty.

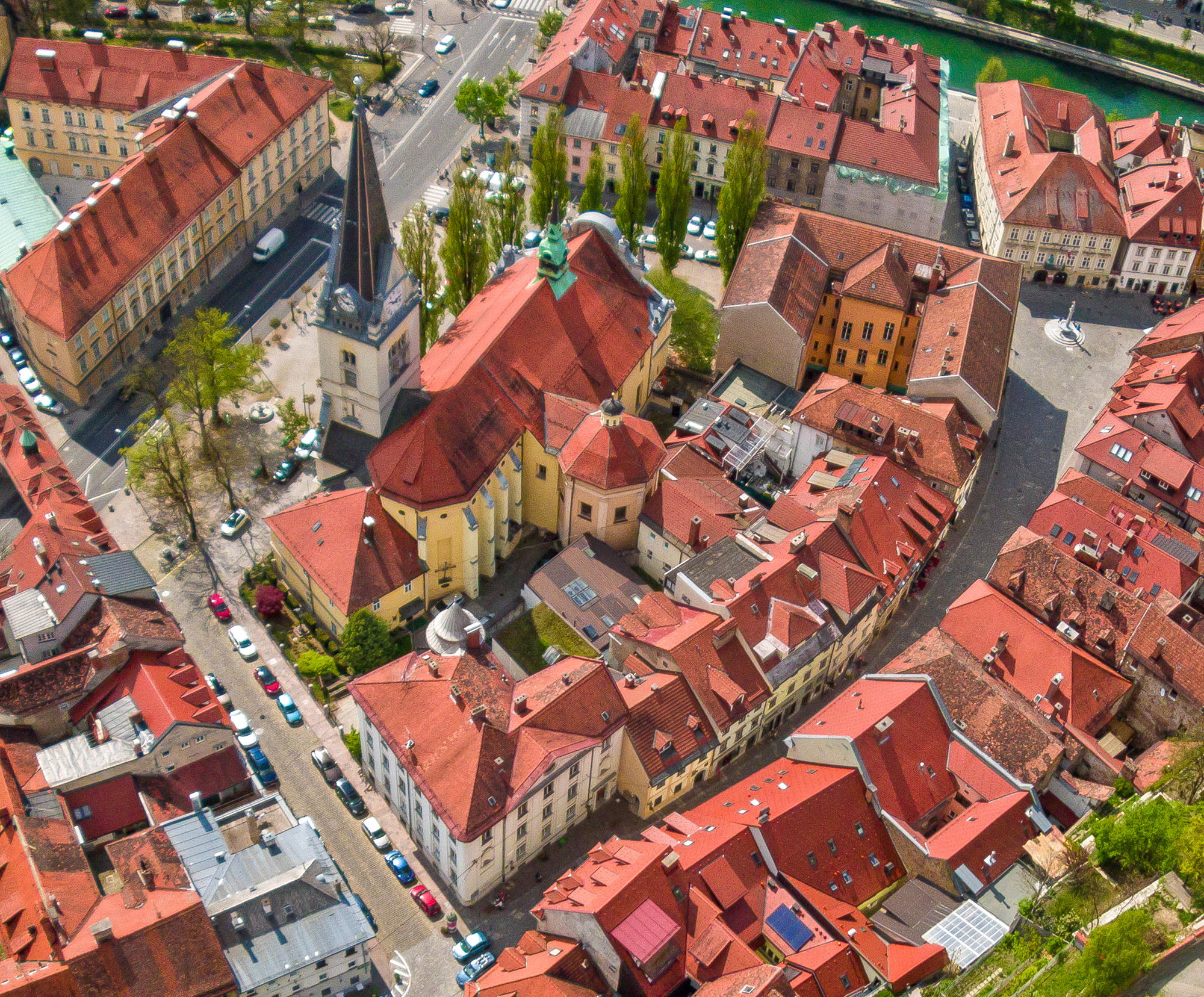
Kite aerial photo of St. James's Parish Church (Ljubljana), Slovenia - one of the winners of Wiki Loves Monuments 2019 in Slovenia photo contest.
