= Abraham Lincoln (train) =

Inter-city named passenger train

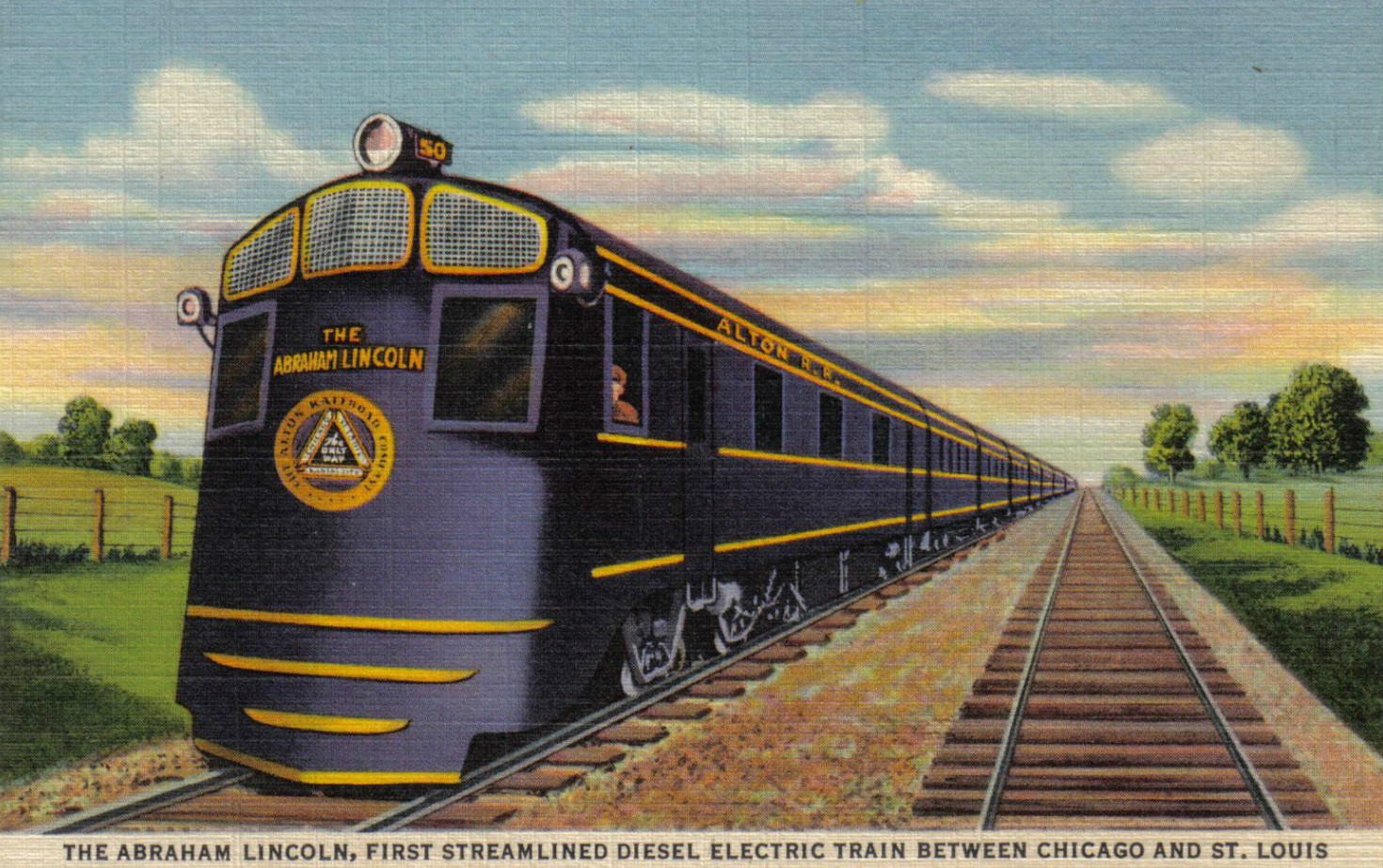
- Postcard depiction of the streamlined train.

Overview
- Service type: Inter-city rail
- Status: Discontinued
- Locale: Illinois and Missouri
- First service: 1935
- Last service: 1977
- Successor: State House
- Former operators: B&O/Alton Railroad (1935–1947); GM&O (1947–1971); Amtrak (1971–1977)

Route
- Termini: Chicago, Illinois; St. Louis, Missouri
- Distance travelled: 284 mi (457 km) (Amtrak)

Technical
- Track gauge: 4 ft 8 1/2 in (1,435 mm)

The Abraham Lincoln was a named passenger train operated by the Baltimore and Ohio Railroad from 1935 into the 1960s. The Abe Lincoln ran between Chicago and St. Louis on the B&O's subsidiary Alton Railroad. The train later passed to the Gulf, Mobile and Ohio Railroad, and then finally to Amtrak, which retained the name until 1978. Service between Chicago and St. Louis is now known by the umbrella term Lincoln Service. This train was the first streamlined passenger service to travel the 284 miles between Chicago and St. Louis, with Joliet, Bloomington-Normal, Springfield and Alton in between. Passengers can get a glimpse of the Mississippi River between Alton and St. Louis.

== Pre-Amtrak ==
The original streamlined Abe Lincoln was one of two non-articulated, streamlined trains built with government assisted funding in 1935. The locomotive, B&O No. 50, was an 1800-hp box-cab diesel made by EMC. After delivery, No. 50 was retrofitted with a quasi-streamlined, sloped front end. The Abraham Lincoln continued to operate following the Alton Railroad's merger with the GM&O in 1947, and one of the streamliner trainsets survived into the 1960s.

== Amtrak ==
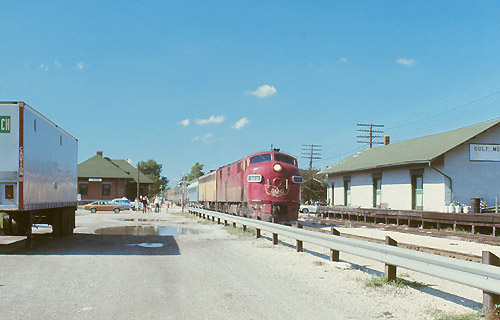
The Abraham Lincoln at Lincoln in 1972

Following its takeover of most passenger rail service in the United States on May 1, 1971, Amtrak retained the Abraham Lincoln as a daily Chicago–St. Louis service, operating in tandem with the GM&O's old Limited. In November of that year Amtrak extended both the Abraham Lincoln and the Limited (now known as the Prairie State) through Chicago to Milwaukee, Wisconsin. In October 1973, Amtrak replaced the rolling stock with the new French-built Turboliner; as part of this change the trains were re-branded as Turboliners and truncated to Chicago. In February 1976 Amtrak returned conventional rolling stock to the route and revived the Abraham Lincoln name along with the Ann Rutledge. Amtrak added the State House to the Chicago–St. Louis corridor in 1977. Also in 1977, Amtrak extended the Abraham Lincoln to Kansas City and renamed it the Ann Rutledge — a name that had briefly disappeared from the timetable in 1976–77 when Amtrak extended the Inter-American to Chicago. Today service between Chicago and St. Louis is handled by the Lincoln Service.

== Equipment ==
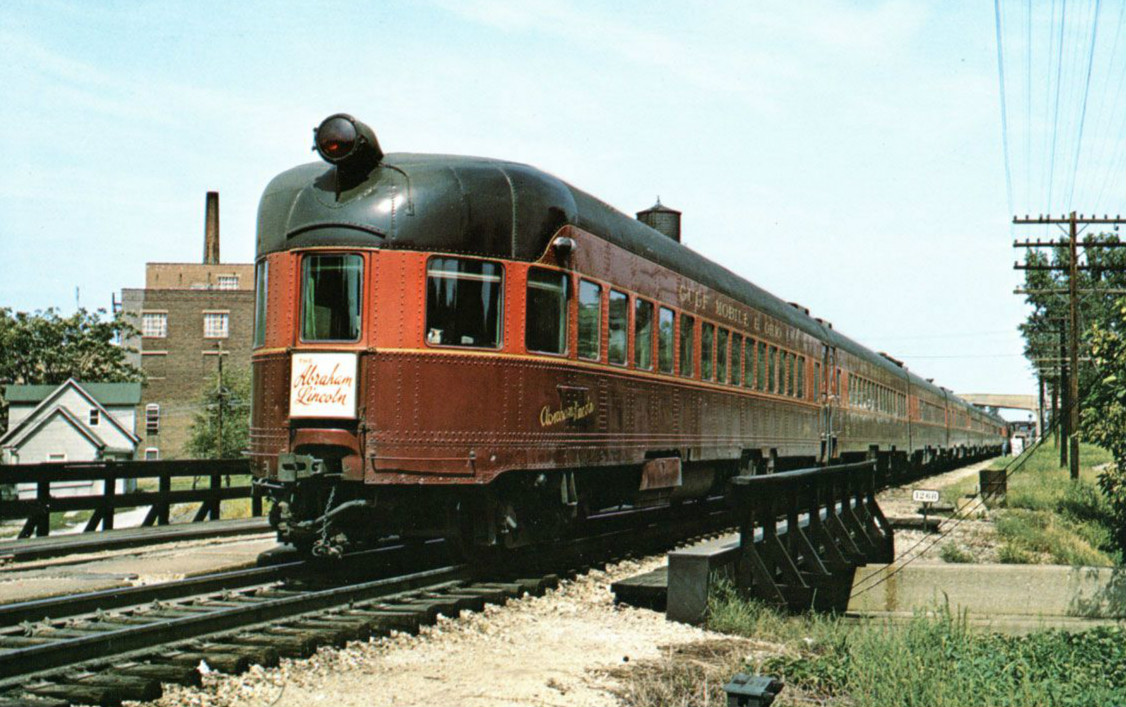
Gulf Mobile and Ohio's Abraham Lincoln ca.1970

Sample consist
Original 1935 consist
- #5751 baggage/mail car; #5803 chair car (64 seats); #5804 chair car (64 seats); #5805 chair car (64 seats); #5701 lunch counter/diner; #5932 parlor car (24 seats); #5933 parlor car (24 seats); #5999 parlor-observation car

American Car and Foundry (ACF) constructed two lightweight trainsets for the B&O, one for the Abraham Lincoln and one for the Royal Blue, which ran between New York City and Washington, D. C. Each trainset consisted of eight cars: a baggage/mail car, three coaches, a lunch counter/diner, two parlor cars, and a parlor-observation car. The B&O rebuilt both baggage/mail cars in 1936: the Abraham Lincolns became a baggage/buffet car with seating for 24, while the Royal Blue's became a baggage/chair car with seating for 44.

On July 26, 1937, the Abraham Lincoln received the Royal Blue's equipment, while the Abraham Lincoln's original equipment was assigned to the Ann Rutledge. This consist included a 60-seat chair car (#5806) that the B&O had built in its own shops in 1936. Both of the consists had the first 64-seat chair car rebuilt into a buffet-lounge, while the lunch counter/diners became full dining cars.

The Gulf, Mobile and Ohio ordered additional chair and parlor cars from ACF in 1947 but otherwise made few changes to the trains' equipment. The new cars seated 68 and 31, respectively.

== Stations ==
| Station | State |
|---|---|
| Grand Central Station (Chicago) (1935–1947); Chicago Union Station (1947–1977) | Illinois |
| Joliet | Illinois |
| Normal | Illinois |
| Springfield | Illinois |
| Alton | Illinois |
| St. Louis | Missouri |

== See also ==
- Ann Rutledge
- Lincoln Service
- Royal Blue
