= Arthur Batut =

French photographer

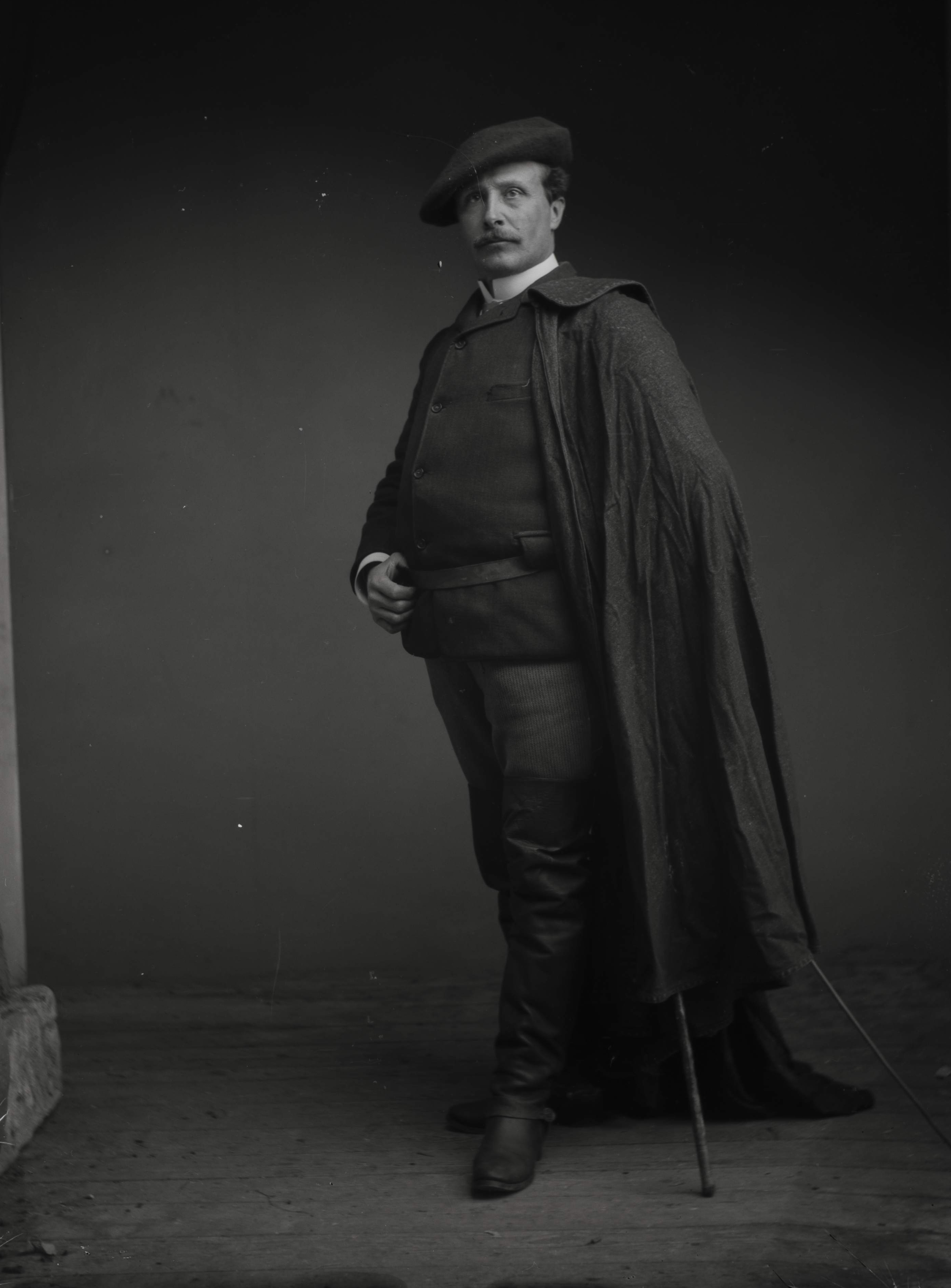
Arthur Batut, self-portrait

Arthur Batut (9 February 1846 – 19 January 1918) was a French photographer and pioneer of aerial photography.

== Life ==
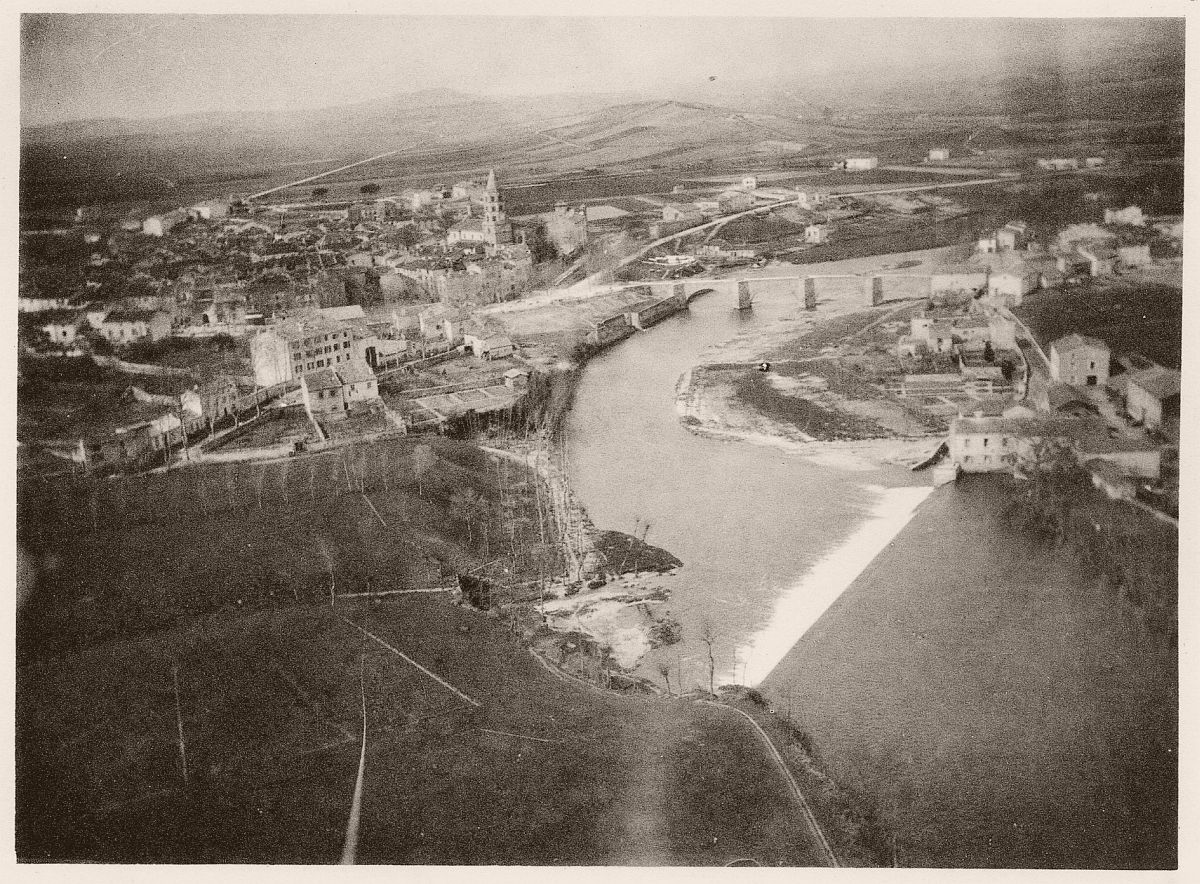
Labruguière, 1889

Batut was born in 1846 in Castres, and developed interest in history, archeology and photography. His book on kite aerial photography appeared in 1890 and contained an aerial photograph taken in 1889 from a kite over Labruguière, where he spent most his life until he died there in 1918. It is believed that in 1887 or 1888 he was the first to use this method successfully.

At the time, kite aerial photography had potential applications for aerial reconnaissance, but also for agriculture and archeology. The first aerial photographs had been taken by Nadar from a balloon in 1858. The use of unmanned kites promised obvious advantages in a military setting.

Inspired by Francis Galton, he also produced composite photographs combining portraits of multiple people onto one plate.

== Works ==
- Batut, Arthur (1887). La photographie appliquée à la production du type d'une famille, d'une tribu ou d'une race. Paris: Gauthier-Villars et fils.
- Batut, Arthur (1890). La photographie aérienne par cerf-volant (PDF). Paris: Gauthier-Villars et fils.
