= Jacques-Théodore Saconney =

French Army general, scientist and balloonist

Jacques-Théodore Saconney (18 January 1874 – 14 July 1935) was a Senior French Army General, a scientist, and an adventurous balloonist.

He foresaw future developments of the French civil and military air navigation. His legacy as an academic provided insights in mathematics and in the development of modern meteorology. As a military officer, he was at the forefront of the early French military and civil aviation with the development of military kites and a new discipline: the kite aerial photography.

== Family background ==
Jacques-Théodore Saconney was born on 18 January 1874 in Turin, Italy. Having its roots in Saconnex, Switzerland (which is located in the suburbs of Geneva Saconnex-d'Arve, Le Grand-Saconnex, or Le Petit-Saconnex), the Saconney family (written at the time Saconex, Saconay, Saconney) escaped the Protestant Revolution by immigrating to France during the 16th century.

His forefathers first settled in Lyon, where a few members of his family left some traces including Henri de Saconay and Gabriel de Saconay.

The Saconay then settled in Burgundy where they cultivated wine in Gevrey-Chambertin. (Note: One of his direct ancestors was called Hugues Saconney and bore the title of "Gentilhomme poussant charette" but the following generation were not confirmed in their nobility.) The tombs of the family still remain in this village. During the 19th century, Jacques-Théodore's grandfather became prosperous in the hotel industry. He followed the construction of the train between Dijon and Turin, and he ended up earning many estates in Turin, Italy, in Dijon and Aix-les-Bains, France.

The coat of arms of the Saconney's: Coupé, au 1 d'argent au lion naissant de gueules, and trois étoiles d'argent.

== A soldier and a scientist ==
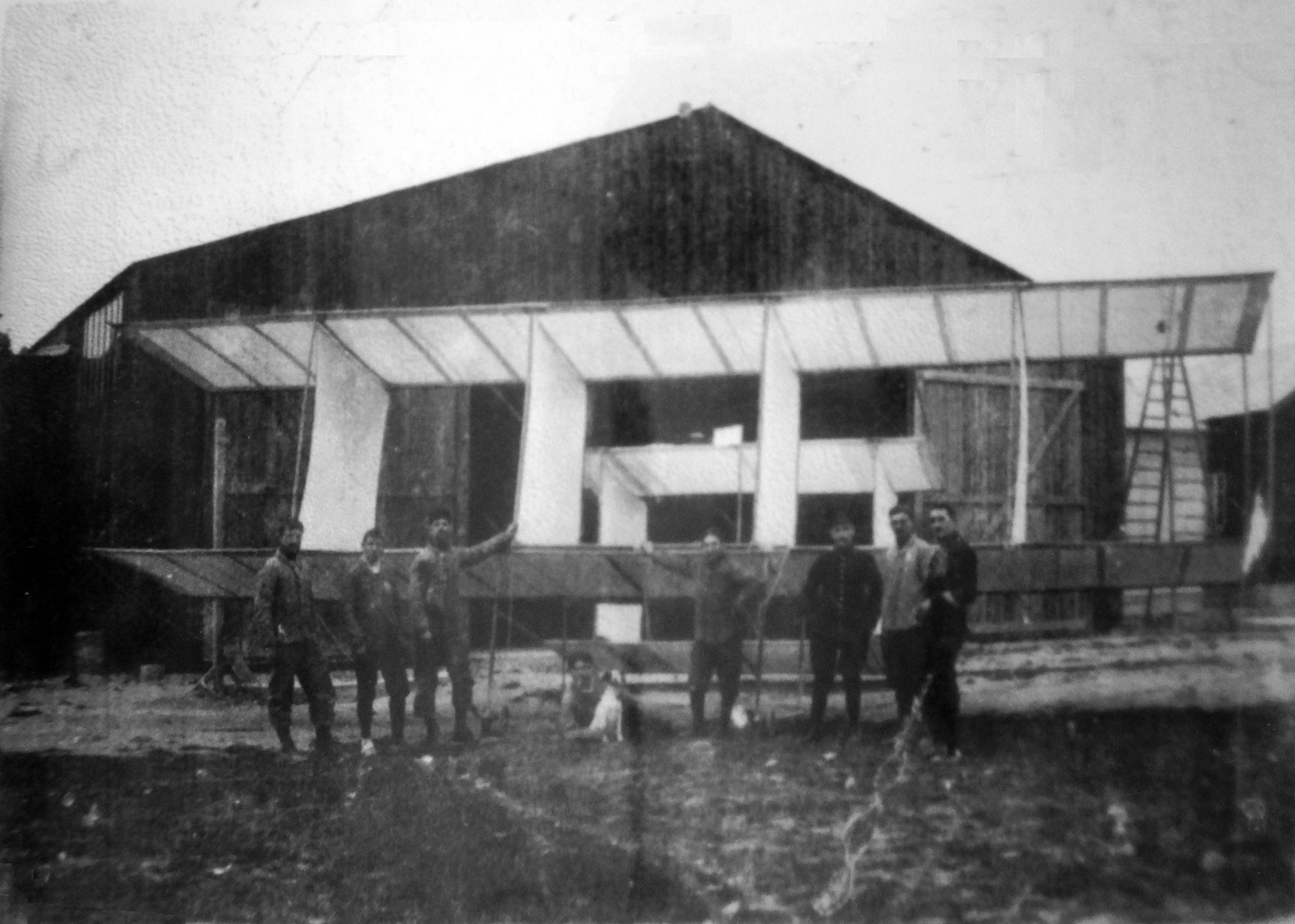
Saconney kite 1910

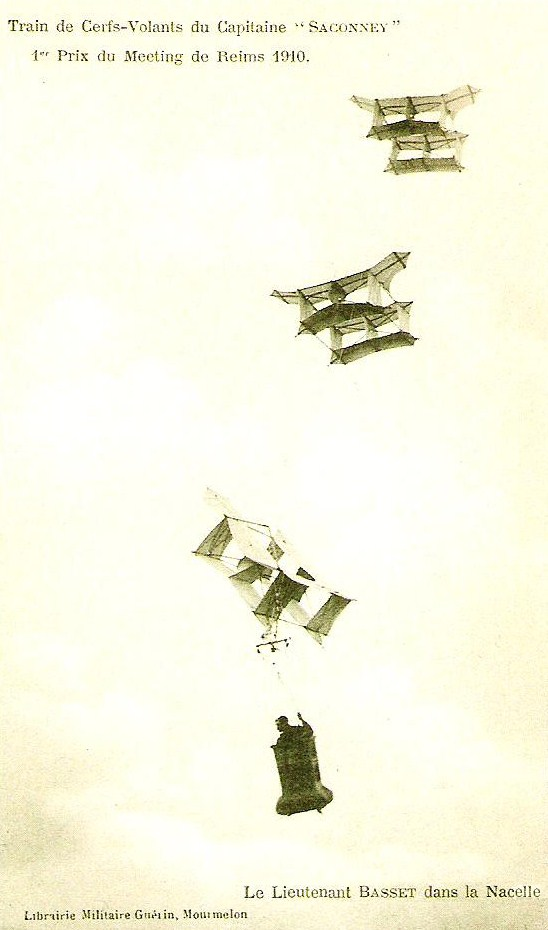
Saconney kites, 1910.

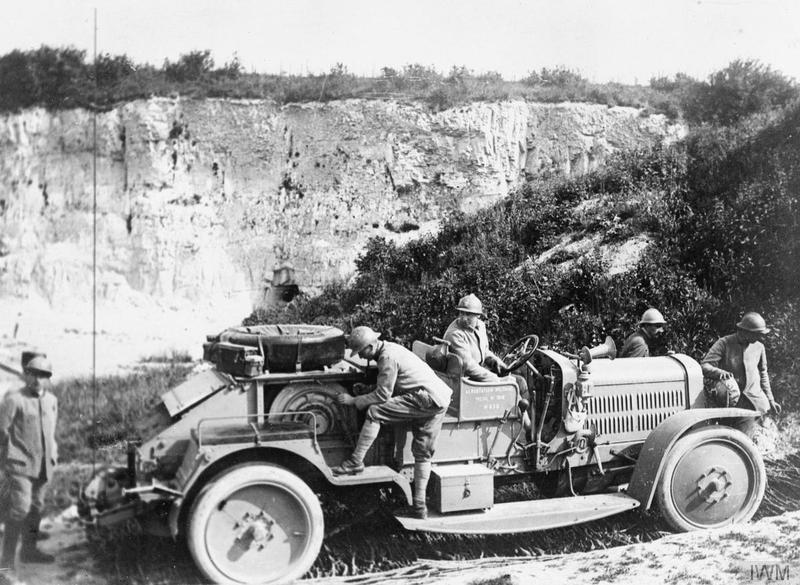
French troops seeting up a motor winch of the observation balloone to establish an observation post at Montchenot (Marne), 7 May 1918 with Delahaye 80.

Jacques-Théodore Saconney was educated at the prestigious High School Henry IV in Paris, France, and was admitted at "l'École Polytechnique", Paris, in 1895.

In 1897, Saconney was appointed an officer in the French Army and he was assigned to the 4th regiment "du Génie" in Grenoble where he became a military balloonist. At first, one of his main interests lied in military observation and in kites. In 1902, Captain Saconney was successful in creating a kite system which was capable of carrying a camera that allowed the establishment of a precise mapping.

In 1909, Théophile Bois and Jacques-Théodore Saconney published a scientific paper explaining the technical reasons why kites remained stable when flying in the air and providing scientific evidence explaining the equilibrium of such flying instruments.

Also in 1909, a competition to determine the most suitable man lifting technique existent at that time was launched. The prize was won by Captain Madiot but he died shortly afterward in a flying accident. As Captain Madiot's system was not fully developed, Captain Saconney's man lifting system was adopted by the French nascent Army Air force. Saconney’s man lifting system contained a motorcar, trailer, and a winch that was driven by the car's engine.

The system was also installed aboard the ship The Edgar Quinet in 1911. In November 1912, Saconney became head of the laboratory of meteorology and aerial photography of Chalais-Meudon.

During World War I, he was in charge of the observation of the enemy. At first, he integrated a Balloonist Company, and in August 1914, Captain Saconney took the command of the Automobile section of the balloon and kite military section which was based in Epinal, Vosges.

== Pioneer of French civil aviation ==
After World War I, Commandant Saconney became president of the Commission for the Application of Meteorology to Aerial Navigation, which later became the International Commission for Aeronautical Meteorology. This Commission provided guidance and coordination to the International Aeronautical Meteorology. This commission was part of the International Meteorological Organization (IMO), the predecessor of the World Meteorological Organization (WMO), which was established in 1919. At that time, he was reckoned to be the authority in his field.

Then he was in charge of organising French civil aviation. Between 1919 and 1922, Colonel Saconney was the director of the civil aviation. In a report from the National Advisory Committee for aeronautics, entitled "commercial aviation in France" (1922), it was said that the first step of the creation of the commercial aviation in France was realised by Colonel Saconney. The report states that between 1919 and 1922, the French commercial aviation acquired its first experience and its supremacy by setting permanent air routes between Paris–London, Paris–Brussels, Paris–Strasbourg–Prague–Warsaw, Paris–Geneva, Bordeaux–Toulouse–Montpellier, Nîmes–Marseille, Toulouse–Casablanca and Bayonne–Bilbao. According to General Nudant, Saconney was the architect of the French military and civil aviation. Further, he launched the creation of different airports including the Aéroport de Marseille on the Étang de Berre.

In 1922, he rejoined the army and became a member of the Council of the French Air Force and went up in the military hierarchy.

Saconney inaugurated in 1926, with the Mayor of Dijon, the first air-lighthouse, specially designed for air navigation, sited on the Mont Afrique.

Saconney died in Dijon on 14 July 1935 leaving behind him two sons and one daughter.

== Legacy ==
The last exhibition of Saconney's kite was held recently in Soissons, France. The grandson of General Saconney attended the event. An Article in French on the life of General Saconney was written by André Mignard in the review " Lucane " in 1980. In addition, a Saconney kite is part of the permanent exhibition of the Otto Lilienthal Museum in Germany.

== Military distinctions ==
The Military distinctions are Grand Officier de l'Ordre de la Légion d'Honneur, French Army General (4 stars) (général de corps d'armée), British, Russian and many foreign decorations.

== Works ==
- Saconney, J. T. Metrophotographie. Octave Doin et Fils, 1913
- Cerfs-Volants Militaires: Théorie pratique de cerf-volant cellulaire et des trains de cerfs-volants. Berger-Levault: 1909
- Saconney, J. T. Le Phare Du Mont Afrique.
