= Bosc-Bordel =

- Commune
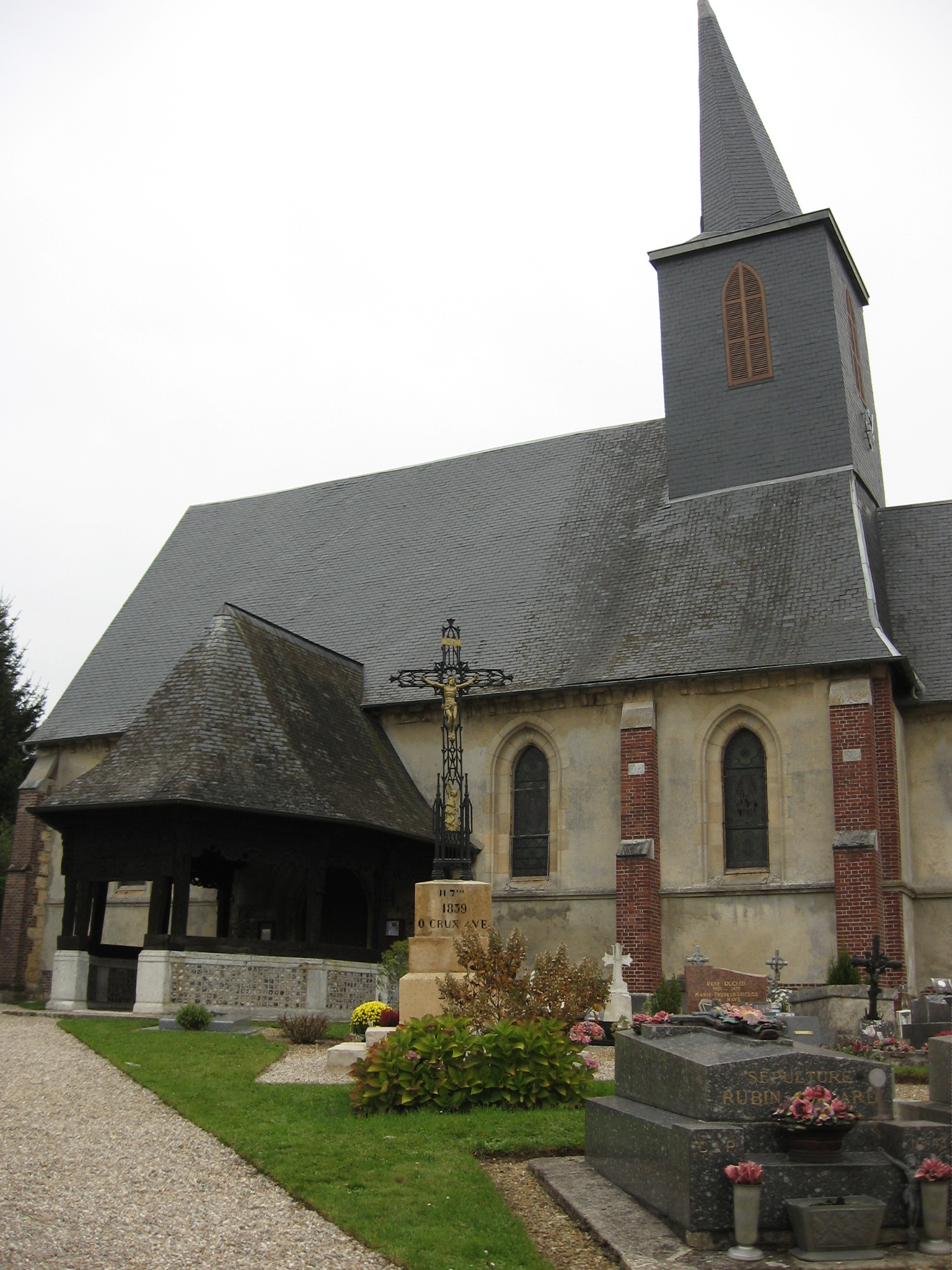
- The church in Bosc-Bordel
- Location of Bosc-Bordel
- Location within France Location within Normandy
- Coordinates: 49°35′39″N 1°24′40″E
- Country: France
- Region: Normandy
- Department: Seine-Maritime
- Arrondissement: Rouen
- Canton: Le Mesnil-Esnard

Government
  - Mayor (2026–32): Fabienne Verhaeghe
- Area^{1}: 11.95 km^{2} (4.61 sq mi)
- Elevation: 233 m (764 ft)
- Highest elevation: 236 m (774 ft)
- Lowest elevation: 192 m (630 ft)
- Population (2023): 455
  - Density: 38.1/km^{2} (98.6/sq mi)
- Time zone: UTC+01:00 (CET)
  - Summer (DST): UTC+02:00 (CEST)
- INSEE/Postal code: 76120 /76750
- ^{1} French Land Register data, which excludes lakes, ponds, glaciers > 1 km^{2} (0.386 sq mi or 247 acres) and river estuaries.

Bosc-Bordel is a commune in the Seine-Maritime department in the Normandy region in northern France.

The inhabitants of the town of Bosc-Bordel are called Bordelois, Bordeloises in French.

== Geography ==
A farming village situated in the Pays de Bray, some 22 miles (35 km) northeast of Rouen at the junction of the D7, D919 and the D38 roads.

== Population ==
Historical population
| Year | Pop. | ±% p.a. |
|---|---|---|
| 1968 | 361 | — |
| 1975 | 337 | −0.98% |
| 1982 | 385 | +1.92% |
| 1990 | 401 | +0.51% |
| 1999 | 440 | +1.04% |
| 2007 | 473 | +0.91% |
| 2012 | 418 | −2.44% |
| 2017 | 452 | +1.58% |
| 2023 | 455 | +0.11% |
Source: INSEE

== Places of interest ==
- The church of St.Jean-Baptiste, dating from the thirteenth century.

== See also ==
- Communes of the Seine-Maritime department
