= Alton Limited =

Alton Limited The Limited
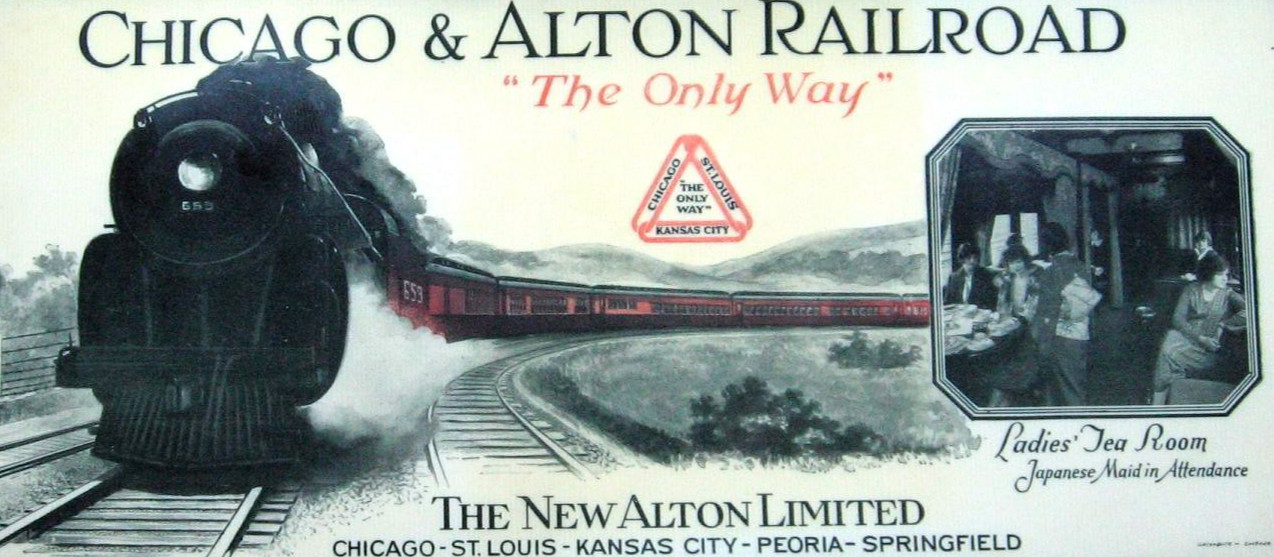
- Promotional blotter for the re-equipped Alton Limited in 1924

Overview
- Service type: Inter-city rail
- Status: Discontinued
- Locale: Illinois
- First service: 1899
- Last service: November 1971
- Successor: Prairie State
- Current operator(s): None
- Former operator(s): Alton Railroad (1899–1947); Gulf, Mobile & Ohio Railroad (1947–1971); Amtrak (1971)

Route
- Termini: St. Louis, Missouri; Chicago, Illinois
- Distance travelled: 284 mi (457 km) (Amtrak)

Technical
- Track gauge: 4 ft 8 1/2 in (1,435 mm)

The Alton Limited (later known as simply the Limited) was the Chicago & Alton Railway's (C&A) flagship service between Chicago, Illinois. and St. Louis, Missouri. It was introduced in 1899 and re-equipped in 1905 and 1924. The name and service were discontinued in late 1971.

== History ==
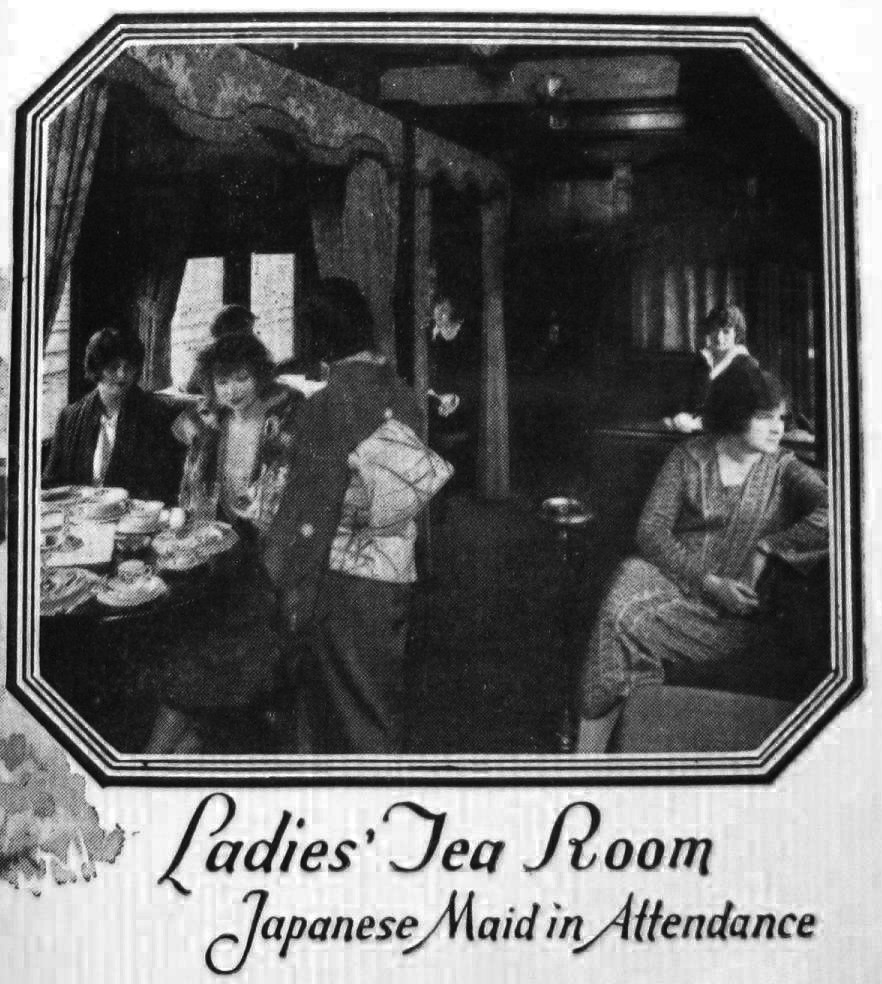
Photo of the Japanese tea room on the train.

Starting in 1903, its motive power was a series of 4-6-2 (Pacific) steam locomotives.

By 1905, it provided regular, daily service with six new cars strikingly decorated in three shades of maroon with gold stenciling, which led to the nickname, "The Red Train." The six-car consist included a RPO car, a combine car, a coach, a diner, and two Pullman parlor cars, one of which was the observation car. The cars were richly appointed, and the Alton Limited was advertised as "The Only Way" and as "The Most Beautiful Train In America!"

The last ten Brooks/ALCO class P-5 Pacific engines were delivered to the C&A in 1913. Two six-car train sets were re-equipped in 1924 at a cost of $1 million. The 90-foot "Chicago" observation parlor car included a Japanese tea room and a library. With its blended red color scheme, it was billed, "The Handsomest Train In The World."

=== Gulf, Mobile & Ohio ===
The Pacific-pulled heavyweight consists were still in operation as late as 1947, though C&A was acquired that year by the Gulf, Mobile & Ohio Railroad (GM&O). The GM&O replaced the Pacific engines with diesel-electric engines, and replaced the heavyweight consist with lightweight, streamlined cars from American Car and Foundry. GM&O adopted a variation of the Alton Limited's maroon and red livery for its own streamliners.

The GM&O dropped "Alton" from the train's name in 1958 and it was known as the Limited thereafter.

=== Amtrak ===
When Amtrak (the National Railroad Passenger Corporation) assumed railroad passenger operations in May 1971, it initially retained the service and the name (The Limited), with its Abraham Lincoln (which it also carried over from the GM&O) running along the same route. However, by November of that year Amtrak extended the Limited (as well as the Abraham Lincoln) north to Milwaukee, Wisconsin and renamed it the Prairie State. Eventually, the service was truncated back to Chicago and (after several name variations) became the Lincoln Service.

== Scale models ==
O-scale models of the Alton Limited's Pacifics or passenger cars have been produced at different times by Lionel, MTH, and K-Line. K-Line's 6-car heavyweight set (K-44081) is modeled on the 1924 equipment, and includes the "Armstrong" RPO, No. 707 baggage car, "Webster Groves" coach, "Springfield" diner, "Wilson" parlor, and "Chicago" observation, all 18 inches long, or 72' scale.

Rivarossi, of Italy, also produced an HO version of the Alton Limited with both steam (4-6-2 Pacific) and/or diesel (E8/9) power. AHM, and others, distributed Rivarossi products in the U.S. Passenger cars included baggage, coach-Webster Cove, duplex sleeper, Diner-Bloomington and observation-Chicago, all heavyweight cars.
