= 3460 =

3460 may refer to:

- A.D. 3460, a year in the 4th millennium CE
- 3460 BC, a year in the 4th millennium BCE
- 3460, a number in the 3000 (number) range

== Other uses ==
- 3460 Ashkova, an asteroid in the Asteroid Belt, the 3460th asteroid registered
- Texas Farm to Market Road 3460, a state highway
- Santa Fe class 3460, a class of steam locomotive
