= 4-4-6-2 =

Locomotive wheel arrangement

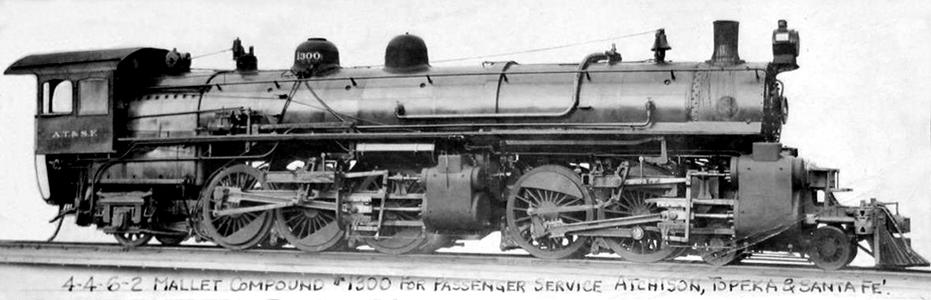
AT&SF locomotive no. 1300, a 4-4-6-2 Mallet type.

Under the Whyte notation for the classification of steam locomotive wheel arrangements, a 4-4-6-2 is a locomotive with four leading wheels, one set of four driving wheels, one set of six driving wheels, and a two trailing wheels.

Other equivalent classifications are:
UIC classification: 2BC1 (also known as German classification and Swiss classification)
Italian and French classification: 220+031
The equivalent UIC classification is refined to (2′B)C1′ for Mallet locomotives.

This wheel arrangement was rare. Two are known to have been built, both as compound Mallet locomotives by Baldwin Locomotive Works in 1909 for the Atchison, Topeka and Santa Fe Railway. They were initially numbered 1300 and 1301 but soon re-numbered 1398 and 1399.

The class was perhaps the first and only attempt in North America to adapt Mallet compounds for passenger service, and were the world's largest passenger locomotives when delivered. With a weight of 376,450 lb (170,750 kg) and 73 in (1.9 m) driving wheels, they exerted 53,000 lbf (240 kN) tractive force. Designed to operate at 36 mph (58 km/h), they achieved 60 mph (97 km/h) in tests. But the experiment was unsuccessful: Adhesion stability was a problem, as the front engine tended to slip uncontrollably due to tractive effort imbalance at passenger-train speeds (which was a common problem with compound Mallets, at any speed much above walking pace). Both locomotives were rebuilt to simple-expansion 4-6-2 engines in 1915 with their original numbers, were still in use as of 1944, and retired by 1950.

A somewhat more successful passenger Mallet design was a Russian 2-4-4-0 built between 1903 and 1909; the last examples were used into the 1950s.
