= Super C (freight train) =

1960s fast train

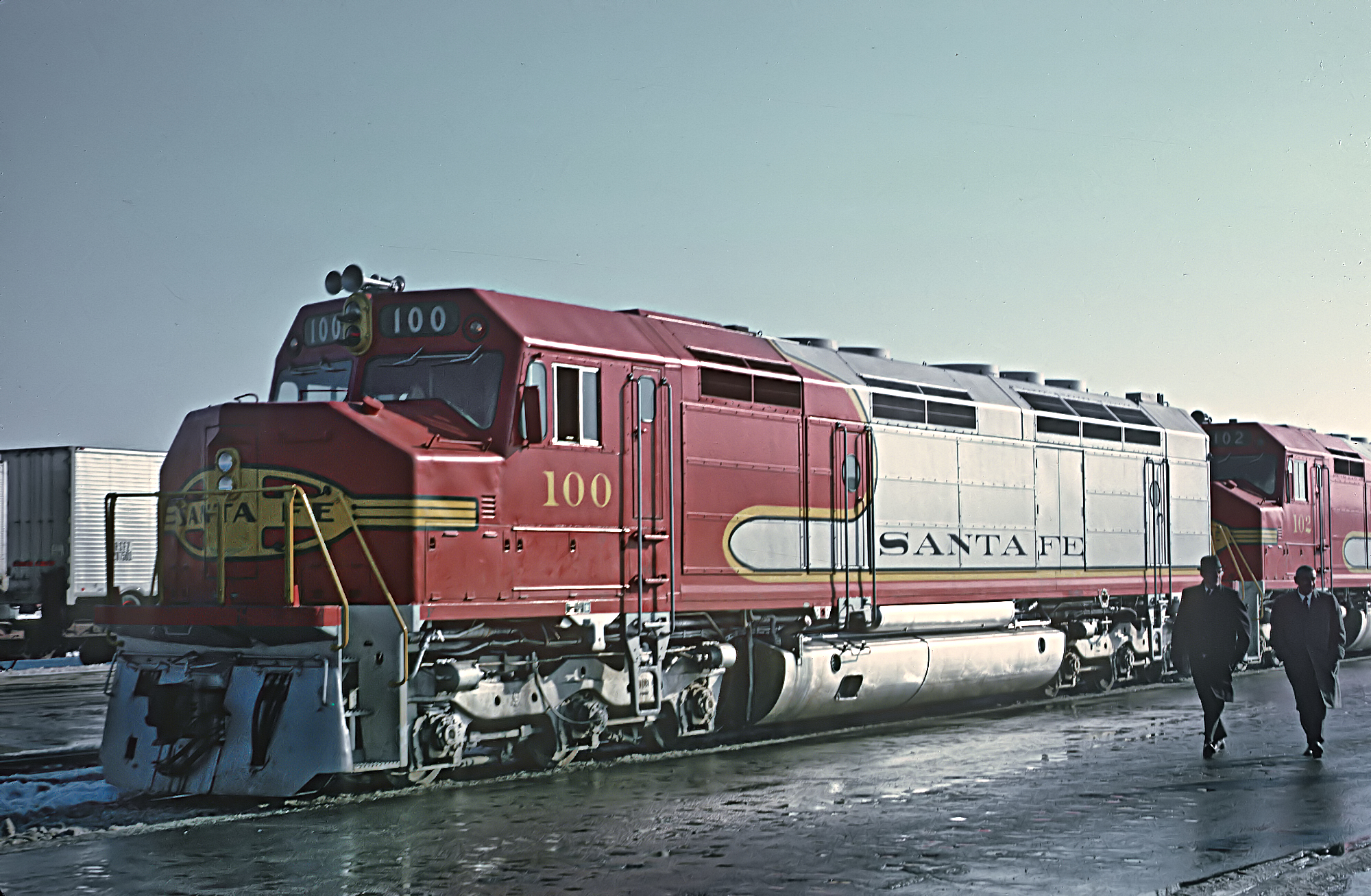
A pair of EMD FP45 locomotives heading the first Super C at Corwith Yard in 1968

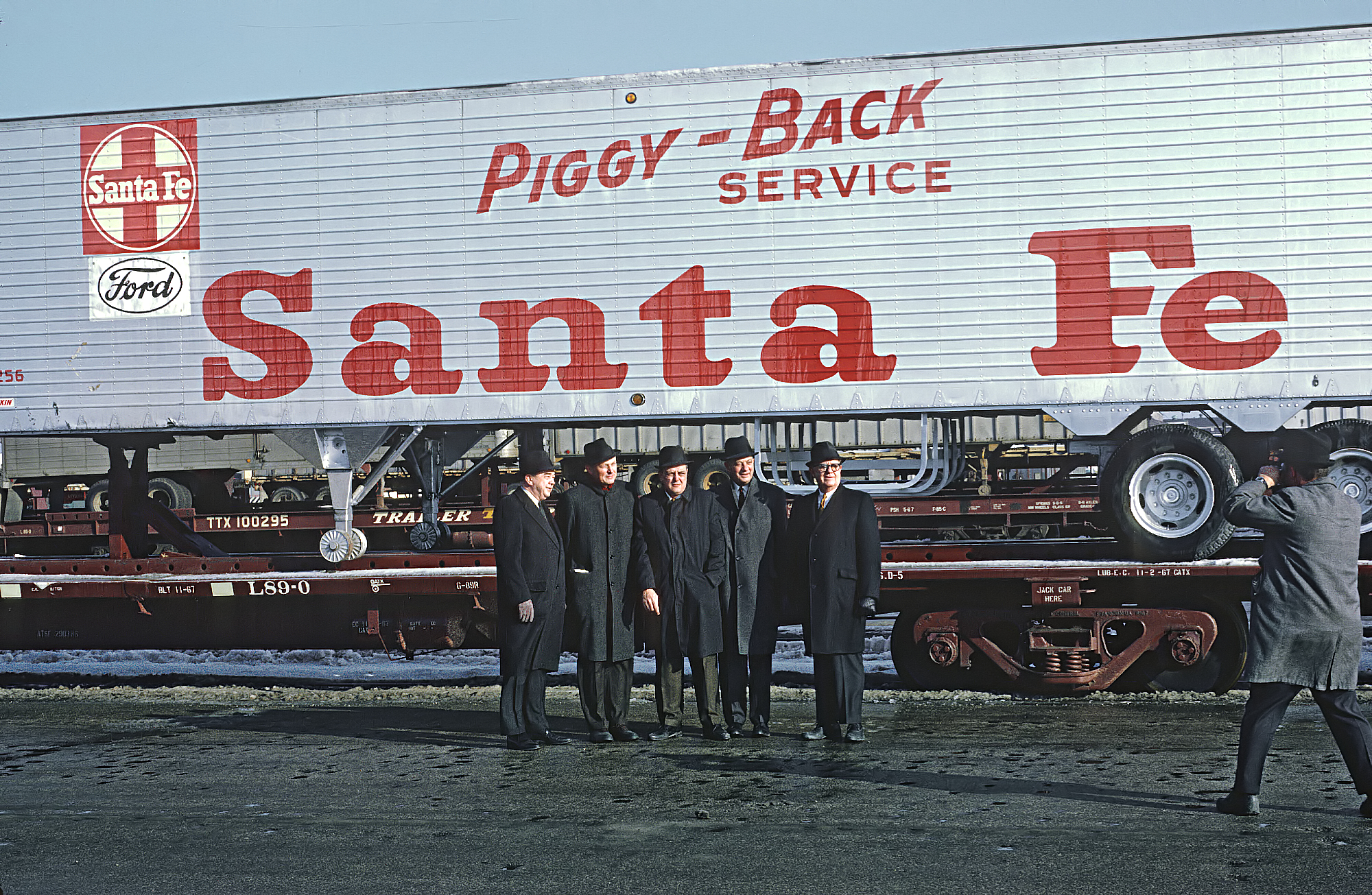
Inauguration of the Super C at Corwith Yard in 1968, ATSF officers in front of a TOFC including John Shedd Reed

The Super C was an American high-speed intermodal freight train on the Atchison, Topeka and Santa Fe Railway from 1968 to 1976. Dubbed the "World's Fastest Freight Train," the all-TOFC (trailer-on-flatcar, or "piggyback") and COFC (container-on-flatcar) train ran about 2,200 miles (3,500 km) between Chicago, Illinois and Los Angeles, California on a 40-hour schedule.

== History ==
The brainchild of company president John Shedd Reed, the Super C (led by a pair of EMD FP45s) made its first run on January 17, 1968, covering the distance in a record-breaking 37½ hours averaging 58.2 miles per hour (93.7 km/h). The second test train did the ride even faster in 34½ hours averaging 63.7 miles per hour (102.5 km/h). For an added fee of $1,400 per trailer shippers were guaranteed fast delivery.

Santa Fe tried high-speed freight operations on its Illinois Division in late 1966. By year's end, passenger-geared GE U28CG locomotives was able to transport 19 piggyback cars from Los Angeles' Hobart Yard to Chicago in 61 hours. On June 8, 1967 a joint run using New York Central's Flexi-Van container cars traveled from New York City to Los Angeles in 54 hours, 21 minutes. The Super C carried high-priority items such as auto parts and electronic components; the United States Post Office soon became a consistent customer. It was allowed 79 miles per hour (127 km/h).

Train length varied from one to 15 or 20 cars. In the end, too few shippers chose to pay for 40-hour delivery, especially considering that a standard TOFC load arrived in 15 hours more. The final blow came in 1976 when the Santa Fe lost its mail contract to a joint venture of the Chicago and North Western Railway and the Union Pacific Railroad that could deliver at lower cost on a 50-hour schedule.

The Super C completed its last trip on May 20, 1976. It was later succeeded by Train 199.
