= Christine Gonzalez =

American train engineer (born 1952/53)

Christine Gonzalez Aldeis (born 1952/1953) is an American train engineer. She became the first woman to work as an engineer on a Class 1 railroad.

Aldeis was born and raised in El Paso, Texas, where she came from a family that had strong ties to the railroad industry. Her grandmother was a Harvey Girl, her grandfather worked as a Pullman conductor, her father worked as a train conductor and her mother was a secretary to the Santa Fe trainmaster in El Paso. Her family was supportive of her announcement to become an engineer and she began training as a hostler in May of 1973. After graduating from simulator school in Topeka, she then started work as the first woman train engineer for the Santa Fe Railway system in February of 1974. She was first assigned to Socorro, New Mexico. Aldeis was featured on the cover of Redbook in March of 1975. In 1980, she met Robert Aldeis and they were married and had two children. Aldeis took some time off to be with her children, but returned to the railroad as part of the reserve board. In 1989, she became a volunteer for Operation Lifesaver. After the BNSF merger, Aldeis became a field safety support manager and later the regional manager. In 2012, she retired from BNSF.
