= Atchison, Topeka and Santa Fe Railway =

US railroad company (1859–1996)

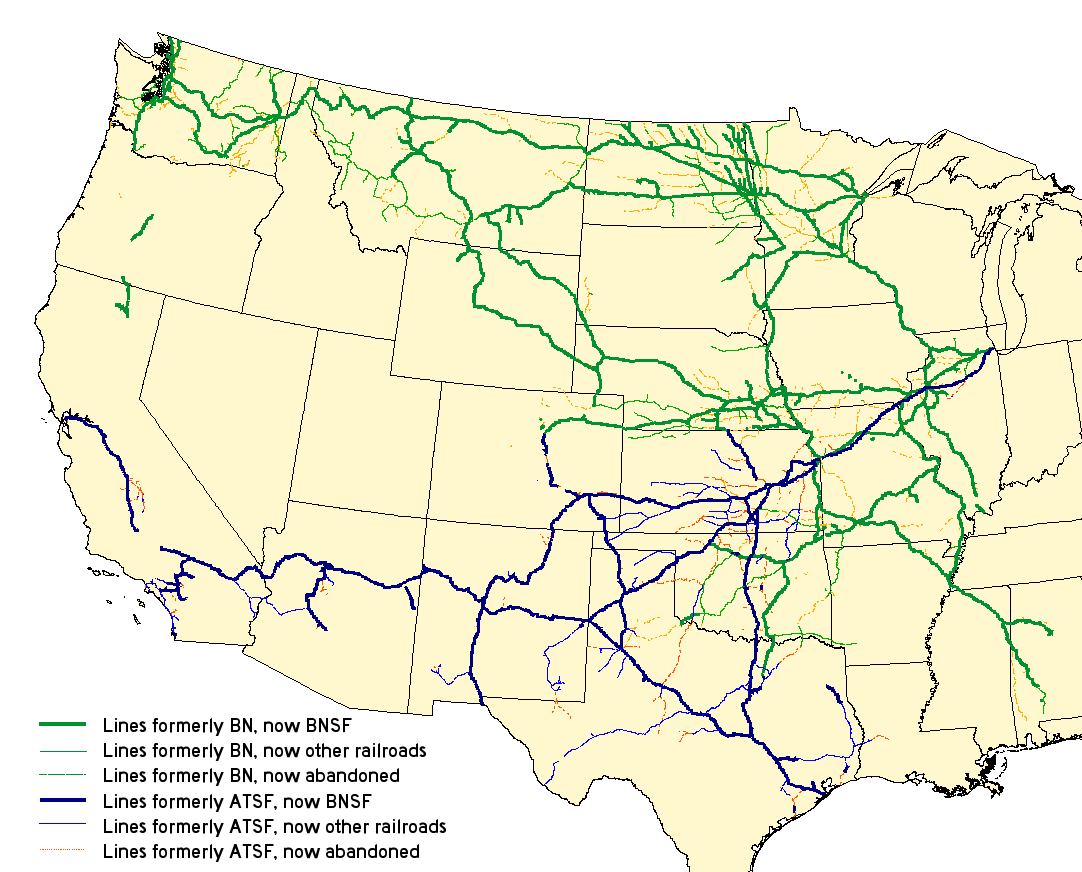
- Santa Fe system (shown in blue) at the time of the BNSF merger

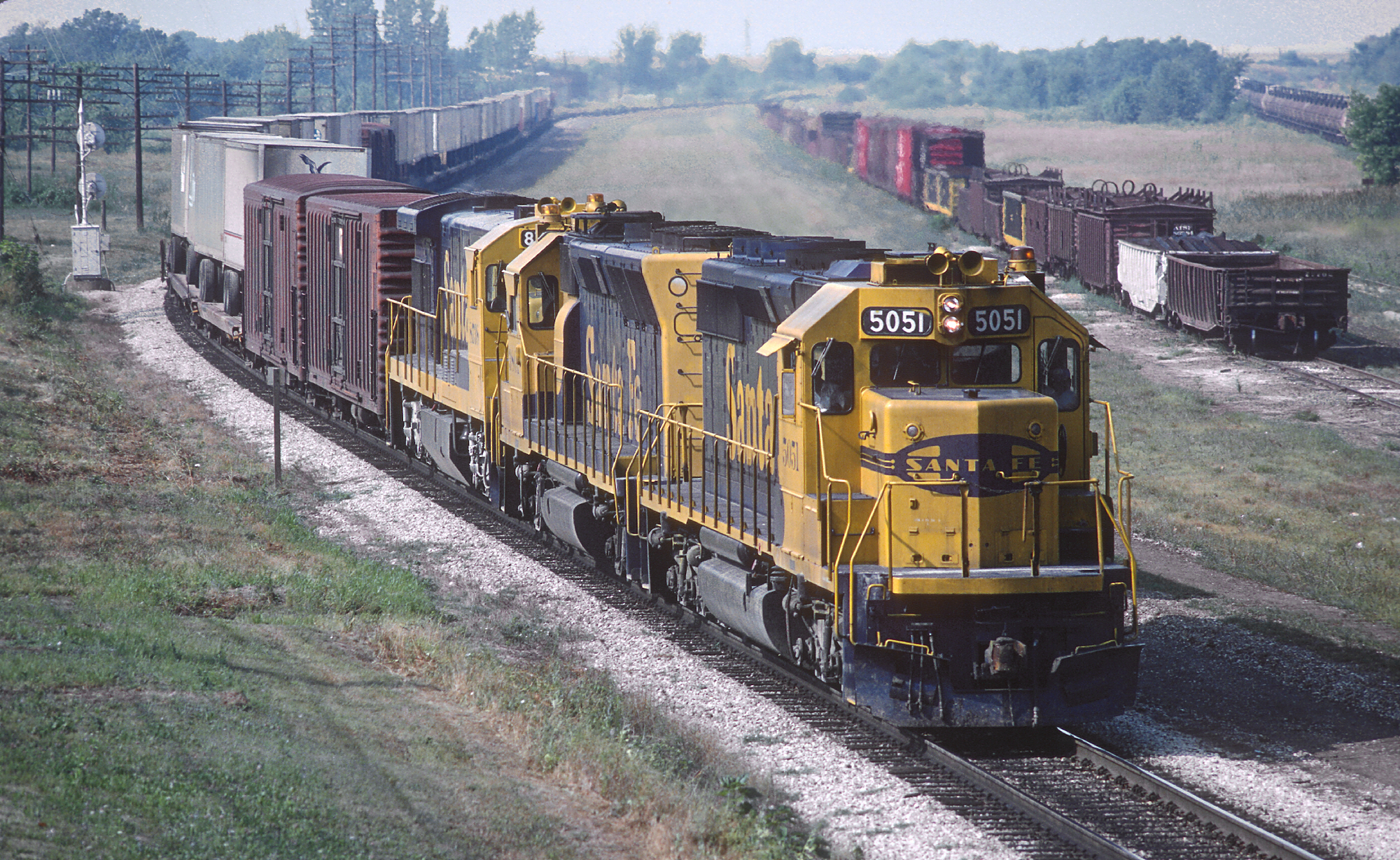
- ATSF #5051, an EMD SD40-2, leads a train through Marceline, Missouri, in August 1983.

Overview
- Headquarters: Chicago, Illinois; Kansas City, Missouri; Los Angeles, California
- Reporting mark: ATSF
- Locale: List: Arizona California Colorado Illinois Iowa Kansas Louisiana Missouri Nebraska New Mexico Oklahoma Texas
- Founder: Cyrus K. Holliday
- Dates of operation: 1859–1996
- Successor: BNSF Railway

Technical
- Track gauge: 4 ft 8 1/2 in (1,435 mm) standard gauge
- Length: 13,115 miles (21,107 km)

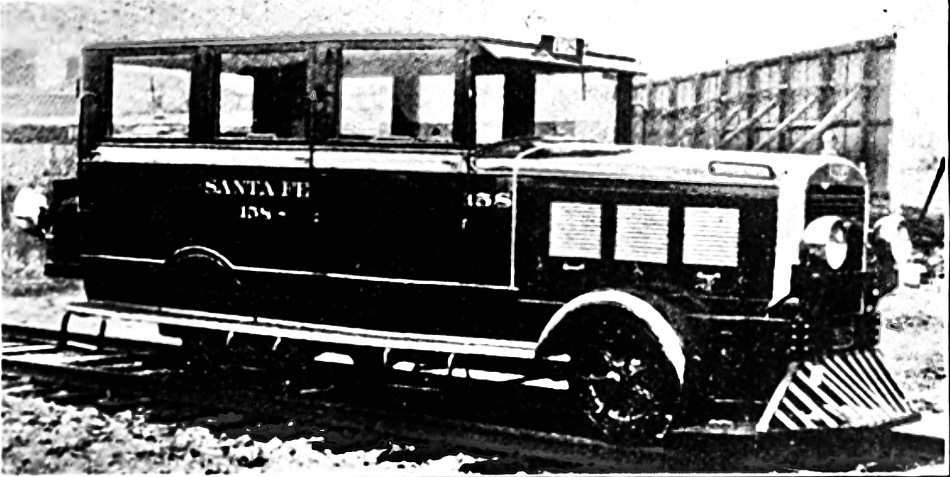
Buda No. 619 rail bus used on the route from Harvey, Illinois, to Topeka

The Atchison, Topeka and Santa Fe Railway (reporting mark ATSF), often referred to as the Santa Fe or AT&SF, was one of the largest Class 1 railroads in the United States between 1859 and 1996.

The Santa Fe was a pioneer in intermodal freight transport; at various times, it operated an airline, the short-lived Santa Fe Skyway, and the Santa Fe Railroad tugboats. Its bus line extended passenger transportation to areas not accessible by rail, and ferryboats on the San Francisco Bay allowed travelers to complete their westward journeys to the Pacific Ocean. The AT&SF was the subject of a popular song, Harry Warren and Johnny Mercer's "On the Atchison, Topeka and the Santa Fe", written for the film The Harvey Girls (1946).

The railroad officially ceased independent operations on December 31, 1996, when it merged with the Burlington Northern Railroad to form the Burlington Northern and Santa Fe Railway.

== History ==
=== Atchison, Topeka & Santa Fe Railway ===
The railroad was chartered in February 1859 to serve the cities of Atchison and Topeka, Kansas, and Santa Fe, New Mexico. The railroad reached the Kansas–Colorado border in 1873 and Pueblo, Colorado, in 1876. To create a demand for its services, the railroad set up real estate offices and sold farmland from the land grants that it was awarded by Congress for laying track.

As the railroad was first being built, many of the tracks were laid directly over the wagon ruts of the Santa Fe Trail. In 1869, the first general office building of the company was built in Topeka. This building also served as a passenger station and freight depot. When the line was extended to Newton, Kansas in 1871, the railroad became a major cattle shipper to ensure a steady revenue stream, at the end of Texas cattle drive trails.

Despite being chartered to serve the city, the railroad chose to bypass Santa Fe, due to the engineering challenges of the mountainous terrain. In 1880, a branch line from Lamy, New Mexico, brought the Santa Fe railroad the 20 miles to its namesake city. It continued to connect with the Southern Pacific at Deming.

The system was eventually expanded with branch lines into California, Arizona, Texas, New Mexico, Colorado, Kansas, Missouri, Oklahoma, Louisiana, and Illinois. It reached Arizona and California by acquiring control of the western portion of the Atlantic and Pacific Railroad in 1880. It reached Chicago by acquiring the Chicago and St. Louis Railway in 1887. By 1887 the mainline had been completed from Chicago to Los Angeles, making it one of the country’s most important railroads and one of the few that directly connected the Midwest with the Gulf of Mexico and the Pacific Ocean under one corporation. The principal lines consisted of:

- Chicago to Kansas City to La Junta, Colorado, to Los Angeles;
- Emporia, Kansas, to Oklahoma City to Fort Worth to Houston;
- Emporia, Kansas, to Dalies, New Mexico;
- Barstow to Richmond, California (the Valley Division);
- Temple to Farwell, Texas;
- Denver to La Junta, Colorado;
- Albuquerque, New Mexico, to El Paso, Texas;
- Dallas to Presidio, Texas; and
- Kansas City to Tulsa.

The primary back shops at Topeka, Kansas, were first established in the 1860s. The original shops were relocated in 1878 to the south side of Seward Avenue and expanded in 1902 to double the repair capacity. The shops at Albuquerque, New Mexico, were built in 1880 and materially expanded in 1925. Another shop site was established at San Bernardino, California, in 1886. To maintain rolling stock in the state of Texas, a fourth major shop facility was built in Cleburne, Texas, in 1899.

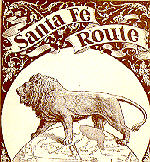
An AT&SF trademark in the late 19th century incorporated the British lion out of respect for the country's financial assistance in building the railroad to California.

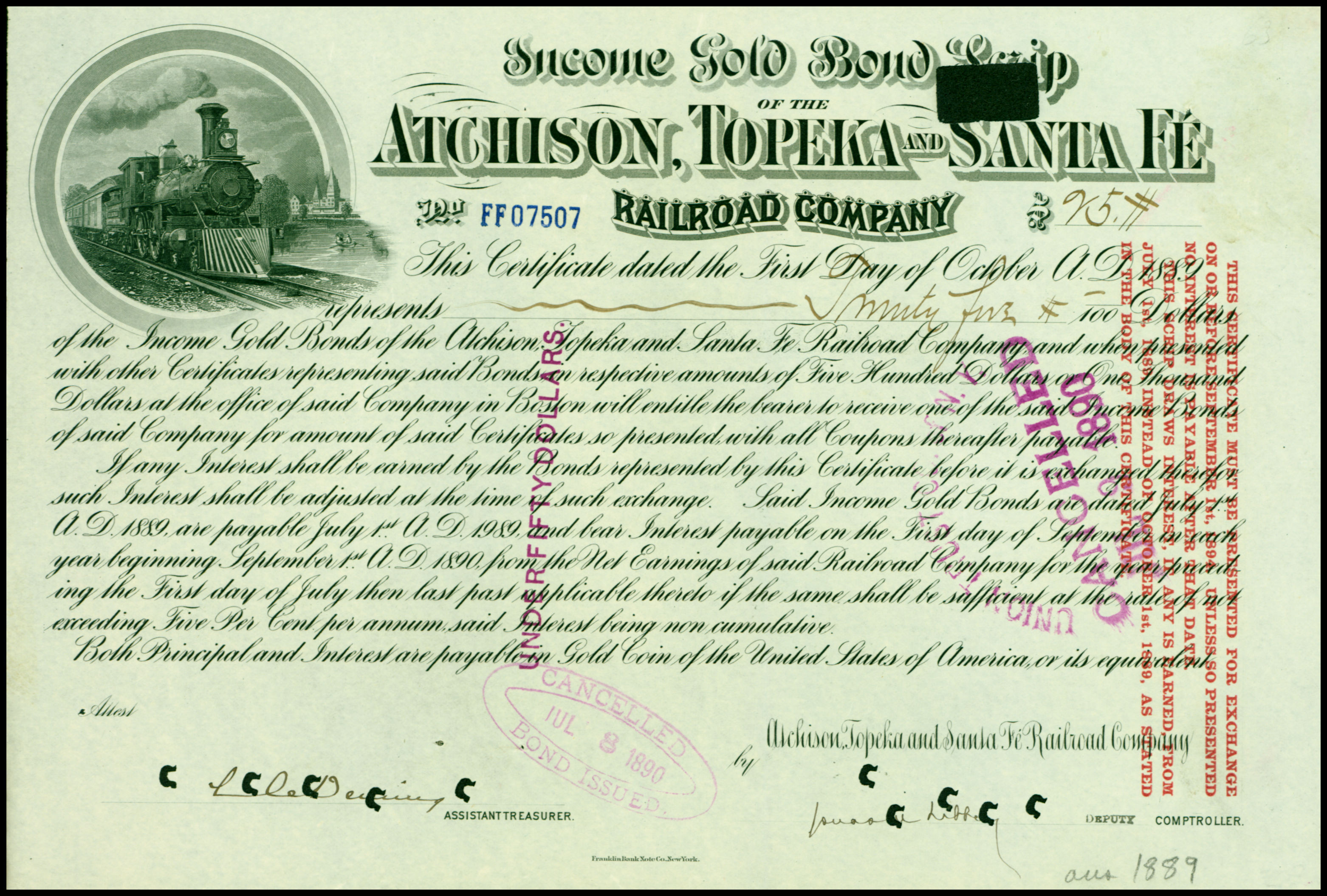
Gold bond of the Atchison, Topeka and Santa Fe Railroad Company, issued October 1, 1889

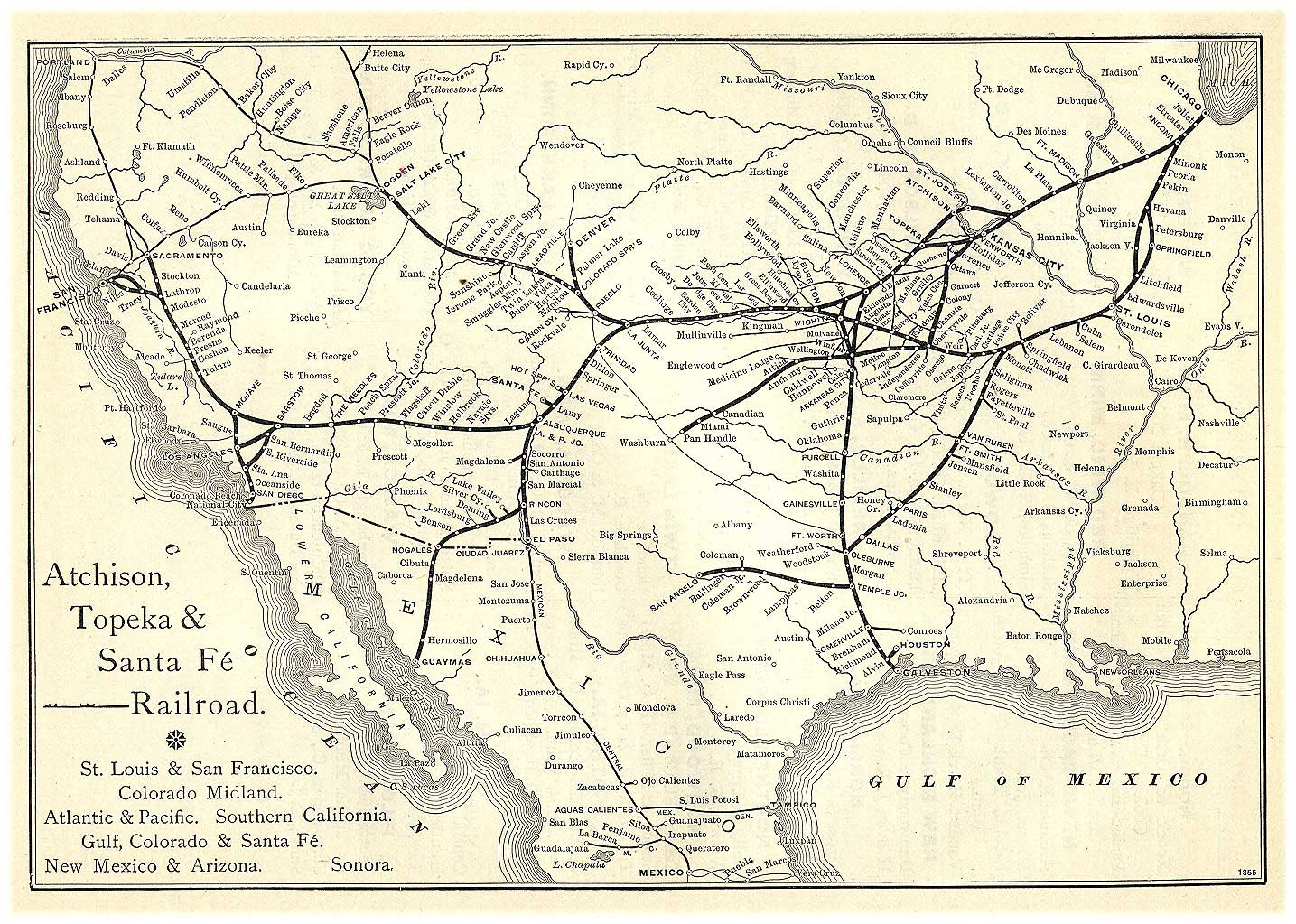
A map of "The Santa Fé Route" and subsidiary lines, as published in an 1891 issue of the Grain Dealers and Shippers Gazetteer

Physical confrontations led to two years of armed conflict that became known as the Royal Gorge Railroad War. Federal intervention prompted an out-of-court settlement on February 2, 1880, in the form of the so-called "Treaty of Boston", wherein the Denver & Rio Grande railroad was allowed to complete its line and lease it for use by the Santa Fe railroad.

Building across Kansas and eastern Colorado was simple, with few natural obstacles, but the railroad found it almost economically impossible because of the sparse population. It set up real estate offices in the area and promoted settlement across Kansas on the land granted to it by Congress in 1863.

The Santa Fe entered Texas by starting what became the Panhandle and Santa Fe Railway in 1886 and acquiring the Gulf, Colorado and Santa Fe Railway in 1887. The Santa Fe reached San Francisco by buying the San Francisco & San Joaquin Valley Railway in 1891. They completed a Grand Canyon branch in 1901. The Santa Fe acquired the properties of the Southern California Railway in 1906. They acquired a Phoenix branch with the purchase of the Santa Fe, Prescott and Phoenix Railway in 1911.

=== Expansion ===
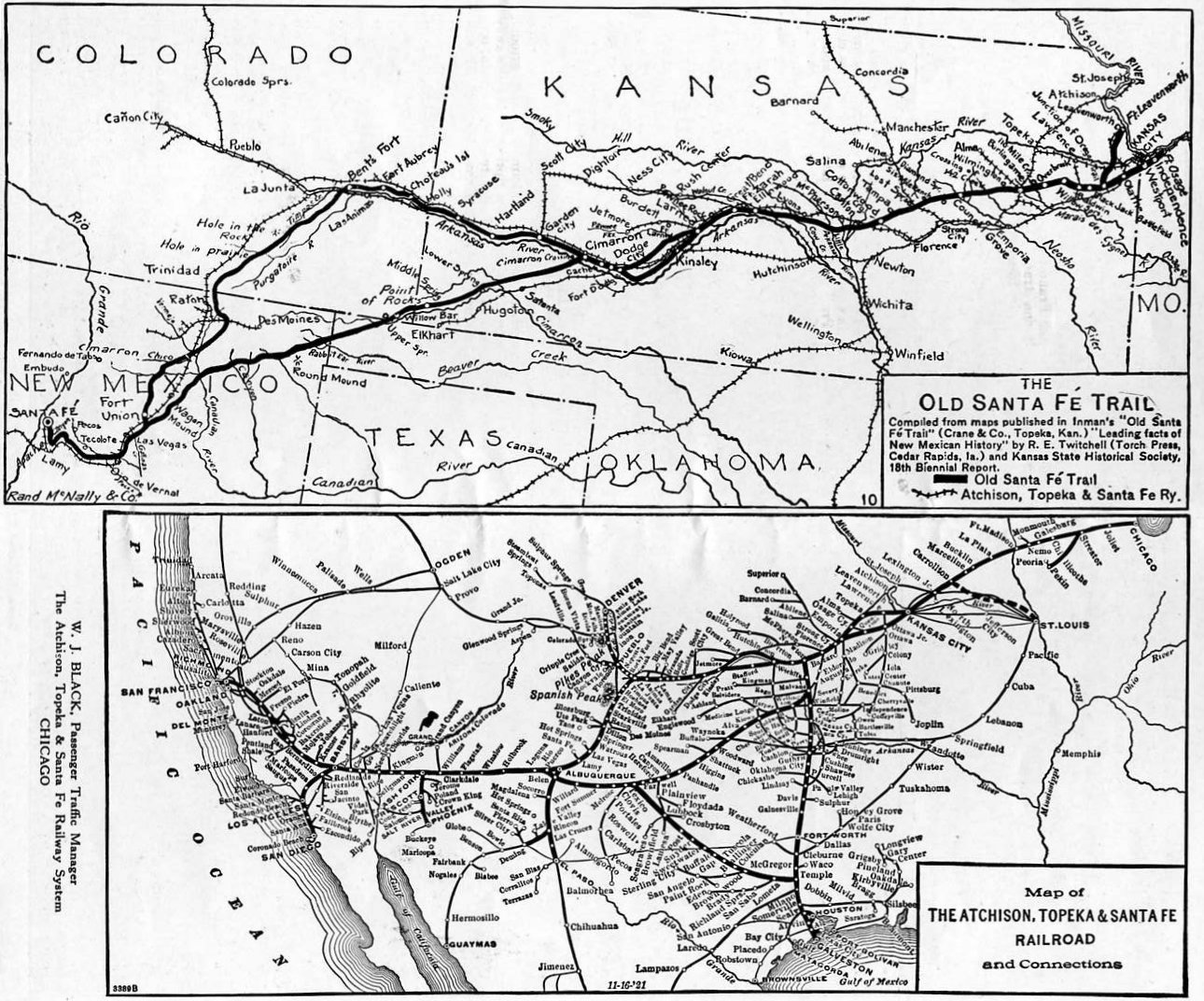
A comparison map prepared by the Santa Fe Railroad in 1921, showing the "Old Santa Fé Trail" (top) and the AT&SF and its connections (bottom)

In 1928, the Santa Fe acquired the Kansas City, Mexico and Orient Railway.

On March 29, 1955, the railway was one of many companies that sponsored attractions in Disneyland with its five-year sponsorship of all Disneyland trains and stations until 1974.

In 1960, AT&SF bought the Toledo, Peoria & Western Railroad (TP&W); then sold a half-interest to the Pennsylvania Railroad (PRR). The TP&W cut straight east across Illinois from near Fort Madison, Iowa (Lomax, IL), to a connection with the PRR at Effner, Indiana (Illinois–Indiana border), forming a bypass around Chicago for traffic moving between the two lines. The TP&W route did not mesh with the traffic patterns Conrail developed after 1976, so AT&SF bought back the other half, merged the TP&W in 1983, then sold it back into independence in 1989.

=== Attempted Southern Pacific merger ===
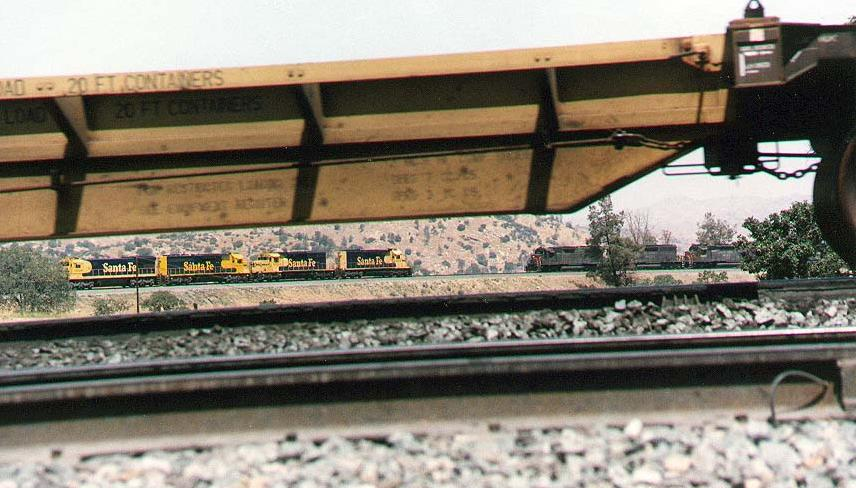
AT&SF and SP freight trains meet at Walong on the Tehachapi Loop in the late 1980s.

AT&SF began merger talks in the 1980s. The Southern Pacific Santa Fe Railroad (SPSF) was a proposed merger between the parent companies of the Southern Pacific and AT&SF announced on December 23, 1983. As part of the joining of the two firms, all rail and non-rail assets owned by Santa Fe Industries and the Southern Pacific Transportation Company were placed under the control of a holding company, the Santa Fe–Southern Pacific Corporation. The merger was subsequently denied by the Interstate Commerce Commission (ICC) on the basis that it would create too many duplicate routes.

The companies were so confident the merger would be approved that they began repainting locomotives and non-revenue rolling stock in a new unified paint scheme. While Southern Pacific (railroad) was sold off to Rio Grande Industries, all of the SP's real estate holdings were consolidated into a new company, Catellus Development Corporation, making it California's largest private landowner, of which Santa Fe remained the owner. In the early 1980s, gold was discovered on several properties west of Battle Mountain, Nevada along I-80, on ground owned by the Santa Fe Railroad (formerly SP). The Santa Fe Pacific Corporation (a name correlation of Santa Fe and Southern Pacific) was to develop the properties. They were sold to Newmont during 1997 in preparation for the merger with Burlington Northern). Sometime later, Catellus would purchase the Union Pacific Railroad's interest in the Los Angeles Union Passenger Terminal (LAUPT).

=== Burlington Northern merger ===
On September 22, 1995, AT&SF merged with Burlington Northern Railroad to form the Burlington Northern & Santa Fe Railway (BNSF). Some of the challenges resulting from the joining of the two companies included the establishment of a common dispatching system, the unionization of AT&SF's non-union dispatchers, and incorporating AT&SF's train identification codes throughout. The two lines maintained separate operations until December 31, 1996, when it officially became BNSF.

	1870	1945
Gross operating revenue	$182,580	$528,080,530
Total track length	62 miles (100 km)	13,115 miles (21,107 km)
Freight carried	98,920 tons	59,565,100 tons
Passengers carried	33,630	11,264,000
Locomotives owned	6	1,759
Unpowered rolling stock owned	141	81,974 freight cars 1,436 passenger cars

Source: Santa Fe Railroad (1945), Along Your Way, Rand McNally, Chicago, Illinois.

Revenue Freight Ton-Miles (Millions)
	ATSF/GC&SF/P&SF	Oklahoma City-Ada-Atoka	FtWorth & Rio Grande	KCM&O/KCM&O of Texas	Clinton & Oklahoma Western	New Mexico Central
1925	13,862	14	42	330	2	1
1933	8,712	12	18	(incl P&SF)	(incl P&SF)	(incl ATSF)
1944	37,603	45	(incl GC&SF)			
1960	36,635	20				
1970	48,328	(merged)				

Revenue Passenger-Miles (Millions)
	ATSF/GC&SF/P&SF	Oklahoma City-Ada-Atoka	FtWorth & Rio Grande	KCM&O/KCM&O of Texas	Clinton & Oklahoma Western	New Mexico Central
1925	1,410	5	6	8	0.1	0.1
1933	555	0.1	0.8	(incl P&SF)	(incl P&SF)	(incl ATSF)
1944	6,250	0.2	(incl GC&SF)			
1960	1,689	0				
1970	727	(merged)				

== Company officers ==
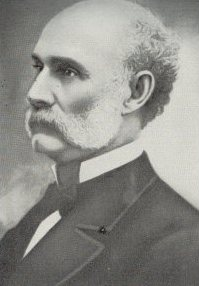
Cyrus K. Holliday, first president of AT&SF

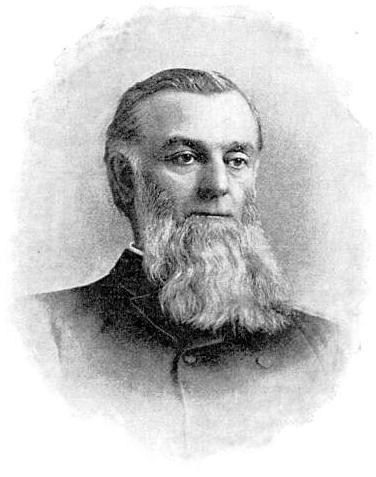
William Barstow Strong, president 1881–1889

- Cyrus K. Holliday: 1860–1863
- Samuel C. Pomeroy: 1863–1868
- William F. Nast: September 1868
- Henry C. Lord: 1868–1869
- Henry Keyes: 1869–1870
- Ginery Twichell: 1870–1873
- Henry Strong: 1873–1874
- Thomas Nickerson: 1874–1880
- T. Jefferson Coolidge: 1880–1881
- William Barstow Strong: 1881–1889
- Allen Manvel: 1889–1893
- Joseph Reinhart: 1893–1894
- Aldace F. Walker: 1894–1895
- Edward Payson Ripley: 1896–1920
- William Benson Storey: 1920–1933
- Samuel T. Bledsoe: 1933–1939
- Edward J. Engel: 1939–1944
- Fred G. Gurley: 1944–1958
- Ernest S. Marsh: 1958–1967
- John Shedd Reed: 1967–1978
- Lawrence Cena; 1978–1985
- W. John Swartz: 1985–1988
- Mike Haverty: 1989–1991
- Robert Krebs: 1991–1995

== Passenger service ==
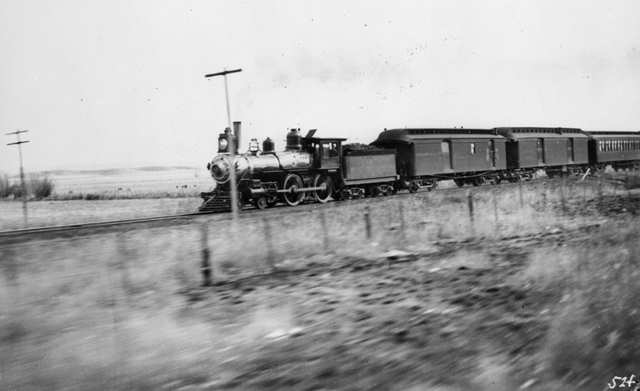
A 4-4-0 steam engine leading an AT&SF passenger train in Kansas, c. 1895

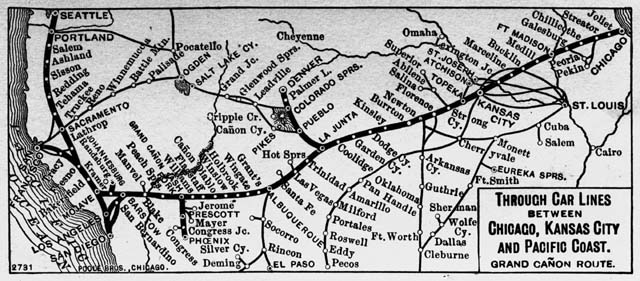
A map depicting the "Grand Canyon Route", c. 1901

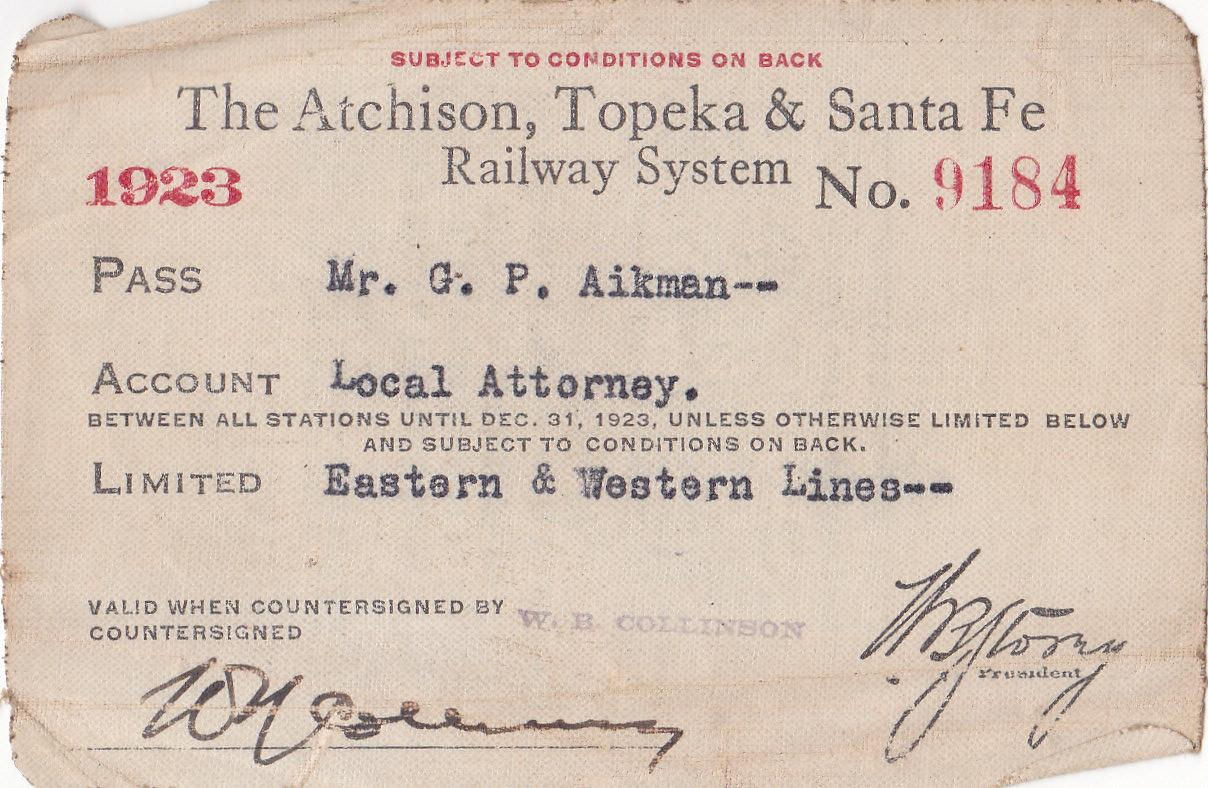
An AT&SF pass from 1923

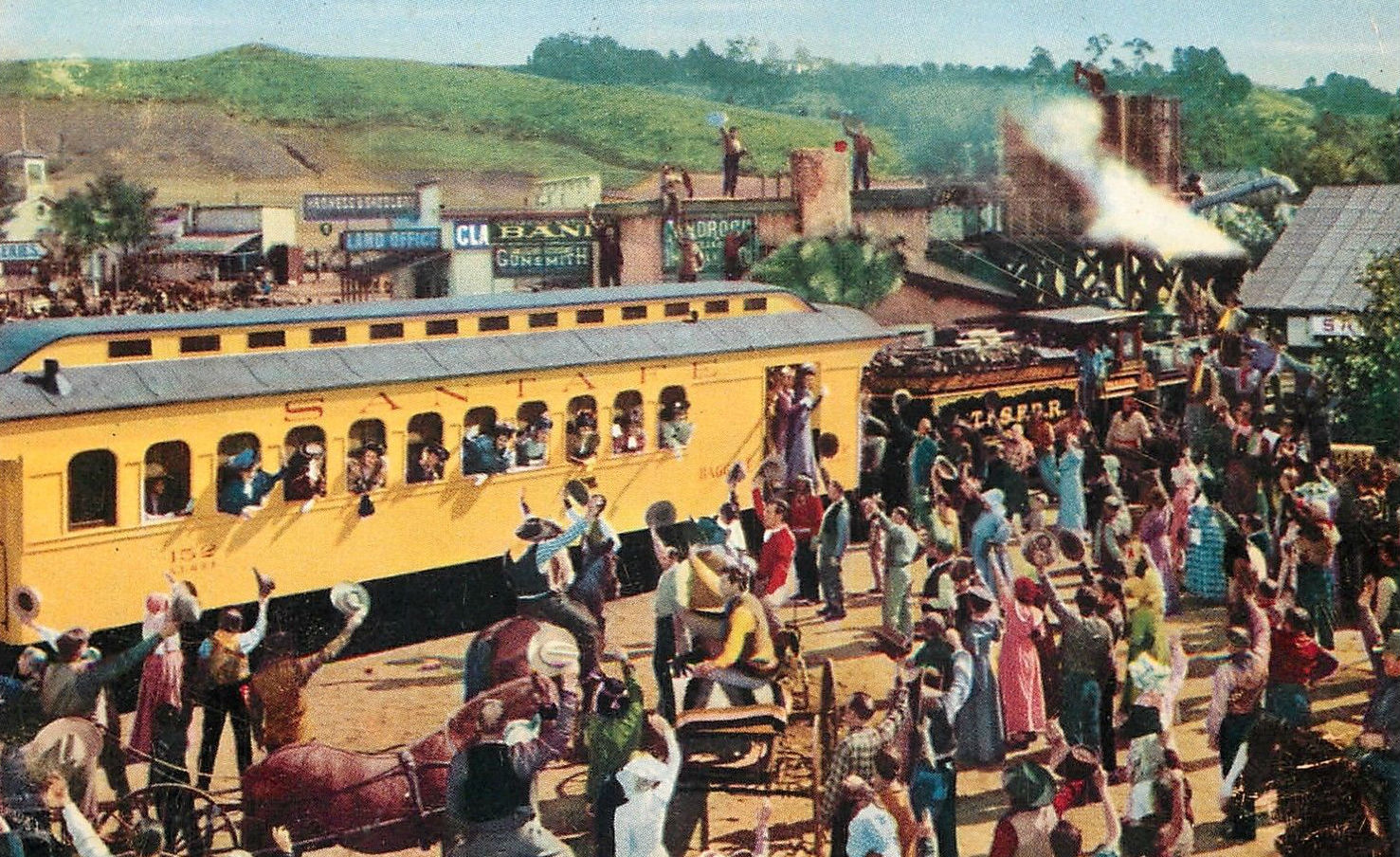
A scene from the filming of The Harvey Girls (1946)

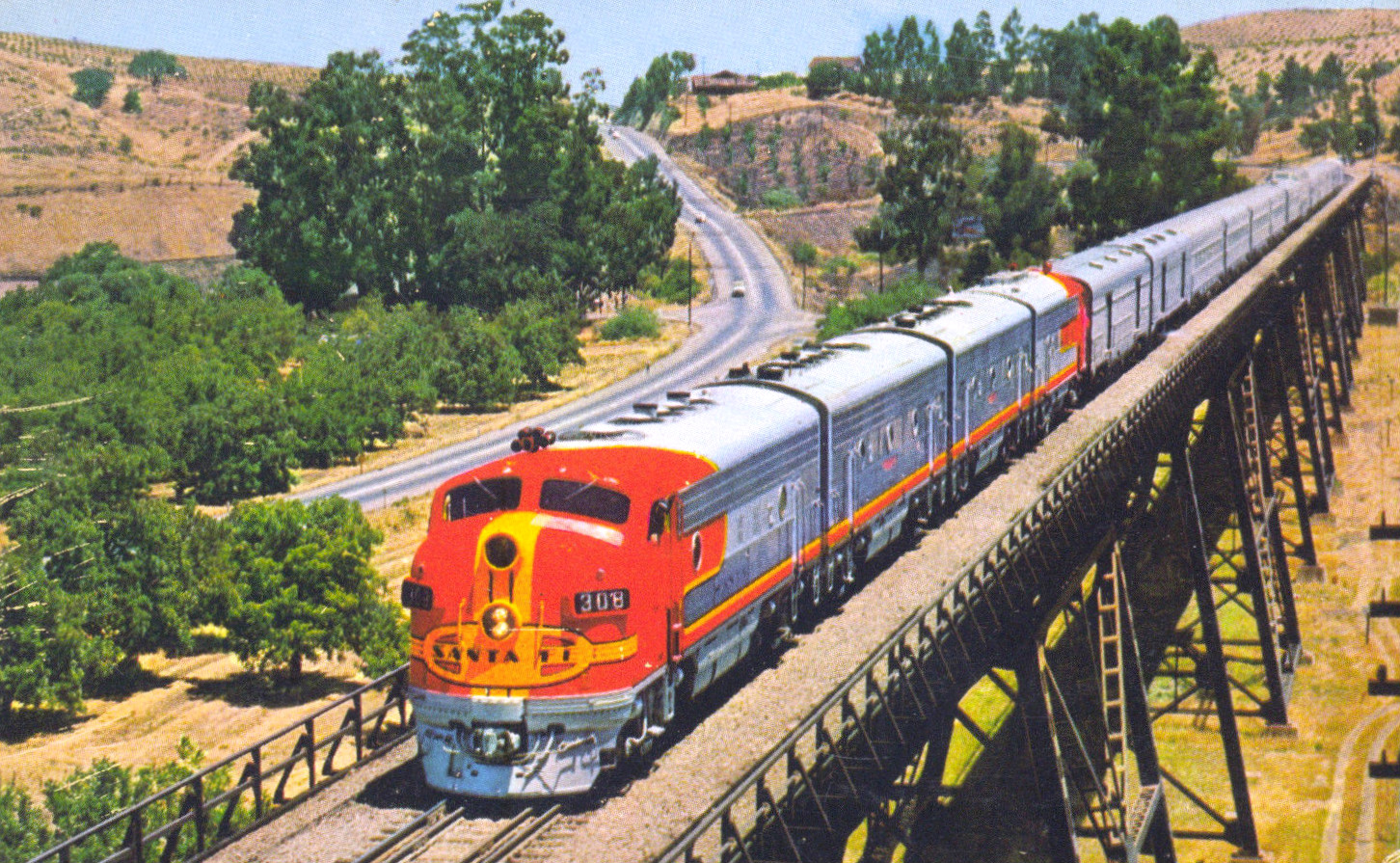
The San Francisco Chief crossing the Muir Trestle in the 1950s

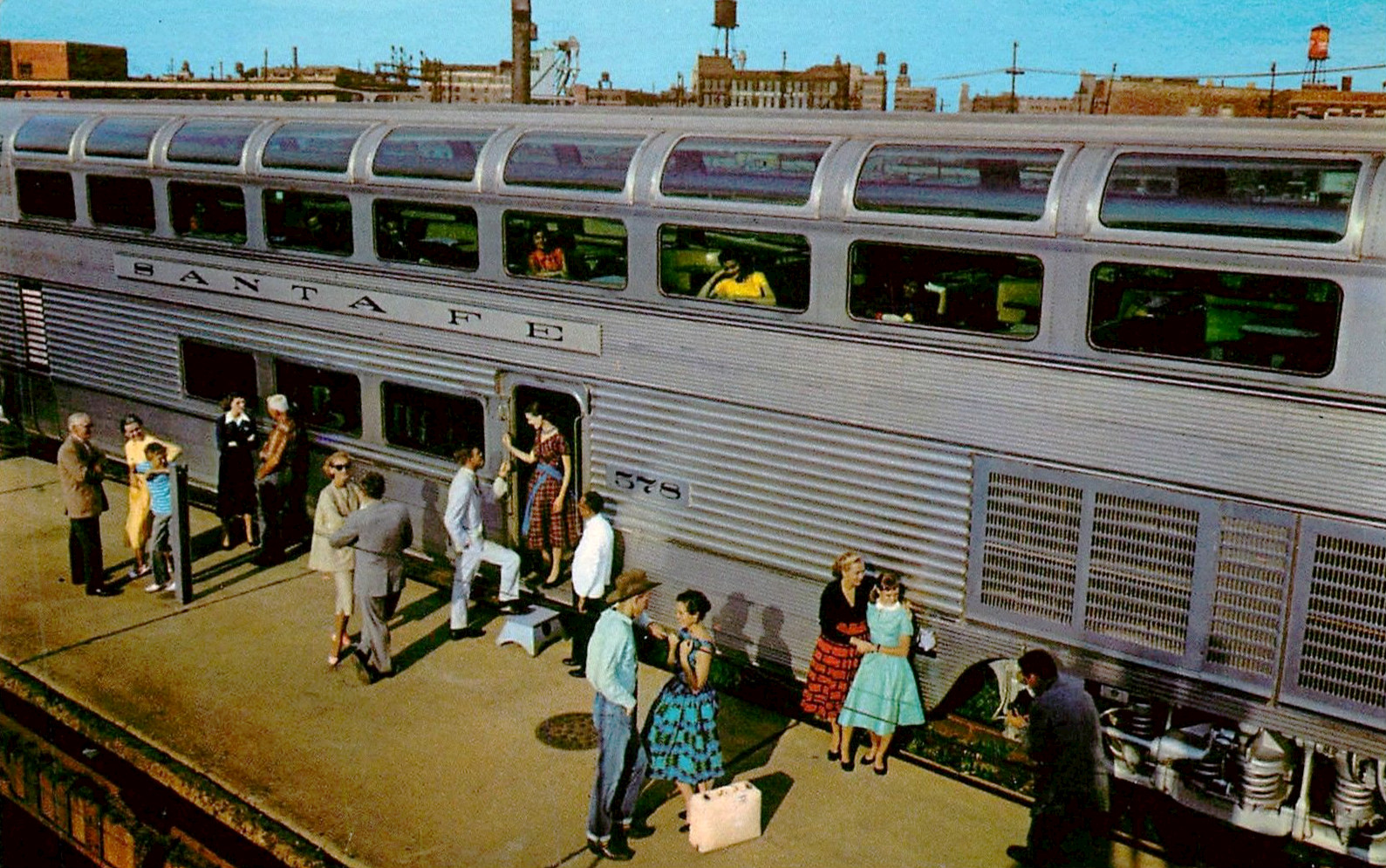
The exterior of a Hi-Level lounge on the El Capitan soon after the car's completion in 1956

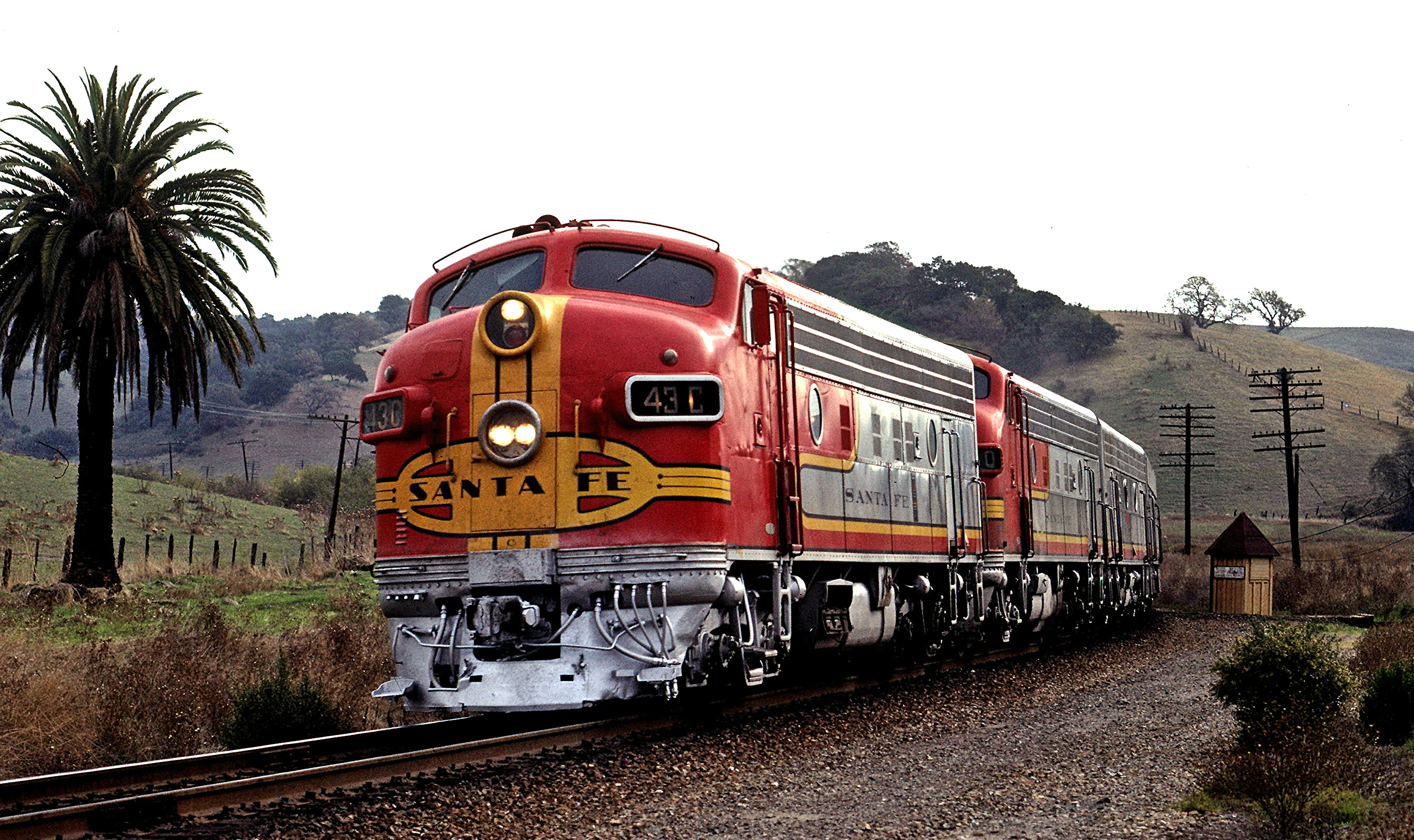
AT&SF EMD F7s in the classic Warbonnet livery, leading the San Diegan, heading south near Miramar, California, in 1973

The AT&SF was widely known for its passenger train service in the first half of the 20th century. AT&SF introduced many innovations in passenger rail travel, among these the "Pleasure Domes" of the Super Chief (billed as the "...only dome car[s] between Chicago and Los Angeles" when they were introduced in 1951) and the "Big Dome" Lounge cars and double-decker Hi-Level cars of the El Capitan, which entered revenue service in 1954. The railroad was among the first to add dining cars to its passenger trains, a move which began in 1891, following the examples of the Northern Pacific and Union Pacific railroads. The AT&SF offered food on board in a dining car or at one of the many Harvey House restaurants that were strategically located throughout the system.

In general, the same train name was used for both directions of a particular train. The exceptions to this rule included the Chicagoan and Kansas Cityan trains (both names referred to the same service, but the Chicagoan was the eastbound version, while the Kansas Cityan was the westbound version), and the Eastern Express and West Texas Express. All AT&SF trains that terminated in Chicago did so at Dearborn Station. Trains terminating in Los Angeles arrived at AT&SF's La Grande Station until May 1939, when Los Angeles Union Passenger Terminal was opened.

The Santa Fe was the only railroad to run trains from Chicago to California on its own tracks. The railway's extensive network was also home to a number of regional services. These generally did not have the size of the transcontinental trains, but established reputations of their own. Of these, the Chicago-Texas trains were notable. The San Diegans, which ran from Los Angeles to San Diego, had the highest ridership and longevity, becoming to the Santa Fe what New York City-Philadelphia trains were to the Pennsylvania Railroad. But Santa Fe trains also served Tulsa, Oklahoma, El Paso, Texas, Phoenix, Arizona (the Hassayampa Flyer), and Denver, Colorado, among other cities not on their main line.

To reach smaller communities, the railroad operated mixed (passenger and freight) trains or gas-electric doodlebug rail cars. The latter were later converted to diesel power, and one pair of Budd Rail Diesel Cars was eventually added. After World War II, Santa Fe Trailways buses replaced most of these lesser trains. These smaller trains generally were not named; only the train numbers were used to differentiate services.

The ubiquitous passenger service inspired the title of the 1946 Academy-Award-winning Harry Warren tune "On the Atchison, Topeka and the Santa Fe." The song was written in 1945 for the film The Harvey Girls, a story about the waitresses of the Fred Harvey Company's restaurants. It was sung in the film by Judy Garland and recorded by many other singers, including Bing Crosby. In the 1970s, the railroad used Crosby's version in a commercial.

AT&SF ceased operating passenger trains on May 1, 1971, when it conveyed its remaining trains to Amtrak. These included the Super Chief / El Capitan, the Texas Chief and the San Diegan (though Amtrak reduced the San Diegan from three daily round trips to two). Discontinued were the San Francisco Chief, the ex-Grand Canyon, the Tulsan, and a Denver–La Junta local. ATSF had been more than willing to retain the San Diegan and its famed Chiefs. However, any railroad that opted out of Amtrak would have been required to operate all of its passenger routes until at least 1976. The prospect of having to keep operating its less-successful routes, especially the money-bleeding 23/24 (the former Grand Canyon) led ATSF to get out of passenger service altogether.

Amtrak still runs the Super Chief and San Diegan today as the Southwest Chief and Pacific Surfliner, respectively, although the original routes and equipment have been modified by Amtrak.

=== Named trains ===
AT&SF operated the following named trains on regular schedules:

- The Angel: San Francisco, California – Los Angeles, California – San Diego, California (this was the southbound version of the Saint)
- The Angelo: San Angelo, Texas – Fort Worth, Texas (on the GC&SF)
- The Antelope: Oklahoma City, Oklahoma – Kansas City, Missouri
- Atlantic Express: Los Angeles, California – Kansas City, Missouri (this was the eastbound version of the Los Angeles Express).
- California Express: Chicago, Illinois – Kansas City, Missouri – Los Angeles, California
- California Fast Mail: Chicago, Illinois – Los Angeles, California – San Francisco, California
- California Limited: Chicago, Illinois – Los Angeles, California
- California Special: Clovis, New Mexico – Houston, Texas (with through connections to California via the San Francisco Chief at Clovis)
- Cavern: Clovis, New Mexico – Carlsbad, New Mexico (connected with the Scout).
- Centennial State: Denver, Colorado – Chicago, Illinois
- Central Texas Express: Sweetwater, Texas – Lubbock, Texas
- Chicagoan: Kansas City, Missouri – Chicago, Illinois (this was the eastbound version of the Kansas Cityan passenger train).
- Chicago Express: Newton, Kansas – Chicago, Illinois
- Chicago Fast Mail: San Francisco, California – Los Angeles, California – Chicago, Illinois
- Chicago-Kansas City Flyer: Chicago, Illinois – Kansas City, Missouri
- The Chief: Chicago, Illinois – Los Angeles, California
- Eastern Express: Lubbock, Texas – Amarillo, Texas (this was the eastbound version of the West Texas Express).
- El Capitan: Chicago, Illinois – Los Angeles, California
- El Pasoan: El Paso, Texas – Albuquerque, New Mexico
- El Tovar: Los Angeles, California – Chicago, Illinois (via Belen)
- Fargo Fast Mail/Express: Belen, New Mexico – Amarillo, Texas – Kansas City, Missouri – Chicago, Illinois
- Fast Fifteen: Newton, Kansas – Galveston, Texas
- Fast Mail Express: San Francisco, California (via Los Angeles) – Chicago, Illinois
- Golden Gate: Oakland, California – Bakersfield, California, with coordinated connecting bus service to Los Angeles and San Francisco
- Grand Canyon Limited: Chicago, Illinois – Los Angeles, California
- Hassayampa Flyer: Phoenix, Arizona – Ash Fork, Arizona (later Williams Junction, Arizona)
- The Hopi: Los Angeles, California – Chicago, Illinois
- Kansas Cityan: Chicago, Illinois – Kansas City, Missouri (this was the westbound version of the Chicagoan passenger train).
- Kansas City Chief: Kansas City, Missouri – Chicago, Illinois
- The Kite-Shaped Track: Los Angeles-area excursion
- Los Angeles Express: Chicago, Illinois – Los Angeles, California (this was the westbound version of the Atlantic Express).
- The Missionary: San Francisco, California – Belen, New Mexico – Amarillo, Texas – Kansas City, Missouri – Chicago, Illinois
- Navajo: Chicago, Illinois – San Francisco, California (via Los Angeles)
- Oil Flyer: Kansas City, Missouri – Tulsa, Oklahoma, with through sleepers to Chicago via other trains
- Overland Limited: Chicago, Illinois – Los Angeles, California
- Phoenix Express: Los Angeles, California – Phoenix, Arizona
- The Ranger: Kansas City, Missouri – Chicago, Illinois
- The Saint: San Diego, California – Los Angeles, California – San Francisco, California (this was the northbound version of the "Angel")
- San Diegan: Los Angeles, California – San Diego, California
- San Francisco Chief: San Francisco, California – Chicago, Illinois
- San Francisco Express: Chicago, Illinois – San Francisco, California (via Los Angeles)
- Santa Fe de Luxe: Chicago, Illinois – Los Angeles, California – San Francisco, California
- Santa Fe Eight: Belen, New Mexico – Amarillo, Texas – Kansas City, Missouri – Chicago, Illinois
- The Scout: Chicago, Illinois – San Francisco, California (via Los Angeles)
- South Plains Express: Sweetwater, Texas – Lubbock, Texas
- Super Chief: Chicago, Illinois – Los Angeles, California
- The Texan: Houston, Texas – New Orleans, Louisiana (on the GC&SF between Galveston and Houston, then via the Missouri Pacific Railroad between Houston and New Orleans).
- Texas Chief: Galveston, Texas (on the GC&SF) – Chicago, Illinois
- Tourist Flyer: Chicago, Illinois – San Francisco, California (via Los Angeles)
- The Tulsan: Tulsa, Oklahoma – Kansas City, Mo. with through coaches to Chicago, Illinois, via other trains (initially the Chicagoan/Kansas Cityan)
- Valley Flyer: Oakland, California – Bakersfield, California
- West Texas Express: Amarillo, Texas – Lubbock, Texas (this was the westbound version of the Eastern Express).

=== Special trains ===
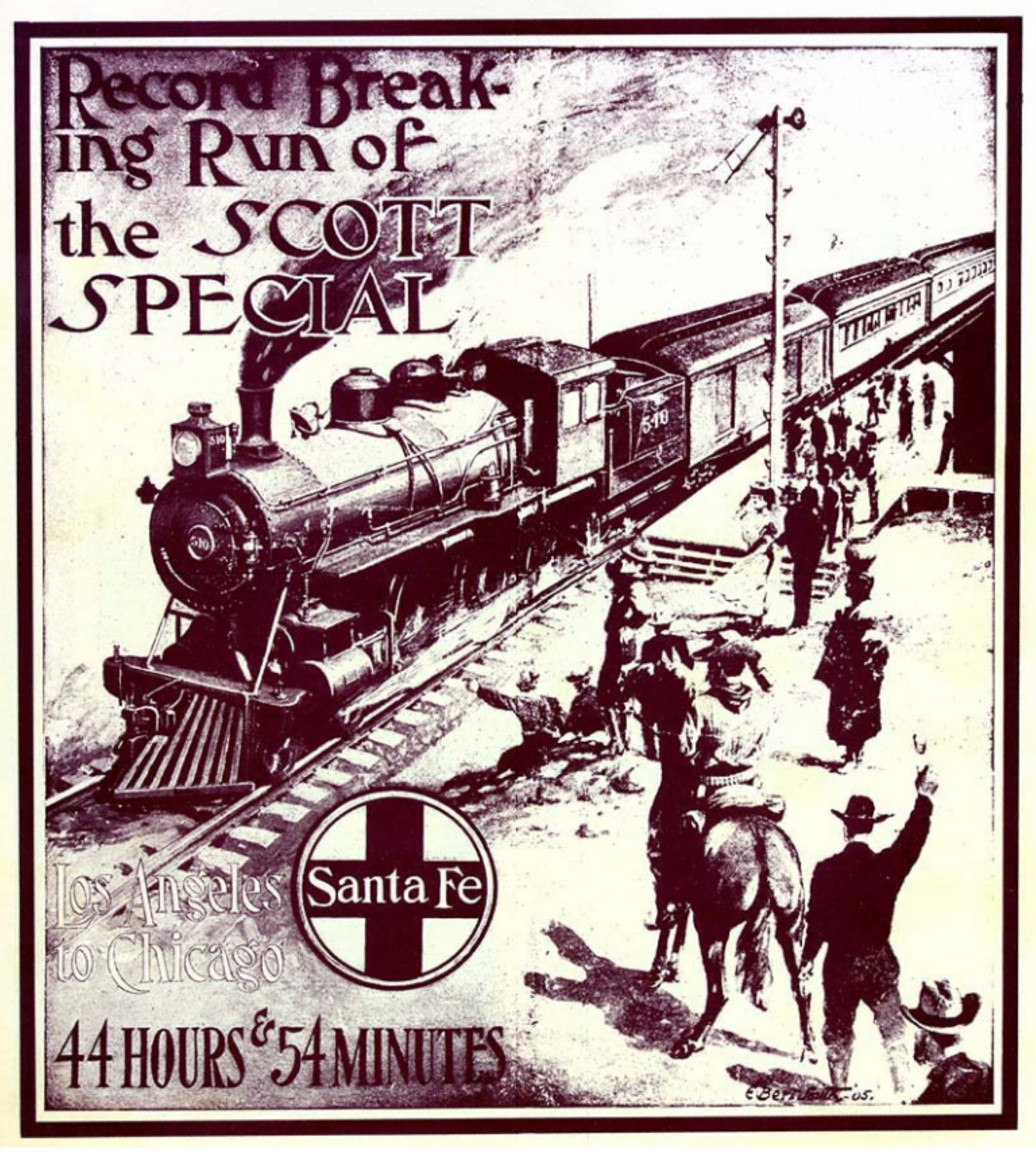
A promotional brochure for the Scott Special passenger train

Occasionally, a special train was chartered to make a high-profile run over the Santa Fe's track. These specials were not included in the railroad's regular revenue service lineup, but were intended as one-time (and usually one-way) traversals of the railroad. Some of the more notable specials include:

- Cheney Special: Colton, California – Chicago, Illinois (a one-time train that ran in 1895 on behalf of B.P. Cheney, a director of the Santa Fe).
- Clarke Special: Winslow, Arizona – Chicago, Illinois (a one-time train that ran in 1904 on behalf of Charles W. Clarke, the son of then-Arizona senator William Andrew Clarke).
- David B. Jones Special: Los Angeles, California – Chicago, Illinois, and on to Lake Forest, Illinois (a one-time, record-breaking train that ran between May 5 to 8, 1923, on behalf of the president of the Mineral Point Zinc Company).
- Huntington Special: Argentine, Kansas – Chicago, Illinois (a one-time train that ran in 1899 on behalf of Collis P. Huntington).
- H.P. Lowe Special: Chicago, Illinois – Los Angeles, California (a one-time, record-breaking train that ran in 1903 on behalf of the president of the Engineering Company of America).
- Miss Nellie Bly Special: San Francisco, California – Chicago, Illinois (a one-time, record-breaking train that ran in 1890 on behalf of Nellie Bly, a reporter for the New York World newspaper).
- Peacock Special: Los Angeles, California – Chicago, Illinois (a one-time train that ran in 1900 on behalf of A.R. Peacock, vice-president of the Carnegie Steel and Iron Company).
- Scott Special: Los Angeles, California – Chicago, Illinois (the most well-known of Santa Fe's "specials", also known as the Coyote Special, the Death Valley Coyote, and the Death Valley Scotty Special: a one-time, record-breaking train that ran in 1905, essentially as a publicity stunt).
- Wakarusa Creek Picnic Special: Topeka, Kansas – Pauline, Kansas (a one-time train that took picnickers on a 30-minute trip, at a speed of 14 miles per hour (23 km/h), to celebrate the official opening of the line on April 26, 1869).

== Signals ==
The Santa Fe employed several distinctive wayside and crossing signal styles. In an effort to reduce grade crossing accidents, the Santa Fe was an early user of wigwag signals from the Magnetic Signal Company, beginning in the 1920s. They had several distinct styles that were not commonly seen elsewhere. Model 10's, which had the wigwag motor and banner coming from halfway up the mast with the crossbucks on top, were almost unique to the Santa Fe–the Southern Pacific had a few as well. Upper quadrant Magnetic Flagmen were used extensively on the Santa Fe as well–virtually every small town main street and a number of city streets had their crossings protected by these unique wigwags. Virtually all the wigwags were replaced with modern signals by the turn of the 21st century.

The railroad was also known for its tall "T-2 style" upper quadrant semaphores which provided traffic control on its lines. Again, the vast majority of these had been replaced by the beginning of the 21st century, with fewer than 10 still remaining in use in New Mexico as of 2023.

== Paint schemes ==
=== Steam locomotives ===
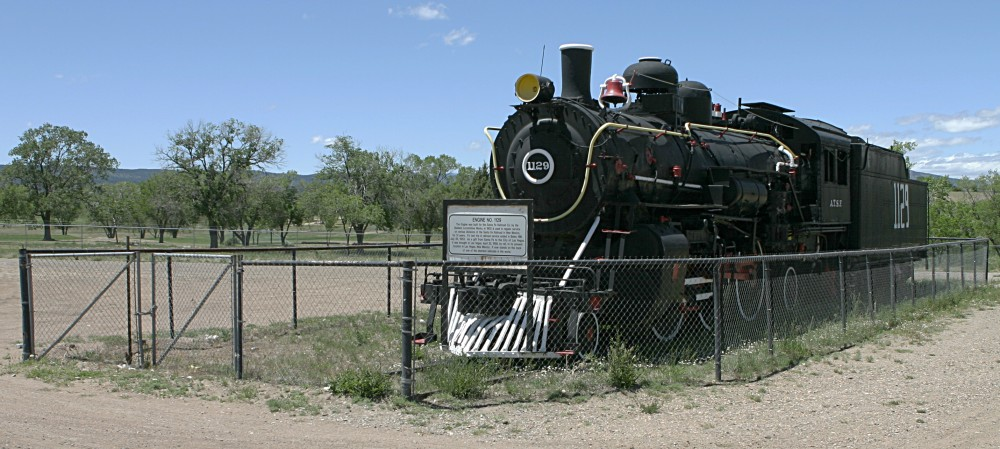
AT&SF#1129, a 1902 Baldwin 2-6-2 Prairie locomotive, preserved at Las Vegas, New Mexico, since 1956

The Santa Fe operated a large and varied fleet of steam locomotives. In 1899, the company owned 1,036 locomotives. Among them was the 2-10-2 "Santa Fe", originally built for the railroad by Baldwin Locomotive Works in 1903. The railroad would ultimately end up with the largest fleet of them, at over 300. Other types included 4-4-2 Atlantics, 2-6-0 Moguls, 2-8-0 Consolidations, 2-8-2 Mikados, 2-10-0 Decapods, 2-6-2 Prairies, 4-8-4 Heavy-Mountains, 4-6-4 Heavy-Pacifics, 4-6-2 Pacifics, 4-8-2 Mountains, 2-8-4 Berkshires, and 2-10-4 Texas. The railroad also operated a fleet of heavy articulated Mallet locomotives, including 1158 class 2-6-6-2s, 2-8-8-0s, 2-10-10-2s, 2-8-8-2s, and the rare 4-4-6-2. The railroad retired its last steam locomotive in 1959.

During the twentieth century, all but one of these was painted black, with white unit numbers on the sand domes and three sides of the tender. Cab sides were lettered "AT&SF", also in white. The subsidiary Gulf, Colorado and Santa Fe often painted all or part of the smokebox (between the boiler and the headlight) white or silver. In 1940, the circle and cross emblem was applied to the tenders of a few passenger locomotives, but these were all later painted over. After World War II, "Santa Fe" appeared on tender sides of mainline road locomotives in white, above the unit number. Locomotives were delivered from Baldwin with white paint on the wheel rims, but the road did not repaint these "whitewalls" after shopping the locomotives. After World War II, side rods and valve gear were painted chrome yellow. For a short time, Pacific types 1369 and 1376 were semi-streamlined for "Valley Flyer" service, with a unique paint scheme in colors similar to those used on the new passenger diesels. Unique was the two-tone light blue over royal blue scheme of streamlined Hudson type 3460.

=== Diesel locomotives ===
==== Passenger ====
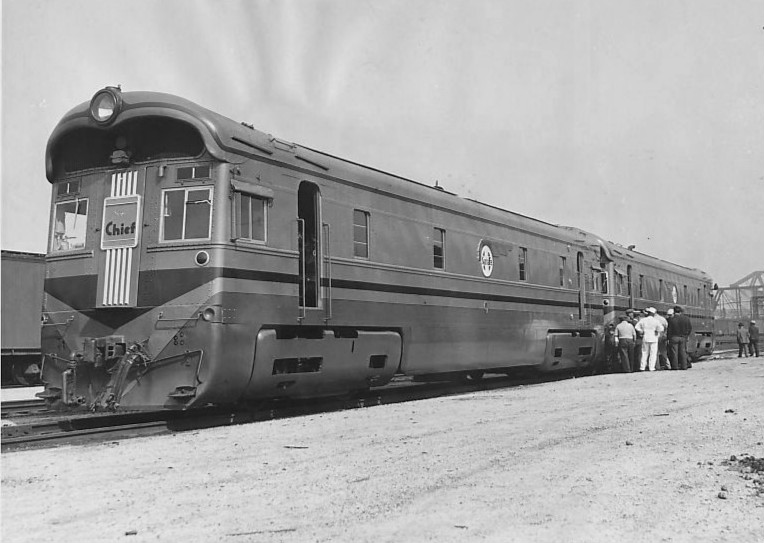
An EMC 1800 hp B-B in the original Golden Olive scheme in 1935

Santa Fe's first set of diesel-electric passenger locomotives was placed in service on the Super Chief in 1936 and consisted of a pair of blunt-nosed units (EMC 1800 hp B-B) designated as Nos. 1 and 1A. The upper portion of the sides and ends of the units were painted gold, while the lower section was a dark olive-green color; an olive stripe also ran along the sides and widened as it crossed the front of the locomotive.

Riveted to the sides of the units were metal plaques bearing a large "Indian Head" logo, which owed its origin to the 1926 Chief "drumhead" logo. "Super Chief" was emblazoned on a plaque located on the front. The rooftop was light slate gray, rimmed by a red pinstripe. This unique combination of colors was called the Golden Olive paint scheme. Before entering service, Sterling McDonald's General Motors Styling Department augmented the look with the addition of red and blue striping along both the sides and ends of the units in order to enhance their appearance.

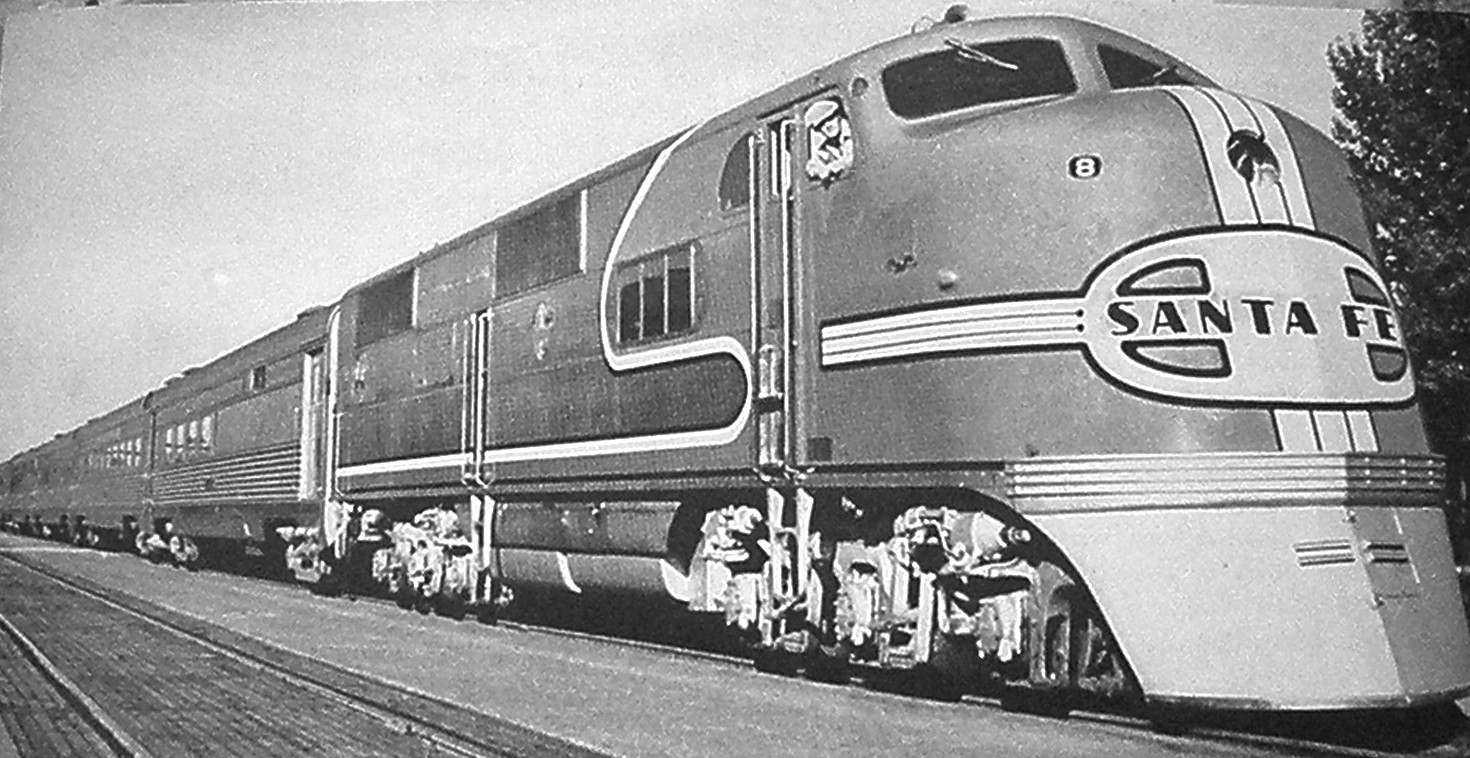
An EMC E1 in the Warbonnet scheme in 1938

In a little over a year, the EMC E1 (a new and improved streamlined locomotive) would be pulling the Super Chief and other passenger consists, resplendent in the now-famous Warbonnet paint scheme devised by Leland Knickerbocker of the GM Art and Color Section. Its design was protected under a U.S. design patent, granted on November 9, 1937. It is reminiscent of a Native American ceremonial head-dress. The scheme consisted of a red "bonnet" that wrapped around the front of the unit and was bordered by a yellow stripe and black pinstripe. The extent of the bonnet varied according to the locomotive model and was largely determined by the shape and length of the car body. The remainder of the unit was either painted silver or was composed of stainless-steel panels.

All units wore a nose emblem consisting of an elongated yellow "Circle and Cross" emblem with integral "tabs" on the nose and the sides, outlined and accented with black pinstripes, with variances according to the locomotive model. "SANTA FE" was displayed on the horizontal limb of the cross in black, Art Deco-style lettering. This emblem has come to be known as the "cigar band" due to its uncanny resemblance to the same. On all but the "Erie-built" units (which were essentially run as a demonstrator set), GE U28CG, GE U30CG, and FP45 units, a three-part yellow and black stripe ran up the nose behind the band.

A "Circle and Cross" motif (consisting of a yellow field, with red quadrants, outlined in black) was painted around the side windows on "as-delivered" E1 units. Similar designs were added to E3s, E6s, the DL109/110 locomotive set, and ATSF 1A after it was rebuilt and repainted. The sides of the units typically bore the words "SANTA FE" in black, 5"– or 9"–high extra extended Railroad Roman letters, as well as the "Indian Head" logo, with a few notable exceptions.

Railway identity on diesel locomotives in passenger service:

Locomotive Type	"Indian Head"	"Circle and Cross"	"Santa Fe"	Logotype	Starting Year	Comments
ATSF 1	Yes	Yes*	Yes	No	1937	"Circle and Cross" added to No. 1 after rebuild in May 1938
EMC E1, E3, & E6	Yes*	Yes	Yes	No	1937	"Indian Head" added to B units at a later date
ALCO DL109/110	Yes*	Yes	Yes	No	1941	No "Indian Head" on B unit
EMD FT	Yes*	No	Yes	No	1945	"Indian Head" added to B units at a later date
ALCO PA / PB	Yes*	No	Yes	No	1946	"Indian Head" added to B units at a later date
EMD F3	Yes*	No	Yes	No	1946	"Indian Head" on B units only
FM Erie-built	Yes*	No	Yes*	No	1947	"Indian Head" and "SANTA FE" on A units only
EMD F7	Yes*	No	Yes*	No	1949	"Indian Head" on B units only; "SANTA FE" added in 1954
EMD E8	Yes*	No	Yes	No	1952	"Indian Head" on B units only
GE U28CG	No	No	No	Yes	1966	"Santa Fe" logotype in large, red "billboard"-style letters
GE U30CG	No	No	Yes*	No	1967	5"–high non-extended "SANTA FE" letters
EMD FP45	No	No	Yes*	No	1967	9"–high "SANTA FE" letters

Source: Pelouze, Richard W. (1997). Trademarks of the Santa Fe Railway. The Santa Fe Railway Historical and Modeling Society, Inc., Highlands Ranch, Colorado, pp. 47–50.

In later years, Santa Fe adapted the scheme to its gas-electric "doodlebug" units. The standard for all of Santa Fe's passenger locomotives, the Warbonnet is considered by many to be the most-recognized corporate logo in the railroad industry. Early after Amtrak's inception in 1971, Santa Fe embarked on a program to repaint the red bonnet on its F units that were still engaged in hauling passenger consists with yellow (also called Yellowbonnets) or dark blue (nicknamed Bluebonnets), as it no longer wanted to project the image of a passenger carrier.

==== Freight ====
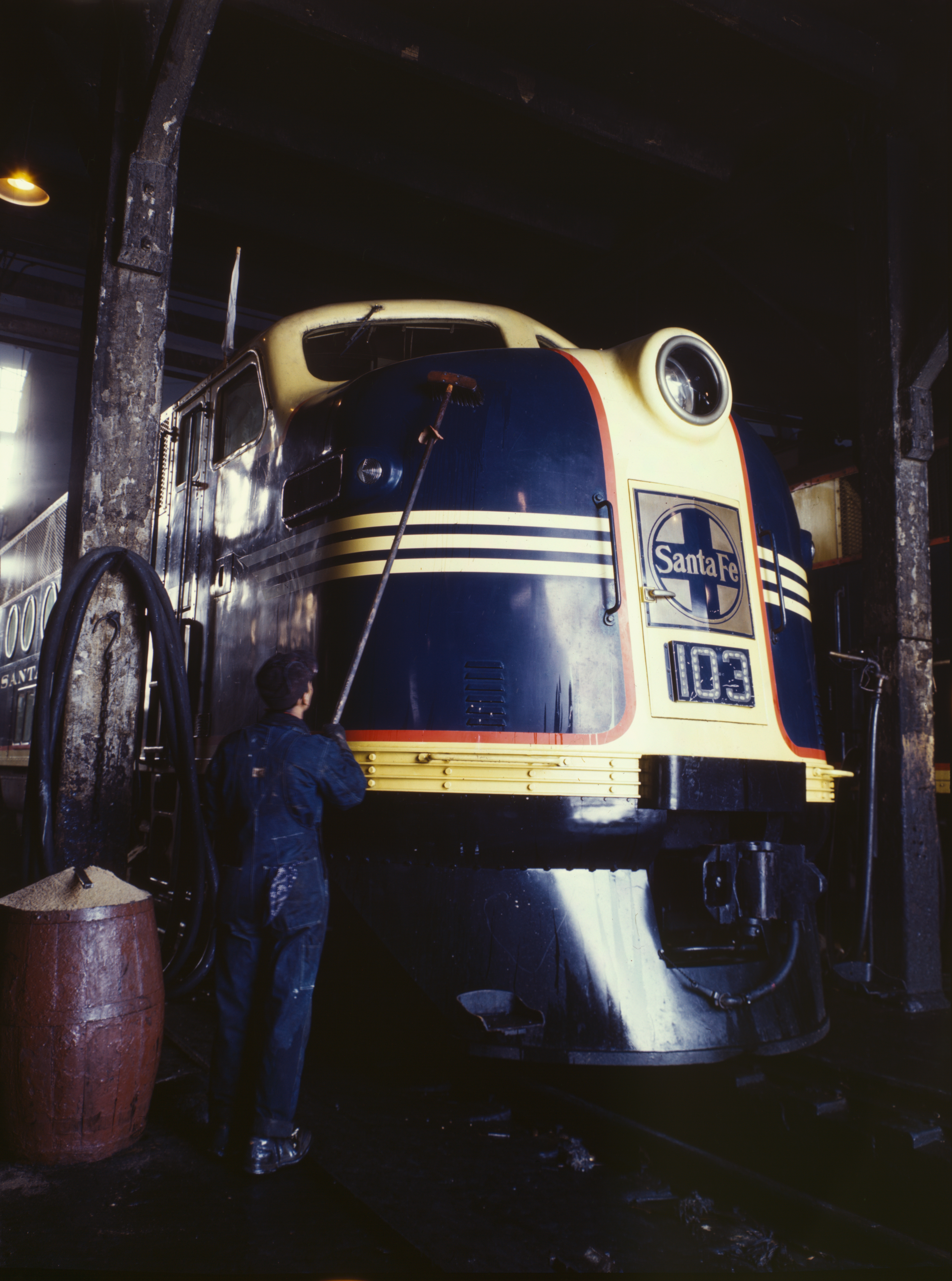
AT&SF #103, an EMD FT, decorated in the "Cat Whiskers" scheme, enters service during World War II.

Diesels used as switchers between 1935 and 1960 were painted black, with just a thin white or silver horizontal accent stripe (the sills were painted similarly). The letters "A.T.& S.F." were applied in a small font centered on the sides of the unit, as was the standard blue and white "Santa Fe" box logo. After World War II, diagonal white or silver stripes were added to the ends and cab sides to increase the visibility at grade crossings (typically referred to as the Zebra Stripe scheme). "A.T.& S.F." was now placed along the sides of the unit just above the accent stripe, with the blue and white "Santa Fe" box logo below.

Due to the lack of abundant water sources in the American desert, the Santa Fe Railway was among the first railroads to receive large numbers of streamlined diesel locomotives for use in freight service, in the form of the EMD FT. For the first group of FTs, delivered between December 1940 and March 1943 (#100–#119), the railroad selected a color scheme consisting of dark blue accented by a pale yellow stripe up the nose, and pale yellow highlights around the cab and along the mesh and framing of openings in the sides of the engine compartment; a thin red stripe separated the blue areas from the yellow.

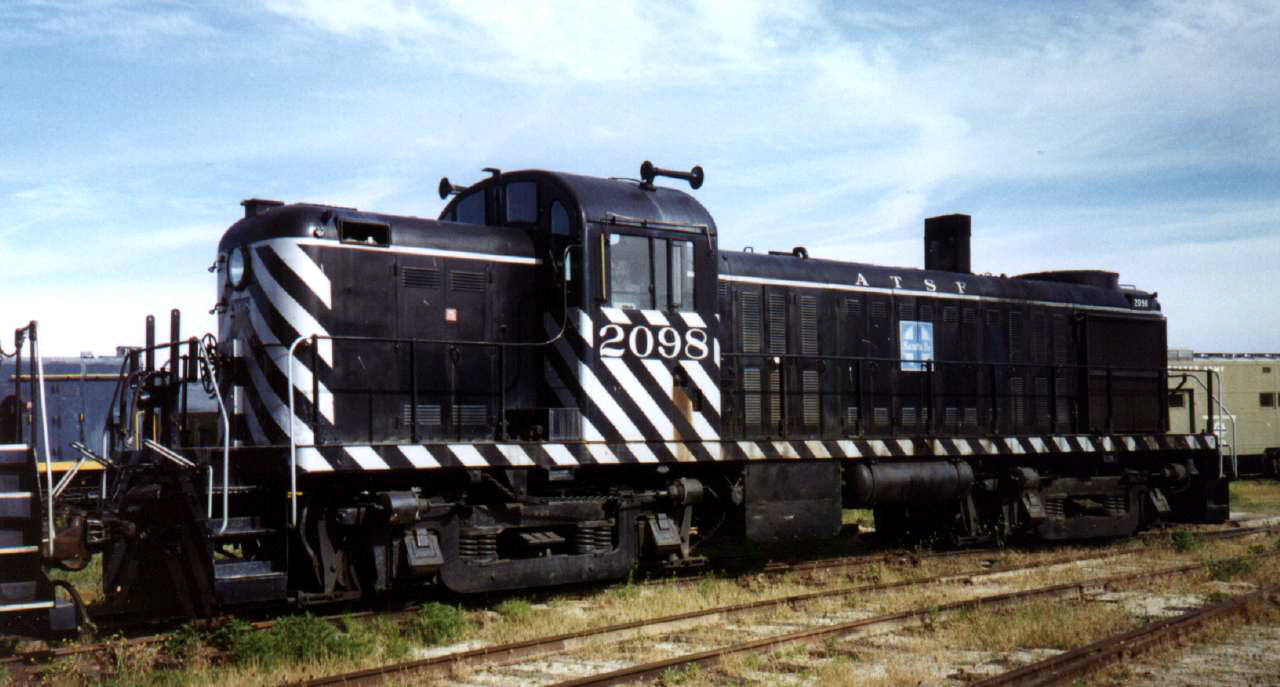
A museum restoration of Kennecott Copper Corporation #103 (an Alco model RS-2) now bears #2098 and the Zebra Stripe scheme.

The words "SANTA FE" were applied in yellow in a 5"–high extended font, and centered on the nose was the "Santa Fe" box logo (initially consisting of a blue cross, circle, and square painted on a solid bronze sheet, but subsequently changed to baked steel sheets painted bronze with the blue identifying elements applied on top). Three thin, pale-yellow stripes (known as Cat Whiskers) extended from the nose logo around the cab sides. In January 1951, Santa Fe revised the scheme to consist of three yellow stripes running up the nose, with the addition of a blue and yellow Cigar Band (similar in size and shape to that applied to passenger units); the blue background and elongated yellow "SANTA FE" lettering were retained.

The years 1960 to 1972 saw non-streamlined freight locomotives sporting the "Billboard" color scheme (sometimes referred to as the "Bookends" or "Pinstripe" scheme), where the units were predominantly dark blue with yellow ends and trim, with a single yellow accent pinstripe. The words "Santa Fe" were applied in yellow in large bold serif letters (logotype) to the sides of the locomotive below the accent stripe (save for yard switchers which displayed the "SANTA FE" in small yellow letters above the accent stripe, somewhat akin to the Zebra Stripe arrangement).

In late 1975 and early 1976, on the occasion of the United States Bicentennial, Santa Fe repainted five SD45-2s with a special Bicentennial scheme at its San Bernardino Shops. These locomotives, numbered #5700 to #5704 mainly they were placed at the front of the Super C high priority freight trains operating between Chicago and Los Angeles, although they were also seen leading the American Freedom Train's national tour on the Santa Fe lines and also participated in special events such as the grand opening, that same year 1976, of the new Railroad's Barstow Classification Yard. In the early 1980s these units were repainted in the company's standard blue and yellow scheme.

From 1972 to 1996, and even on into the BNSF era, the company adopted a new paint scheme often known among railfans as the "Freightbonnet" or "Yellowbonnet", which placed more yellow on the locomotives (reminiscent of the company's retired Warbonnet scheme); the goal again was to ensure higher visibility at grade crossings. The truck assemblies, previously colored black, now received silver paint.

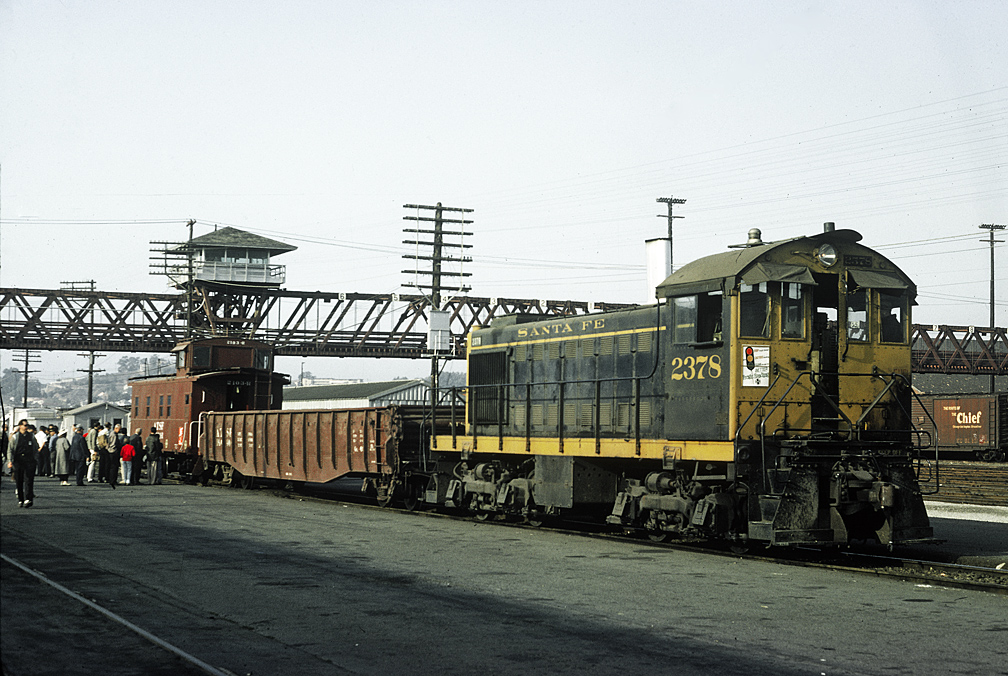
Santa Fe #2378, an Alco S-2 switcher in the Billboard scheme in 1966

In 1965, the road took delivery of ten GE U28CG dual service road switcher locomotives equally suited to passenger or fast freight service. These wore a variation of the "Warbonnet" scheme in which the black and yellow separating stripes disappeared. The "Santa Fe" name was emblazoned on the sides in large black letters, using the same stencils used on freight engines; these were soon repainted in red. In 1989, Santa Fe resurrected this version of the "Warbonnet" scheme and applied it to two SDFP45 units, #5992 and #5998. The units were re-designated as #101 and #102 and reentered service on July 4, 1989, as part of the new "Super Fleet" campaign (the first Santa Fe units to be so decorated for freight service). The six remaining FP45 units were thereafter similarly repainted and renumbered. From that point forward, most new locomotives wore red and silver, and many retained this scheme after the Burlington Northern Santa Fe merger, some with "BNSF" displayed across their sides.

For the initial deliveries of factory-new "Super Fleet" equipment, Santa Fe took delivery of the EMD GP60M and General Electric B40-8W which made the Santa Fe the only US Class I railroad to operate new 4-axle (B-B) freight locomotives equipped with the North American Safety Cab intended for high-speed intermodal service.

Several experimental and commemorative paint schemes emerged during the Santa Fe's diesel era. One combination was developed and partially implemented in anticipation of a merger between the parent companies of the Santa Fe and Southern Pacific (SP) railroads in 1984. The red, yellow, and black paint scheme with large yellow block letters on the sides and ends of the units of the proposed Southern Pacific Santa Fe Railroad (SPSF) has come to be somewhat derisively known among railfans as the Kodachrome livery, due to the similarity in colors to the boxes containing slide film sold by the Eastman Kodak Company under the same name. Santa Fe units repainted in this scheme were labeled "SF", Southern Pacific units "SP", and some (presumably new) units wore the letters "SPSF". After the ICC's denial of the merger, railfans joked that SPSF really stood for "Shouldn't Paint So Fast."

Paint schemes of the AT&SF locomotives

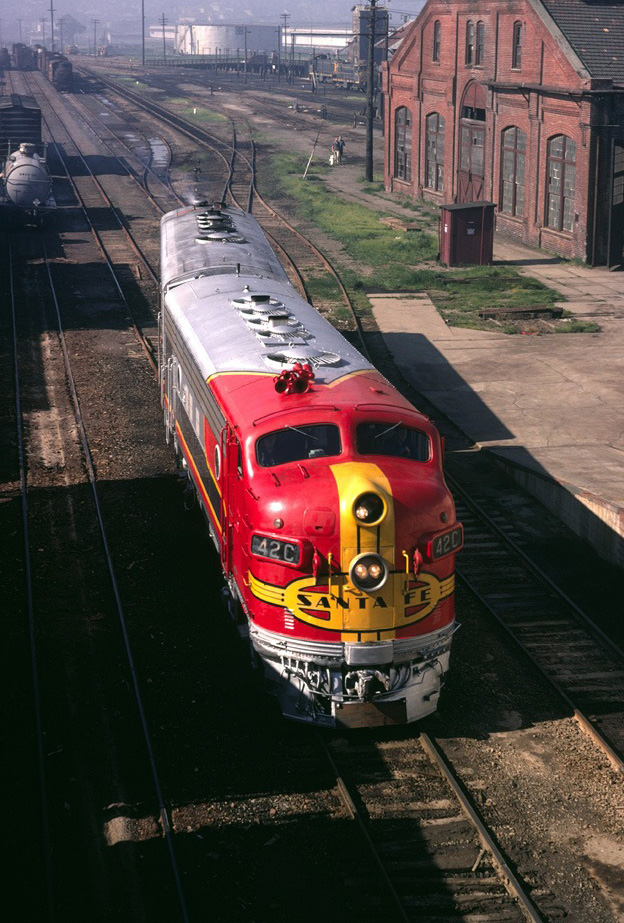
Warbonnet roof details on top of an EMD F7

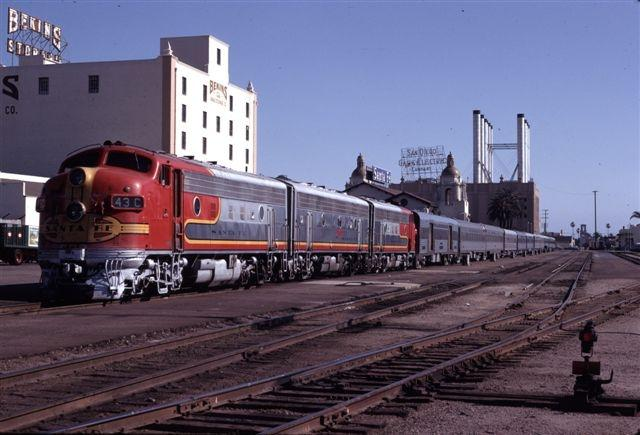
ATSF EMD F7 in 1968, displaying the "SANTA FE" in black Railroad Roman letters along each side

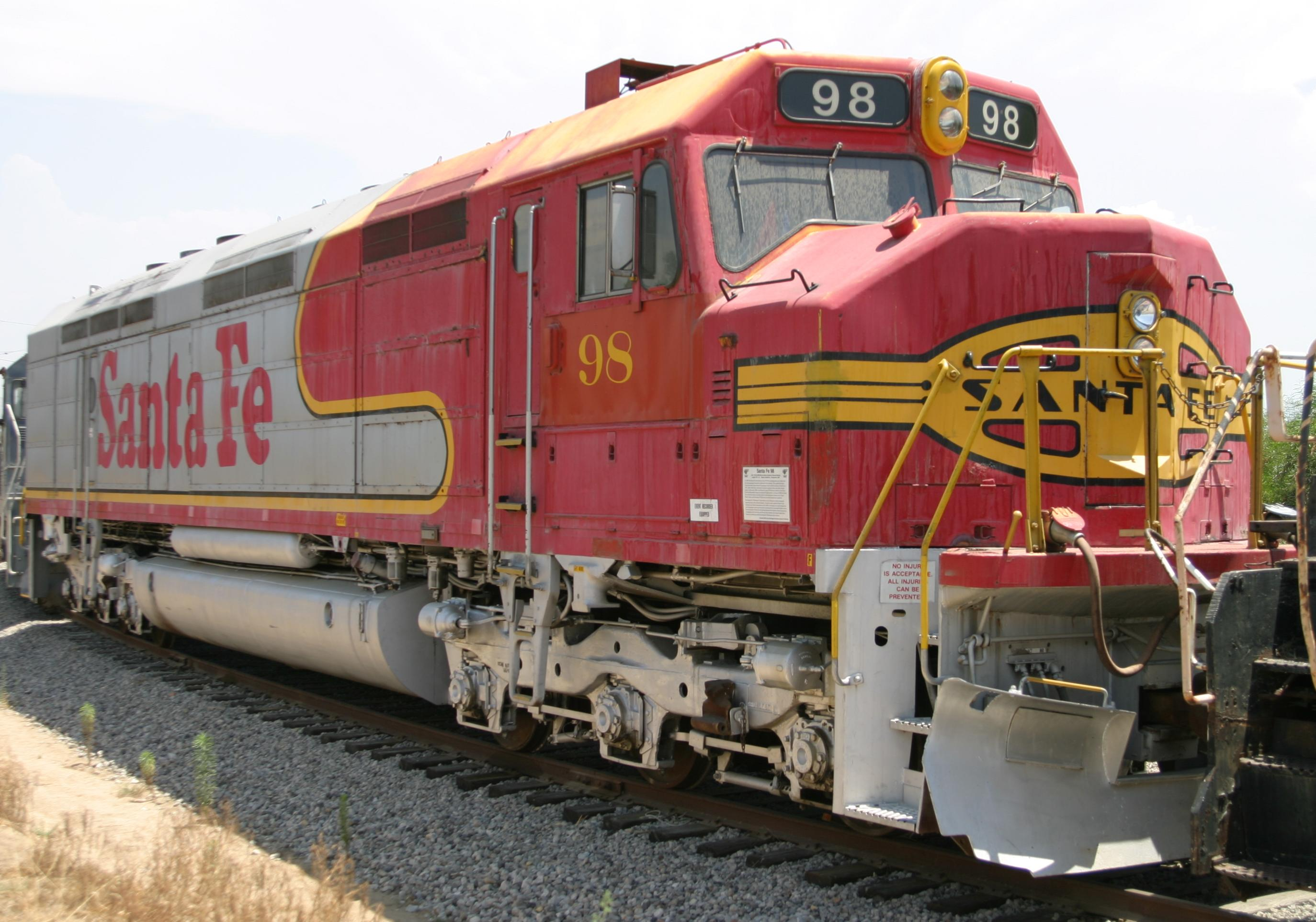
Santa Fe #98 (originally #108), an EMD FP45 decked out in Warbonnet colors, including the traditional "cigar band" nose emblem

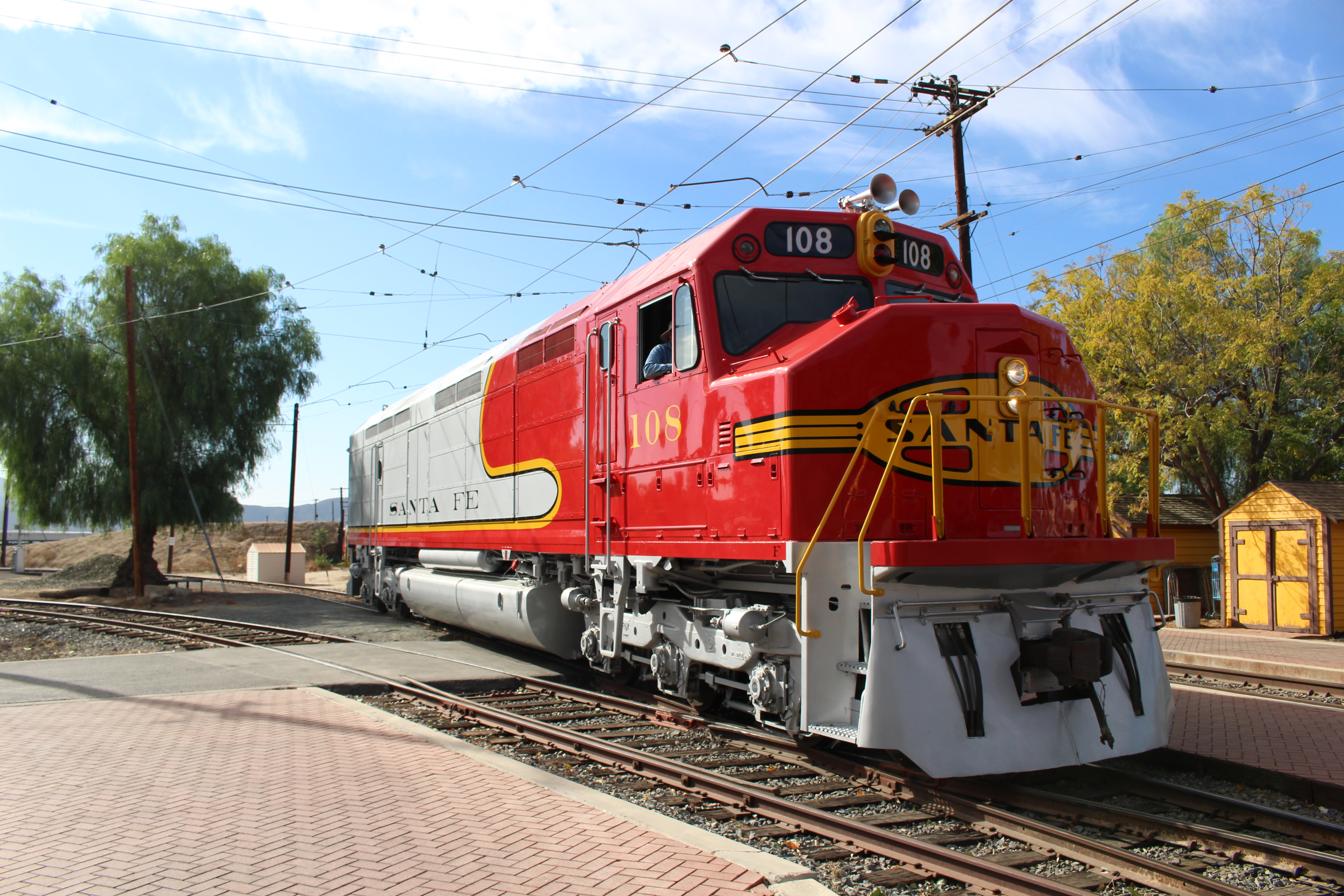
ATSF 108 at Southern California Railway Museum, repainted into its original colors

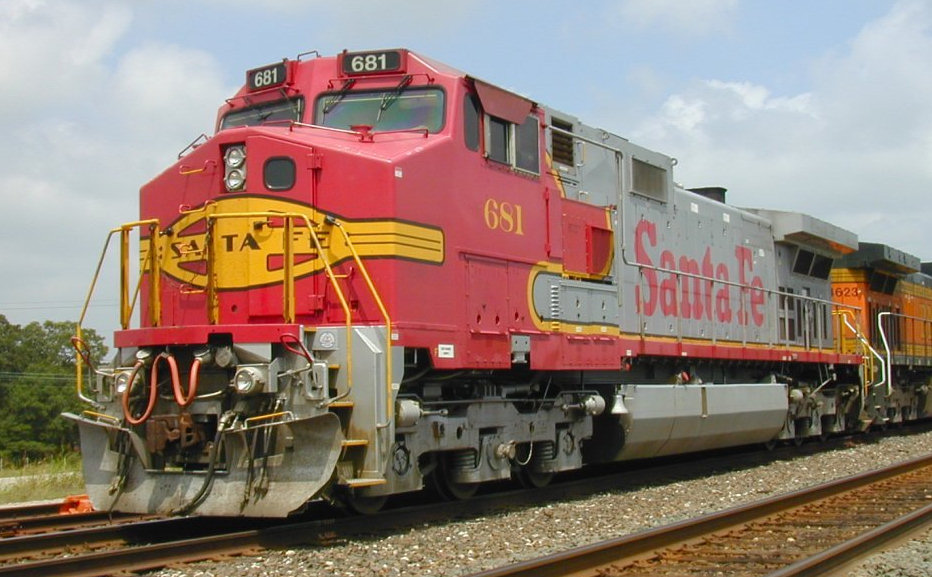
Santa Fe #681 in Sealy Texas in June 2001

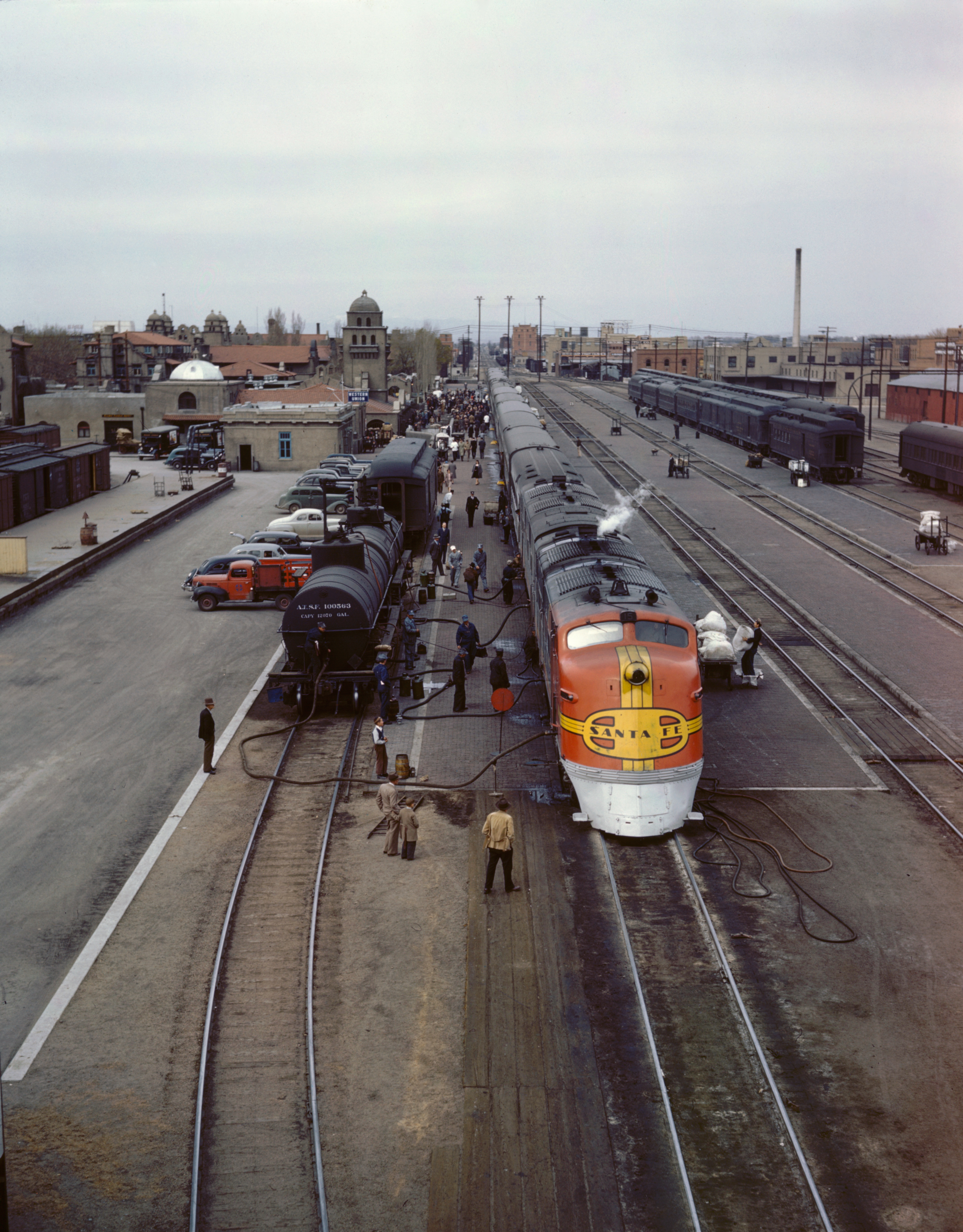
The L.A.-bound Super Chief gets its 5-minute pit-stop service in Albuquerque in 1943

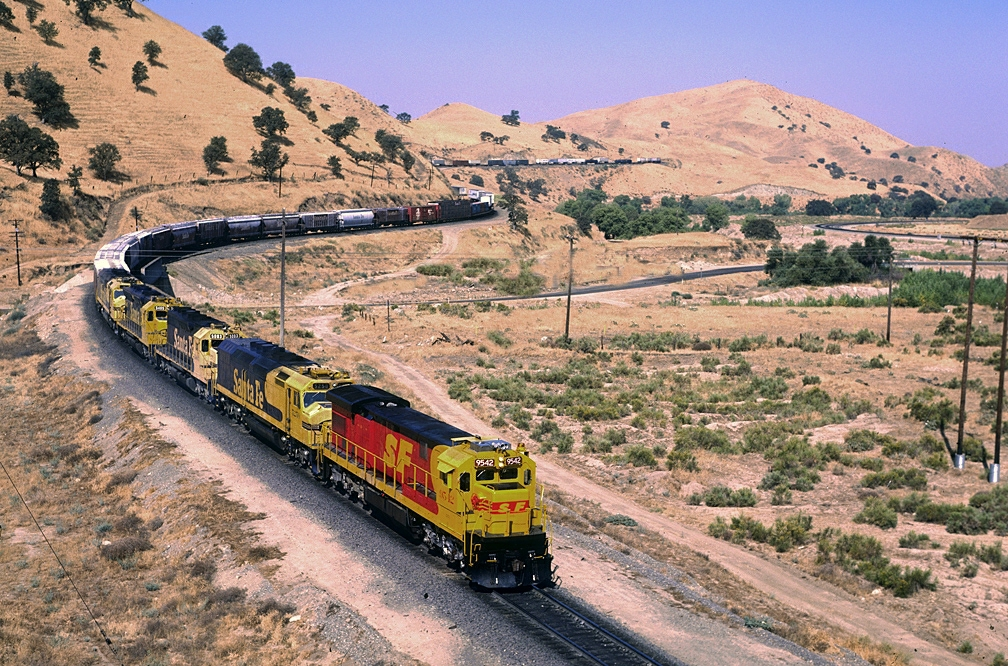
ATSF 9542 in Kodachrome leads other locomotives in the Freightbonnet livery in 1990

== Preserved locomotives ==
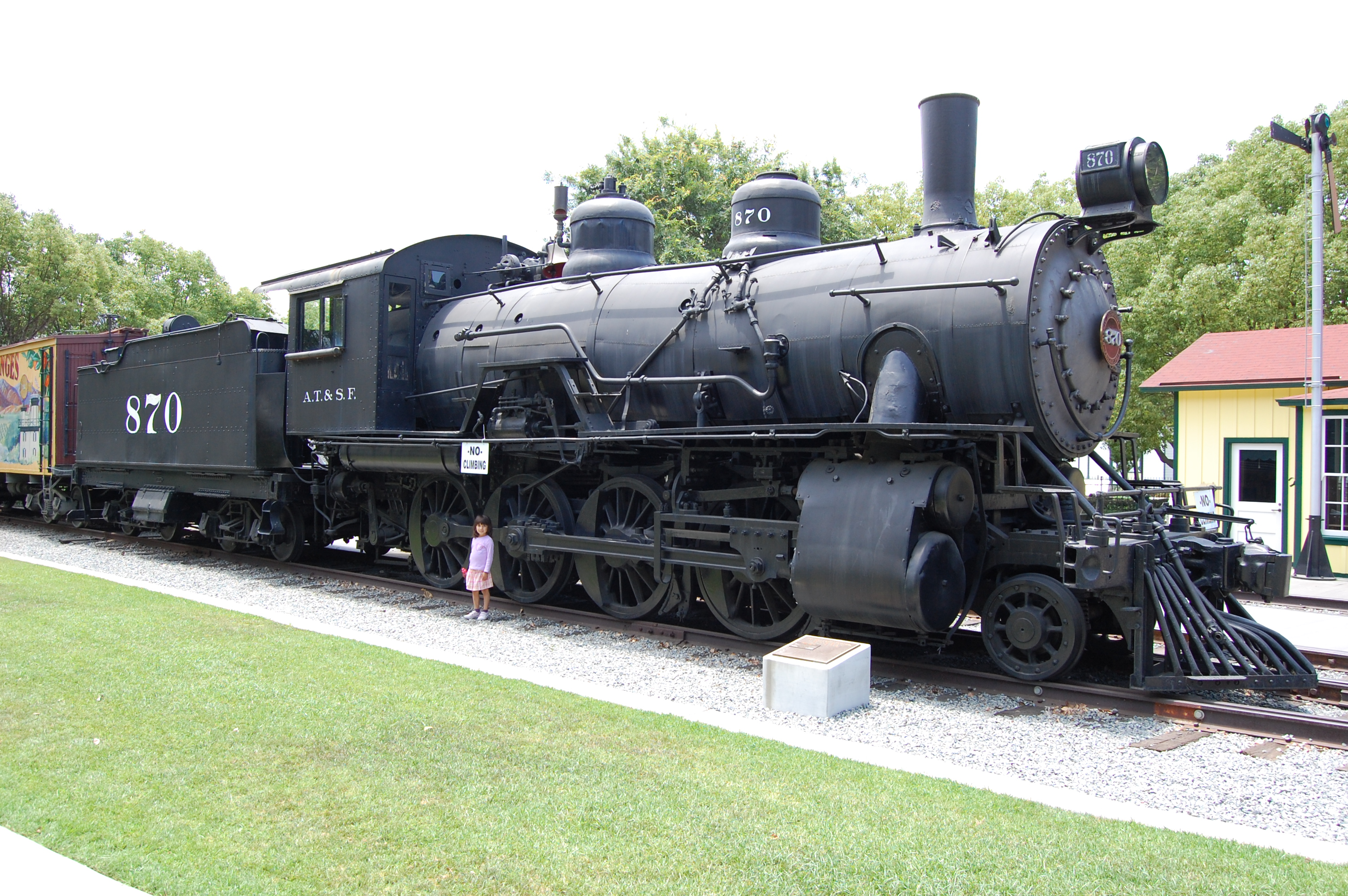
AT&SF No. 870, a 1906-built 2-8-0 from Burnham, Williams & Co. on static display at a park in Santa Fe Springs

While most of the Santa Fe's steam locomotives were retired and sold for scrap, over fifty were saved and donated to various parks and museums, a handful of which have either been restored to operating condition or are pending future restoration.

Some of the more notable locomotives include:

- 5 (0-4-0), located in the CTRC trolley barn at the San Jose Historical Museum.
- 132 (2-8-0), Built by Baldwin in 1880 and located at the Kansas Museum of History in Topeka. Named for Cyrus K. Holliday. Was used often by the Santa Fe for promotions and special events until it was donated to the Kansas State Historical Society in 1977. It is the second oldest locomotive from the Santa Fe that is preserved close to its original appearance.
- 643 (2-8-0), Originally built by Hinkley Locomotive Works in 1879 as #73 with a 4-4-0 arrangement. The oldest preserved locomotive of the Santa Fe, although not as originally configured. It was converted by the railroad to a 2-8-0 configuration following an accident in 1897. It had several upgrades over the years while working on the Gulf Division. It was formerly located at the then-new Oklahoma State Fairgrounds, following its donation from the Santa Fe to the people of Oklahoma in 1953. The locomotive was relocated again in 2015 to the Oklahoma Railway Museum in Oklahoma City, where it received a badly needed cleaning and thorough cosmetic restoration, and is currently on display.
- 769 (2-8-0), located at the Old Coal Mine Museum in Madrid, New Mexico. It is waiting to be moved to the Santa Fe Southern Railway in Santa Fe for future restoration to operating condition.
- 870 (2-8-0), located at Heritage Park in Santa Fe Springs, California.
- 940 (2-10-2), located at the Union depot in Bartlesville, Oklahoma. It is the only surviving steam locomotive from the Santa Fe with a 2-10-2 wheel arrangement.
- 1010 (2-6-2), located at the California State Railroad Museum in Sacramento, California. It is planned to go under restoration to operating condition.
- 1129 (2-6-2), located at Las Vegas, New Mexico.
- 1316 (4-6-2), formerly located at Fort Concho, Texas: the sole survivor of the 1309 class was restored to operating condition by the Texas State Railroad in the early 1980s as its No. 500. It is currently displayed at Palestine for another restoration for future excursion service.
- 1951 (2-8-0), located at Pauls Valley, Oklahoma
- Santa Fe 2542 (2-8-0), located in Wilson Park at Arkansas City, Ks
- 2913 (4-8-4), located in Riverview Park at Fort Madison, Iowa.
- 2926 (4-8-4), formerly located in Coronado Park in Albuquerque, New Mexico. This locomotive had been undergoing restoration for operational purposes by New Mexico Heritage Rail, which has expended 114,000 man-hours and $1,700,000 in donated funds on its restoration since 2002. It was restored in July 2021. Performed her first mainline travel on September 30, 2023.
- 3415 (4-6-2), formerly located at Eisenhower Park in Abilene, Kansas, until it was acquired by the Abilene and Smoky Valley Railroad and has been restored for excursion service since 2009. The locomotive is expected to be taken out of service for a 15-year boiler inspection later in 2023.
- 3416 (4-6-2), currently preserved at Great Bend, Kansas.
- 3417 (4-6-2), formerly preserved at Hulen Park, in Cleburne, Texas.
- 3423 (4-6-2), located at the Railroad & Heritage Museum in Temple Texas, it is currently preserved.
- 3424 (4-6-2), Preserved in Kinsley, Kansas.
- 3450 (4-6-4), the sole survivor of the 3450 class, this locomotive is the gateway of the RailGiants Train Museum in Pomona, California.
- 3463 (4-6-4), the sole survivor of the 3460 class, this locomotive is located at the Kansas Expocentre in Topeka, Kansas, awaiting a cosmetic restoration.
- 3751 (4-8-4), the Santa Fe's and Baldwin's very first 4-8-4, was once on display at Viaduct Park near the AT&SF depot in San Bernardino, California. The locomotive was moved out of the park in 1986 to be restored and, after almost 5 years later, No. 3751 made its first run on a 4-day trip from Los Angeles to Bakersfield and return in December 1991. This trip marked the beginning of No. 3751's career in excursion service. Beginning in 2017, 3751 underwent a federally required 15-year overhaul until September 2022. On the same month, it's federally required 15-year overhaul was complete, and after that, it attended the Amtrak Track Safety Event in Fullerton, California, on September 24, 2022, and September 25, 2022.
- 3759 (4-8-4): This locomotive is known for pulling the "Farewell to Steam Excursion" for the Santa Fe in 1955 before it was donated to the city of Kingman, Arizona, where it is currently on static display. It was almost acquired by the Grand Canyon Railway in the early 1990s.
- 3768 (4-8-4), after retiring in 1958, it was donated to the city of Wichita, Kansas, where it is currently preserved at the Great Plains Museum of Transportation.
- 5000 Madame Queen (2-10-4), the second-oldest preserved steam locomotive with a 2-10-4 wheel arrangement, Madame Queen is located in Amarillo, Texas, awaiting possible relocation elsewhere.
- 5011 (2-10-4), the first of the 5011 class, is on static display at the National Museum of Transportation in St. Louis, Missouri.
- 5017 (2-10-4), located at the National Railroad Museum in Green Bay, Wisconsin.
- 9005 (0-6-0), located in the historic train depot in Clovis, New Mexico

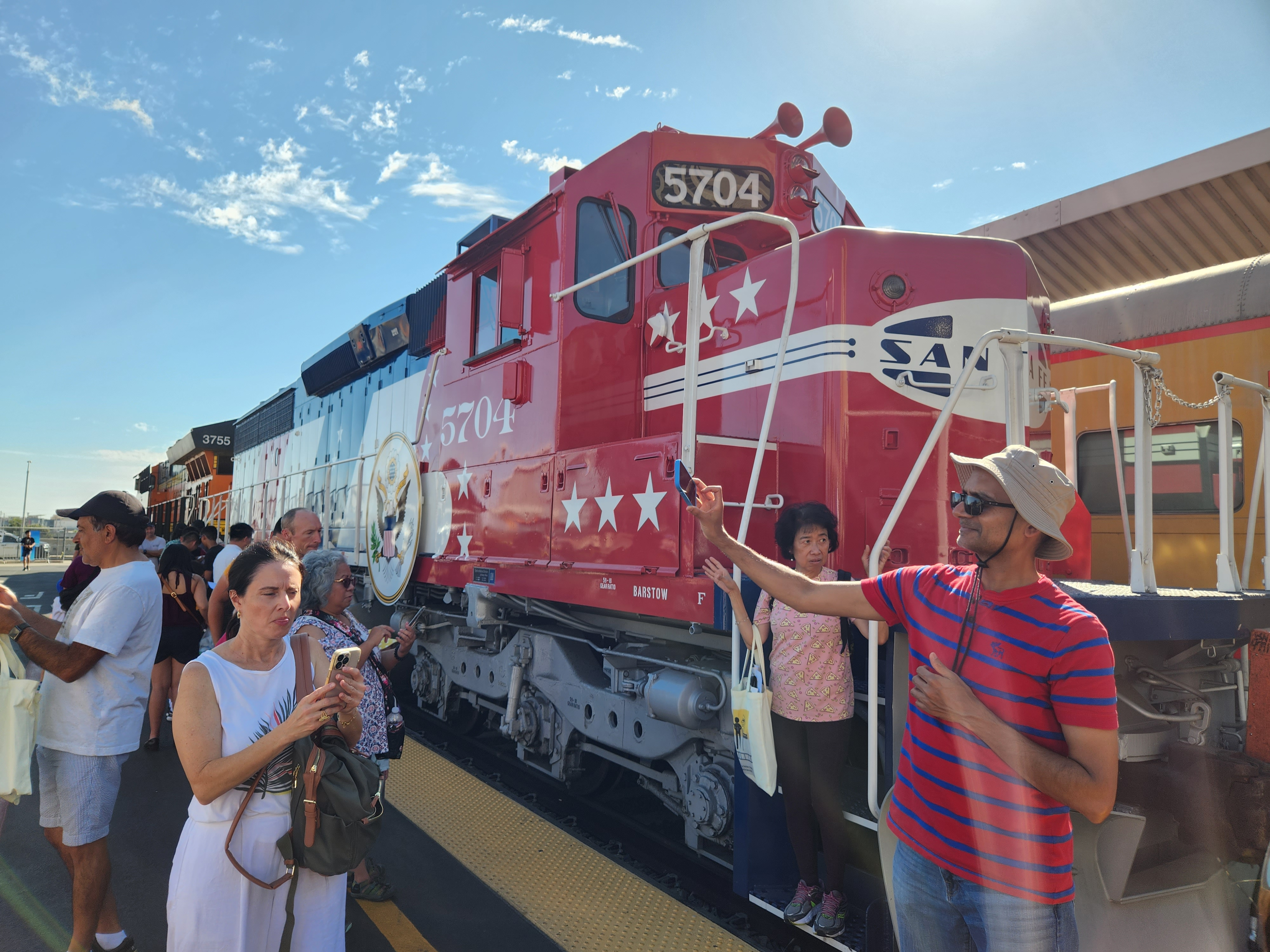
Santa Fe #5704, on display at Los Angeles Union Station on September 10, 2023. After being retired from active service by BNSF, it was donated to the SoCal Railroad Museum in Perris.

- 5704 (EMD SD45-2): After being removed from active service by BNSF, it was saved from being scrapped thanks to the efforts of Stephen Priest, a Kansas City railroad historian, and Eric Goodman, a member of BNSF management, who got the company to donate the locomotive to the SoCal Railroad Museum in Perris. After being repainted in the Bicentennial scheme at the Mid-America Car and Locomotive shops in Kansas City, and a public presentation at the Union Station located in the same City, the locomotive was taken to Los Angeles. After remaining in storage at the BNSF yard in Commerce for more than two years, waiting for Metrolink to rebuild the connector track to the Museum in Perris, on May 5, 2025 #5704 was finally taken to the SoCal Railway Museum, along with EMD F40PHM-2C #2105, donated to the Museum by Coaster.

== Ferry service ==
Santa Fe maintained and operated a fleet of three passenger ferry boats (the San Pablo, the San Pedro, and the Ocean Wave) that connected Richmond, California, with San Francisco by water. The ships traveled the eight miles between the San Francisco Ferry Terminal and the railroad's Point Richmond terminal across San Francisco Bay. The service was originally established as a continuation of the company's named passenger train runs such as the Angel and the Saint. The larger two ships (the San Pablo and the San Pedro) carried Fred Harvey Company dining facilities.

Rival SP owned the world's largest ferry fleet (which was subsidized by other railroad activities), at its peak carrying 40 million passengers and 60 million vehicles annually aboard 43 vessels. Santa Fe discontinued ferry service in 1933 due to the effects of the Great Depression and routed their trains to Southern Pacific's ferry terminal in Oakland. The San Francisco–Oakland Bay Bridge opened in 1936, initiating a slow decline in demand for SP's ferry service, which was eventually discontinued c. 1958; starting in 1938, SF-bound passengers could board buses across the bridge at the Santa Fe Oakland depot (located in Emeryville).

== See also ==
- ATSF 3460 class
- Beep (locomotive)
- CF7
- Corwith Yards, Chicago
- EMD F45
- EMD SDF40-2
- Christine Gonzalez
- David L. Gunn
- GE B23-7
- History of rail transportation in California
- List of defunct railroads of North America
- Santa Fe 3415 – a restored Pacific type steam locomotive
- Santa Fe 5000
- Santa Fe Refrigerator Despatch
- Santa Fe–Southern Pacific merger
- Santa Fe Southern Railway
- SD26
- Super C
- There Goes a Train
