= West Texas Express =

Discontinued Santa Fe Railway passenger train service in Texas

Overview
- Service type: Inter-city rail
- Status: Discontinued
- Locale: Texas
- Last service: June 19, 1965
- Successor: Heartland Flyer
- Former operator: Atchison, Topeka and Santa Fe Railway

Route
- Termini: Amarillo, Texas; Lubbock, Texas

Santa Fe passenger trains 93 and 96 operated between Amarillo and Lubbock, Texas. The westbound train was called the West Texas Express while its eastbound counterpart was known as the Eastern Express. For much of their careers they were stand-alone trains, operating without connecting cars at either end of the run. During the early part of the 1950s they were motor-trains, the equipment being articulated motor car M-190. In 1955, Train 96 was renumbered 94 and the trains became conventional locomotive-hauled operations. Between 1955 and 1965, Trains 93-94 consisted of a baggage car, one or more lightweight coaches and a Chicago-Lubbock sleeper (either a 10-3-2 or a 6-6-4 car) that interchanged with the San Francisco Chief at Amarillo. Trains 93-94 were discontinued on June 19, 1965.
