= Clovis station =

Historic train station in New Mexico, US

- Santa Fe Passenger Depot--Clovis
- U.S. National Register of Historic Places
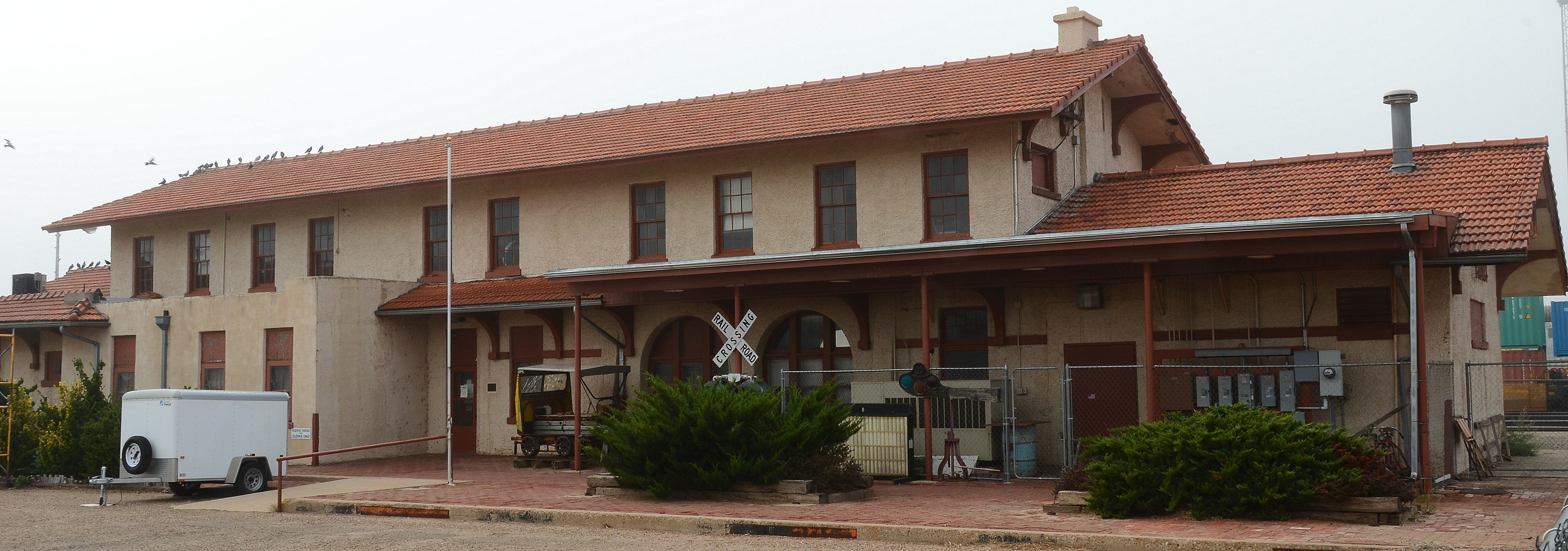

- Location within New Mexico Location within the United States
- Location: 221 W. First St., Clovis, New Mexico
- Coordinates: 34°23′52″N 103°12′26″W
- Area: less than one acre
- Built: 1907
- Built by: B. Lantry & Sons
- Architectural style: Mission/spanish Revival
- NRHP reference No.: 95001451
- Added to NRHP: December 14, 1995

The Clovis station, also known as the Clovis Depot, was built in 1907. It was listed on the National Register of Historic Places in 1995.

== History ==
The station was built by B. Lantry & Sons in Spanish Revival style, and is one of only three buildings of this style built by the Santa Fe Railway.

Notably it served long distance Chicago to California trains that took the route through Wichita, Kansas; northwest Oklahoma and Amarillo in northern Texas. This was in contrast to the more northerly route which went through Dodge City, Kansas and Albuquerque, New Mexico.

== Trains ==
Trains included:

- California Limited (Chicago – Los Angeles) (to 1954)
- California Special (Clovis – Temple, Texas) (to 1967)
- Grand Canyon Limited (Chicago – Los Angeles) (to 1968)
- San Francisco Chief (Chicago – San Francisco) (1954–1971)
- Scout (Chicago – Los Angeles, with secondary section to Oakland) (to 1954)

Preceding station	Atchison, Topeka and Santa Fe Railway	Following station
Gallaher toward Belen	Main Line Belen Cutoff	Farwell-Texico toward Wichita
Cameo toward Pecos	Pecos – Clovis	Terminus
