= Santa Fe class 1158 =

1158 class
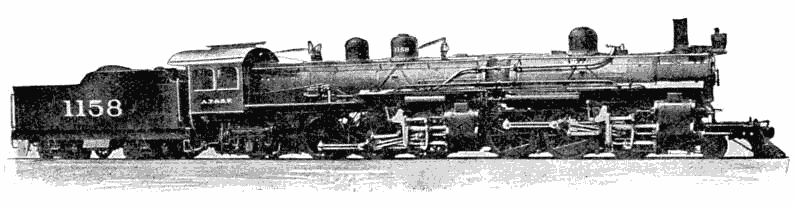
- Flexible-boilered Mallet system steam locomotive of the Atchison, Topeka and Santa Fe Railroad
Type and origin
- Power type: Steam
- Builder: Baldwin
- Build date: 1910
- Total produced: 2
Specifications
- Configuration
  - Whyte: 2-6-6-2
- Gauge: 4 ft 8 1/2 in (1,435 mm)
Career
- Operators: Atchison, Topeka and Santa Fe Railway
- Class: 1158
- Scrapped: 1920s

The Atchison, Topeka and Santa Fe Railway's 1158 class comprised two 2-6-6-2 articulated steam locomotives built in 1910 by the Baldwin Locomotive Works. They were jointed-boiler locomotives, an experiment confined to the Santa Fe; the railroad considered it successful enough to build four of the later 3300 class locomotives with flexible boilers, but both classes were scrapped in the 1920s.
