= Santa Fe class 3460 =

Class of 6 American 4-6-4 locomotives

ATSF 3460 class
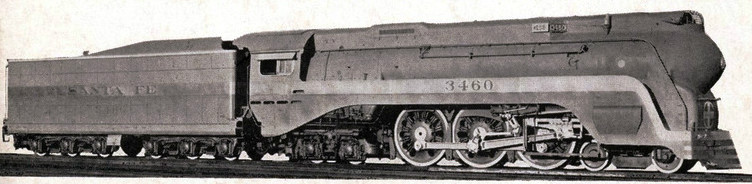
- ATSF 3460, the “Blue Goose”
Type and origin
- Power type: Steam
- Builder: Baldwin Locomotive Works
- Serial number: 62083-62088
- Build date: 1937
- Total produced: 6
Specifications
- Configuration
  - Whyte: 4-6-4
  - UIC: 2′C2′ h
- Gauge: 4 ft 8 1/2 in (1,435 mm) standard gauge
- Leading dia.: 37 in (940 mm)
- Driver dia.: 84 in (2,134 mm)
- Trailing dia.: 40 in (1,016 mm)
- Wheelbase: Loco: 41 ft 1 1/2 in (12.53 m)
- Length: Loco: 55 ft 3 1/4 in (16.85 m); Loco & tender: 102 ft 6 3/4 in (31.26 m)
- Width: 10 ft 9 in (3.28 m)
- Height: 15 ft 2 in (4.62 m); 16 ft 8 in (5.08 m) over raised stack extension
- Axle load: 70,266 lb (31,872 kilograms; 31.872 metric tons)
- Adhesive weight: 210,800 lb (95,600 kilograms; 95.6 metric tons)
- Loco weight: 417,300 lb (189,300 kilograms; 189.3 metric tons)
- Tender weight: 396,246 lb (179,734 kilograms; 179.734 metric tons)
- Total weight: 813,546 lb (369,018 kilograms; 369.018 metric tons)
- Fuel type: Oil
- Fuel capacity: 7,000 US gal (26,000 L; 5,800 imp gal)
- Water cap.: 20,000 US gal (76,000 L; 17,000 imp gal)
- Tender cap.: 7,000 US gal (26,000 L; 5,800 imp gal) oil, 20,000 US gal (76,000 L; 17,000 imp gal) water
- Firebox
  - Grate area: 99.5 sq ft (9.24 m^{2})
- Boiler: 88 in (2,235 mm)
- Boiler pressure: 300 lbf/in^{2} (2.07 MPa)
- Cylinders: Two, outside
- Cylinder size: 23.5 in × 29.5 in (597 mm × 749 mm)
- Valve gear: Walschaerts
- Valve type: Piston valves
Performance figures
- Maximum speed: 120 mph (193 km/h)
- Power output: 3,600 hp (2,700 kW) @ 50 mph (80 km/h) (drawbar)
- Tractive effort: 49,456 lbf (220.0 kN)
- Factor of adh.: 4.26
Career
- Operators: Atchison, Topeka and Santa Fe Railway
- Class: 3460 class
- Numbers: 3460–3465
- Nicknames: The Big Three
- Preserved: ATSF #3463, in Topeka, Kansas
- Disposition: One preserved, remainder scrapped

The Atchison, Topeka and Santa Fe Railway's 3460 class comprised six 4-6-4 "Super Hudson" type steam locomotives built in 1937 by the Baldwin Locomotive Works for service between La Junta, Colorado and Chicago, Illinois, a fairly flat division of the railroad suited for the 4-6-4 type. They were substantially larger than the road's earlier 3450 class locomotives, and all were built oil-fired, although in a manner that would allow for easy conversion to coal firing. All were fitted with SKF roller bearings on every axle.

They had much in common with the Milwaukee Road's class F7 and the Chicago and North Western Railway's class E-4, all three types being fast, 84-inch drivered 4-6-4s for Midwestern service with 300 lb/in^{2} boiler pressures.

In December 1937, locomotive #3461 set a world record for the longest single run by a steam locomotive by completing the 2,227 miles (3,584 km) from Los Angeles, California to Chicago without maintenance other than five refuelling stops en route, hauling Train #8, the Fast Mail Express. An average speed of 45 mph (72 km/h) was obtained, including stops; maximum speed during the run was 90 mph (140 km/h). During steeply graded portions of the run it was assisted by helper locomotives. Such long distance runs were a goal of railway operating departments to reduce locomotive numbers and through increased locomotive usage, reduce overall costs.

The first locomotive, #3460, was built streamlined; painted light, robin's egg blue and silver, it became known as the "Blue Goose". It was the Santa Fe's only streamlined steam locomotive, featuring extensively in railroad publicity.

Locomotive #3461 was fitted with a streamlined "skyline" casing along the top of the boiler, encasing stack and domes, in an experiment to see if it helped clear smoke away from the locomotive. It was not retained. All of the locomotives otherwise had a Santa Fe-style telescoping stack extension fitted, which elongated the stack to clear smoke better and could be lowered to pass under low bridges and tunnels.

The 3460 class 4-6-4s, the 3765 class 4-8-4s, and the 5001 class 2-10-4s were designed and ordered around the same time and had much in common in their designs; in addition, they used the same six-axle tender design. The classes together were often called the "Big Three".

== Preservation ==
Only one of this class survives, #3463 is on static display on the grounds to the Southeast of the Kansas Expocentre in Topeka, Kansas. It was initially planned to be restored to operating condition by the Coalition for Sustainable Rail (CSR), but after several years of delay and negotiations, including a legal dispute, the group was renamed to the Kaw Valley Rail Heritage Conservancy (KVRHC). The group's new intentions are to move #3463 to a more visible and protected site, build a shelter over the locomotive to protect it from the elements and cosmetically restore it to its 1956 appearance.

== Locomotive Fleet ==
Number	Baldwin serial number	Date built	Disposition	Notes
3460	62083	1937	Sold for scrap.	Streamlined, nicknamed "Blue Goose".
3461	62084	1937	Sold for scrap.	Ran the longest single run by a steam locomotive from Los Angeles to Chicago without maintenance.
3462	62085	1937	Sold for scrap.	
3463	62086	1937	On static display on the grounds to the Southeast of the Kansas Expocentre in Topeka, Kansas. Undergoing cosmetic restoration.	
3464	62087	1937	Sold for scrap.	
3465	62088	1937	Sold for scrap.	
