= Chicagoan and Kansas Cityan =

Named passenger trains of the Atchison, Topeka and Santa Fe Railway

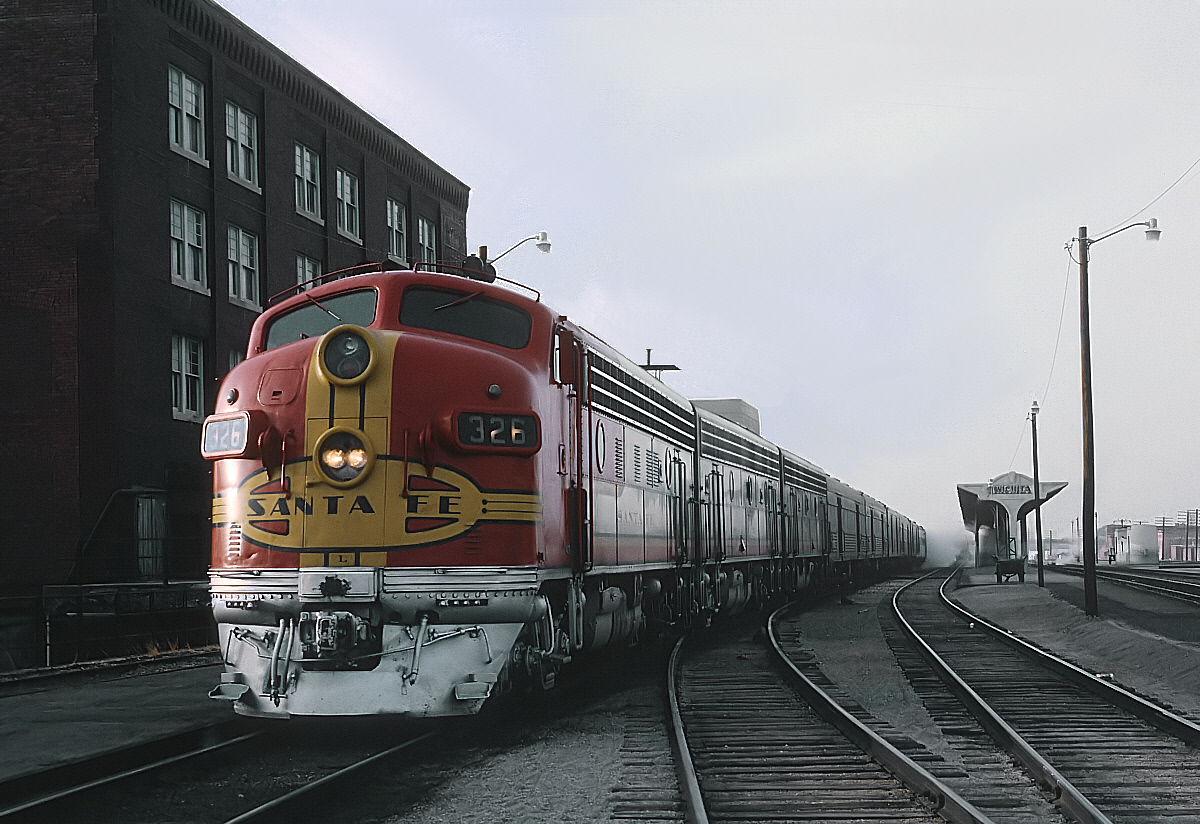
- The Chicagoan at Wichita Union Station in 1967

Overview
- Service type: Inter-city rail
- Status: Discontinued
- Locale: Midwest/Southwest
- First service: April 10, 1938
- Last service: April 18, 1968
- Former operator: Atchison, Topeka and Santa Fe Railway

Route
- Termini: Chicago; Wichita (1938–1939); Oklahoma City (1939–1961); Dallas (1961–1968)
- Service frequency: Daily
- Train number: 11/12

On-board services
- Seating arrangements: Chair cars
- Sleeping arrangements: Pullman cars (1948–late 1950s)
- Catering facilities: Lunch counter-dining car
- Observation facilities: Dome lounge car (after 1954)

The Chicagoan and Kansas Cityan were a pair of American named passenger trains operated by the Atchison, Topeka and Santa Fe Railway. They ran between Chicago, Illinois and Oklahoma City, Oklahoma. The trains were introduced as a Chicago–Wichita service in 1938 and extended to Oklahoma City (with Dallas through sleepers) the next year. A Kansas City–Tulsa connecting train, the Tulsan, was also introduced at that time. The Chicagoan and Kansas Cityan ran until 1968, while the Tulsan ran until 1971.

== History ==
In January 1938, the Atchison, Topeka and Santa Fe Railway (Santa Fe) announced plans to introduce a pair of Chicago–Kansas City streamliners – aptly named the Chicagoan and Kansas Cityan – around April 1 of that year. This was part of a substantial streamlining effort that year by the railroad, which also included a second pair of Super Chief trainsets, six sets for the Chief, two sets for the El Capitan, and one set for the San Diegan. The seven-car lightweight trains were to run on 7-hour schedules. In early April, the Santa Fe announced that the route would be extended from Kansas City to Wichita. Service of the Kansas Cityan and Chicagoan, trains 11 and 12, began on April 17, 1938. The trains operated the 678-mile (1,091 km) route in 11 3/4 hours on a daytime schedule. (Note: The Santa Fe incorrectly advertised the route as being 663 miles (1,067 km) – the length of the shorter route between Chicago and Wichita via the Ottawa Cutoff, which the trains did not use in order to serve Topeka.)

On December 10, 1939, the trains were extended to Oklahoma City, extending running times by about three hours. The schedule remained the same between Wichita and Chicago. Between Kansas City and Oklahoma City, they carried Pullman sleeping cars that ran overnight to/from Dallas on the Fast Fifteen and Chicago Express (trains 15/16). The Santa Fe also began operating a Kansas City–Tulsa streamliner (trains 211/212) that connected with the Chicagoan and Kansas Cityan at Kansas City. That train was named as the Tulsan early in 1940.

On January 6, 1948, the Chicagoan and Kansas Cityan began carrying Chicago–Dallas sleeping cars and coaches, which ran on the Fast Fifteen and Chicago Express south of Oklahoma City. On April 4, 1948, the Santa Fe introduced the Texas Chief as its premier Chicago–Texas train. It ran overnight between Chicago and Oklahoma (opposite the Chicagoan and Kansas Cityan), but its faster schedule allowed it to replace the Fast Fifteen and Chicago Express south of Fort Worth. Trains 111/112 (Texas Express and Chicago Express) began operating between Oklahoma City and Dallas on similar schedules as the replaced trains, with Chicago–Dallas through cars exchanged with the Chicagoan and Kansas Cityan at Oklahoma City.

The Chicagoan and Kansas Cityan received new full-length "Big Dome" lounges in 1954. After 1953, sleeping cars only operated between Kansas City and Dallas. They were removed from the trains later that decade. The Chicagoan became the Kansas City–Chicago connection for the eastbound northern section of the Grand Canyon on June 6, 1954. The Grand Canyon was rerouted away from Great Bend, Kansas on September 25, 1955. The Santa Fe began operating a Dodge City–Great Bend–Newton round trip, trains 311/312, which connected with the Chicagoan and Kansas Cityan at Newton in both directions. The Chicagoan began making local stops east of Kansas City only for passengers coming from train 312.

On March 3, 1957, the Kansas Cityan was combined with the Chief from Chicago to Kansas City. The combined train began making local stops east of Kansas City only for passengers connecting to train 311. Around 1961, the Chicago Express and Texas Express were merged with the Chicagoan and Kansas Cityan, rather than operating separately. Trains 311/312 were cut back slightly to Kinsley in June 1964 and discontinued on June 13, 1965.

In October 1967, the Santa Fe sought Interstate Commerce Commission (ICC) permission to discontinue most of its remaining passenger service due to the US Post Office ending rail transport of mail, which effectively subsidized many passenger trains. The Chicagoan, Kansas Cityan, Tulsan and Oil Flyer (another Tulsa–Kansas City train with Chicago connections) were among those proposed to be discontinued. Hearings for the Tulsa trains were held in January 1967. In hearings the next month regarding the Chicagoan and Kansas Cityan plus the Chicago-to-Kansas City Kansas City Chief, the railroad cited losses of $363,913 in 1966 (equivalent to $3,610,000 in 2025) for the three trains. The ICC granted permission in March to discontinue the Oil Flyer, but ordered the Tulsan kept for a year.

Permission to discontinue the Chicagoan, Kansas Cityan, and Kansas City Chief was given on April 12. The final runs of the trains were on April 17–18, 1968, leaving only the Texas Chief on the Santa Fe's Chicago–Texas route. Because the trains were discontinued less than 30 days after the order, the ICC required alternate service to several cities. The Texas Chief was rerouted to serve Lawrence and Topeka to fulfill this. The Tulsan continued to operate, with the Grand Canyon serving as its Chicago connection. When Amtrak took over intercity passenger service on May 1, 1971, the Texas Chief was retained, while the Tulsan was discontinued.
