= Los Angeles Limited =

Former American passenger train

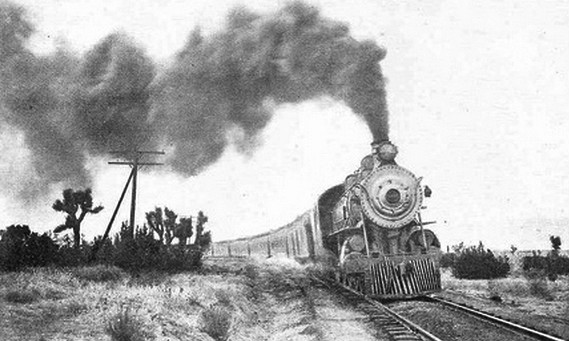
- The Los Angeles Limited on its first run in 1905

Overview
- Service type: Inter-city rail
- Status: Discontinued
- Locale: Western United States
- First service: 1905
- Last service: January 1954
- Former operator(s): Chicago and North Western Railway; Union Pacific Railroad

Route
- Termini: Chicago, Illinois; Los Angeles, California
- Line(s) used: Overland Route

Technical
- Track gauge: 4 ft 8 1/2 in (1,435 mm)

The Los Angeles Limited was a named passenger train in the United States. It was operated by the Union Pacific Railroad from 1905 to 1954.

== History ==
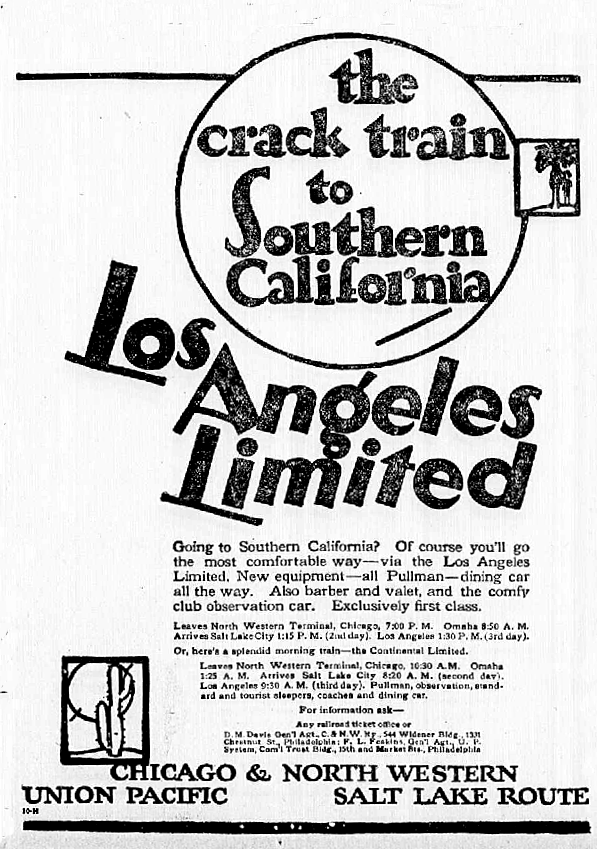
1920 newspaper ad for the train.

Beginning in 1905 the Los Angeles Limited was the flagship train of the Union Pacific between Chicago and Los Angeles. (From Chicago to Omaha the train was handled by the Chicago and North Western Railway). Union Pacific, which owned the train, completed the trip via Cheyenne, Ogden, Salt Lake City, Las Vegas and San Bernardino.

In early years the schedule was 68–74 hours; in November 1926 the schedule dropped to 63 hours each way to justify a $10 extra charge (which ended in June 1929).

=== Equipment ===
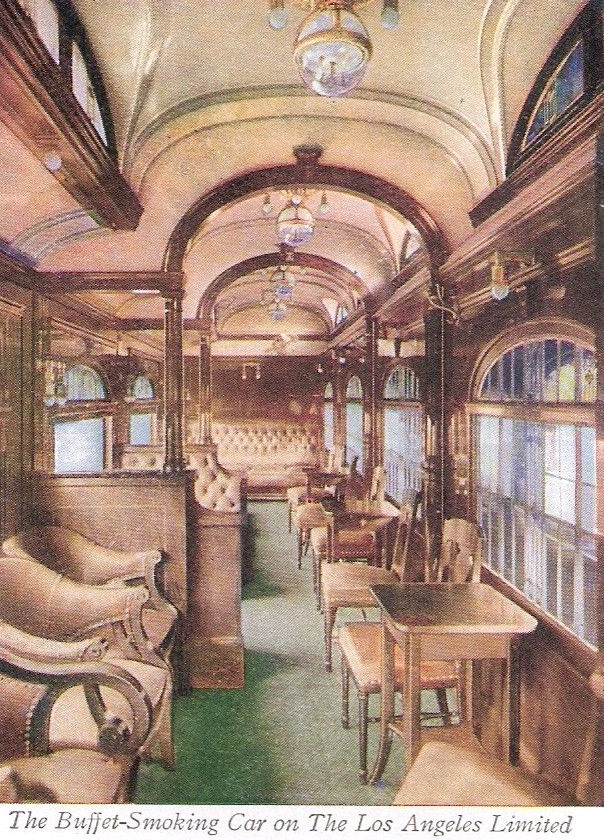
The buffet-smoking car, c. 1909

Until 1948, the cars had a black roof, dark Pullman-green body with yellow lettering, and black trucks. In 1948 the Union Pacific painted all of its heavyweight fleet in a two-tone gray paint scheme to match Pullman's lease passenger car equipment which were also being painted in the two-tone gray paint scheme. By 1952, all of Union Pacific's heavyweight passenger cars were painted in the amour yellow and gray to match the rest of the railroad's streamlined passenger cars. During this time, many streamlined and heavyweight cars were seen mixed into the LA Limited's consist, while some of the two-tone gray paint scheme was visible; since it took some time to repaint all of the heavyweight equipment Union Pacific's large rail network.

In the beginning the cars of the train were wood; after 1912 steel heavyweight cars started to replace the wooden cars. Until 1936 the Los Angeles Limited was the top train of the Union Pacific as a rival to other Chicago to Los Angeles trains such as Santa Fe's California Limited, De Luxe, Chief, and the Southern Pacific's Rock Island Golden State Limited.

In 1930 the train started carrying coaches for the first time because of the Great Depression. After the more economical secondary train Challenger was introduced in 1935, the train regained its all-Pullman status and once again became a very fine train; in 1936 it was the first Union Pacific heavyweight train to receive air conditioning. But in 1936 the Los Angeles Limited lost its prestigious premier status to the new City of Los Angeles streamliner, which became the new Union Pacific flagship train. The Los Angeles Limited became the secondary Chicago-to-Los Angeles train, but was the only Union Pacific all-Pullman train on that route (the City of Los Angeles streamliner always carried some coaches). After the City of Los Angeles went daily in 1947 the train resumed handling coaches, this time forever. In 1948 lightweight streamliner cars with four-wheel trucks began appearing, usually not more than five.

=== Ridership decline ===
In the 1950s ridership on the Los Angeles Limited declined rapidly. Sleeping car passengers could enjoy more modern streamlined sleeping cars on a faster schedule on the City of Los Angeles, which took 39-3/4 hours Chicago to LA while the Los Angeles Limited needed 45 hours. In January 1954 the once-proud flagship was replaced by a new Challenger with lightweight coaches and sleepers on a fast schedule.

== Motive Power ==
In the early years of the Los Angeles Limited's service, the train's primary motive power was an ALCO 4-6-2 Pacific type. In the early 1920s, the train was upgraded with newer steel, heavyweight passenger cars leased from Pullman, which caused troublesome for the Pacific types to keep schedule, especially through Echo Canyon and Cajon Pass. The Union Pacific responded by purchasing 39 4-8-2 Mountain types from ALCO. These locomotives exceeded UP's expectations. They became the primary motive power for the train until 1937, when UP began purchasing 4-8-4 Northern types, famously known as the FEF-1; to pull the train between Ogden and Omaha. The Mountain types maintained being the primary power between Ogden and Los Angeles until 1946 when the FEF's were all converted to oil in response to the coal strikes that broke out across the nation. Between Omaha and Chicago, the Chicago and North Western Railway pulled the train with an ALCO 4-6-4 Hudson type.

== A 1929 consist ==
- A 4-8-2 Mountain steam locomotive
1. Baggage Dormitory 2765
2. 12-1 Sleeper "Dahlonega"
3. 12-1 Sleeper "Nolando"
4. 10-1-2 Sleeper "Lake Champlain"
5. 10-1-2 Sleeper "Lake Crystal"
6. 10-1-1 Sleeper "Columbia Gorge"
7. Diner 307
8. 10-1-1 Sleeper "Crown Point"
9. 8-1-2 Sleeper "Centspur"
10. 8-1-2 Sleeper "Centgarde"
11. 6-3 Sleeper "Glen Campsie"
12. 6-3 Sleeper "Glen Dee"
13. Buffet Lounge Observation 1554

== A consist between 1948 and 1950 ==
- A 4-6-6-4 Challenger steam locomotive
1. Baggage
2. Coach
3. Coach
4. Café Lounge
5. 6-6-4 Sleeper (streamliner car)
6. 6-6-4 Sleeper (streamliner car) (Minneapolis - Los Angeles via Chicago & North Western train #203 to Omaha)
7. 6-6-4 Sleeper (streamliner car) (New York - Los Angeles via Pennsylvania Railroad Broadway Limited to Chicago)
8. 6-6-4 Sleeper (streamliner car) (New York - Los Angeles via Pennsylvania Railroad Broadway Limited to Chicago)
9. Diner
10. 4-4-4 Sleeper (streamliner car)
11. 12-1 Sleeper
12. 12-1 Sleeper
13. 10-2 Sleeper (Chicago - Omaha - Cedar City, summer season only)
14. 10-2 Sleeper (Chicago - Omaha - West Yellowstone, summer season only)
15. Buffet Lounge Observation

== A consist from November 1950 ==
- A 4-8-4 Northern steam locomotive
1. Baggage
2. Storage Mail
3. Storage Mail
4. Baggage Dormitory
5. Coach
6. Coach
7. Coach Lounge
8. Diner
9. Club Lounge
10. 4-4-2 Sleeper (streamliner car)
11. 12-4 Sleeper (streamliner car)
12. 10-6 Sleeper (streamliner car) (New York - Los Angeles via New York Central 20th Century Limited to Chicago)
13. 10-6 Sleeper (streamliner car) (New York - Los Angeles via Pennsylvania Railroad Broadway Limited to Chicago)
14. 6-6-4 Sleeper (streamliner car) (Minneapolis - Los Angeles via Chicago & North Western train #203 to Omaha)
15. 14 Section Sleeper
