= Texas Chief =

Passenger train operated by the Atchison, Topeka and Santa Fe Railway

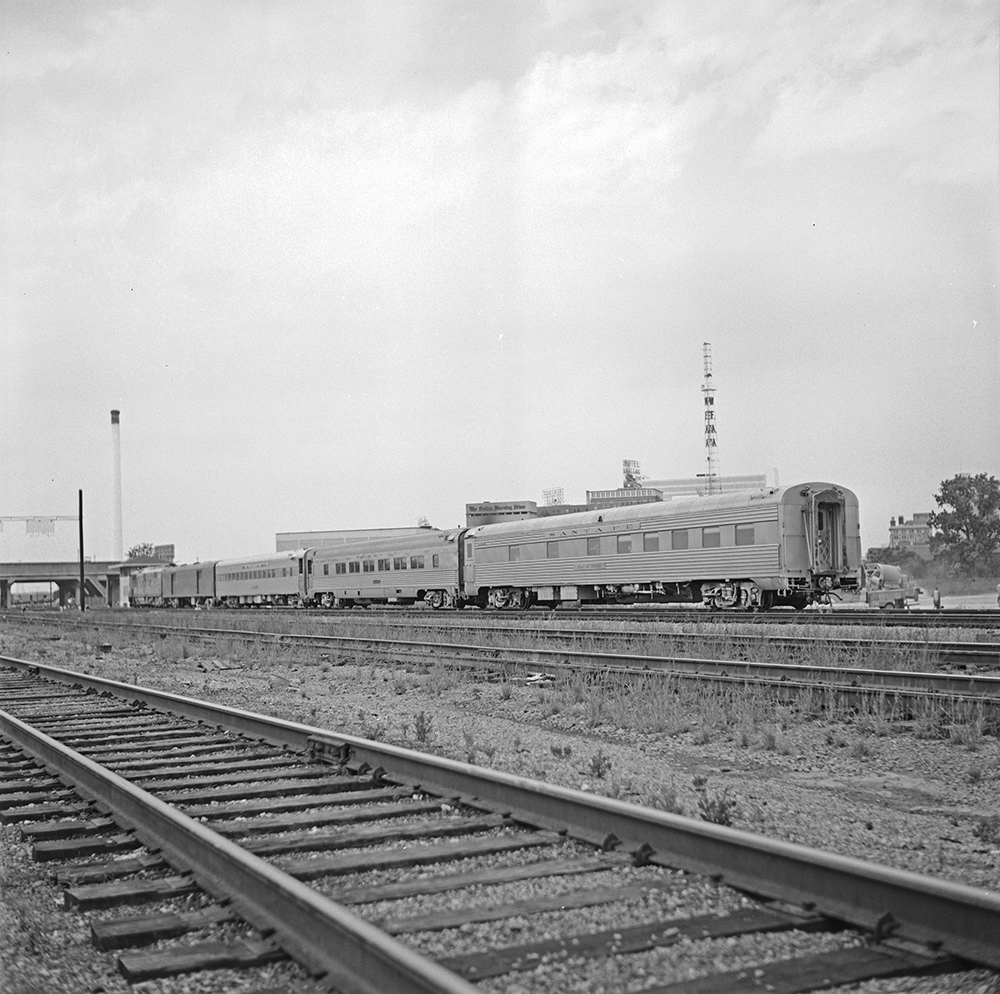
- The Dallas section of the Texas Chief in 1964

Overview
- Service type: Inter-city rail
- First service: April 3, 1948
- Last service: May 19, 1974
- Successor: Lone Star
- Former operators: Atchison, Topeka & Santa Fe Railway (1948–1971); Amtrak (1971–1974)

Route
- Termini: Chicago, Illinois; Galveston, Texas
- Distance travelled: 1,410 miles (2,270 km)
- Service frequency: Daily
- Train numbers: 15 (west), 16 (east)

On-board services
- Seating arrangements: Chair cars (also: ladies lounge and men's dressing room) (1950)
- Sleeping arrangements: Sections, roomettes, double bedroom, drawing rooms, compartment
- Catering facilities: Dining car
- Observation facilities: Lounge car

The Texas Chief was a passenger train operated by the Atchison, Topeka & Santa Fe Railway between Chicago, Illinois, and Galveston, Texas. It was the first Santa Fe "Chief" outside the Chicago–Los Angeles routes. The Santa Fe conveyed the Texas Chief to Amtrak in 1971, which renamed it the Lone Star in 1974. The train was discontinued in 1979.

== History ==
=== Santa Fe ===
The Santa Fe introduced the Texas Chief on April 3, 1948. The train competed with the Texas Eagle (Missouri Pacific Railroad) and the Texas Special (Missouri–Kansas–Texas Railroad/St. Louis–San Francisco Railway). The journey from Chicago to Galveston took 26 hours 15 minutes, ten hours faster the previous service on the route. Service to Dallas, Texas, began on December 5, 1955. Patronage was strong; historian Keith L. Bryant Jr. credited the Texas Chief with causing the withdrawal of the Texas Special. The Texas Chief was the first major train outside the Chicago–Los Angeles route to carry the "Chief" moniker popularized by the Chief and Super Chief.

=== Amtrak ===
The general decline in passenger traffic in the 1960s led to cutbacks on the Texas Chief. Service south of Houston, Texas, ended in April 1967. The Dallas section ended on August 4, 1968.

Amtrak retained the Texas Chief between Chicago and Houston. Santa Fe was planning to discontinue the service unless it was included in the new national system. In 1973 Amtrak proposed re-routing the Texas Chief to serve Dallas. This new route would use the Southern Pacific between Dallas and Houston. Opposition from the SP killed the plan. In 1974 the Santa Fe withdrew permission to use the name due to a perceived decline in service, so Amtrak renamed it the Lone Star.

== Rolling stock ==
The Texas Chief debuted with new equipment, including coaches, Pullman sleeping cars, a dining car, and a lounge. In 1966 the Santa Fe assigned its 10 new GE U28CG diesel locomotives to the Texas Chief. After 1968 excess Hi-Level coaches from the El Capitan and San Francisco Chief could be found on the Texas Chief, along with Big Dome full-length dome lounges from the discontinued Chief.

The Texas Chief featured a wide variety of equipment during its short Amtrak tenure. In addition to ex-Santa Fe equipment such as Hi-Level coaches and Big Domes, Amtrak assigned Vista-Dome dormitory-buffet-lounge-observation cars from the former California Zephyr.
