= Great Bend station =

Railway station in Great Bend, Kansas, US

Great Bend
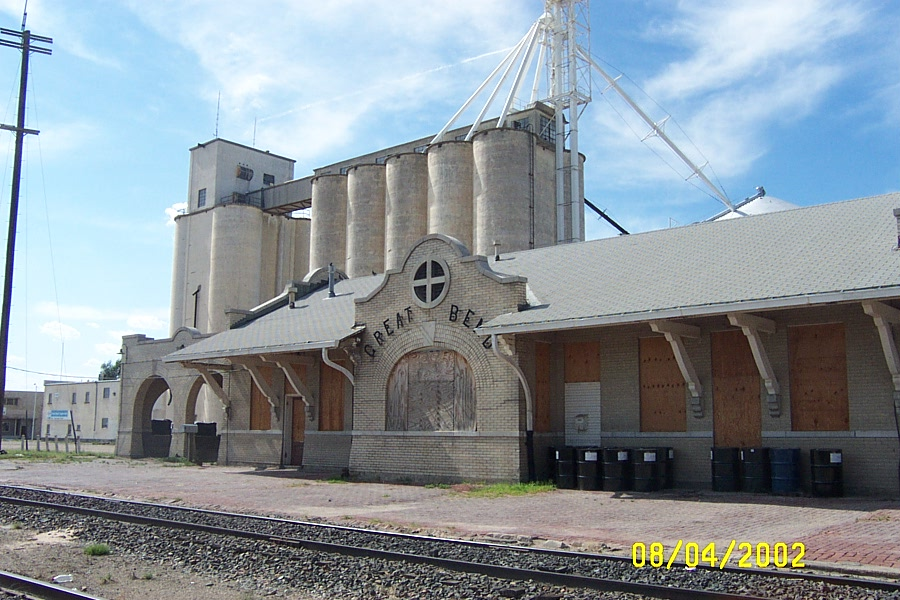
- The former station in 2002

General information
- Location: Kansas Avenue, near US-281 (Main Street); Great Bend, Kansas
- Coordinates: 38.35682°N 98.76368°W
- Lines: K&O Great Bend Subdivision and Scott City Subdivision
- Platforms: 1 side platform
- Tracks: 2

History
- Opened: 1872
- Rebuilt: March 17, 1911

Former services
Preceding station	Atchison, Topeka and Santa Fe Railway	Following station
Dundee toward Los Angeles	Main Line Via Great Bend, Ellinwood	Ellinwood toward Chicago
Location

Great Bend station was an Atchison, Topeka and Santa Fe Railway station in Great Bend, Kansas. The station was along Santa Fe's main line between Chicago and Los Angeles. It was on the "northern branch" of the main line as it split in Hutchinson, Kansas. It was also served by a line the ran to Garden City, Kansas, travelling through Ness City and Scott City. Both of these lines are now operated by the Kansas and Oklahoma Railroad.

The depot was built in a Mission Revival, common for Santa Fe and Southern Pacific stations in the late 19th and early 20th centuries. It consists of buff brick, broad eaves, arched windows, a stylized Santa Fe emblem, and an open-air waiting room.

By 1953, passenger service to Great Bend consisted of the daily Chicago–Los Angeles California Limited, a daily Newton–Dodge City local round trip, and a six-day-a-week mixed train between Great Bend and Scott City. The California Limited was rerouted over the southern mainline on January 10, 1954. The northern section of the Grand Canyon was rerouted through Great Bend to replace it. The Newton–Dodge City local was discontinued on June 6, 1954; the Grand Canyon began making local stops over that segment. The Grand Canyon was rerouted away from Great Bend on September 25, 1955. The Santa Fe began operating a Dodge City–Great Bend–Newton round trip, trains 311/312, which connected with the Chicagoan and Kansas Cityan at Newton. The Great Bend–Scott City mixed train, by then down to three weekly round trips, stopped carrying passengers on April 19, 1961. Trains 311/312 were discontinued on June 13, 1965. The station building remains extant.
