= Big Dome =

Fleet of streamlined dome cars

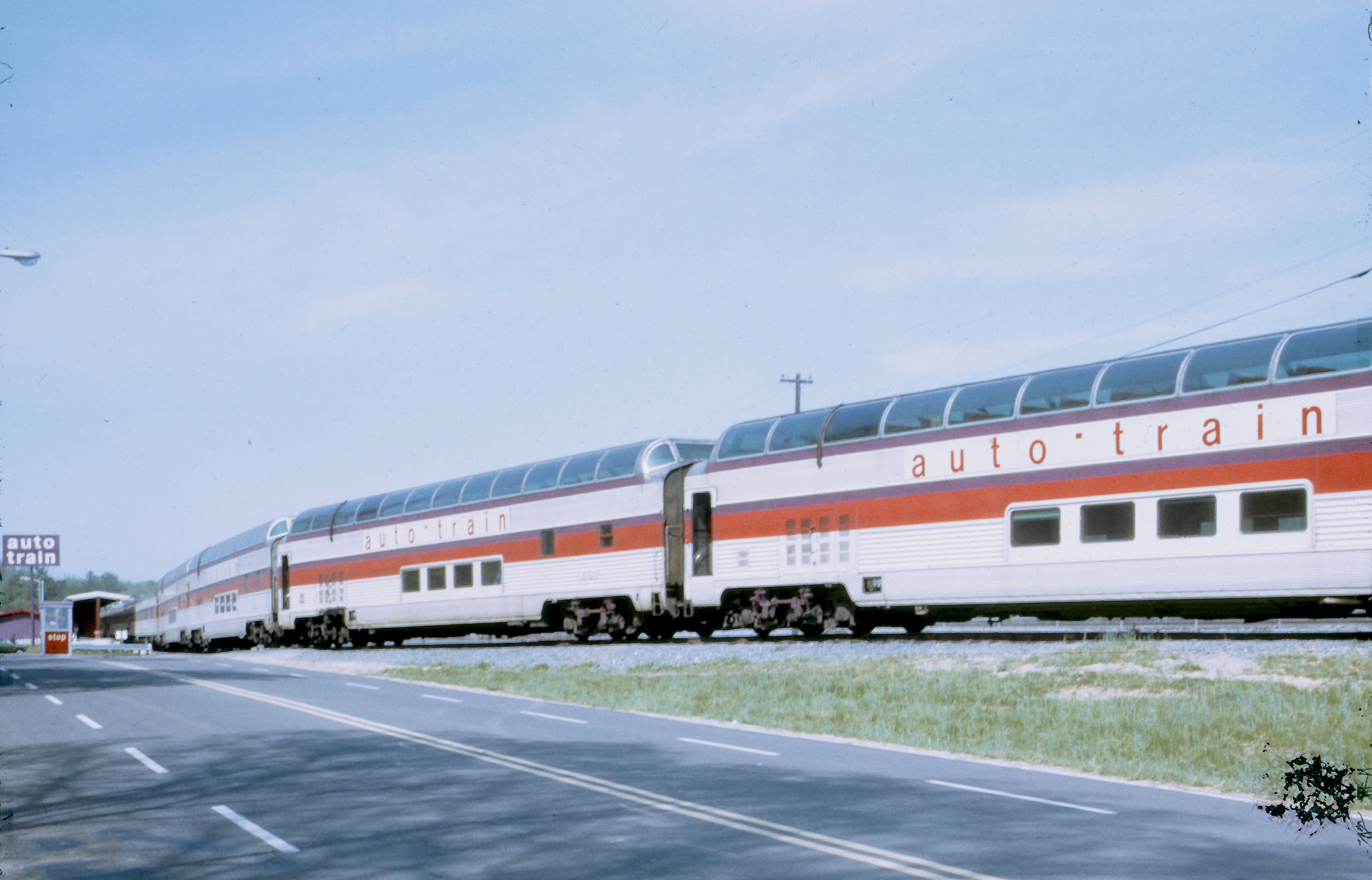
- Ex-ATSF Big Domes on the Auto-Train in 1973

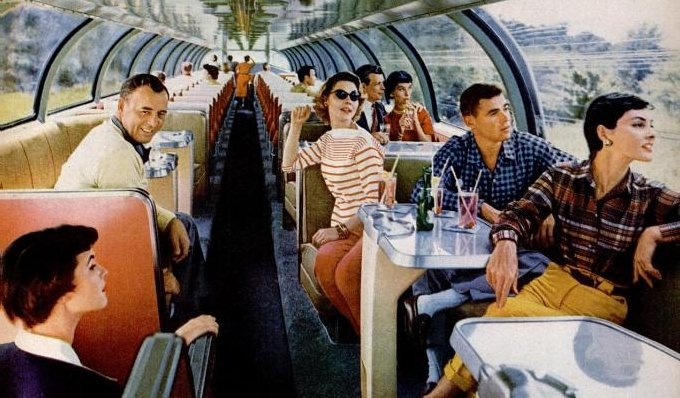
- The lounge area of a Big Dome in 1954
- In service: 1954–1981
- Manufacturer: Budd Company
- Constructed: 1954
- Number built: 14
- Fleet numbers: 506–513; 550–555 (ATSF)
- Capacity: 57 coach + 18 lounge (dome level)
- Operators: Atchison, Topeka and Santa Fe Railway (1954–1971); Auto-Train Corporation (1971–1981)

The Big Domes were a fleet of streamlined dome cars built by the Budd Company for the Atchison, Topeka and Santa Fe Railway ("Santa Fe") in 1954. Budd built a total of 14 cars in two batches. The Santa Fe operated all 14 on various streamlined trains until it conveyed its passenger trains to Amtrak in 1971. The Santa Fe retained one as a business car and sold the remaining 13 to the Auto-Train Corporation, which operated them for another ten years. All but two have been preserved in varying condition.

== Design ==
The Santa Fe had previously ordered six "Pleasure Domes" from Pullman-Standard for use on the Super Chief. These were first-class lounges, with parlor car-style swivel chairs in the dome area and a private dining room on the lower level. These were "short domes": the dome was centered and did not extend the full length of the car.

For the new Big Domes the Santa Fe and Budd went in a different direction. Like the Super Domes which Pullman had built two years previously for the Chicago, Milwaukee, St. Paul and Pacific Railroad ("Milwaukee Road"), these were "full-length" domes: the dome extended the entire length of the car. The top level featured coach-style seating for 57, plus a lounge area which could seat an additional 18 on sofas and in booths. The lower level came in two variations. The first eight (numbered 506–513) featured a cocktail lounge and nurses' room. The second six (numbered 550–555) had a smaller bar-lounge and crew dormitory. Much of the lower area in both configurations was given over to mechanical use, including air-conditioning. The cocktail lounge was decorated in a "unique Indian decor", a common motif on the Santa Fe.

When the Auto-Train Corporation purchased 13 of the Big Domes in 1971 it renovated the interiors. Reclining seats replaced the fixed seating, reducing capacity to 51. Two cars had their upper-lounge areas rebuilt as "night clubs."

== Service history ==
The Santa Fe took delivery of all 14 domes between January and May 1954. Contemporary advertisements touted the Big Domes as "the world's most beautiful railroad car." The cocktail-lounge Big Domes were assigned to the El Capitan, Chicagoan, and Kansas Cityan, while the lounge-dormitory domes went to the brand-new San Francisco Chief. The assignment to the El Capitan proved short-lived: already in 1954 the Santa Fe operated two prototype Hi-Level coaches on the El Capitan, and completely re-equipped it with those cars in 1956. The Big Domes moved to the Chief, where they remained until that train's cancellation in 1968. Their final home on the Santa Fe was the Texas Chief.

Amtrak retained the Texas Chief but did not purchase any of the Big Domes. They continued on the Texas Chief until September 1971, when the Santa Fe sold all but one to the new Auto-Train Corporation. After Auto-Train's bankruptcy in 1981 the fleet was broken up. Two (#550 and #555) have since been scrapped. The remaining 12 are privately owned: BNSF Railway and Norfolk Southern each operate one in their respective business car fleets; two operate on the Royal Gorge Route Railroad excursion train in Colorado; and eight were owned by Iowa Pacific Holdings before being sold to multiple museums, tourist railroads, and major railroads after Iowa Pacific's bankruptcy. No. 551 "SkyView" is in daily seasonal operation at the North Shore Scenic Railroad in Duluth, Minnesota.
