= California Limited =

Named passenger train of the Atchison, Topeka and Santa Fe Railway

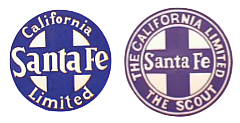

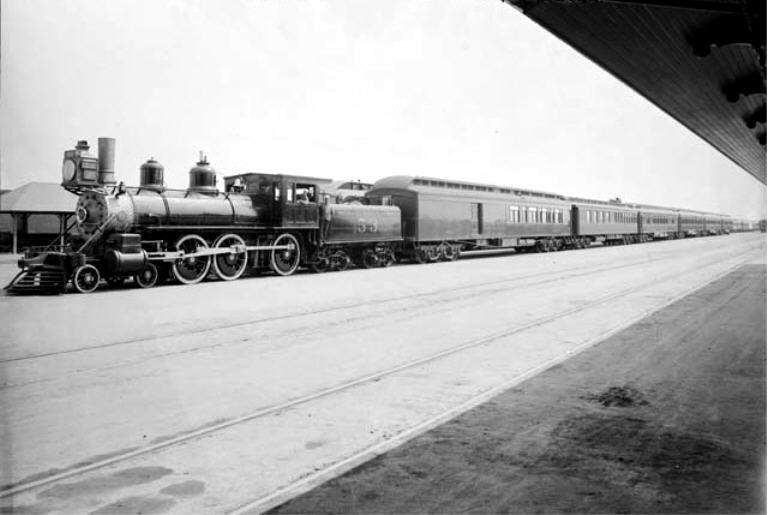
- California Limited in Los Angeles, California, with engine No. 53 at the La Grande Station circa 1899

Overview
- First service: November 27, 1892
- Last service: June 15, 1954
- Successor: San Francisco Chief
- Former operator: Atchison, Topeka and Santa Fe Railway

Route
- Termini: Chicago, Illinois; Los Angeles, California; San Diego, California; Oakland, California
- Train numbers: 3 and 4

The California Limited was one of the named passenger trains of the Atchison, Topeka and Santa Fe Railway. It carried train Nos. 3 & 4 and ran between Chicago, Illinois, and Los Angeles, California.

The line was conceived by company president Allen Manvel as a means to "signify completion of the basic Santa Fe system." Manvel felt he could attract business and enhance the prestige of the railroad with daily first-class service from Chicago to the West Coast. The California Limited, billed as the "Finest Train West of Chicago," made its first run on November 27, 1892.

The California Limited was the first Santa Fe train with Fred Harvey Company meal service. The later trains also offered air conditioning, a barber, beautician, steam-operated clothing press, even a shower-bath. The Limited was the first Santa Fe train with illuminated drumhead on its observation cars, with the train's name over the company logo.

The California Limited was withdrawn on June 15, 1954, giving it the longest tenure of any train on the Chicago–Los Angeles run of the Santa Fe.

== History ==
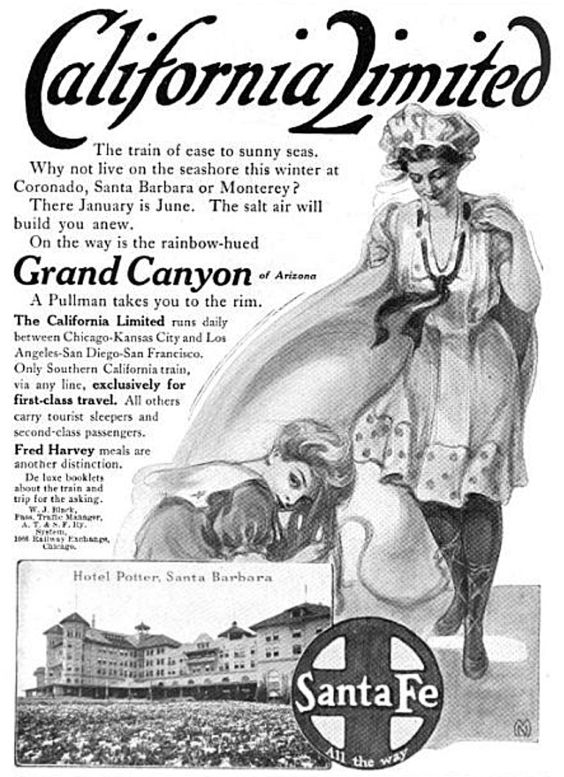
1910 magazine advertisement for the California Limited.

The Santa Fe introduced the California Limited on November 27, 1892. The journey took 83 hours and 50 minutes and required fifteen locomotive changes. During the summer, multiple sections were necessary to accommodate demand; reportedly 23 sections once operated eastbound on one day (including three groups of seven or eight sections, fresh out of Los Angeles, one day out, and two days out). The same day there were 22 westbound sections, for a total of 45 complete trains operating as the California Limited. The train carried just Pullman sleeping cars (no coaches) until 1938.

The Santa Fe re-equipped the California Limited in 1910 with a club-lounge, a twin-unit dining car, and new 7-2 (7 compartments, 2 drawing rooms) sleeping cars from Pullman. The weekly extra-fare Santa Fe de Luxe in 1911 overshadowed the California Limited, but it remained a popular train. The introduction of the Chief in 1926 eclipsed the California Limited, although the train ran for another three decades.

In October 1953, it was scheduled to leave Los Angeles at 1815 with coaches and sleepers—no diner and no lounge. A breakfast stop was scheduled at Seligman, a lunch stop at Winslow, and a dinner stop at Albuquerque. Next morning, at La Junta, it would add a diner for the rest of the run to Chicago (scheduled arrival 0830). It ran via Pasadena, Great Bend and Topeka.

=== Timeline ===
- October 1892: The Pullman Company delivers five six-car trainsets for the California Limited.
- November 27, 1892: Regular service begins.
- 1893: The train receives four new dining cars designed by Barney & Smith.
- May 4, 1896: Service suspended.
- November 1896: Regular service resumes.
- November 1898: Westward schedule drops to 67 hr 50 min, about as good as it ever did until it dropped to 63 hours in June 1929.
- 1899: The Limited is reduced to four trains per week.
- 1902: The train resumes daily service on a 68-hour schedule.
- July 1923: Walt Disney leaves Kansas City for Los Angeles aboard the California Limited, arriving at La Grande Station. His brother, Roy O. Disney, was then living at a veteran's hospital in Sawtell, Calif., west of Los Angeles.
- April 1, 1938: The Limited is suspended.
- May 22, 1938: Regular service resumes.
- September 4, 1945: The second section of Train No. 4 enters a siding near milepost 126 in the City of Santa Anita, California at excessive speed and derails. Some 200 people are injured, five fatally. One cleanup worker dies the following day in a freak accident.
- January 10, 1954: The California Limited is rerouted from the northern mainline (via La Junta) to the southern mainline via Amarillo.
- June 15, 1954: The California Limited is discontinued and replaced by the San Francisco Chief. Unnamed trains 3/4 continued to operate between Kansas City and Belen, connecting with the Kansas City Chief at Kansas City
- September 26, 1954: Trains 3/4 rerouted in New Mexico, becoming Kansas City–Carlsbad trains
- April 24, 1955: Trains 3/4 rerouted again, becoming Kansas City–Los Angeles trains The trains were cut back to Gallup–Kansas City in 1957 or 1958
- October 19, 1967: Trains 3/4, by then primarily mail trains carrying a single coach, are discontinued. The Interstate Commerce Commission later withdrew permission to discontinue the trains because the Santa Fe did not wait the required 30 days; however, the trains were not reinstated.

Currently the Southwest Chief operated by Amtrak, a descendant of the famous and legendary Santa Fe's Chief trains, uses the #3 (westbound) and #4 (eastbound) numbers originally assigned to California Limited.

== Equipment ==
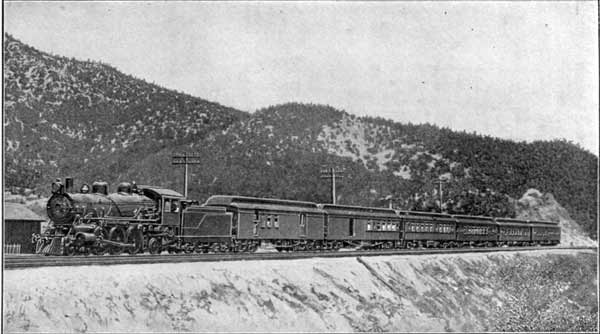
The California Limited pauses at the summit of Cajon Pass in 1908.

A variety of steam and diesel locomotives pulled the California Limited.

In 1892, the California Limited consisted of heavyweight cars built by Pullman-Standard. Each train contained:

- a compartment and drawing-room Sleeping car
- a Dining car that served "the best Fred Harvey meals on rails"
- a Club car / Parlor car
- a full-compartment Sleeping car
- a compartment drawing-room Sleeping car
- a combination 10-compartment Sleeping car / open-end Observation car

== See also ==
- Passenger train service on the Atchison, Topeka and Santa Fe Railway
