= Scout (train) =

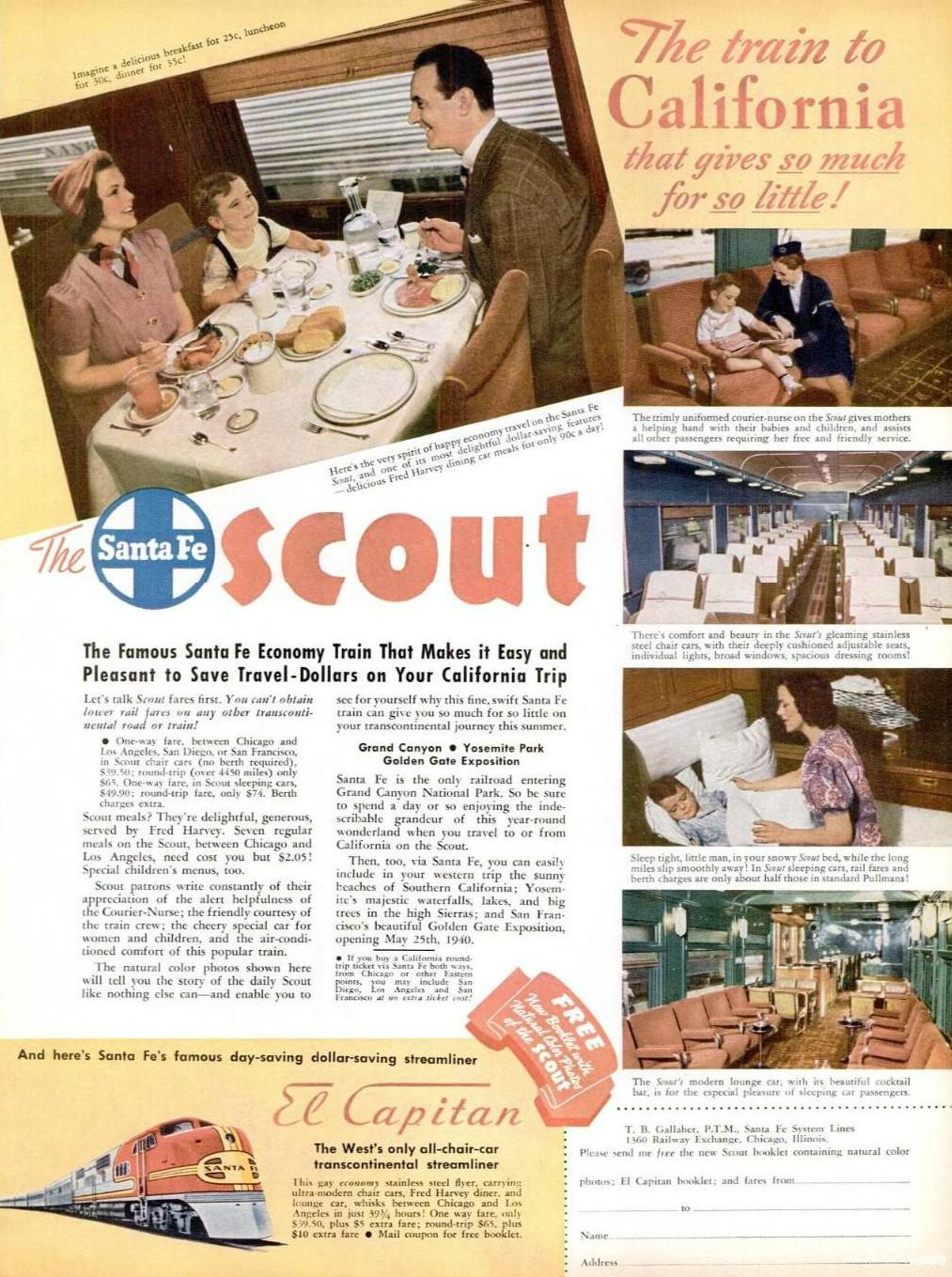
- Ad in Life Magazine, April 1940

Overview
- Service type: Inter-city rail
- Status: Discontinued
- Locale: Western United States
- First service: January 16, 1916
- Last service: 1948
- Successor: El Capitan, San Francisco Chief; Unnamed local services
- Former operator(s): Atchison, Topeka, and Santa Fe Railway

Route
- Termini: Chicago, Illinois; Los Angeles, California and Oakland, California
- Service frequency: Daily
- Train number(s): 1: westbound 2: eastbound (1920–1921); 10: eastbound (1916–1920, 1921–1948)

On-board services
- Seating arrangements: Chair Cars (1946)
- Sleeping arrangements: Sections, Double Bedrooms, Compartments, Drawing room Tourist sleeper (1946)
- Catering facilities: Dining car
- Observation facilities: Dormitory Lounge Car

Technical
- Track gauge: 1,435 mm (4 ft 8 1/2 in)

The Scout was one of the named passenger trains of the Atchison, Topeka and Santa Fe Railway. It started as train Nos. 1 (westbound) & 10 (eastbound) between Chicago, Illinois and Los Angeles, California. Inaugurated on January 16, 1916, this "budget" heavyweight train had tourist sleeping cars with upper and lower berths, "chair" cars (coaches) and an open-end observation car.

The train was assigned Nos. 1 & 2 in 1920 and reverted to Nos. 1 & 10 a year later. In summer 1926 it left Chicago at 1115 and arrived Los Angeles at 0900 three days later, running via Ottawa Jct, Amarillo and Fullerton. In November 1939 it left at 2045 and arrived 0700, sixty hours on the same route except via Pasadena.

The Scout made its last run in 1948.

== History ==
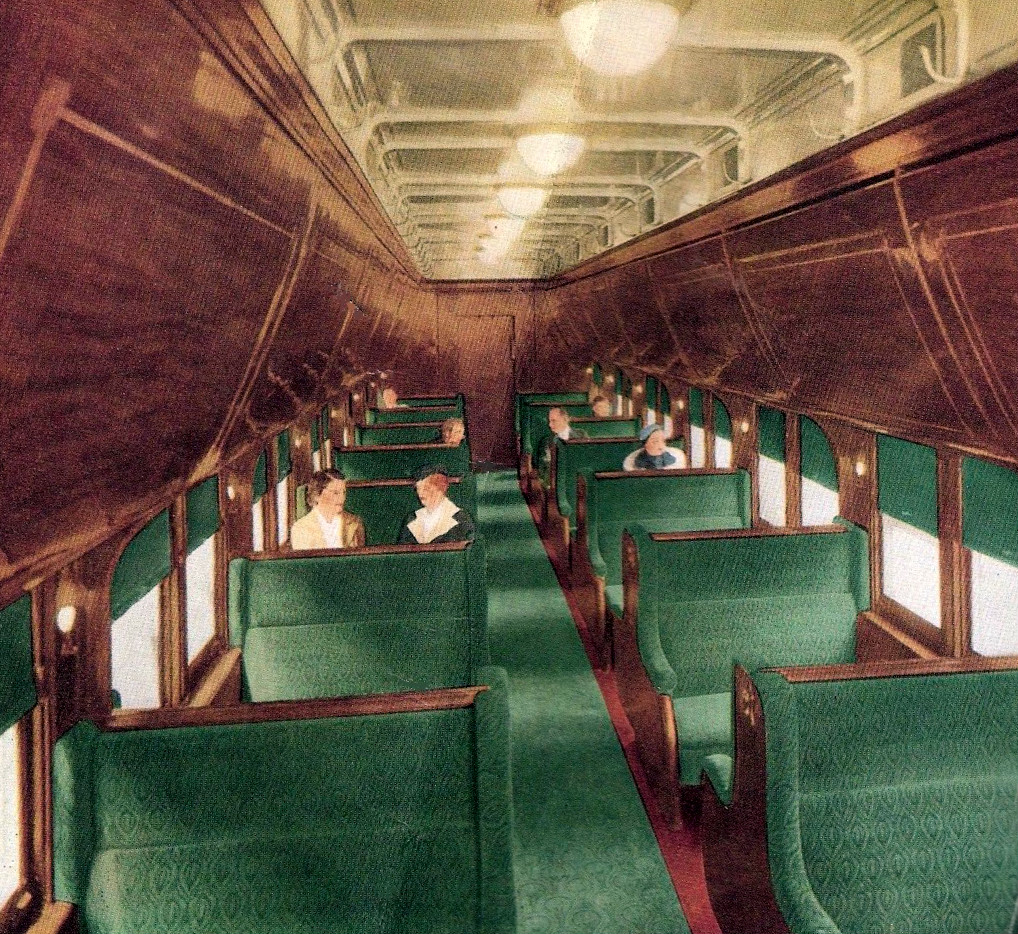
A sleeping car in day mode, 1937.

=== Timeline ===
- January 19, 1916: The Scout commences operation.
- 1920: The eastbound Scout is assigned No. 2, but becomes No. 10 the following year.
- January 4, 1931: The Scout is discontinued during the Great Depression. Thereafter, economy service was provided by the Hopi, the Missionary, and the Navajo.
- May 10, 1936: The "new" (renovated) Scout resumes. The westbound trip was completed in 60 hours, 15 minutes, while the eastbound schedule was reduced to 58 hours, 35 minutes.
- 1948: The Scout is withdrawn as passengers prefer to use Santa Fe's streamlined trains.

== Major stations ==
Major stations on the main itinerary to Los Angeles Union Station:

- Chicago, Illinois
- Kansas City, Missouri
- Wichita, Kansas
- Amarillo, Texas
- Clovis, New Mexico, point from which sections diverted to Carlsbad Caverns
- Belen, New Mexico, a short distance south of Albuquerque
- Williams, Arizona, transfer point for bus connection to Grand Canyon
- San Bernardino, California
- Pasadena
- Los Angeles

=== Oakland section major stations ===
West of Barstow, in eastern California, a second section departed northwest to the California Central Valley and Oakland:

- Bakersfield
- Fresno
- Merced
- Stockton
- Richmond
- Berkeley
- Oakland

== See also ==
- Passenger train service on the Atchison, Topeka and Santa Fe Railway
