= Santa Fe de Luxe =

Passenger train

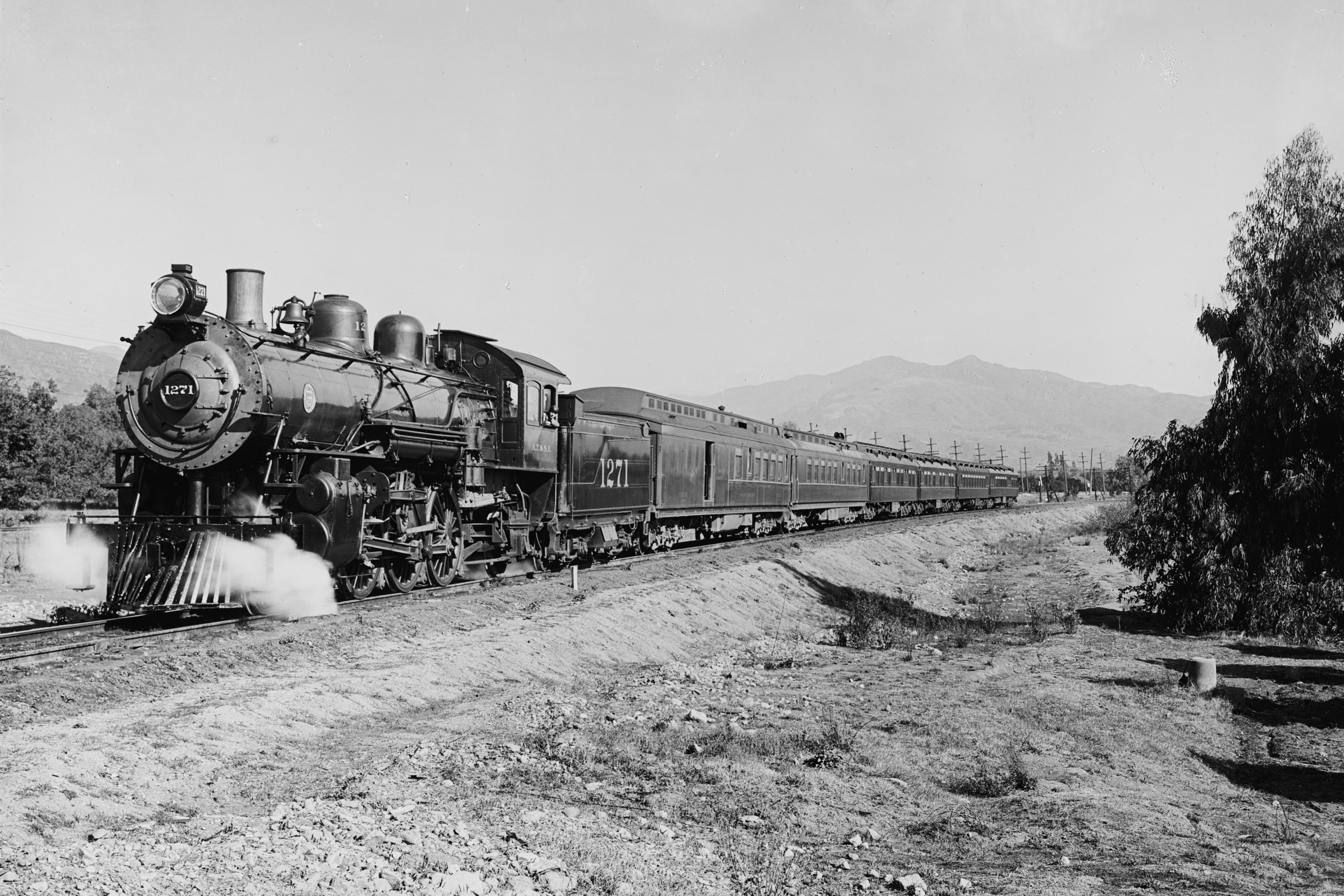

Overview
- First service: December 12, 1911
- Last service: May 1, 1917
- Successor: Chiefs
- Former operator(s): Atchison, Topeka and Santa Fe Railway

Route
- Termini: Chicago; Los Angeles

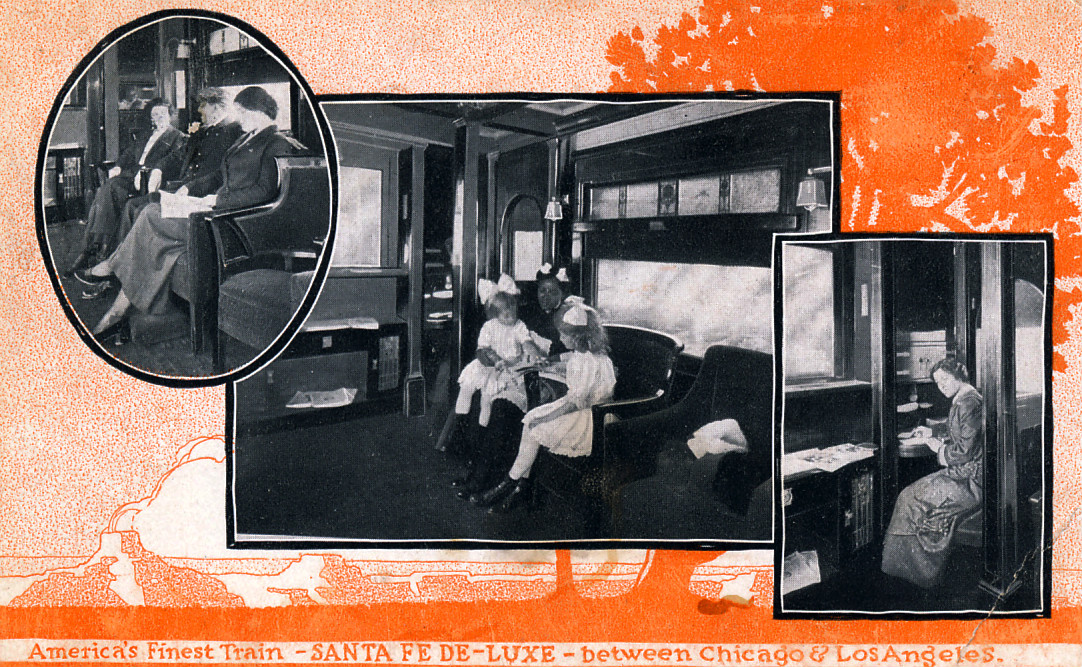
Postcard promotion for the train in 1916. Among the amenities it offered were maid and barber service.

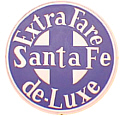
"Drumhead" logos such as this often adorned the ends of observation cars on the Santa Fe de Luxe.

The Santa Fe de Luxe was the first extra-fare named passenger train on the Atchison, Topeka and Santa Fe Railway.

The de Luxe (meaning something luxurious, or elegant) started on December 12, 1911, on a seasonal weekly schedule between Chicago, Illinois, and Los Angeles, California. It was the first train the Santa Fe called "Extra Fast - Extra Fine - Extra Fare." It was conceived by company president Edward Payson Ripley as the Santa Fe equivalent to the 20th Century Limited (New York Central) and Broadway Limited (Pennsylvania Railroad).

The trip took 63 hours each way and the sixty passengers paid a surcharge of $25 each way. Passengers could only board in Chicago, Los Angeles, Kansas City, or at Williams, Arizona (where those heading to the Grand Canyon boarded a train of the Grand Canyon Railway.

On arrival at Summit in Cajon Pass in California eastbound passengers were presented with orchid corsages (for the ladies) and engraved pigskin wallets (for the men). On the westbound run, ladies received a bouquet of flowers and a basket of California oranges, while the men got the usual wallet.

The de Luxe was not essential to the war effort and was withdrawn on May 1, 1917.

== Equipment used ==
It took the Pullman Company almost a year to design and build the 12 heavyweight steel underframe cars of the two identical consists of the de Luxe, one of which was:

- Baggage-Club-Lounge (also included a barber shop and library) #1328 San Gabriel
- Fred Harvey Company Diner #1434
- Sleeper (7 drawing rooms) Pima
- Sleeper (7 drawing rooms) Piute
- Sleeper (7 compartments, 2 drawing rooms) Vaca
- Sleeper (7 compartments, 2 drawing rooms) Walpi
- Observation-Parlor El Quivira

The cars were lavishly furnished and had electric lighting. Drawing room passengers slept in brass beds instead of the usual berths. The dining cars featured the first attempt at air conditioning on rail passenger cars; the dining room was cooled in the summer with large blocks of ice.

The trains were pulled by the best available of the road's passenger pool locomotives. On the prairie districts of Illinois, Missouri and Kansas, most divisions saw fast 4-4-2 "Atlantic"-type engines assigned. On many of the western mountain districts, 4-6-2 "Pacific"-type steam locomotives were used, with helpers added over the toughest grades.

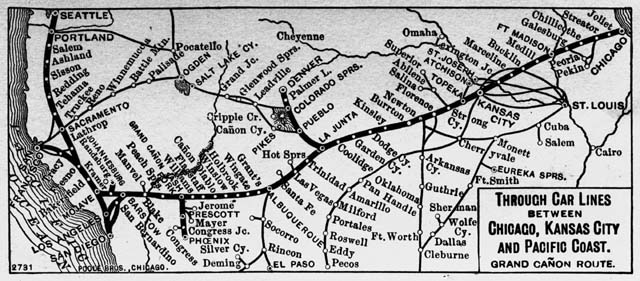
A map depicting the "Grand Canyon Route" of the Atchison, Topeka & Santa Fe Railway circa 1901.

== See also ==
- Passenger train service on the Atchison, Topeka and Santa Fe Railway
