= El Capitan (train) =

Passenger train

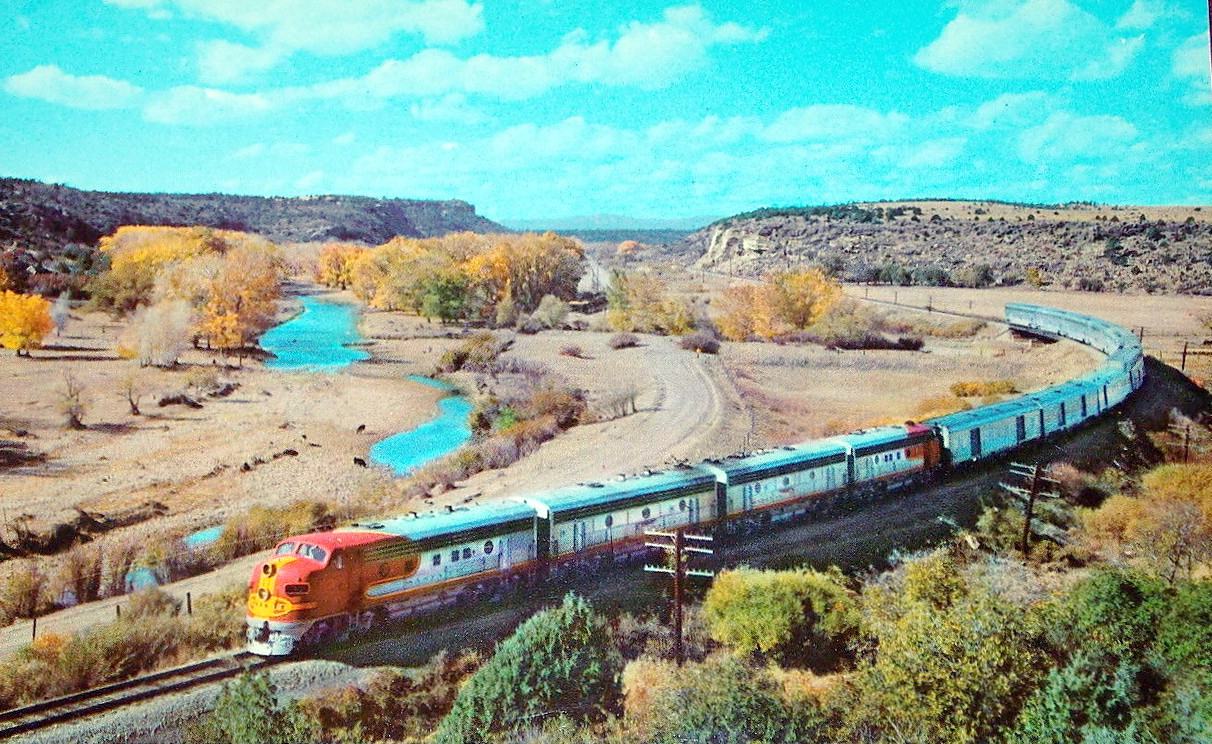
- The El Capitan depicted on a 1950s postcard at some point after receiving its Hi-Level equipment

Overview
- Service type: Inter-city rail
- Status: Discontinued
- Locale: Midwestern and Southwestern United States
- First service: February 22, 1938
- Last service: April 29, 1973
- Successor: Southwest Chief
- Former operator(s): Santa Fe; Amtrak (1971–1973)

Route
- Termini: Chicago; Los Angeles
- Average journey time: 39 hrs 30 min
- Train number(s): 21 and 22
- Line(s) used: Southern Transcon

Technical
- Track gauge: 4 ft 8 1/2 in (1,435 mm) standard gauge

The El Capitan was a streamlined passenger train operated by the Atchison, Topeka and Santa Fe Railway ("Santa Fe") between Chicago, Illinois, and Los Angeles, California. It operated from 1938 to 1971; Amtrak retained the name until 1973. The El Capitan was the only all-coach or "chair car" (non-Pullman sleeper) to operate on the Santa Fe main line between Chicago and Los Angeles on the same fast schedule as the railroad's premier all-Pullman Super Chief. It was also the first train to receive the pioneering Hi-Level equipment with which it would become synonymous.

== History ==
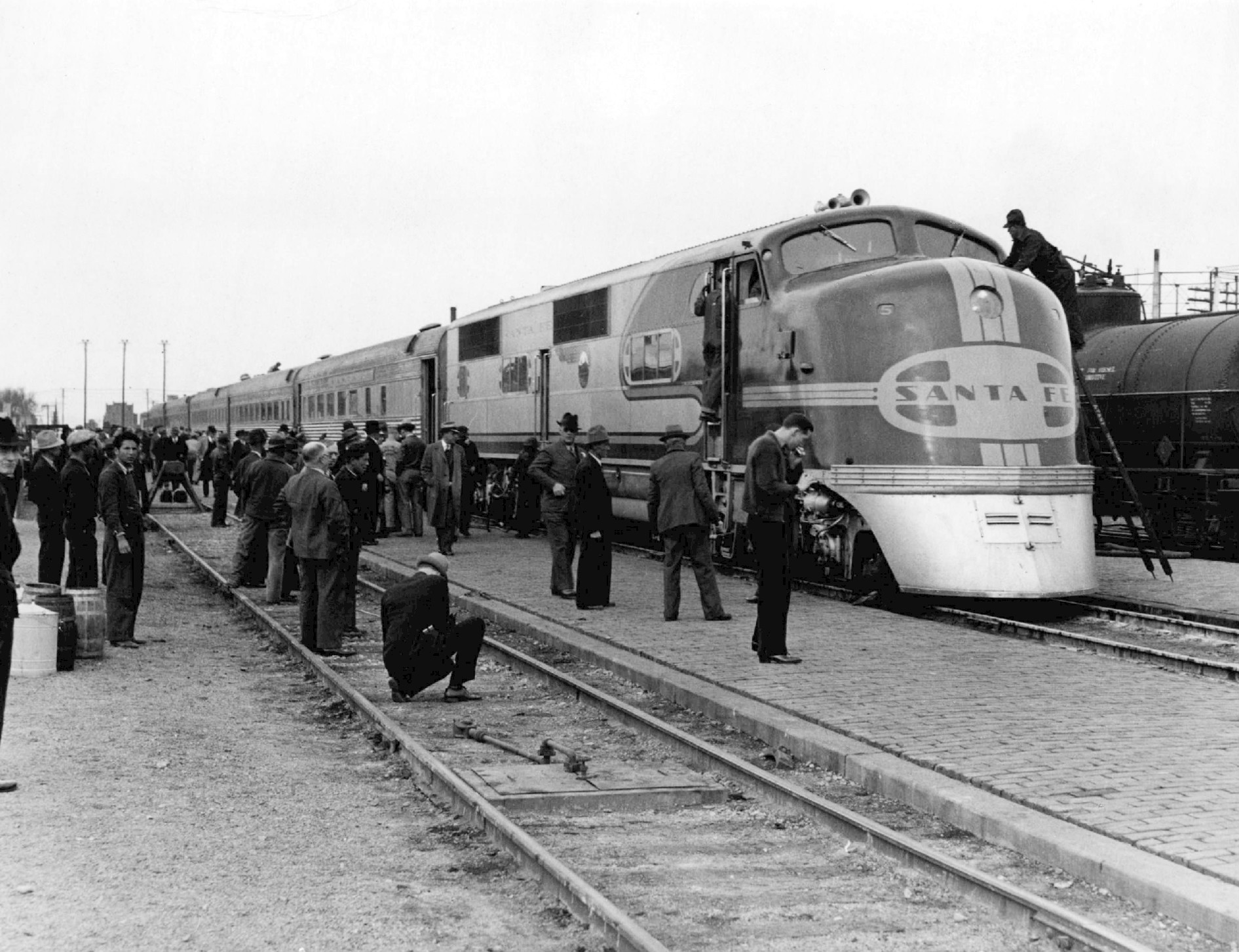
The new El Capitan at Albuquerque, New Mexico, on March 1, 1938

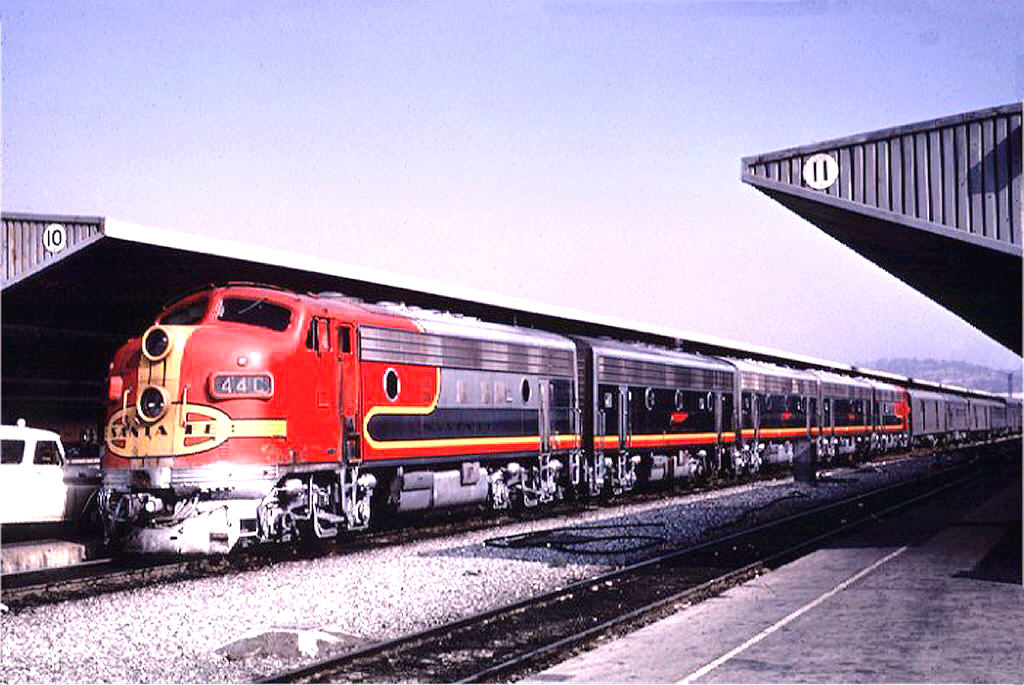
The combined Super Chief / El Capitan, led by EMD F7s in the Warbonnet paint scheme, pulls into Track 10 at Los Angeles' Union Passenger Terminal (LAUPT) on September 24, 1966.

The El Capitan debuted on February 22, 1938, on a twice-weekly schedule, using two five-car sets of streamlined equipment built by the Budd Company. Like the Pennsylvania Railroad's Trail Blazer, it offered "low-cost passage with high-speed convenience". The fare from Chicago to Los Angeles was $5.00 above the $39.50 regular coach fare in 1938.

Originally conceived as the Economy Chief, the name "El Capitan" was chosen to commemorate the Spanish conquistadors; it competed for passenger traffic with Union Pacific's Challenger. Unique in charging an extra fare despite being a coach train, it pioneered such features as "RideMaster" seats optimized for sleeping.

On its inaugural run the El Capitan left the main line at Williams and traveled up the Grand Canyon Railway to Grand Canyon Depot. In regular operation passengers bound for the Grand Canyon would connect at Williams.

An EMD F3 #19, assigned to that day's El Capitan, smashed through a concrete barrier at Los Angeles Union Station in January 1948

In its first year and a half the El Capitan ran at 80% capacity, superior to similar services. Reservations had to be made weeks in advance. In 1942 the consist expanded to 12 cars. Heavy traffic during World War II forced the Santa Fe to lengthen the train's schedule by two hours in July 1942; it restored the old schedule on June 2, 1946. On September 29, 1946, the El Capitan began running every other day, departing Los Angeles and Chicago on odd-numbered days (except the 31st). Together with the Super Chief on even-numbered days, the two trains formed what the Santa Fe billed as "the first and only daily 39 3/4 hour service between Chicago and California". On January 25, 1948, one of the locomotives assigned to the El Capitan crashed through a steel bumper post and concrete wall at Los Angeles' Union Passenger Terminal, ending with the locomotive dangling about 20 feet above Aliso Street. In 1948 the Santa Fe received additional equipment which permitted the Super Chief and El Capitan to start operating daily; the new schedules went into effect on February 29. The extra-fare charges were dropped from both El Capitan and the Chief on December 14, 1953.

El Capitan was one of the first Santa Fe trains to use the Budd-built "Big Dome"-Lounge cars. These were soon given to the Chief (another AT&SF Chicago-to-Los Angeles special), and replaced by new double-decker "Hi-Level" chair cars (coaches) developed by Budd and the railroad in 1954–1956. These experimental cars had a quieter ride, increased seating capacities, and better views.

The Santa Fe combined the Super Chief and El Capitan on January 12, 1958. The combined train used the Super Chief's numbers, 17 and 18, but the Santa Fe continued to use both names. On its formation Amtrak continued the combined Super Chief/El Capitan designation until April 29, 1973, when it dropped the El Capitan portion. Today the route of the El Capitan is served by Amtrak's Southwest Chief. Many Amtrak trains used a combination of refurbished former Santa Fe Hi-Level cars with newer Superliner railcars until the early 2000s.

== Equipment ==
Sample consists
February 1938
- Train: Original consists
- Locomotive: EMC E1 Locomotive #5 / #6; Baggage-Dormitory-Chair car (32 seats) #3480 / #3481; Chair car (52 seats) #3103 / #3104; Lunch Counter-Diner #1505 / #1506; Chair car (52 seats) #3105 / #3106; Round-end Chair car / Observation (50 seats) #3198 / #3199

Summer 1956
- Train: Westbound #21
- Locomotives: 4 x EMD F3/EMD F7; Baggage (storage mail); Baggage; Baggage-Dormitory (transition car); Hi-Level Step Down Chair Car (68 seats); Hi-Level Chair Car (72 seats); Hi-Level Chair Car (72 seats); Hi-Level Diner; Hi-Level Lounge; Hi-Level Chair Car (72 seats); Hi-Level Chair Car (72 seats); Hi-Level Chair Car (72 seats); Hi-Level Step Down Chair Car (68 seats)

The El Capitan debuted in February 1938 with consists of two all-lightweights manufactured by the Budd Company. Each included a baggage-dormitory-coach, two coaches, a lunch counter-dining car, and coach-observation car. The baggage-dormitory-coach had a small baggage area forward, followed by bunks for the train's crew and 32 coach seats. Both coaches seated 52 and featured men's and women's restrooms at opposite ends. In the observation car the restrooms were located forward, followed by 50 coach seats. During periods of high demand additional cars were added from the Scout's pool. The Santa Fe also employed its experimental pendulum car.

Between 1946 and 1948, the Santa Fe increased the length of the El Capitan and added new cars built during and after World War II. The new El Capitan included a storage mail car, baggage-dormitory, eight 44-seat "leg-rest" coaches, two lunch counter-dining cars, a club-lounge, and a coach-observation car. Most of the coaches were built by Pullman-Standard. The reduced seating in the coaches was given over to improved leg room for passengers.

Between 1954 and 1956, the El Capitan's consist included the "Big Dome"-Lounge that replaced the mid-train club-lounge car. On July 15, 1956, the new, "Hi-Level" streamliner consist debuted. Santa Fe purchased enough "Hi-Level" equipment for consists of five nine-cars. Six of the railroad's older baggage-dormitory cars had a cosmetic fairing applied to the rear roofline to create the distinctive "transition" cars and maintain a streamlined appearance on the El Capitan. The real transition cars were the 68-seat step down chair cars, which had a regular-height diaphragm at one end and a high-level at the other. The dining cars rode on six-wheel trucks due to their massive weight (all other cars rode on four-wheel trucks). The "Big Domes" were transferred to the Chief pool.

As on many "named" long haul trains of the era, the rear of the observation car bore a lighted "drumhead". These signs included "El Capitan" in a distinctive logotype with the railroad's logo.

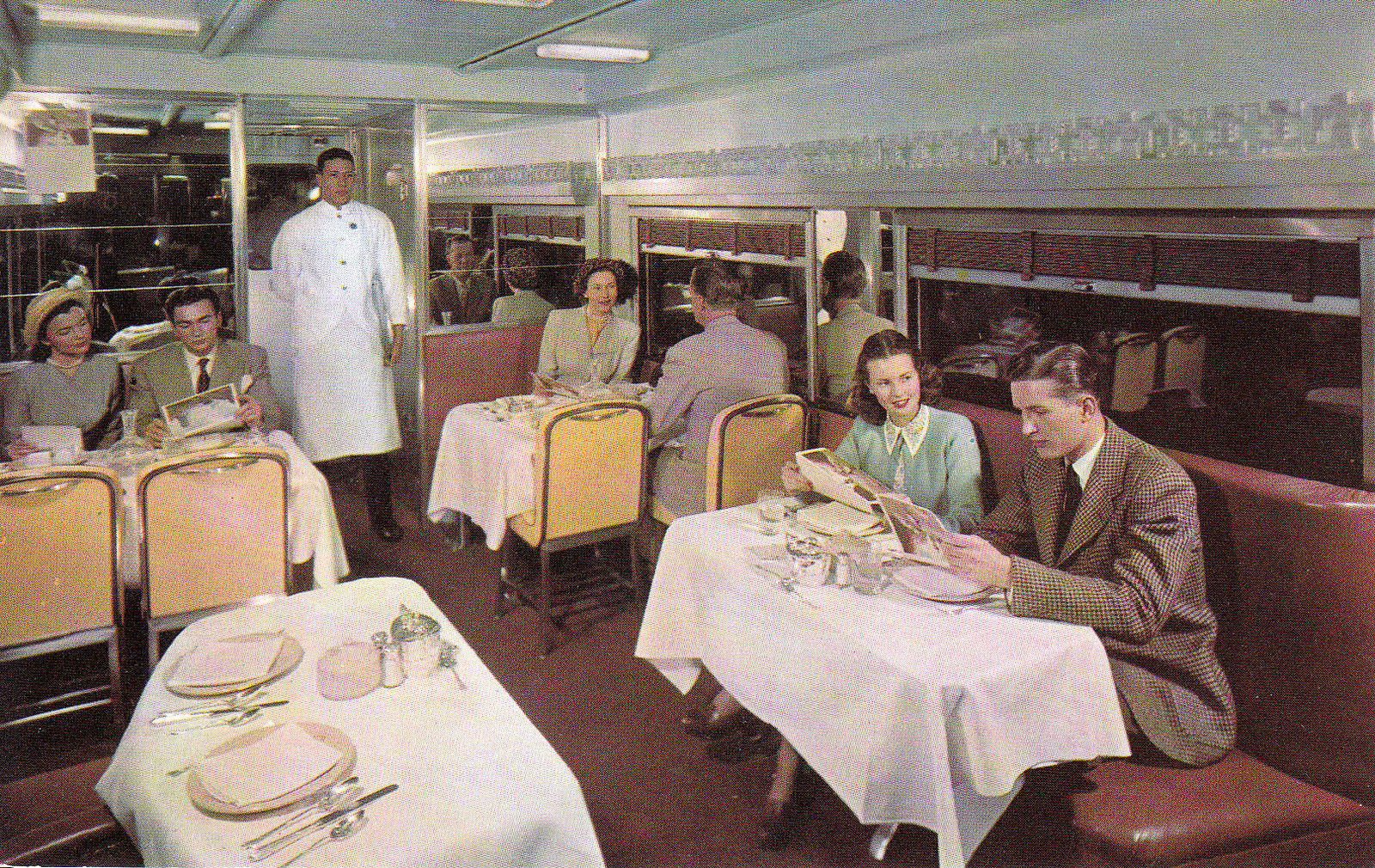
Pre-1956 El Capitan diner

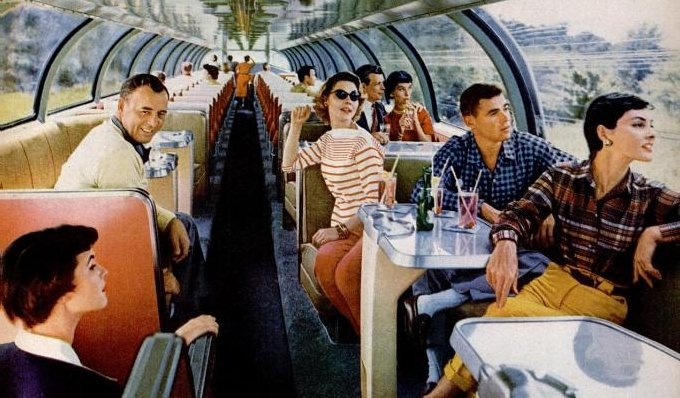
The Big Dome car, 1954

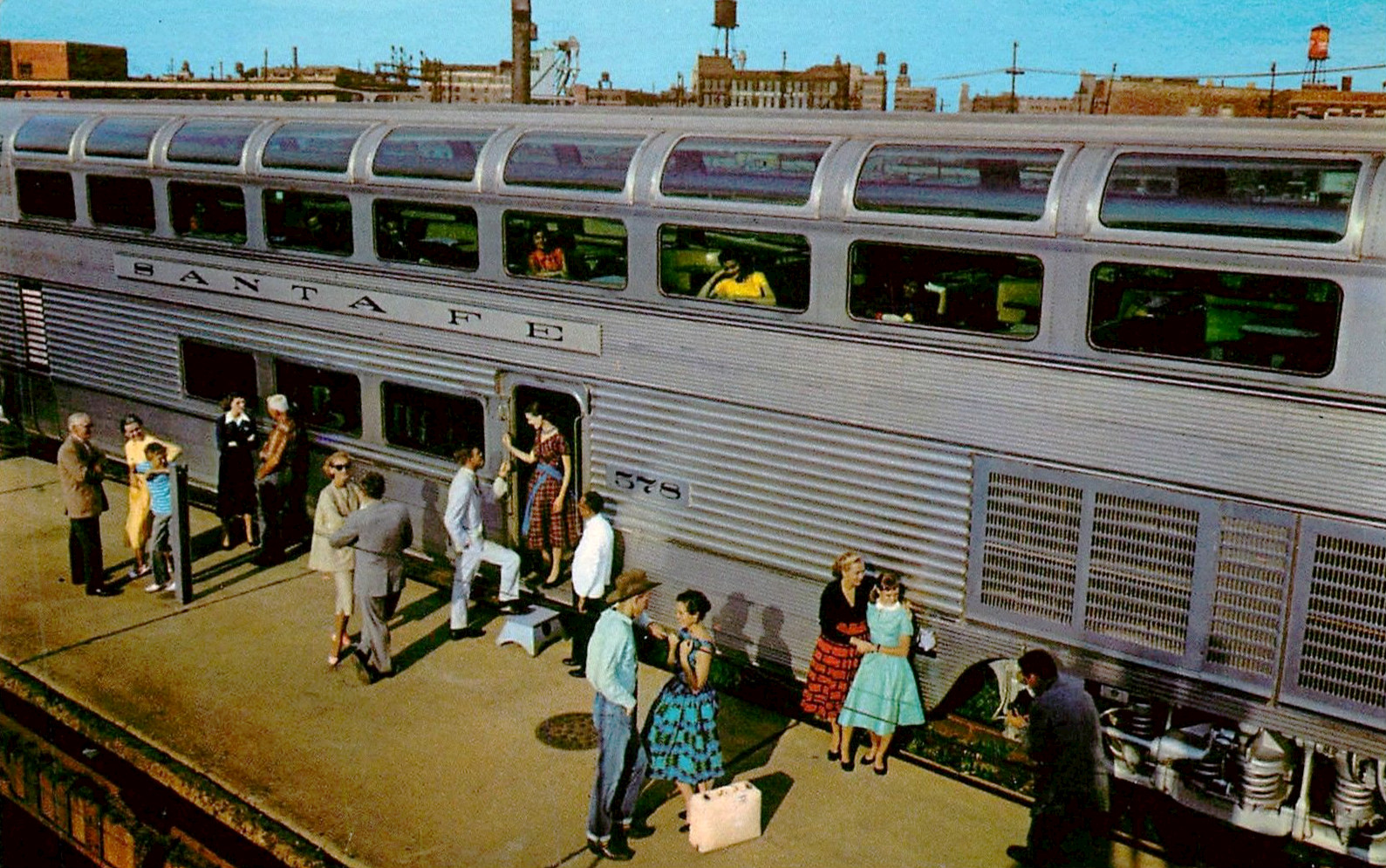
Passenger boarding on one Hi-Level car

== See also ==
- Amtrak Southwest Chief
- Passenger train service on the Atchison, Topeka and Santa Fe Railway
