= San Francisco Chief =

Former streamlined passenger train

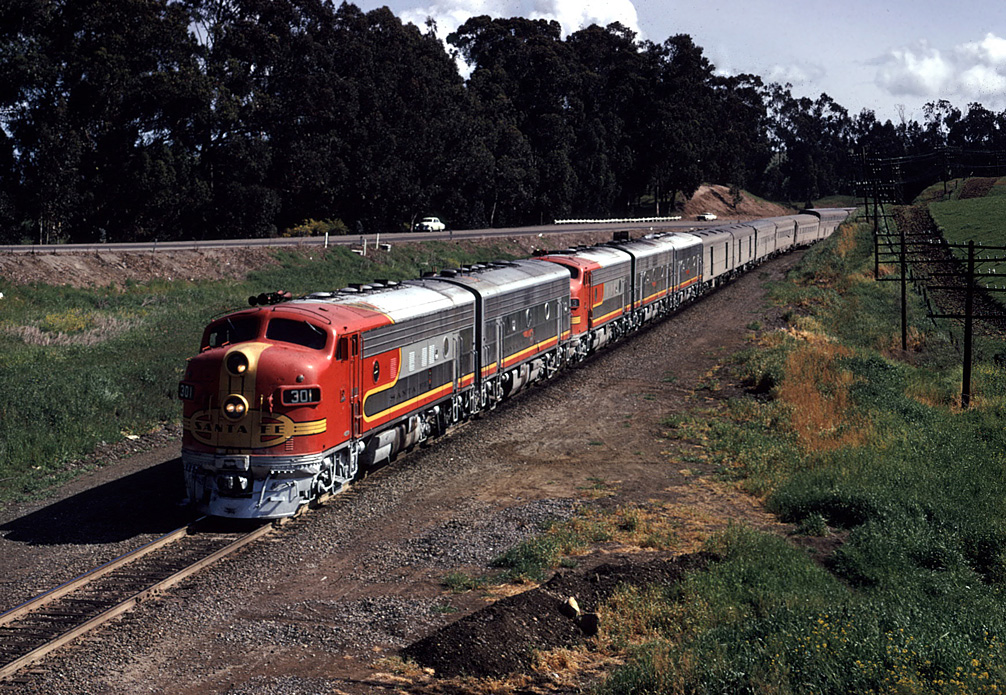
- EMD F7s lead the San Francisco Chief west of Hercules, California, in April 1971, just prior to discontinuance. Note the mixture of single-level and Hi-Level equipment.

Overview
- Service type: Inter-city rail
- Status: Discontinued
- Locale: Western United States
- Predecessor: California Limited, Scout
- First service: June 6, 1954
- Last service: April 30, 1971
- Former operator: Atchison, Topeka, and Santa Fe Railway

Route
- Termini: Chicago, Illinois; Richmond, California (1965); Oakland, California (1954)
- Stops: 59 (westbound); 64 (eastbound)
- Average journey time: 48 hours, 45 minutes (westbound); 47 hours, 49 minutes (eastbound)
- Service frequency: Daily
- Train numbers: 1 and 2

On-board services
- Seating arrangements: Hi-Level Chair Cars; Chair Cars
- Sleeping arrangements: Roomettes; Double Bedrooms; Compartments
- Catering facilities: Lounge Diner
- Observation facilities: Big Dome Lounge Car

Technical
- Rolling stock: Hi-Level
- Track gauge: 1,435 mm (4 ft 8 1/2 in)
- Operating speed: 52.0 mph (83.7 km/h) (westbound); 52.9 mph (85.1 km/h) (eastbound)

The San Francisco Chief was a streamlined passenger train on the Atchison, Topeka, and Santa Fe Railway ("Santa Fe") between Chicago and the San Francisco Bay Area. It ran from 1954 until 1971. The San Francisco Chief was the last new streamliner introduced by the Santa Fe, its first full train between Chicago and the Bay, the only Chicago–Bay Area train running over just one railroad, and at 2,555 miles (4,112 km) the longest run in the country on one railroad. The San Francisco Chief was one of many trains discontinued when Amtrak began operations in 1971.

== History ==
The Santa Fe introduced the streamliner on June 6, 1954; it was Santa Fe's last new streamliner and its first direct train from Chicago to the San Francisco Bay Area. It ran via Topeka and the Belen Cutoff through Amarillo, Texas, instead of Raton Pass. Like other Santa Fe trains it ran to the Oakland, California, depot in Emeryville (cut back to Richmond, California, after 1958), with a bus connection across the bay to San Francisco, California. At first the San Francisco Chief handled through cars for cities in Texas, plus a New Orleans, Louisiana, sleeper conveyed by the Missouri Pacific Railroad in Houston, Texas. The San Francisco Chief carried the numbers 1 (westbound) and 2 (eastbound) and was the only Chicago–San Francisco train to make the entire journey on one railroad.

At the train's inauguration, Taptuka, a Hopi chief led the ceremony. The train used a mix of old and new lightweight cars, including full-length dome cars (called "Big Domes") built by the Budd Company. There were improved reclining chairs in the coaches, "classic and popular music...on individual, push-button type receivers," and bar service on the upper level of the dome car via a dumb waiter.

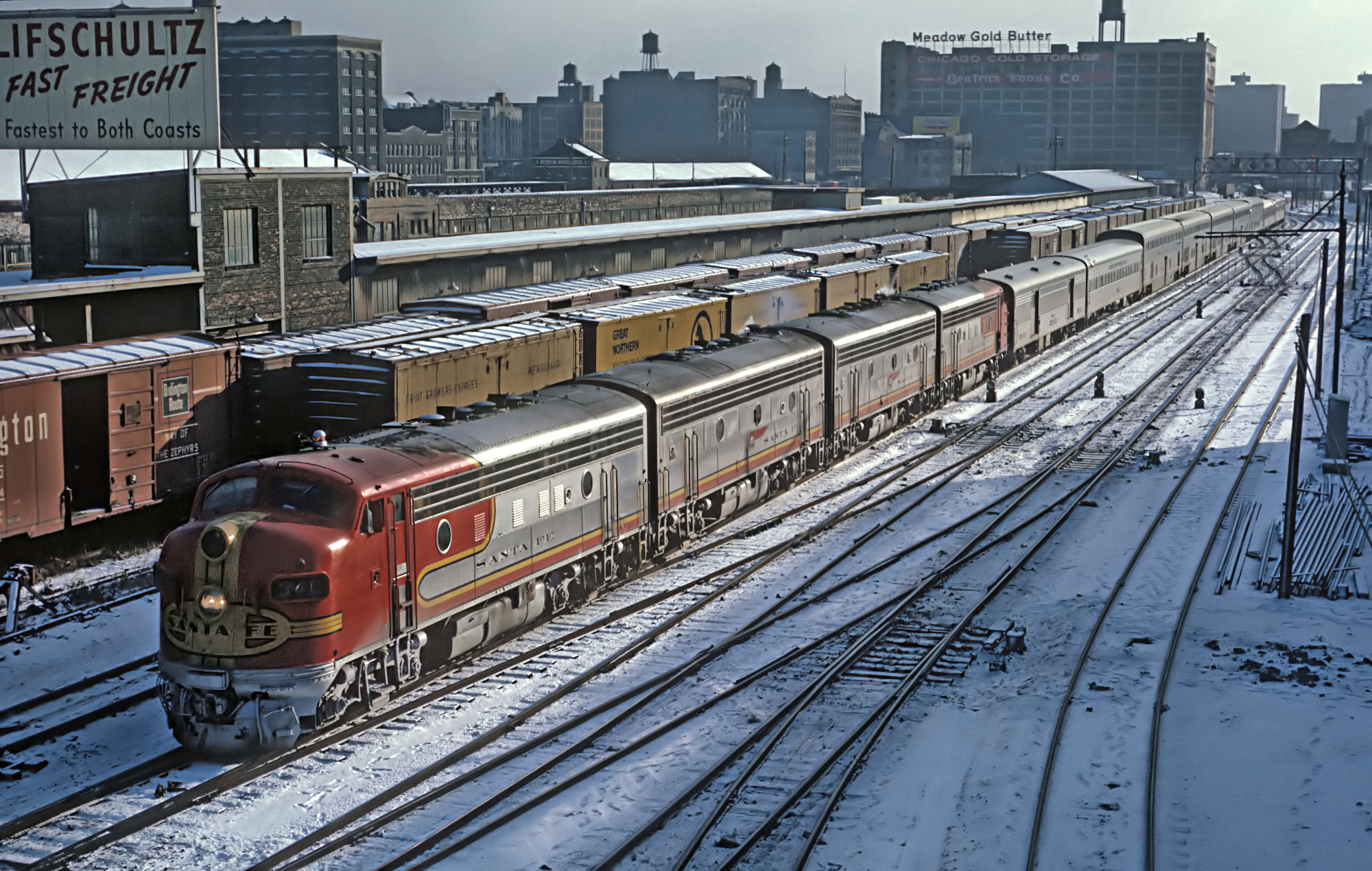
The San Francisco Chief at Chicago on December 26, 1967

Tragedy struck the train on March 2, 1960, just outside of Bakersfield, California, when a tanker truck filled with oil stalled or got stuck on a crossing along the Chief's route. The engineer hardly had time to slow down, and collided with the truck, resulting in an explosion that could be seen, heard and even felt over a great distance. 17 people were killed and around 60 were injured.

The San Francisco Chief was one of few Santa Fe trains to survive the purge in 1967–1968, as dozens of trains were discontinued. The discontinuances were prompted in large part by the cancellation of railway post office contracts in 1967. Another survivor, the Grand Canyon, provided through service to Los Angeles at Barstow, California. Amtrak chose the route of California Zephyr for Chicago–San Francisco service, and the San Francisco Chief made its last run on April 30, 1971.

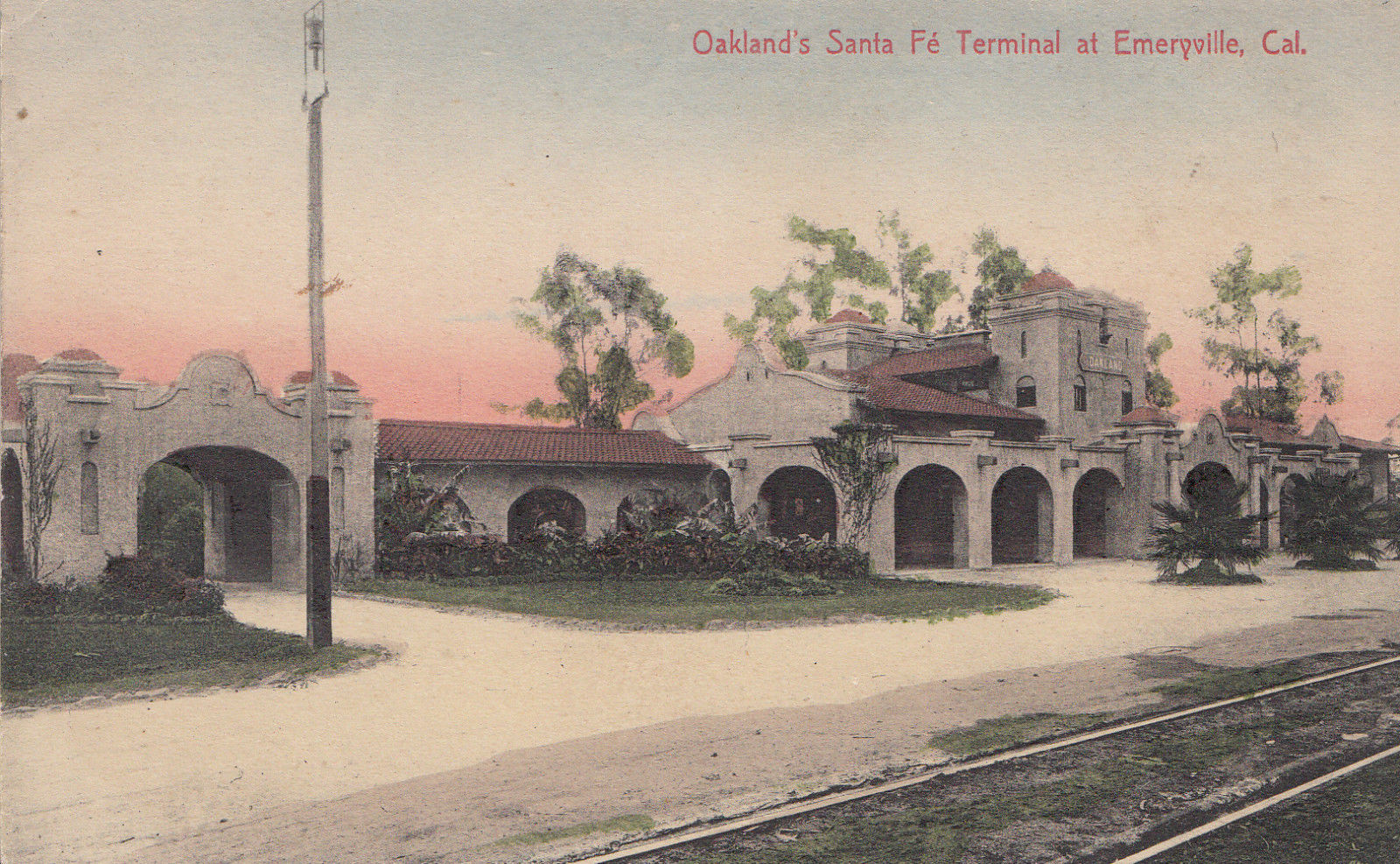
Oakland Santa Fe Terminal, destination in the train's early years

The discontinuance of the San Francisco Chief was the end of passenger service on the Belen Cutoff. Since 1971 there have been periodic discussions between Amtrak and the owners of that route (Santa Fe, then BNSF Railway) about re-routing the Super Chief, now the Southwest Chief, off the Raton Pass and on the cutoff. However, moving the train from its current route would deprive passengers of service at the Albuquerque and Santa Fe-Lamy stops.

== Equipment ==
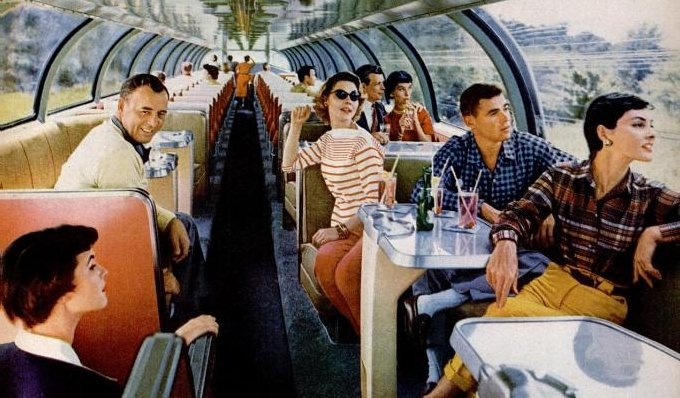
The lounge area of the upper level of a "Big Dome" in 1954

The San Francisco Chief was one of several Santa Fe trains to receive the new full-length "Big Dome" dome cars from the Budd Company. The upper level of each car seated 57 in chairs and 18 in a lounge area, while the lower level was given over to a bar-lounge. Its sleeping cars and diners were cast-offs from the Chief and other trains, while some of its coaches (which could seat 48) were new. In 1963–1964 the Santa Fe ordered 24 Hi-Level coaches for use on the San Francisco Chief.

In 1960 the San Francisco Chief carried "chair cars" (coaches), a "Big Dome" dome lounge, a dining car, and sleeping cars. The sleeping cars included sections, roomettes, double bedrooms, compartments, and drawing rooms. The train handled through sleepers from Tulsa, Oklahoma (to Chicago), Lubbock, Texas (to Chicago), and Dallas and Houston (to California) plus a set-out sleeper at Kansas City, Missouri. All chair car seats were reserved.
