= Chief (train) =

American passenger train (1926–1968)

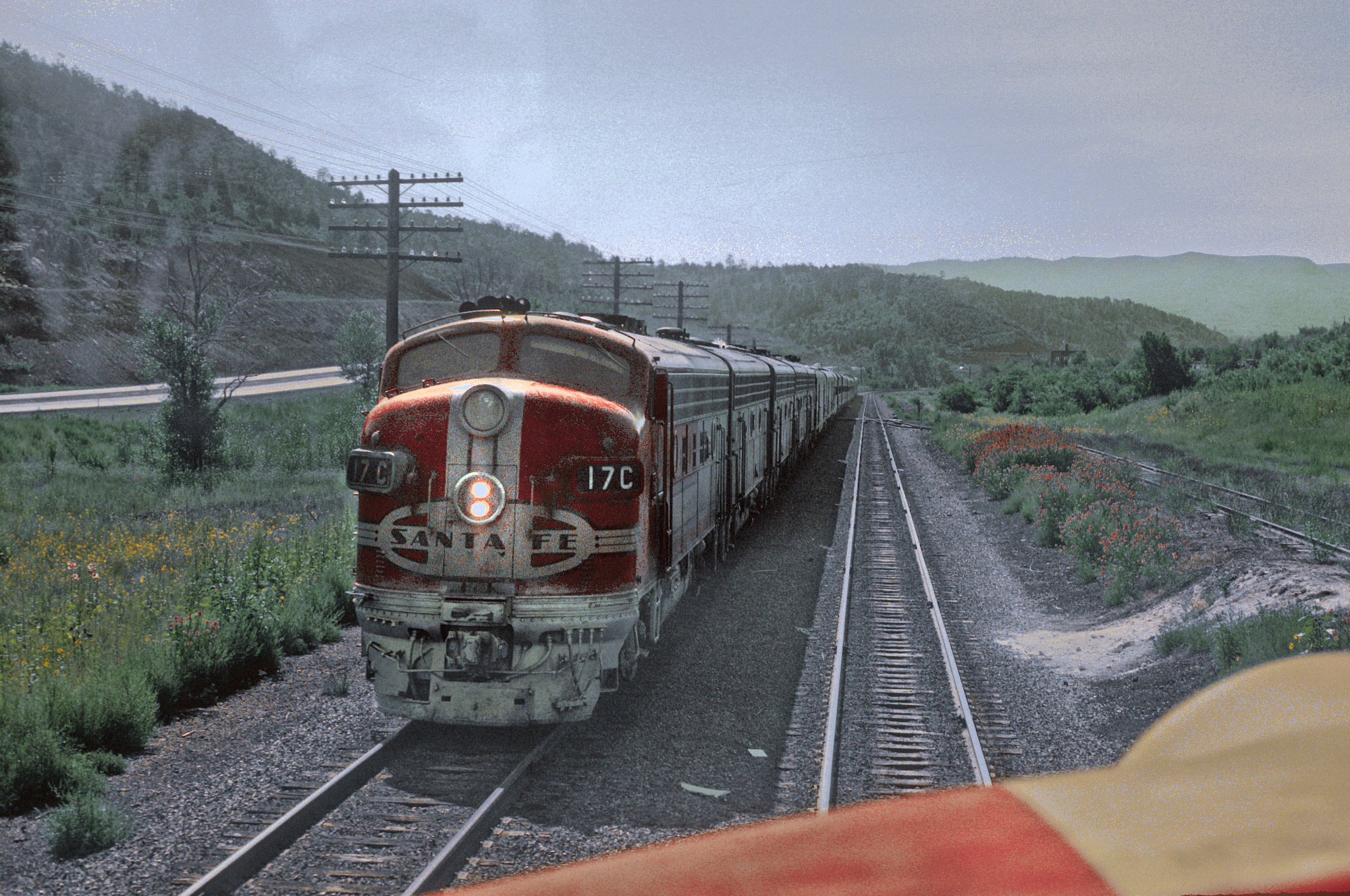
- The Chief in Morley, Colorado, August 1967

Overview
- Service type: Inter-city rail
- Status: Discontinued
- Locale: Midwestern and Southwestern United States
- First service: 1926
- Last service: May 15, 1968
- Successor: Super Chief/El Capitan
- Former operators: Santa Fe; Amtrak (1972)

Route
- Termini: Chicago; Los Angeles
- Average journey time: 39 hours 45 min (1954)
- Service frequency: Daily
- Train numbers: 19 and 20
- Line used: Southern Transcon

Technical
- Track gauge: 4 ft 8 1/2 in (1,435 mm) standard gauge

The Chief was an American long-distance named passenger train of the Atchison, Topeka and Santa Fe Railway that ran between Chicago, Illinois and Los Angeles, California. The Santa Fe initiated the Chief in 1926 to supplement the California Limited. In 1936 the Super Chief was introduced, after the Super Chief was relaunched in 1948 with daily departures from Los Angeles and Chicago it gradually eclipsed the Chief as the standard bearer of the Santa Fe because of its timetable oriented to the Raton Pass transit. For some the Chief and San Francisco Chief ( which inherited the Chief, Turquoise lounge and other features in 1968) as deluxe integrated trains with both Pullman sleepers and fully reclining coach seating with all facilities; lounges and pleasure domes, available to all passengers were at least equal flagships better suited to the business and executive market. From the mid 1960s the super Chief was only a small entirely separate section of the El Capitan seated vista train, the El Capitan passengers having no access to the Super Chiefs expensive eateries and bars which selling point was exclusion and service. The Chief was discontinued in 1968 due to high operating costs, competition from airlines, and the loss of Postal Office contracts.

Amtrak revived the Chief for three months in the summer of 1972 as a second daily Chicago–Los Angeles train (numbers 19 & 20). It complemented the combined Super Chief/El Capitan (numbers 3 & 4), running over the same route. Today, the Southwest Chief remains the only train serving the former route of the Chief.

== History ==
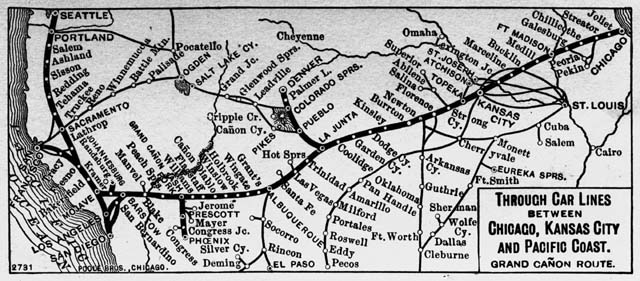
A map of the "Grand Canyon Route", c. 1901

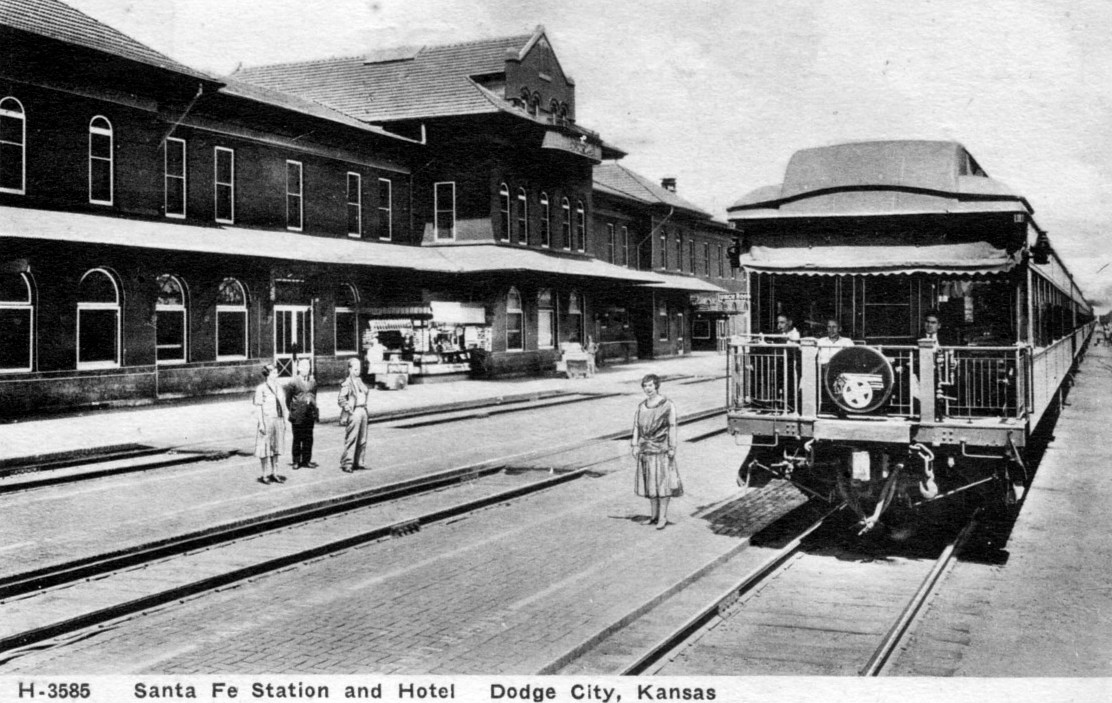
The Chief at the Dodge City station in Kansas in 1929

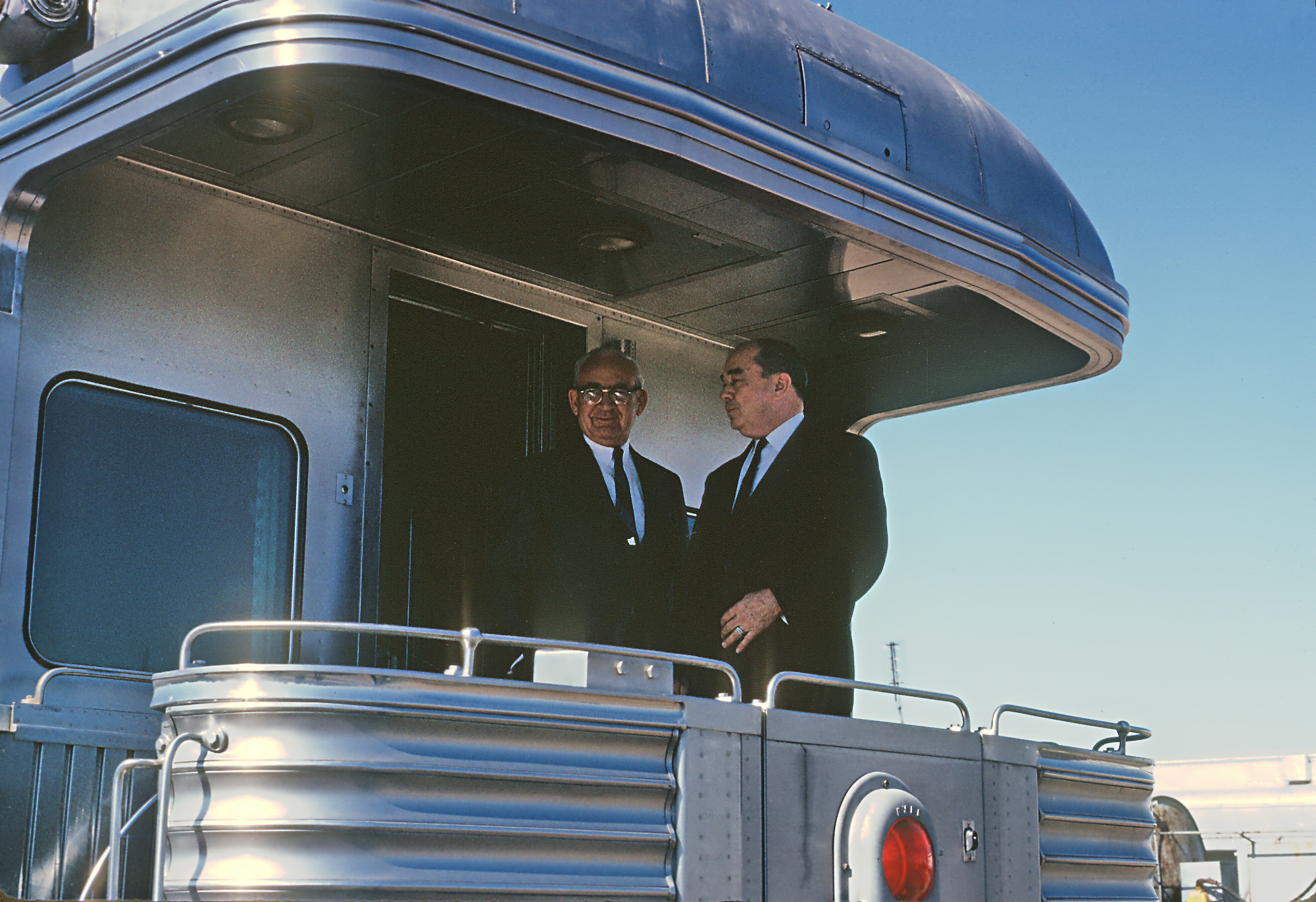
AT&SF President Ernest S. Marsh (right) aboard the Chief in 1966

In 1926 the Atchison, Topeka and Santa Fe Railway inaugurated the all-Pullman, extra-fare Chief as a supplement to the California Limited between Chicago and Los Angeles.

From 1948 to 1967 the Chief provided a connection at Chicago with the Pennsylvania Railroad's all-Pullman overnight Broadway Limited to Philadelphia and New York as well as the New York Central's 20th Century Limited / New England States to New York and Boston. The Chief left Chicago at 1.30pm from 1948 and at 10am from 1954 on an accelerated 37hr service with connecting sleepers from the 20th Limited and Broadway Limited (carried on the evening Super Chief in 1954-58, as a one-hour transfer between the Century's arrival and the Chief's departure was too tight for a through-car transfer) for Los Angeles and also Kansas City, Denver and Phoenix. Reaching Los Angeles before midnight the following day, the Chief was the only U.S. train offering one night transit Chicago-Los Angeles westbound from 1954 and two night, transcontinental travel from New York to Los Angeles. The Chief was inaugurated as an all-Pullman limited train to supplement the road's California Limited, with a surcharge of USD $10.00 for an end-to-end trip. The heavyweight began its first run from both ends of the line, simultaneously, on November 14, 1926, scheduled 63 hours each way between Chicago and Los Angeles, five hours faster than the California Limited. (The Overland Limited (Union Pacific), Los Angeles Limited (Union Pacific) and Golden State Limited (Rock Island Railroad and Southern Pacific) began their extra-fare 63-hour schedules between Chicago and California the same day.)

The Chief was a success, dubbed "Extra Fast-Extra Fine-Extra Fare" though it failed to relieve traffic on the California Limited. The Chief became famous as a "rolling boudoir" for film stars and Hollywood executives. In combination with the 20th Century Limited, the Chief was a favored mode of transcontinental travel for Hollywood. The stars and executives generally remained in their private room cars. Most of the Chief's patrons were middle class tourists or businessmen. In 1954, the Chief improved its schedule to 37 hours, equal to its cousins the Super Chief and El Capitan and would ultimately drop the extra fare requirement as well. The quality of dining, drinking and sleeping car comfort The Chief offered at a substantial price was far superior to later Amtrak trains. The Chief, leaving Chicago in the morning, ran through to Los Angeles in just one night, arriving at San Bernardino by 9pm and LA around 11 pm. The Westbound chief transited the Dodge City- Albuquerque section in darkness, missing the tourist vista of other Santa Fe trains. The Super Chief passed through Kansas and Missouri at night, leaving Chicago in the evening and running through two nights with the La Junta-Raton Pass Colorado section in daylight, arriving in Los Angeles in the morning. The last 60-mile run through the Los Angeles suburbs was slow, and many passengers concluded the trip unnoticed at San Bernardino or Pasadena.

The Chief would have been the "crown jewel" of most railroads' passenger fleets. But it did not survive the national decline in passenger demand, due to the faster transport provided by the Boeing 707 and Douglas DC-8 which overcame the airlines' previous inferior eight-hour Los Angeles-Chicago flights on propeller DC-6s, DC-7s and Constellations at 300 mph (480 km/h), only 3 miles high with a turbulent and dangerous crossing of the Grand Canyon. Ironically, fear of the Grand Canyon kept many stars on the Chief in the 1950s and early 1960s. However, the impact of jet aircraft; the exorbitant cost of train crew (who operated under old union rules of a day's pay for each 150 miles traveled while the Chief traveled 450 miles every 8 hours) and the loss in 1967 of most U.S. rail companies' contracts for carriage of first class U.S. mail Postal Department created a crisis for all U.S. railroads. Santa Fe recommended that all but its Super Chief, San Francisco Chief, Texas Chief and San Diegans be discontinued. In particular, Santa Fe informed the Interstate Commerce Commission that it could no longer afford to run four daily Chicago-California services. To Santa Fe's shock, the ICC ruled that the all-stops, common carrier Grand Canyon be continued rather than the Chief, which made its last run on May 15, 1968. The Grand Canyon was somewhat upgraded, leaving Chicago at 9 am on a 45-hour run to Los Angeles. The San Francisco Chief was rescheduled into the Chief's 10 am departure slot out of Chicago, running on the different Amarillo/Belen Cutoff route but offering 44-hour transit to Los Angeles or 41.5 hours to a shuttle transfer from San Bernardino or Bakersfield.

=== Timeline ===
- 1926: To supplement the California Limited, the Santa Fe inaugurates the all-Pullman, extra-fare Chief, running between Chicago and Los Angeles.
- November 14, 1926: The Chief makes its first departure from both ends of the line simultaneously.
- March 1928: The eastward schedule drops to 61 and a 1/4 hours.
- June 1929: The schedule both ways drop to 58 hours.
- 1937: The Santa Fe announces that the Chief will receive streamlined (lightweight) cars to replace the heavyweights and will run on a 50¾-hour schedule.
- February 22, 1938: About 10 new streamlined cars are placed into service.
- 1942: The consist of expands to 13 cars, and each average 743 daily miles.
- 1945: The train receives new cars, and the schedule is reduced to 45 hours.
- March 27, 1947: A sleeping car service direct to San Diego begins.
- Ca. 1953: The trains from Los Angeles met in a timed connection at La Junta, Colorado, with coach trains bound for Denver, with the reverse itinerary available.
- January 10, 1954: The 45-hour schedule is cut to 39 hours, 45 minutes eastbound and 39 hours, 30 minutes westbound, with a morning departure from Chicago. The westbound train spends only one night in transit, leaving Chicago in the morning and arriving in Los Angeles in the late evening of the following day. The fare surcharge is dropped after the Union Pacific introduces its competing Challenger train.
- January 1954: The Santa Fe transfers transcontinental sleeping car service to the Super Chief.
- 1954: Coaches are added to the Chief; observation cars are removed for the first time since the train's inauguration. The cars are blunt-ended at Pullman's Richmond, California, facility and returned to service in the new San Francisco Chief's consists as Pullman lounges. Cafe observation cars are added to the coach train from La Junta to Denver. Through sleeping cars are introduced for the branch from La Junta to Denver.
- September 5, 1956: A Santa Fe fireman from the waiting eastward Fast Mail Express throws a switch in front of the speeding Chief near Springer, New Mexico, causing it to enter the siding occupied by the Fast Mail Express and collide head-on. Both engine crews (save for the hapless Fast Mail fireman) are killed; a total of 20 train crew and Chief dining car employees are killed in the collision. Thirty-five passengers and crew members are injured.
- 1960: The eastward Chief begins running via Topeka.
- 1963-64: The westward train begins running via Topeka.
- May 15, 1968: The Chief ceases operations; the Santa Fe resurrects the name for a high-speed intermodal freight train: the Super C.
- Summer 1972: Amtrak revives the Chief for three months using Nos. 19 & 20 and the Chief's morning departure from Chicago.

=== Competing trains ===
In summer 1926, the fastest schedules between Chicago and San Francisco/Los Angeles were 68 hours. That November, four extra-fare ($10) all-Pullman trains started running on 63-hour schedules: the Chief, the Los Angeles Limited via Salt Lake, the Golden State Limited via El Paso, and the Overland Limited to San Francisco. In 1928, the four eastward trains dropped to 61 hours 15 minutes to improve connections at Chicago. In June 1929, the Chief and Overland Limited schedules dropped to 58 hours each way, leaving Chicago at 11 to 11:50 AM and Los Angeles/San Francisco at 9:45 PM/9:40 PM. The standard-fare schedule then became 63 hours westward and 61 1/4 hours eastward on seven routes from Chicago to the Coast (trains to Seattle now matching the standard-fare California trains). The Los Angeles Limited and Golden State Limited retained their 1928 schedules and so dropped their extra fares.

In 1931 the Overland Limited dropped its extra fare and combined with the 63-hour train on its route; the Chief was the only extra fare trans-continental train thereafter, until the streamliners. In February 1936 it was scheduled at 53 hours 45 minutes to Los Angeles, compared to 61 hours for the Los Angeles Limited, Golden State Limited and California Limited.

In May 1936 Union Pacific Railroad opened high speed Chicago - Los Angeles service with its City of Los Angeles Diesel streamliner. In December 1937 the original City of Los Angeles train was replaced by a full-sized 14 car train. The schedule was doubled to 10 times monthly in July 1938.

In 1954, for a continuous East Coast to Los Angeles trip (and the reverse), on the New York Central, Pennsylvania Railroad or Baltimore and Ohio trains, this opportunity was shifted from the Chief to the Santa Fe's Super Chief.

== Equipment used ==
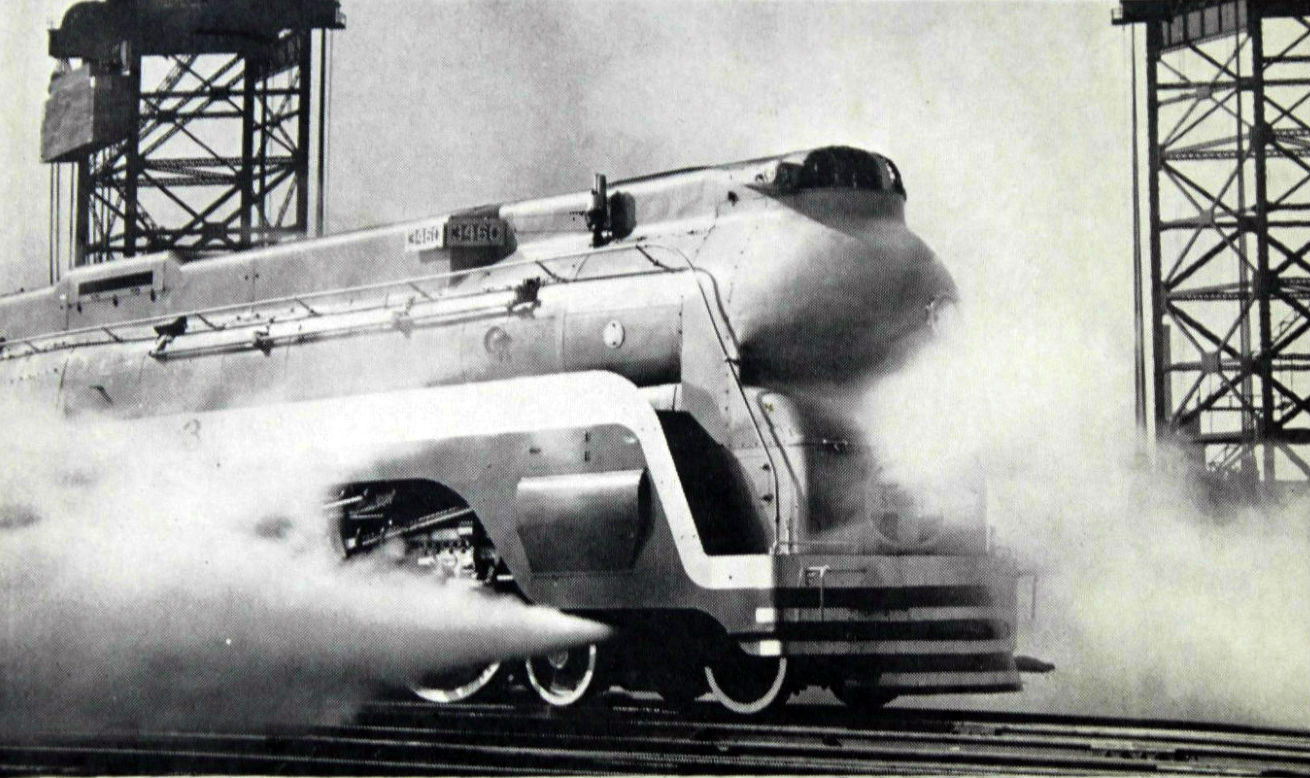
Locomotive #3460, the Blue Goose, which was the streamlined steam locomotive for the Chief

A typical heavyweight Chief consist in Winter, 1937:

- 4-6-4 "Hudson"-type Steam Locomotive #3451
- Express Mail #2041
- Railway Post Office #63
- Baggage-Club-Lounge #1304 Chief Manakaja
- Lounge General Carr (10 sections, likely utilized as crew Dormitory space)
- Fred Harvey Company Diner #1472
- Sleeper Glen Ewen (6 compartments, 3 drawing rooms)
- Sleeper Laurel Wood (8 sections, 2 compartments, 1 drawing room)
- Sleeper-Observation-Lounge Crystal Bay (3 compartments, 2 drawing rooms)

A typical "mixed" Chief consist as of January 31, 1938 (the Chief regularly included heavyweight head-end cars in its consist, even into the late 1940s):

- 4-6-4 "Hudson"-type Steam Locomotive #3460 (also known as the "Blue Goose")
- Railway Post Office #79 (heavyweight)
- Baggage #1894 (heavyweight)
- Baggage-Buffet-Lounge #1380 San Miguel (also included a barber shop)
- Sleeper Otowi (17 roomettes)
- Sleeper Ganado (14 sections)
- Sleeper Toreva (8 sections, 2 compartments, 2 double bedrooms)
- Sleeper Mankoweap (4 compartments, 2 drawing rooms, 4 Dbl. Bdrm.)
- Dormitory-Club-Lounge #1373 Tesuque
- Fred Harvey Company Diner #1477
- Sleeper Mohave (4 compartments, 2 drawing rooms, 4 double bedrooms)
- Sleeper Sinyala (8 sections, 2 compartments, 2 double bedrooms)
- Sleeper-Observation-Lounge Betahtakin (4 drawing rooms, 1 double bedroom)

Transcontinental Sleeping Car Service was inaugurated in Spring 1946, and the Chief began regularly carrying three such cars in its consist: two originating in New York City, and the other in Washington, D.C. (most often these were smooth-sided cars painted two-tone Pullman grey). By the following summer, the Chief had retired all of its steam-driven motive power and was usually pulled behind A-B-B-A sets of EMD FT locomotives or A-B-A sets of the new ALCO PAs).

The following is a typical all-lightweight Chief consist as of late 1947:

- ALCO PA Locomotive #53L
- ALCO PB Locomotive #53A
- ALCO PA Locomotive #53B
- Baggage #3452
- Railway Post Office #88
- Baggage #3438
- Baggage-Buffet-Lounge #1381 San Marcial (also included a barber shop)
- Sleeper Maito (17 roomettes)
- Sleeper Verde Valley (6 sections, 6 roomettes, 4 double bedrooms)
- Sleeper Imperial Park (4 compartments, 2 drawing rooms, 4 double bedrooms)
- Sleeper Tapacipa (4 compartments, 2 drawing rooms, 4 double bedrooms)
- Dormitory-Club-Lounge #1372 Picuris
- Fred Harvey Company Diner #1497
- Sleeper Kayenta (4 compartments, 2 drawing rooms, 4 double bedrooms)
- Sleeper Sinyala (8 sections, 2 compartments, 2 double bedrooms)
- Sleeper Tolani (8 sections, 2 compartments, 2 double bedrooms)
- Sleeper-Observation-Lounge Biltabito (4 drawing rooms, 1 double bedroom)

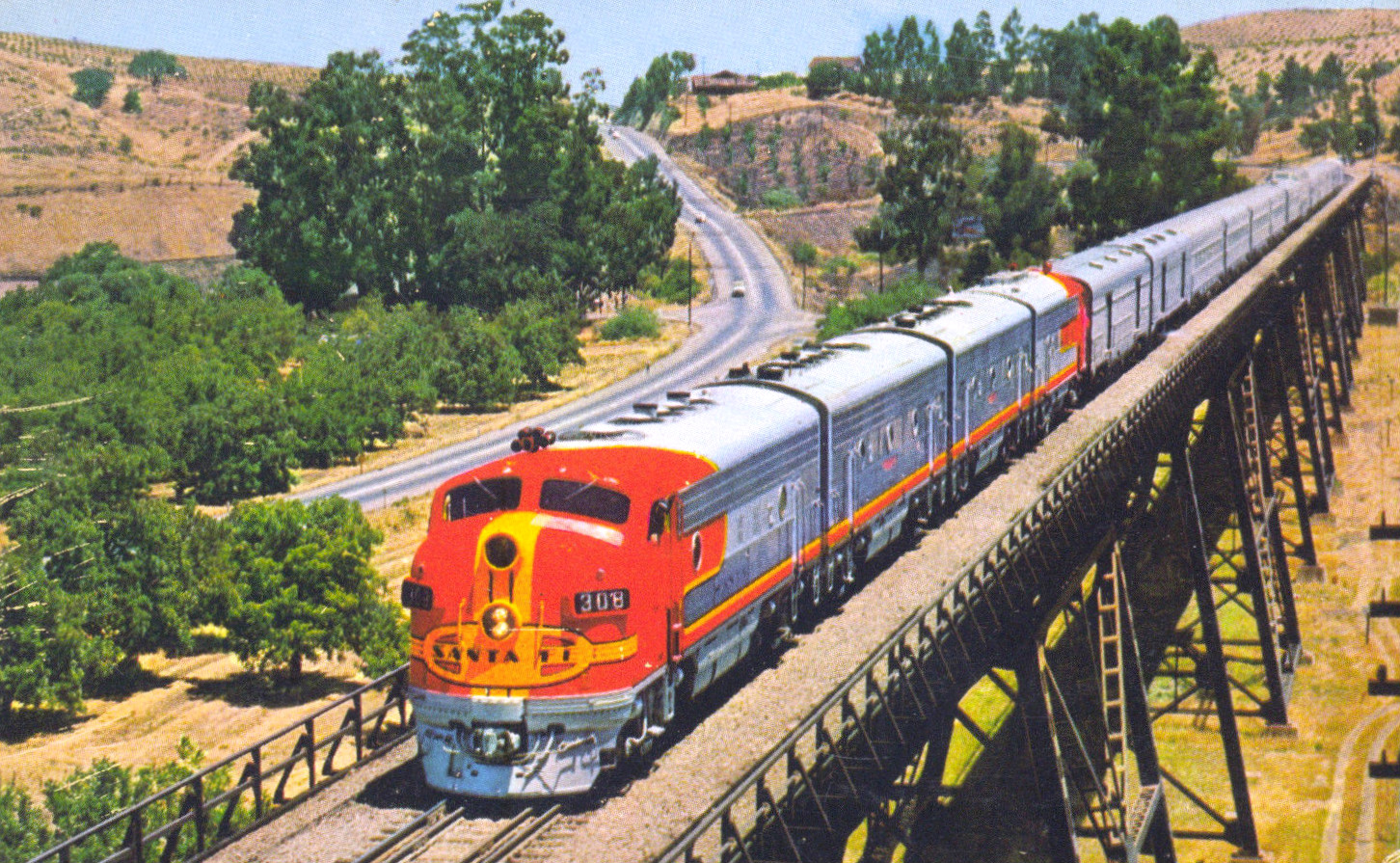
EMD F7-led San Francisco Chief crossing the Muir Trestle near Martinez, California in the 1950s

A typical Chief consist in the mid-1950s (note the absence of an observation car, which was eliminated as per Santa Fe policy):

- EMD F7A Locomotive #46C
- EMD F7B Locomotive #46B
- EMD F3B Locomotive #19B
- EMD F7B Locomotive #301A
- EMD F7A Locomotive #301L
- Baggage #3657
- Baggage #3442
- Baggage-Dormitory #1381
- "Chair" car / Coach (44 "leg-rest" seats) #2938
- "Chair" car / Coach (44 "leg-rest" seats) #2883
- "Chair" car / Coach (44 "leg-rest" seats) #2909
- Lunch Counter-Diner #1568
- "Chair" car / Coach (44 "leg-rest" seats) #2848
- "Chair" car / Coach (44 "leg-rest" seats) #2831
- "Big Dome"-Lounge #509
- Fred Harvey Company Diner #1491
- Sleeper Blue Island (10 roomettes, 2 compartments, 3 double bedrooms)*
- Sleeper Pine Dale (10 roomettes, 6 double bedrooms)
- Sleeper Palm Star (10 roomettes, 6 double bedrooms)
- Sleeper Citrus Valley (6 sections, 6 roomettes, 4 double bedrooms) (ran from Chicago, Illinois — Denver, Colorado; switched out at La Junta, Colorado).
- Sleeper Estancia Valley (6 sections, 6 roomettes, 4 double bedrooms) (ran from Denver, Colorado — Los Angeles, California; switched in at La Junta, Colorado).

*NOTE: The nineteen "10-2-3" sleepers in the Blue series had a floorplan configuration unique to the Santa Fe.

== See also ==
- Passenger train service on the Atchison, Topeka and Santa Fe Railway
