= Drumhead (sign) =

Sign on a train showing its name

The term drumhead refers to a type of removable sign that was prevalent on North American railroads of the first half of the 20th century. The sign was mounted at the rear of named passenger trains, and consisted of a box with internal illumination that shone through a tinted panel bearing the logo of the railroad or specific train. Since the box and the sign were usually circular in shape and resembled small drums, they came to be known as drumheads.

Railroad drumheads were removable so that they could be mounted on different passenger cars (usually on the rear of observations), as needed for specific trains.

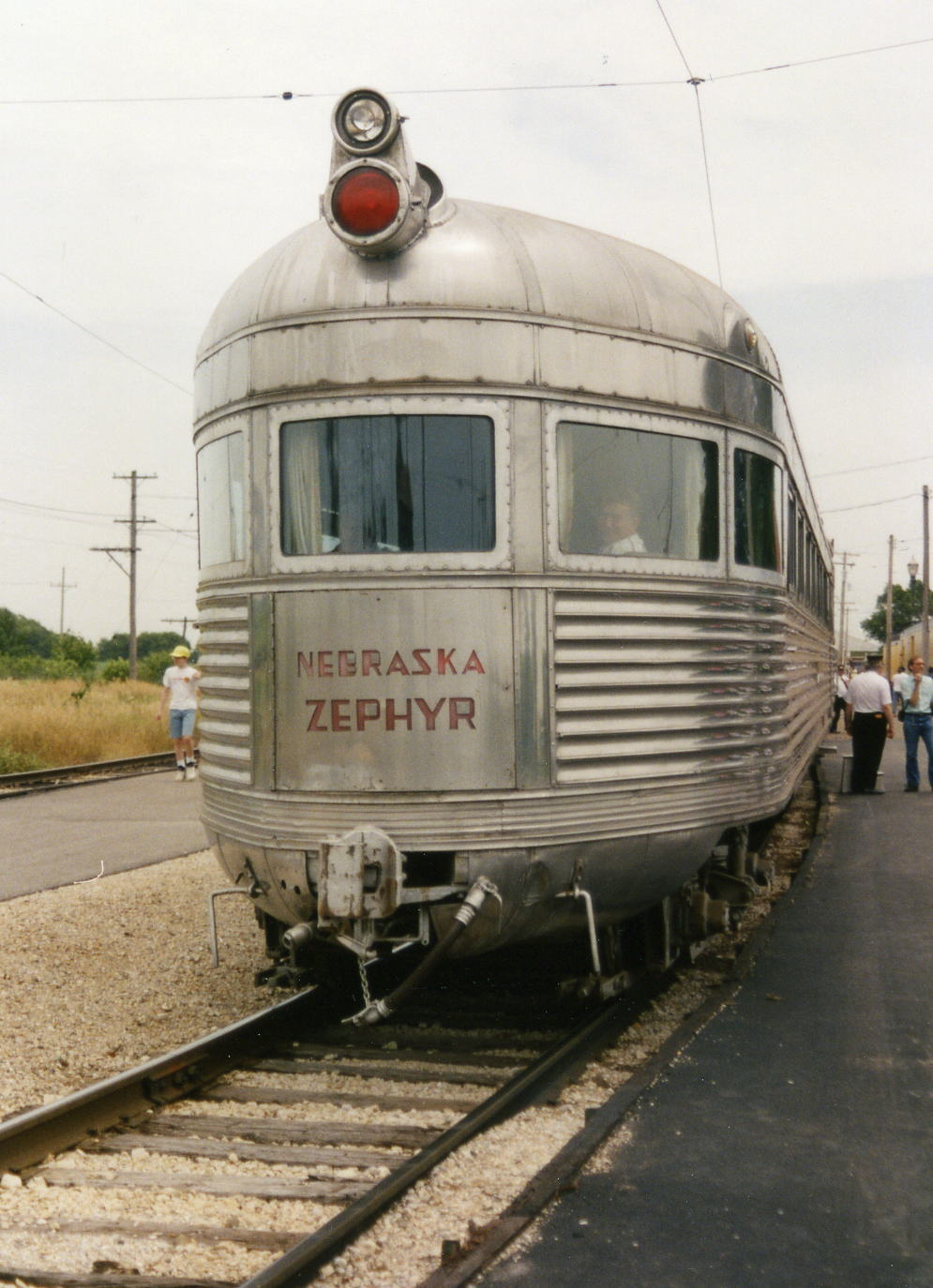
The observation car on the Nebraska Zephyr at the Illinois Railway Museum in Union, Illinois, showing a rectangular drumhead.

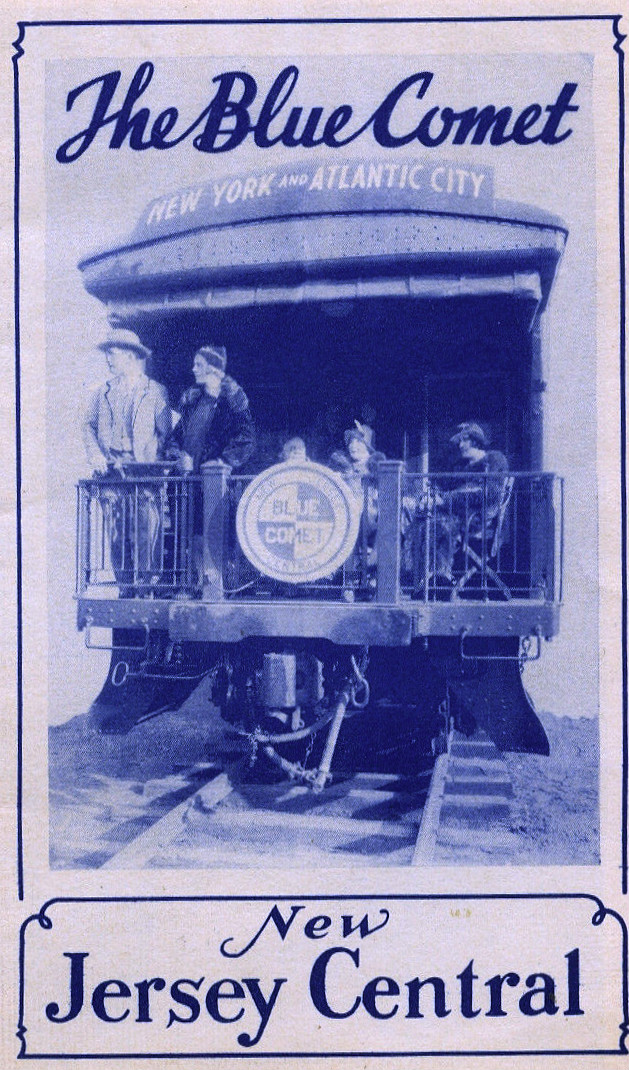
The Blue Comet observation car showing a circular drumhead.

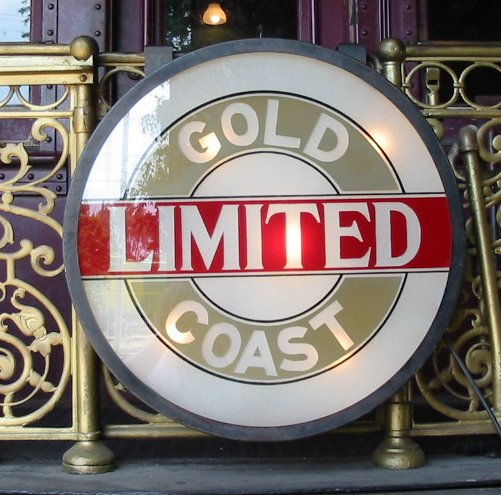
A closeup of a drumhead used on the Gold Coast Limited of the Chicago North Shore and Milwaukee Railroad.

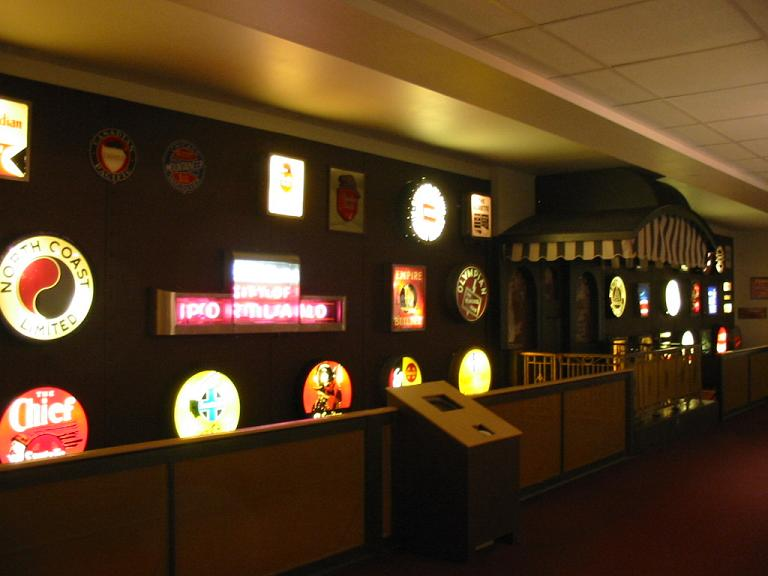
A display of several railroad drumheads at the National Railroad Museum in Green Bay, Wisconsin.

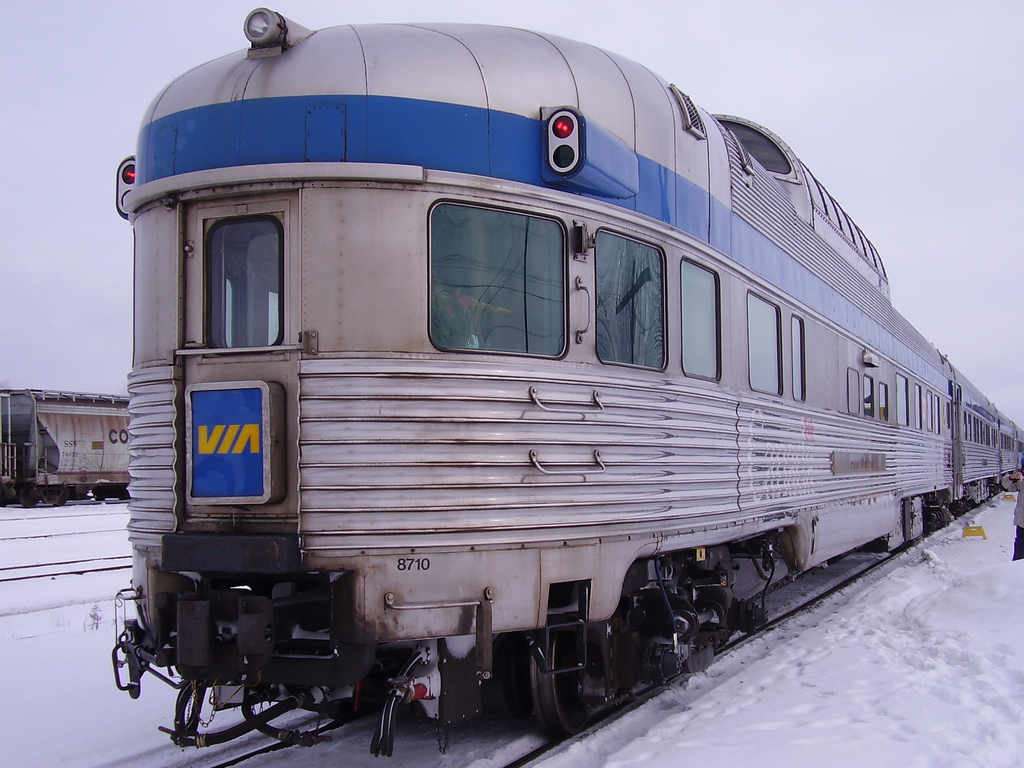
Via Rail's Prince Albert Park car on The Canadian, showing off its drumhead

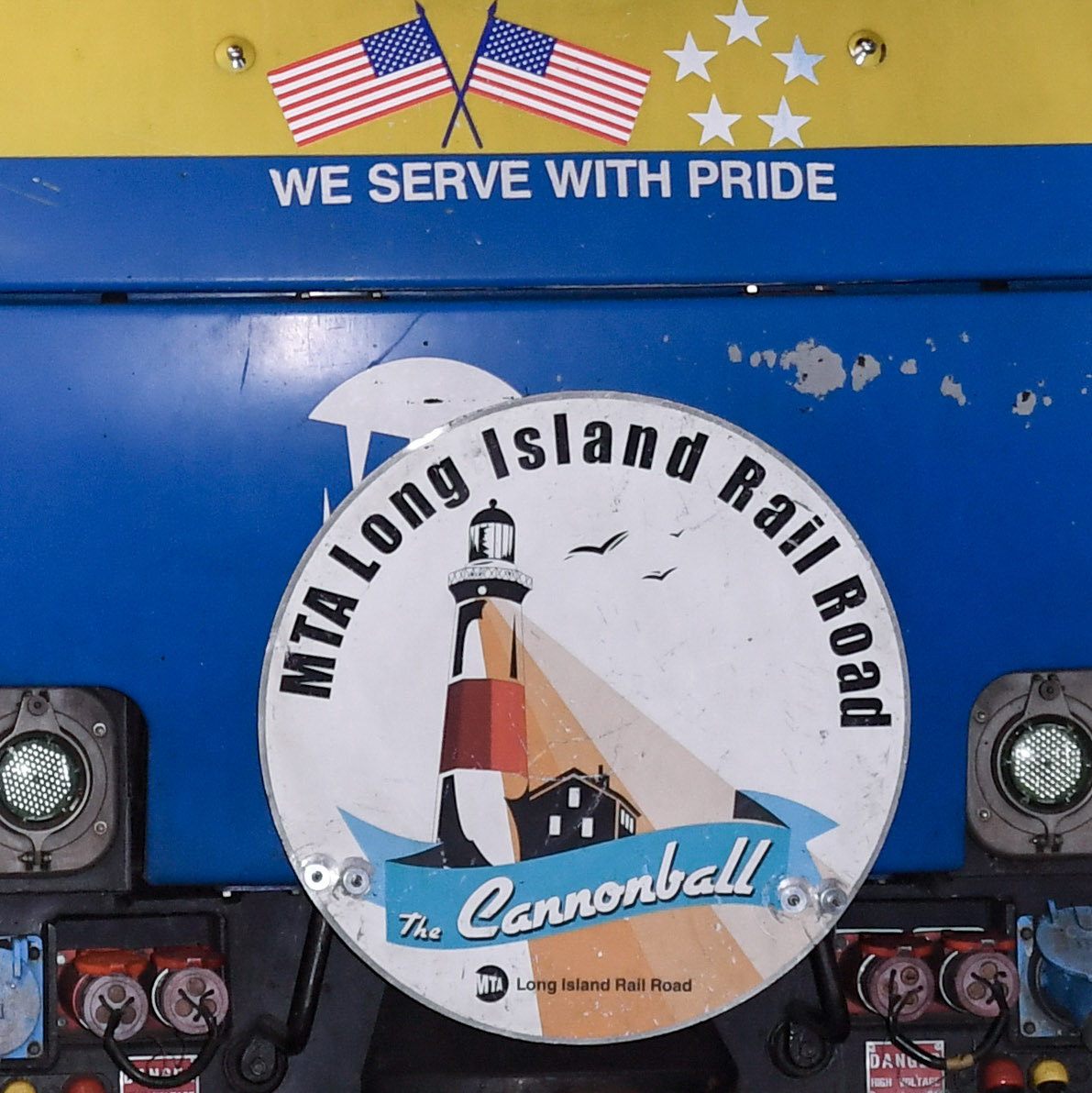
A closeup of a drumhead used on the Long Island Rail Road's Cannonball train.

== See also ==
- Headboard
