= List of North American dome cars =

A dome car is a type of railway passenger car that has a glass dome on the top of the car where passengers can ride and see in all directions around the train. It also can include features of a coach, lounge car, dining car, sleeping car or observation. Beginning in 1945, a total of 236 were delivered for North American railroad companies. Three companies manufactured dome cars for North America: American Car and Foundry, Budd, and Pullman-Standard. In addition, the Southern Pacific Railroad constructed seven dome-lounges in its own shops.

== List ==
=== Budd ===
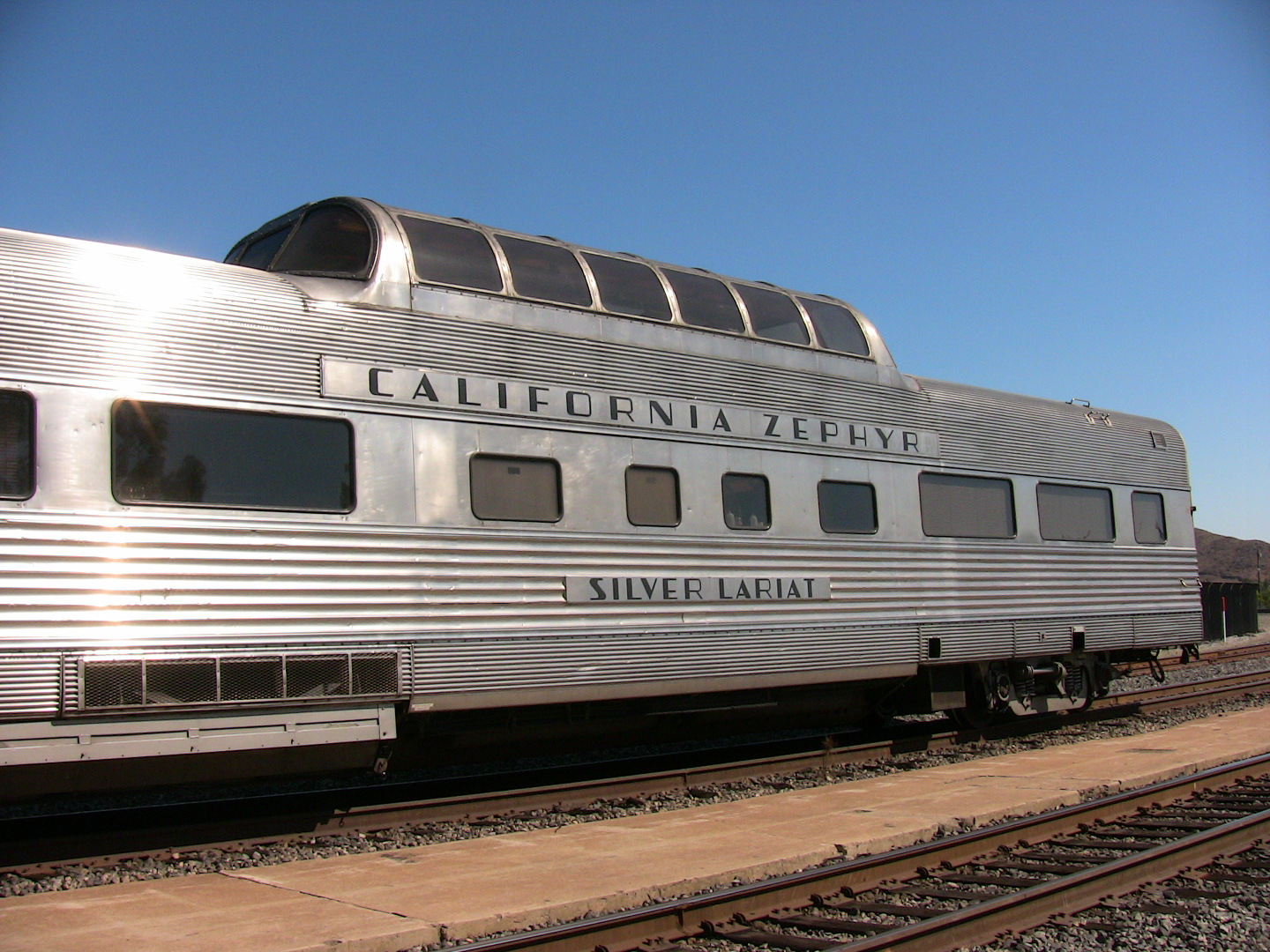
Ex-CB&Q dome coach No. 4718 Silver Lariat in excursion service

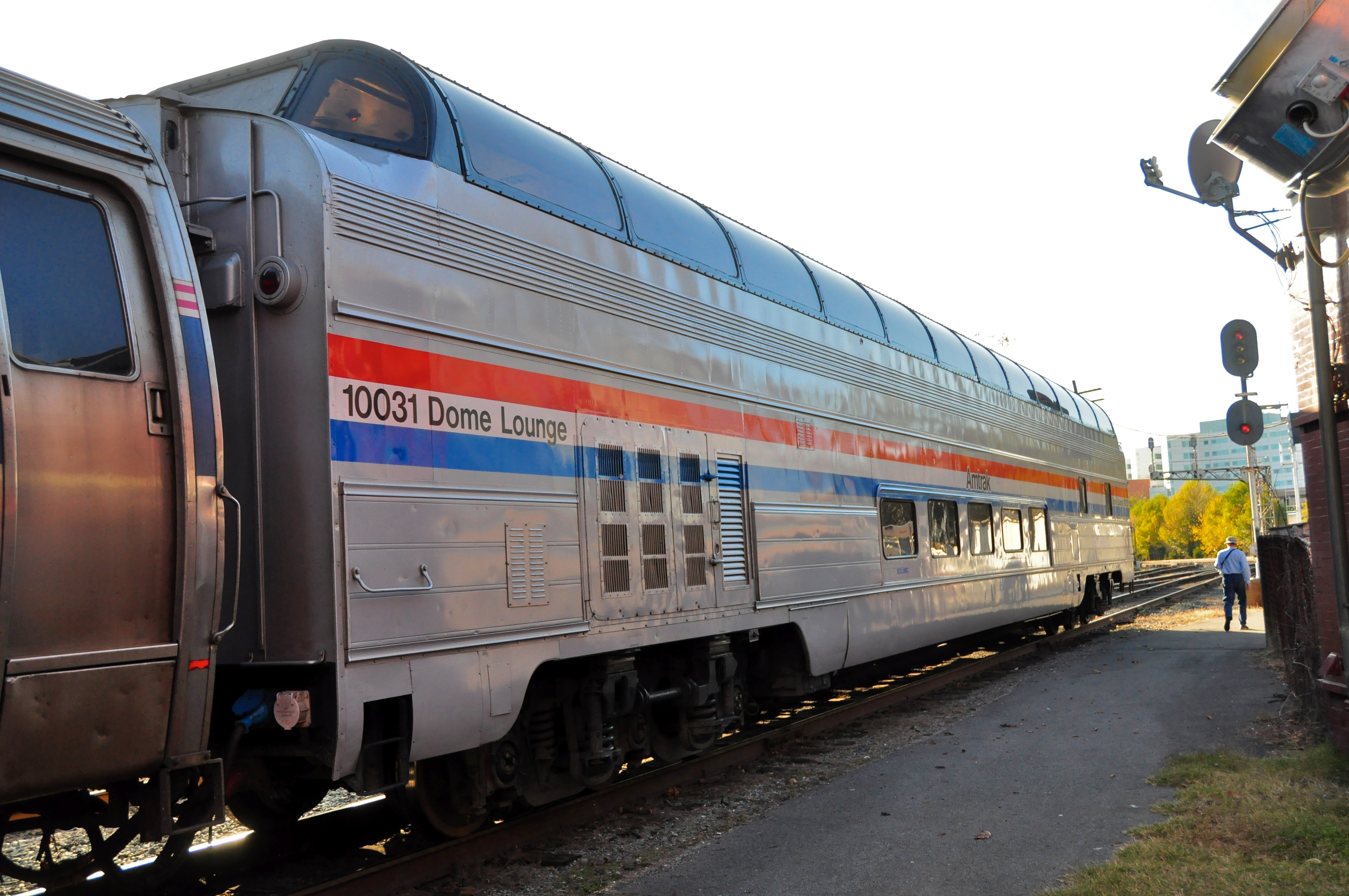
Ex-GN Great Dome No. 1391 in Amtrak service in 2011

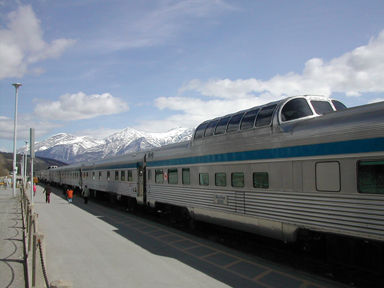
Ex-CP Skyline series in Via Rail service

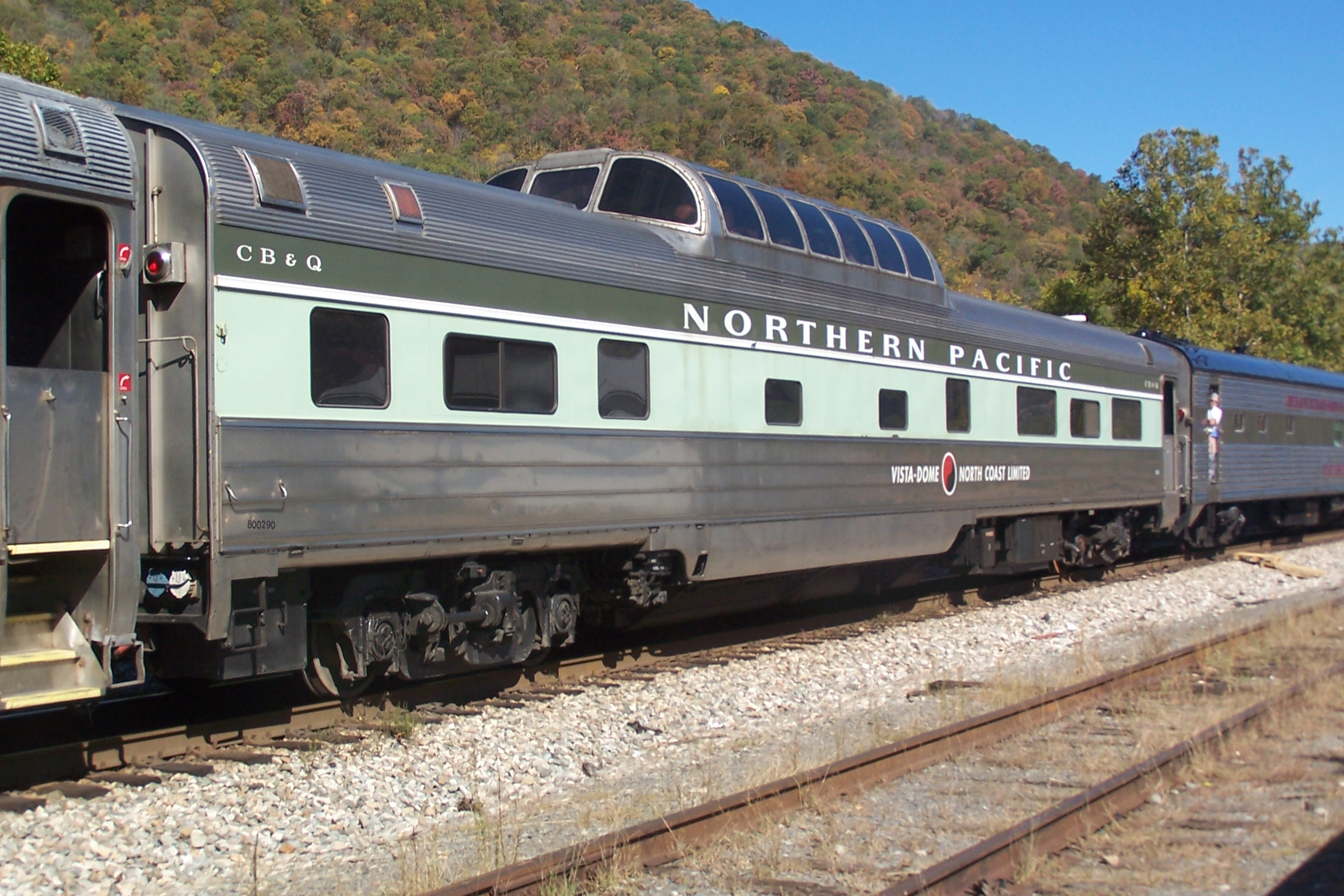
Ex-CB&Q dome coach No. 558 in 2007

Owner	Quantity	Road numbers	Type	Year	Article
Atchison, Topeka and Santa Fe	8	506–513	Lounge	1954	Big Dome
Atchison, Topeka and Santa Fe	6	550–555	Lounge-dormitory	1954	Big Dome
Canadian Pacific	18	500–517	Buffet-lounge	1954	Skyline series
Canadian Pacific	18	15401–15418	Sleeper-observation	1954	Park series
Chesapeake and Ohio	3	1850–1852	Sleeper	1948	Strata-Dome
Chesapeake and Ohio	3	1875–1877	Coach-observation	1948	Chessie
Chicago, Burlington and Quincy	2	235–236	Parlor-lounge-observation	1956	Denver Zephyr
Chicago, Burlington and Quincy	3	250–252	Lounge-dormitory	1948	California Zephyr
Chicago, Burlington and Quincy	2	253–254	Lounge-dormitory	1956	Denver Zephyr
Chicago, Burlington and Quincy	2	304–305	Sleeper	1954	North Coast Limited
Chicago, Burlington and Quincy	2	320–321	Coach-lounge-dormitory	1953	Kansas City Zephyr
Chicago, Burlington and Quincy	2	360–361	Parlor-observation	1947	Twin Cities Zephyr
Chicago, Burlington and Quincy	2	365–366	Parlor-observation	1953	Kansas City Zephyr
Chicago, Burlington and Quincy	4	375–378	Sleeper-lounge-observation	1948	California Zephyr
Chicago, Burlington and Quincy	2	557–558	Coach	1954	North Coast Limited
Chicago, Burlington and Quincy	3	1333–1335	Coach	1955	Empire Builder
Chicago, Burlington and Quincy	1	1395	Lounge	1955	Great Dome
Chicago, Burlington and Quincy	1	4709	Coach	1940	
Chicago, Burlington and Quincy	1	4714	Coach	1940	
Chicago, Burlington and Quincy	7	4716–4722	Coach	1948	California Zephyr
Chicago, Burlington and Quincy	8	4723–4730	Coach	1947	Twin Cities Zephyr
Chicago, Burlington and Quincy	2	4735–4736	Coach	1956	Denver Zephyr
Denver and Rio Grande Western	4	1105–1108	Coach	1948	California Zephyr
Denver and Rio Grande Western	1	1140	Lounge-dormitory	1948	California Zephyr
Denver and Rio Grande Western	1	1145	Sleeper-lounge-observation	1948	California Zephyr
Great Northern	12	1320–1331	Coach	1955	Empire Builder
Great Northern	5	1390–1394	Lounge	1955	Great Dome
Missouri Pacific	3	890–892	Coach	1948	Texas Eagle (MP train)
Northern Pacific	8	307–313	Sleeper	1954	North Coast Limited
Northern Pacific	1	314	Sleeper	1957	North Coast Limited
Northern Pacific	1	549	Coach	1957	North Coast Limited
Northern Pacific	7	550–556	Coach	1954	North Coast Limited
Spokane, Portland and Seattle	1	306	Sleeper	1954	North Coast Limited
Spokane, Portland and Seattle	1	559	Coach	1954	North Coast Limited
Spokane, Portland and Seattle	1	1332	Coach	1955	Empire Builder
Wabash	3	200–202	Coach	1950	Blue Bird
Wabash	1	1601	Parlor-observation	1950	Blue Bird
Western Pacific	7	811–817	Coach	1948	California Zephyr
Western Pacific	2	831–832	Lounge-dormitory	1948	California Zephyr
Western Pacific	2	881–882	Sleeper-lounge-observation	1948	California Zephyr

=== Pullman-Standard ===
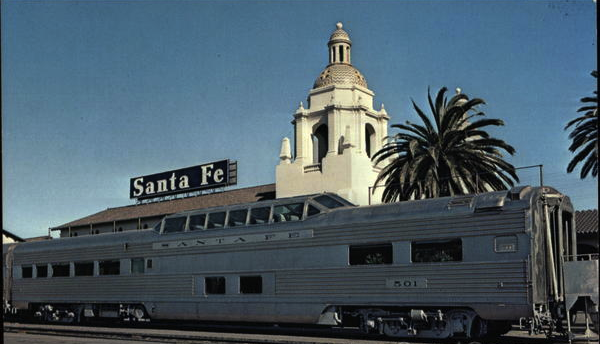
ATSF Pleasure Dome No. 501 at Union Station in San Diego, California prior to entering regular service on the Super Chief

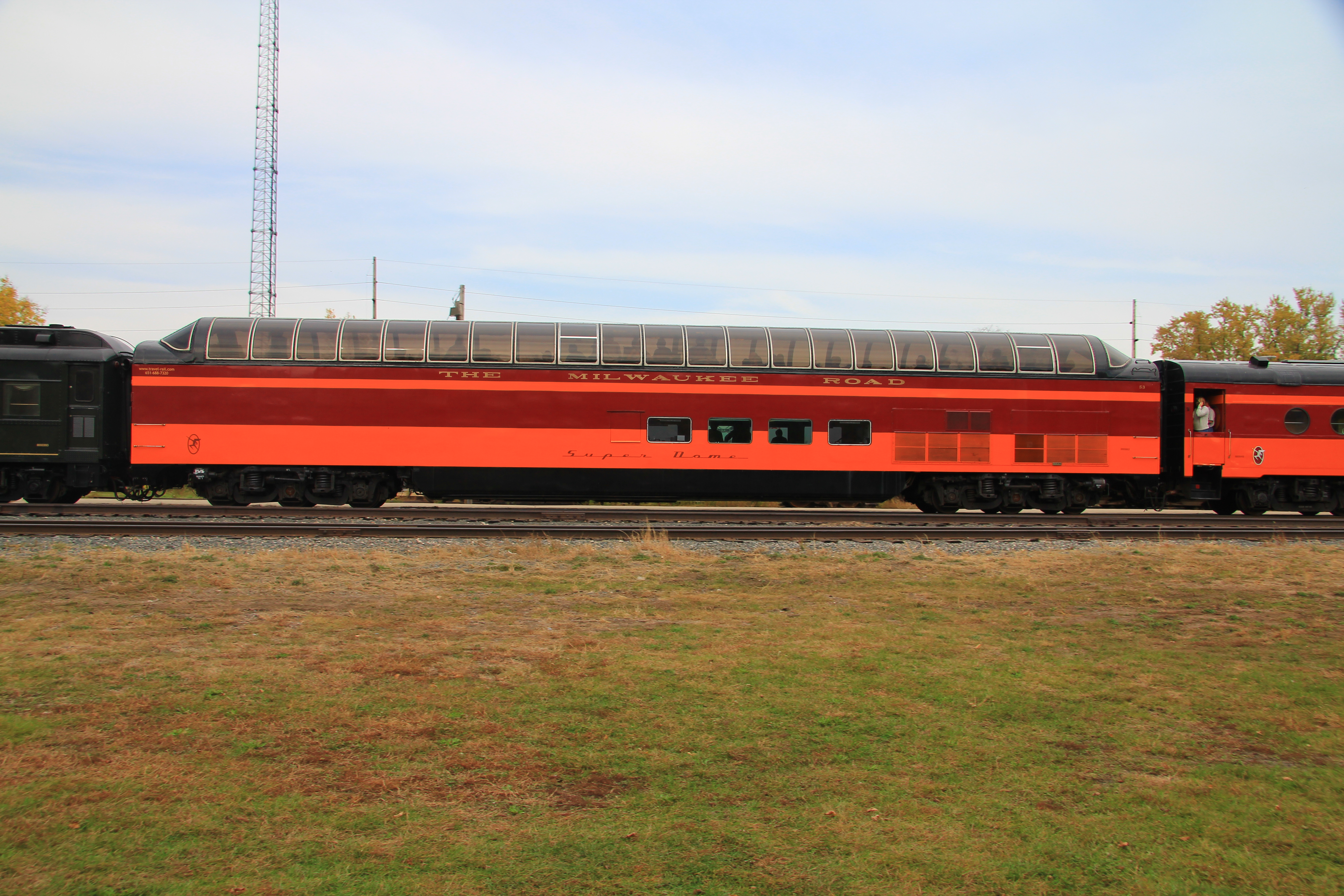
Ex-Milwaukee Road Super Dome No. 53 at Winona, Minnesota in 2010

Owner	Quantity	Road numbers	Type	Year	Article
Atchison, Topeka and Santa Fe Railway	6	500–505	Lounge	1950	Pleasure Dome
Baltimore and Ohio Railroad	2	5550–5551	Lounge	1949	Strata-Dome
Chicago, Milwaukee, St. Paul and Pacific Railroad	10	50–59	Lounge	1952	Super Dome
General Motors	1		Coach	1947	Train of Tomorrow
General Motors	1		Diner	1947	Train of Tomorrow
General Motors	1		Lounge	1947	Train of Tomorrow
General Motors	1		Sleeper	1947	Train of Tomorrow
International–Great Northern Railroad	1	896	Coach	1952	Texas Eagle
Missouri Pacific Railroad	3	893–895	Coach	1952	Texas Eagle
Texas and Pacific Railway	1	200	Coach	1952	Texas Eagle
Wabash Railroad	1	203	Coach	1958	City of St. Louis
Wabash Railroad	1	1602	Parlor-lounge	1952	Blue Bird

=== American Car and Foundry ===
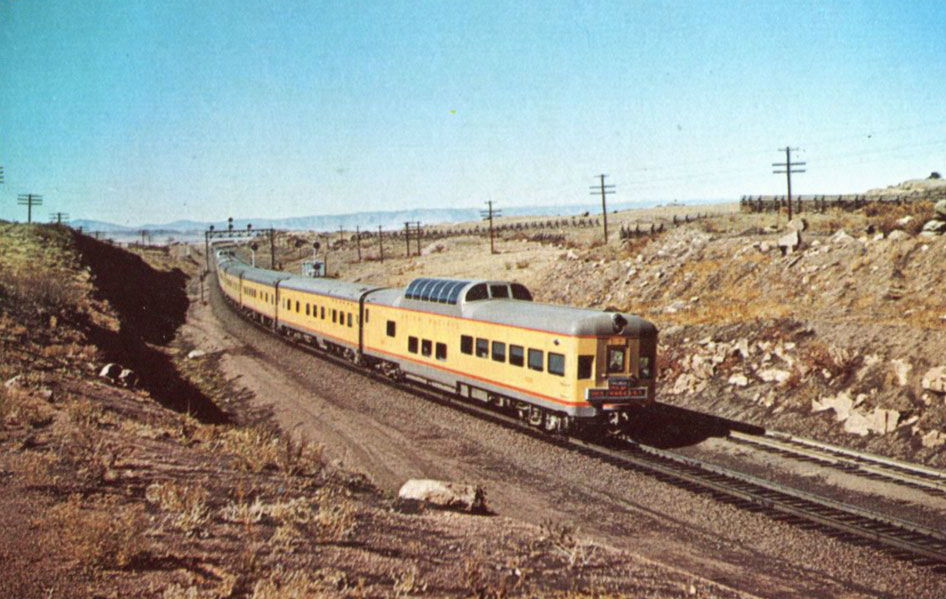
An Astra Dome lounge-observation car brings up the rear of the City of Los Angeles in the 1950s

Owner	Quantity	Road numbers	Type	Year	Article
Union Pacific Railroad	10	7000–7009	Coach	1954–1955	Astra Dome
Union Pacific Railroad	10	8000–8009	Diner	1955	Astra Dome
Union Pacific Railroad	15	9000–9014	Lounge-observation	1955	Astra Dome

=== Southern Pacific ===
Owner	Quantity	Road numbers	Type	Year	Article
Southern Pacific Railroad	7	3600–3606	Lounge	1954–1955	3/4 Domes SP Shops

== See also ==
- Dome lounge
