= Great Dome =

Great Dome may refer to:

- Great Dome (MIT), a building on the Massachusetts Institute of Technology campus
- Great Dome (railcar), a type of lounge car built by the Budd Company
