= Astra Dome =

Fleet of streamlined dome cars

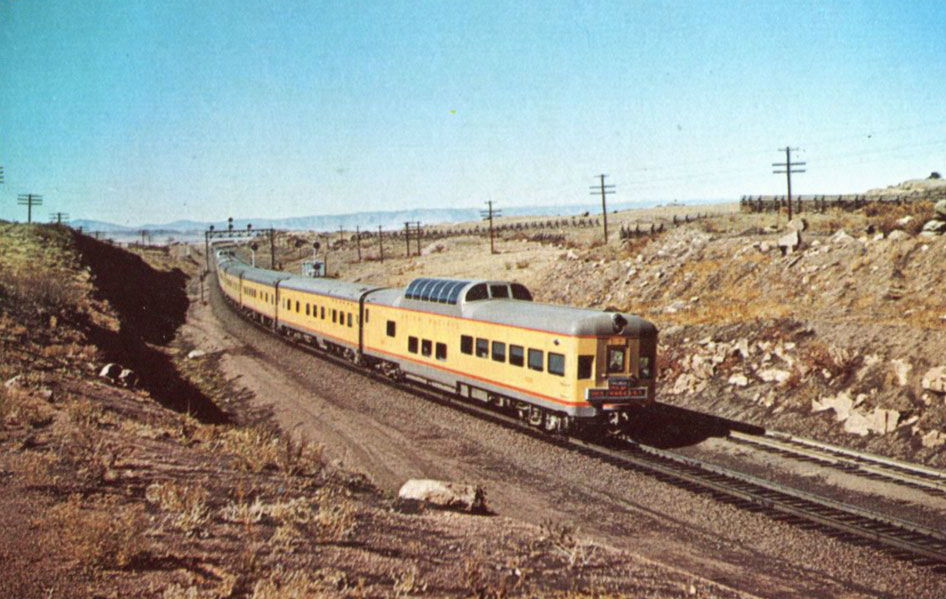
- An Astra Dome lounge-observation car brings up the rear of the City of Los Angeles in the 1950s.

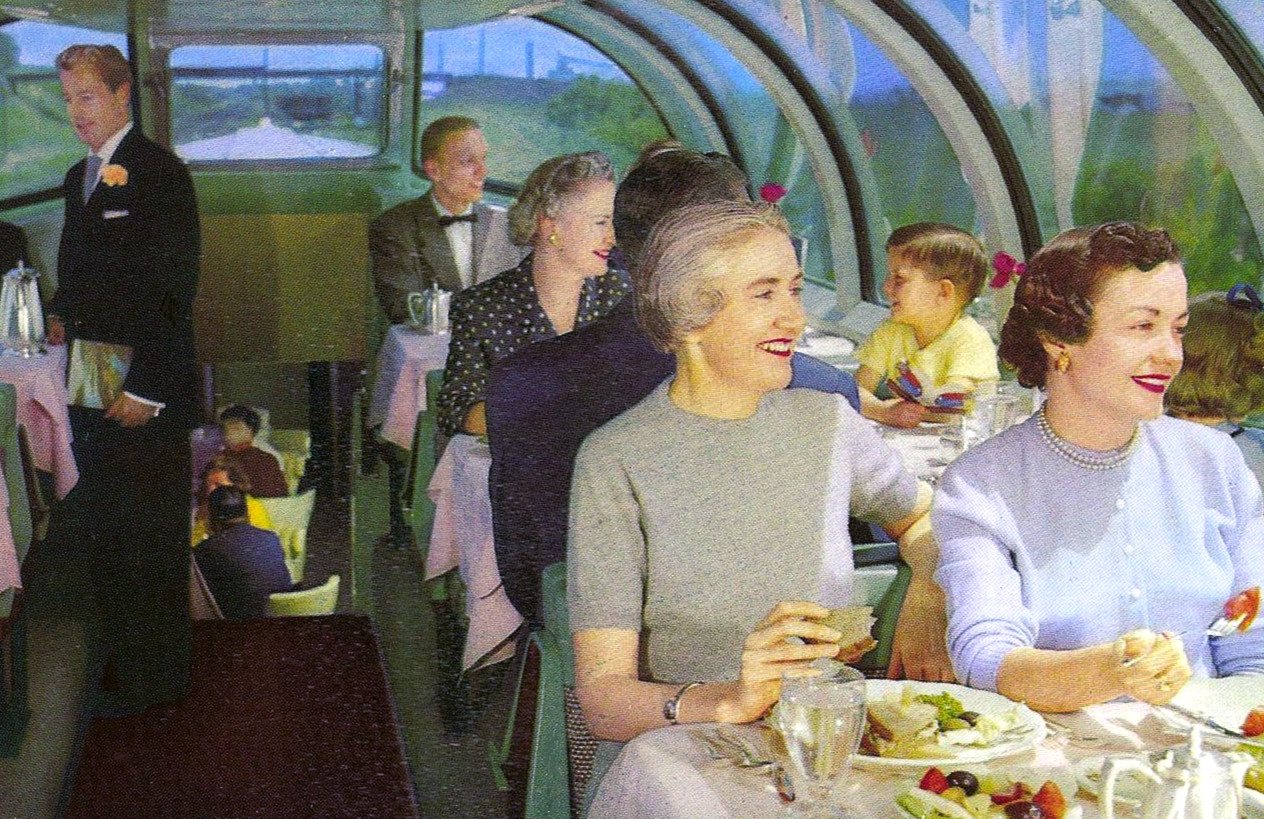
- The upper-level dining area in an Astra Dome dining car.
- In service: Union Pacific: 1955–1971; Auto-Train: 1971–1981
- Manufacturers: American Car and Foundry; Pullman-Standard
- Constructed: 1954–1955; 1958
- Number built: 41
- Number in service: 8 (as part of the Union Pacific heritage fleet)
- Fleet numbers: Union Pacific: 7000-7009 (coaches); 7011-7015 (coaches); 8000-8009 (dining cars); 9000-9014 (lounge-observation); Wabash: 203
- Operators: Union Pacific Railroad (1955-1971); Wabash Railroad (1958-1964); Auto-Train Corporation (1971-1981)

Specifications
- Car length: 85 feet (26 m)
- Width: 10 feet (3.0 m)

The Astra Domes were a fleet of streamlined dome cars built by the American Car and Foundry Company ("ACF") and later by Pullman-Standard ("PS") for the Union Pacific Railroad between 1954–1958. ACF built a total of 35 cars including coaches, dining cars, and observation cars, while PS built 5 for Union Pacific. After Union Pacific exited the passenger business in 1971 the Auto-Train Corporation purchased most of the fleet and operated them for an additional ten years.

== Design ==
ACF produced three types of domes for the Union Pacific. The configuration that these dome cars come in are coaches, dining cars, and observation cars. The ten dining cars were unique for that the only dome dining cars (aside from GM's Train of Tomorrow) ever built for a United States railroad. The cars featured seating on both levels: 18 in the upper level in booths and 18 in the lower level at tables. Also located on the lower level was a kitchen, pantry, and private dining room with seating for 10. A dumbwaiter (elevator) connected the two levels.

The coaches could seat 24 in the dome area and an additional 36 in the lower level. The center section was given over to men's and women's lounges. The lounge-observation cars were square-ended instead of the rounded-off design favored by many railroads. Like the coaches, the upper-level dome area could seat 24. In the lower level, starting at the vestibule end, was a card room (seating for five), cocktail lounge (seats for nine) and bar, stairs up to the dome level, and finally the observation area itself with seating for 19.

== Service history ==
The Union Pacific was a comparative latecomer to the dome scene when it ordered the Astra Domes from ACF in 1954; most western railroads already operated domes, some since the late 1940s. ACF delivered the 35 cars to the Union Pacific in 1955 at the cost of US$10,000,000. The Union Pacific assigned the cars to its various transcontinental streamliners:

- Five coaches to the new Challenger
- Five coaches, five dining cars and five lounge-observation cars to the City of Portland
- Five dining cars and five lounge-observation cars to City of Los Angeles
- Five lounge-observation cars to the City of St. Louis

The Union Pacific found it necessary to assign a second steward to the upper-level dining area. The Union Pacific gave great publicity to the novelty of dome dining cars operating between Chicago, Portland, Oregon and Los Angeles.

Union Pacific later ordered an extra five coaches from Pullman-Standard, numbered 7011-7015 in 1958 which were assigned to the City of St. Louis. Alongside these was another dome, purchased for the Wabash Railroad. This car was later leased and then purchased by the Norfolk and Western.

After the Union Pacific exited the passenger business in 1971 it sold two of the dome coaches (#7004 and #7008) to the Alaska Railroad for use on its AuRoRa streamliner. UP retained dome coach #7006 and dome lounge-observation #9004 for company use and donated dome diner #8003 to the National Railroad Museum in Green Bay, Wisconsin, where it remains today. The remainder of the fleet–seven coaches, nine dining cars and fourteen lounge-observation cars–were purchased by the new Auto-Train Corporation for use on the Auto-Train. After Auto-Train's bankruptcy in 1981 the fleet was sold and dispersed. Many remain in private hands, while some were reacquired by UP for use in excursions, business trains, and inspection trains as part of the Union Pacific Heritage Fleet.

The current Astra Dome cars in the Union Pacific Heritage fleet include:

- Dome Coach #7001 "Columbine"
- Dome Coach #7015 "Challenger"
- Dome Diner #7011 "Missouri River Eagle"
- Dome Diner #8004 "Colorado Eagle"
- Dome Diner #8008 "City of Portland"
- Dome Lounge #9004 "Harriman"
- Dome Lounge #9005 "Walter Dean"
- Dome Lounge #9009 "City of San Francisco" (still retains its observation car configuration)
