= Dome car =

American panoramic rail coach with en external dome

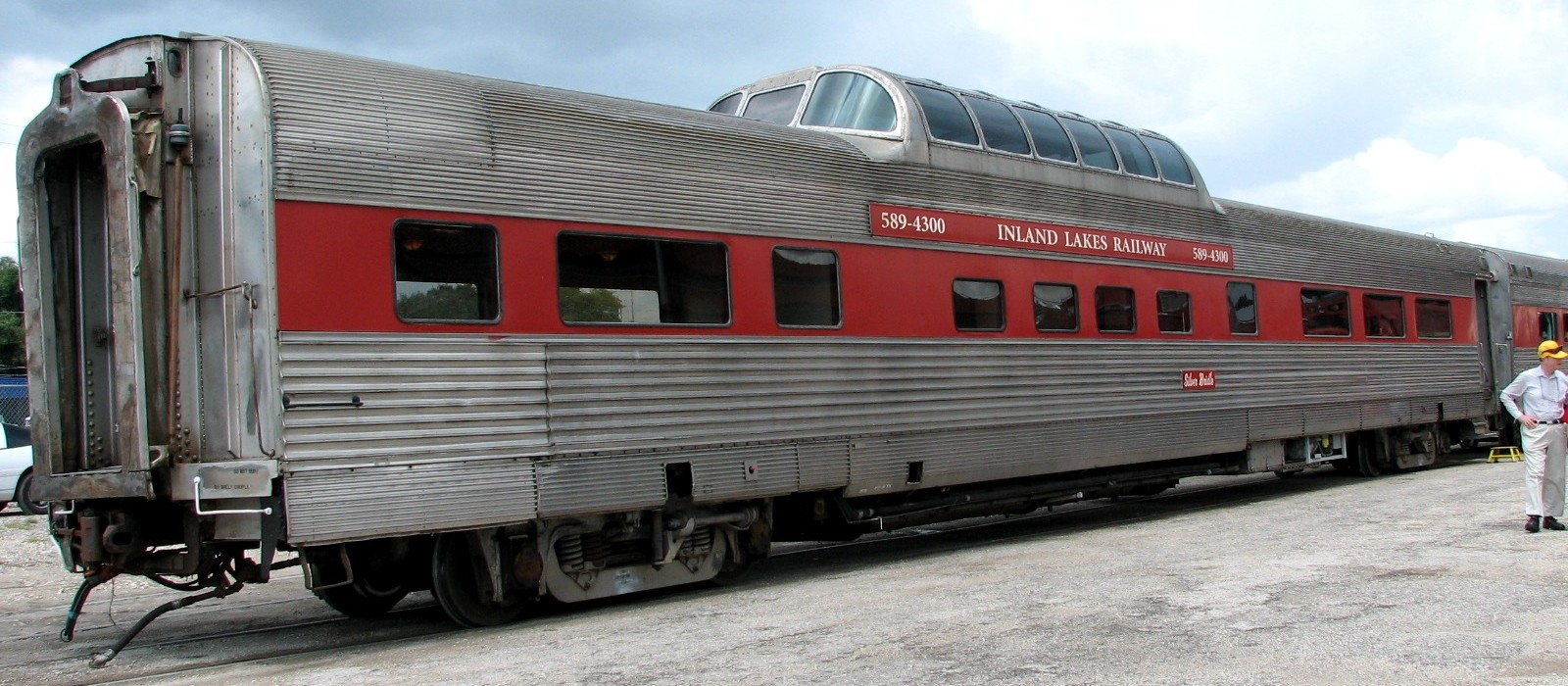
Former California Zephyr Silver Bridle dome car in excursion train service with the defunct Inland Lakes Railway in Plymouth, Florida

A dome car is a type of railway passenger car that has a glass dome on the top of the car where passengers can ride and see in all directions around the train. It also can include features of a coach, lounge car, dining car, sleeping car or observation. Beginning in 1945, dome cars were primarily used in the United States and Canada, though a small number were constructed in Europe for Trans Europ Express service.

In North America, dome cars were manufactured by the Budd Company, Pullman Standard and American Car & Foundry. Southern Pacific Railroad built its own dome cars in its Sacramento, California, shops. In the 1990s Colorado Railcar began producing dome cars. Generally, seats in the dome were considered "non-revenue" like lounge car seats.

== Configuration ==
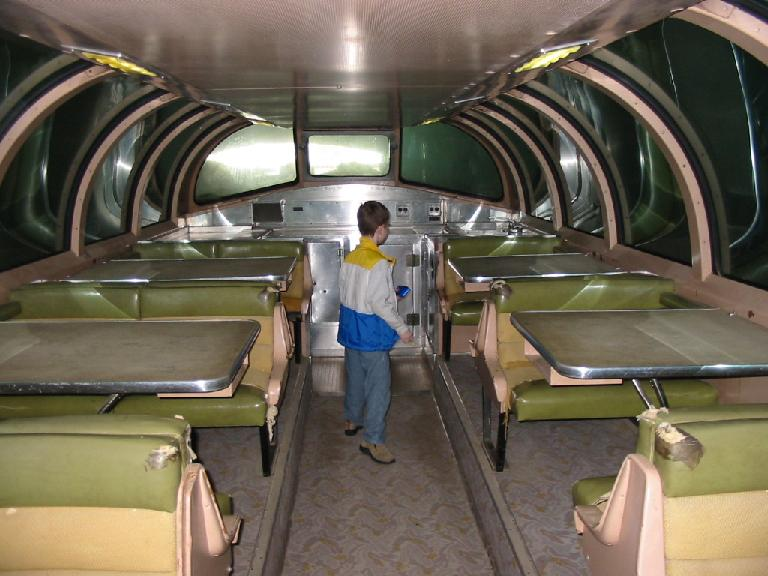
The upper-level interior of a dome car, configured as a dining area, on display at the National Railroad Museum in Green Bay, Wisconsin

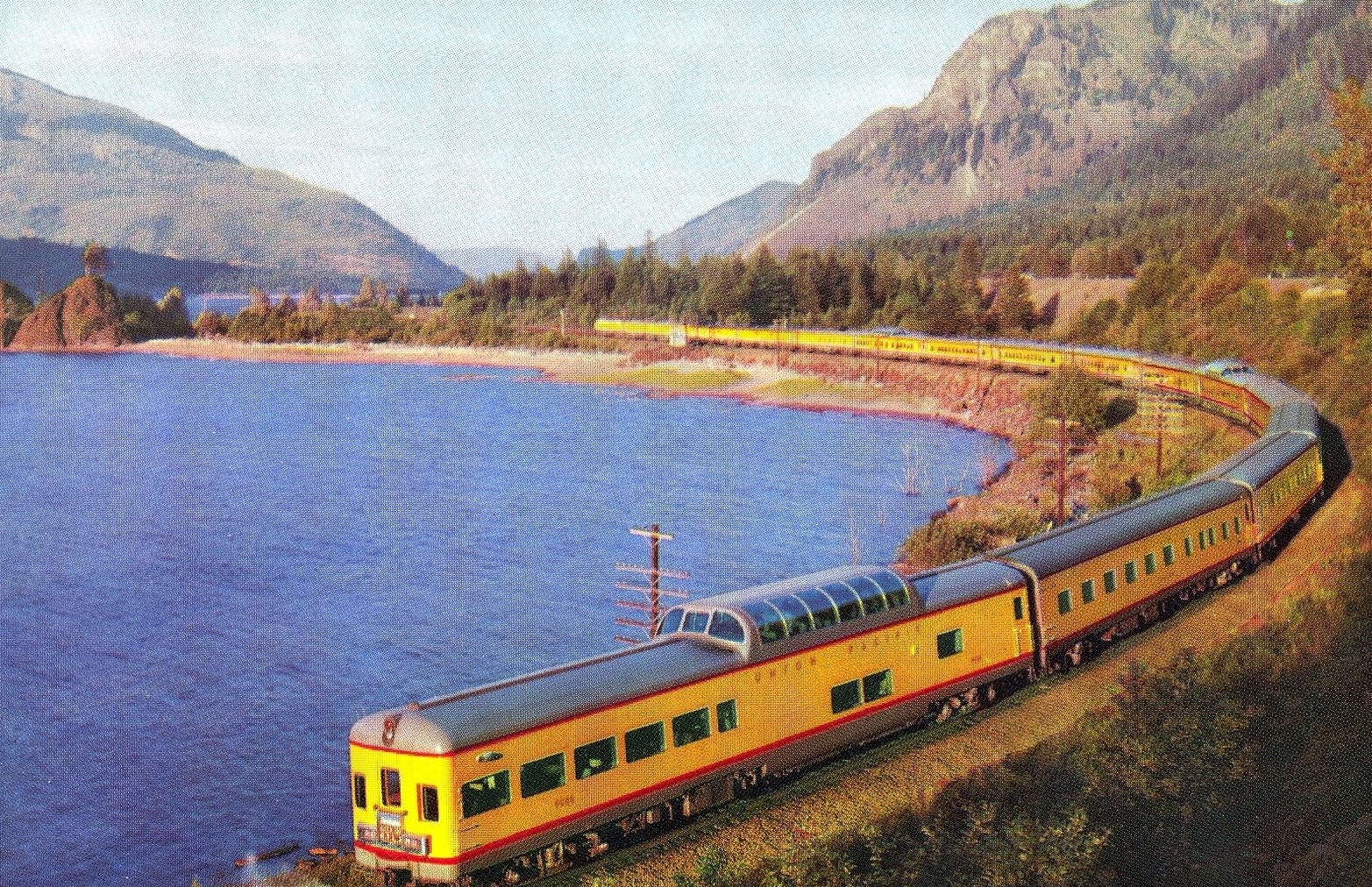
Dome observation car at the rear of Union Pacific's City of Portland passenger train

A portion of the car, usually in the center of the car but offset towards one end, is split between two levels. The offset results in floorplans having a "long end" and a "short end" on the main level. Stairs then go up to the dome and down to the lower level, with the lower level below the dome usually offering restrooms or a small lounge area, while the upper portion is usually coach or lounge seating within a "bubble" of glass on the car's roof. Passengers in the upper portion of the dome are able to see in all directions from a vantage point above the train's roofline.

In the United States, the Union Pacific Railroad operated dome dining cars. These cars had a kitchen in the short end, with a pantry in half the space under the dome. The other half of the space under the dome was a private dining room for small groups. Between the pantry and kitchen there was a dumbwaiter to transfer items between the kitchen and the dining area in the dome portion of the car. The "long end" was the main dining area.

The Chicago, Burlington & Quincy Railroad operated mid-train dome-dormitory-buffet-lounge cars on its California Zephyr, Kansas City Zephyr and American Royal Zephyr, and dome-dormitory-coffee shop cars on its Denver Zephyr. The dormitory space was used by on-board train crew such as the dining car staff.

Several railroads operated dome sleeping cars. Those of the Northern Pacific Railway had four bedrooms in the "long end", four roomettes in the "short end" and four duplex single rooms under the dome.

The Wabash Railroad and Chicago, Burlington and Quincy Railroad operated dome parlor cars for first class day service. Wabash's Blue Bird included a Budd dome-parlor-observation as part of its original consist, and later added a Pullman-Standard dome-parlor car. The CB&Q operated dome-parlor-observation cars on the Twin Zephyrs, the Kansas City Zephyr and the Denver Zephyr.

Several railroads operated dome observation cars, usually at the rear of the train. These cars have a dome on top of the car with a rounded-end or flat-end rear "observation" section (on the main floor) where passengers can sit and look out at the receding scenery. These cars often have additional sleeping compartments under the dome and/or in the "short end" as well as a bar and/or additional lounge spaces.

The original California Zephyr, operated in part by the Chicago, Burlington and Quincy Railroad (CB&Q), referred to its car of this type as a Vista-Dome sleeper-lounge-observation, which had one drawing room and three double bedrooms as well as a dome and observation area. The Canadian Pacific Railway outfitted the 1955 Canadian with "Park"-series dome-sleeper-observations, most of which remain in service with Via Rail Canada.

=== Variations ===
While the partial dome cars were the most common, a number of variations on the dome car (typically called "observation" cars) were developed. In particular the full length dome car, the dome lounge car, as well as the "transition" car stand out. In the case of the former, the observation dome extended the full length of the car, with a lower level which contained a lounge or bar beneath it. This type of car was used extensively by the Atchison, Topeka & Santa Fe and Chicago, Milwaukee, St. Paul and Pacific Railroad (Milwaukee Road) railroads.

In 1956, the Santa Fe introduced Hi-Level cars on its El Capitan chair car train. These were built like dome cars, with high floors along their length and a low section between their bogie trucks. The lower level contained low entrance doors and restrooms on chair cars, kitchens on diners, and a wet bar on the "Top of the Cap" lounge cars (which were the only cars of the group that could be called dome cars). Most vestibules were on the upper level. Transition cars were similar to full length chair cars, save in one regard. These cars were intended to serve as a transition between regular rolling stock, and double deck stock. To facilitate this, one vestibule of the car was lower, while the other was at the height of the upper vestibule of the double deck stock. Amtrak used these cars for a time, primarily when cars inherited from other railroads made up the bulk of Amtrak's rolling stock. All these El Capitan cars were used heavily in the early days of Amtrak, and served as a pattern when Amtrak began to purchase, or produce, its own double deck cars. The majority of transition cars were scrapped, though a few were kept in service and rebuilt into more "traditional" high-vestibule double-deck cars.

== Dome lounge ==
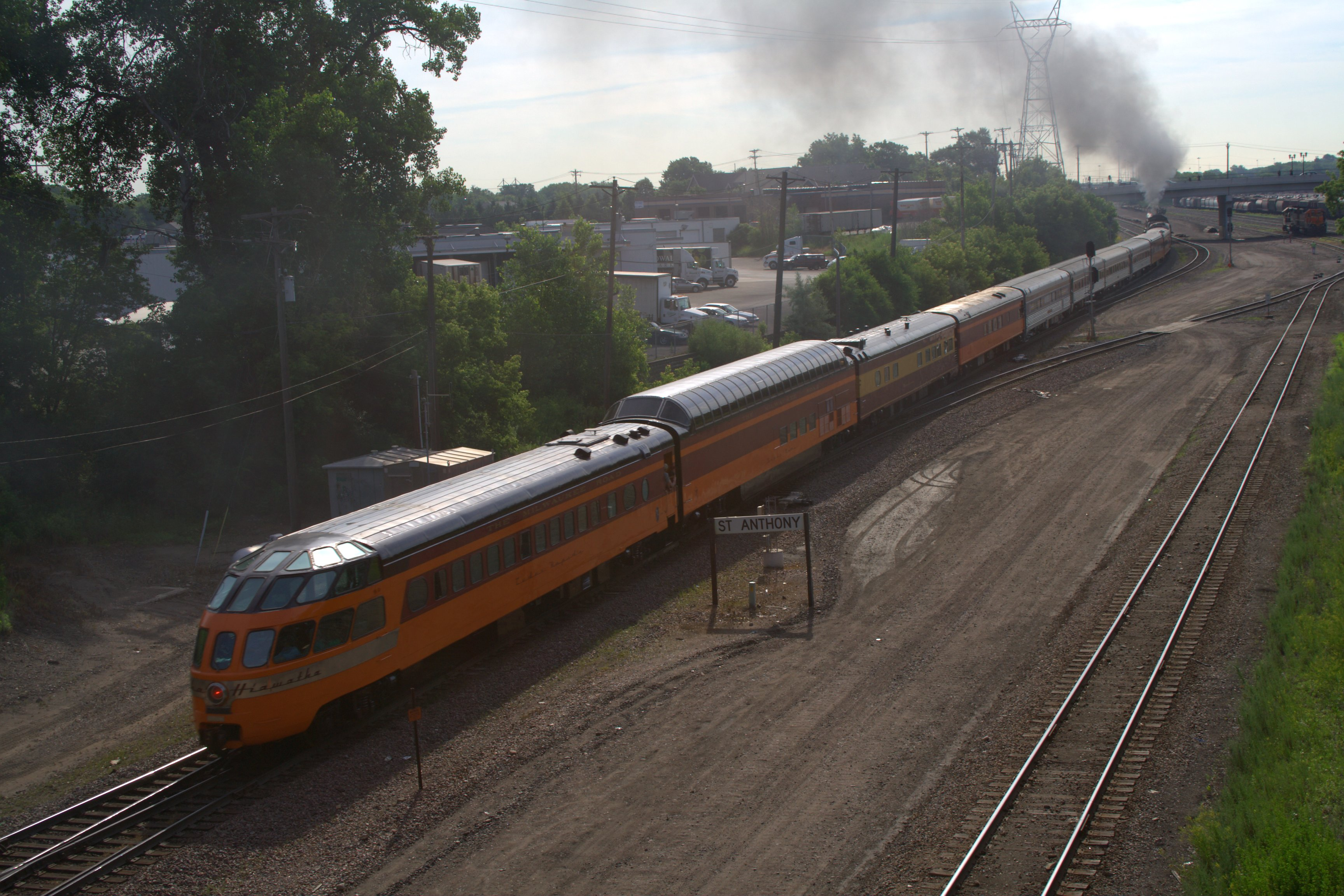
An excursion train pulled by Milwaukee Road 261 with a full-length Super Dome car in 2008

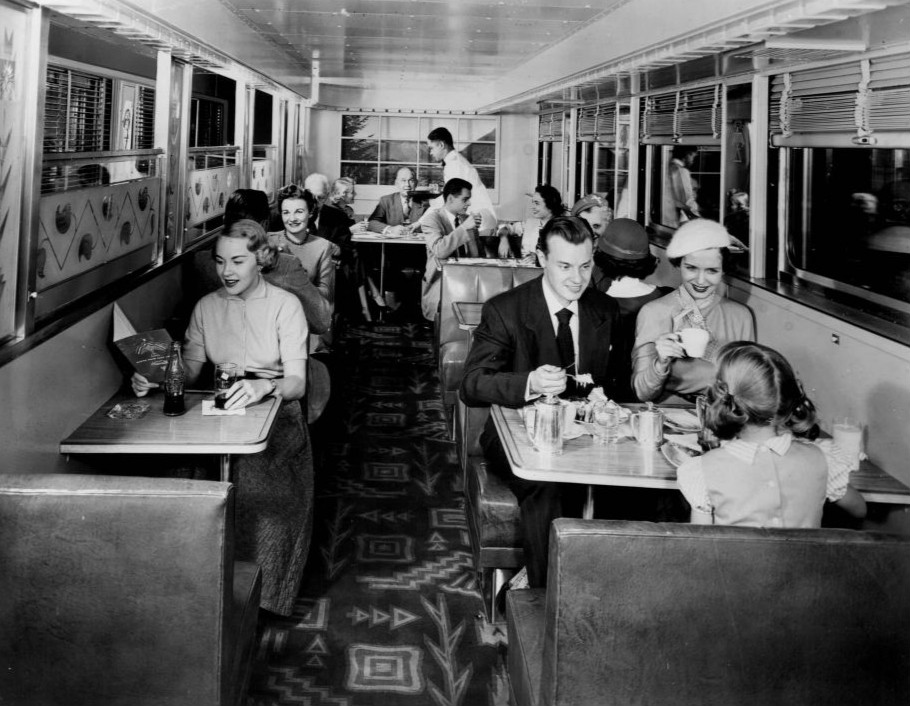
The lower level of a Milwaukee Road Super Dome car in 1952 just before the car was put in regular service

A dome lounge is a type of domed railroad passenger car that includes lounge, cafe, dining or other space on the upper level or both levels of the car. Examples include both short (approximately half the length of the car, with the dome located just forward or just rearward of the car's center) and full (taking almost the entire length of the car). Some examples include sleeping compartments or coach seating.

Classic dome lounges (built during the streamliner era in the U.S. and Canada) include: "Super Dome" full-length cars were built by Pullman-Standard in 1952 for the Chicago, Milwaukee, St. Paul & Pacific, also known as the Milwaukee Road, and operated in the railroad's Hiawatha passenger train fleet. Ten cars were initially constructed, with one of these destroyed in a derailment while on a test run and later rebuilt using new parts and parts salvaged from the original destroyed car.

"Big Dome" full-length cars built by the Budd Company in 1954 for the Atchison, Topeka & Santa Fe for the railroad's passenger train fleet. Fourteen of these were built in two groups, one group of which included crew dormitory space on the lower level.

"Great Dome" full-length cars built by the Budd Company in 1956 for the Great Northern Railway for its Empire Builder train. Six of these were built; one of them was actually owned by the Chicago, Burlington & Quincy, over which the train operated between Chicago and the Twin Cities. One former Great Northern car number 1391, Ocean View, remains in Amtrak ownership.

"Pleasure Dome" short dome cars built by Pullman-Standard in 1950 for the Atchison, Topeka & Santa Fe for its Super Chief train. The six cars had both lounge and dining facilities, including the unique "Turquoise Room", a small dining area identified by the turquoise Native American medallion displayed on one of the room's walls.

"Vista Dome" short dome cars built by the Budd Company for the Chicago, Burlington & Quincy for its Zephyr passenger trains. Examples included two dome-parlor-observations built in 1947 for the Twin Zephyrs; six dome-buffet-lounges and six dome-sleeper-observations built in 1949 for the California Zephyr; two dome-coach-buffet-lounges and two dome-parlor-observations built in 1953 for the Kansas City Zephyr; and two dome-buffet-lounges and two dome-parlor-observations built in 1956 for the Denver Zephyr. The California Zephyr cars included those built for the Denver & Rio Grande Western and the Western Pacific, which were partners with the CB&Q on the train's route between Chicago and the San Francisco Bay area.

"Vista Dome" short dome cars built for the Wabash Railroad. The Budd Company built a dome-parlor-observation in 1950 for the railroad's Blue Bird; Pullman-Standard built a dome-parlor for the same train in 1952.

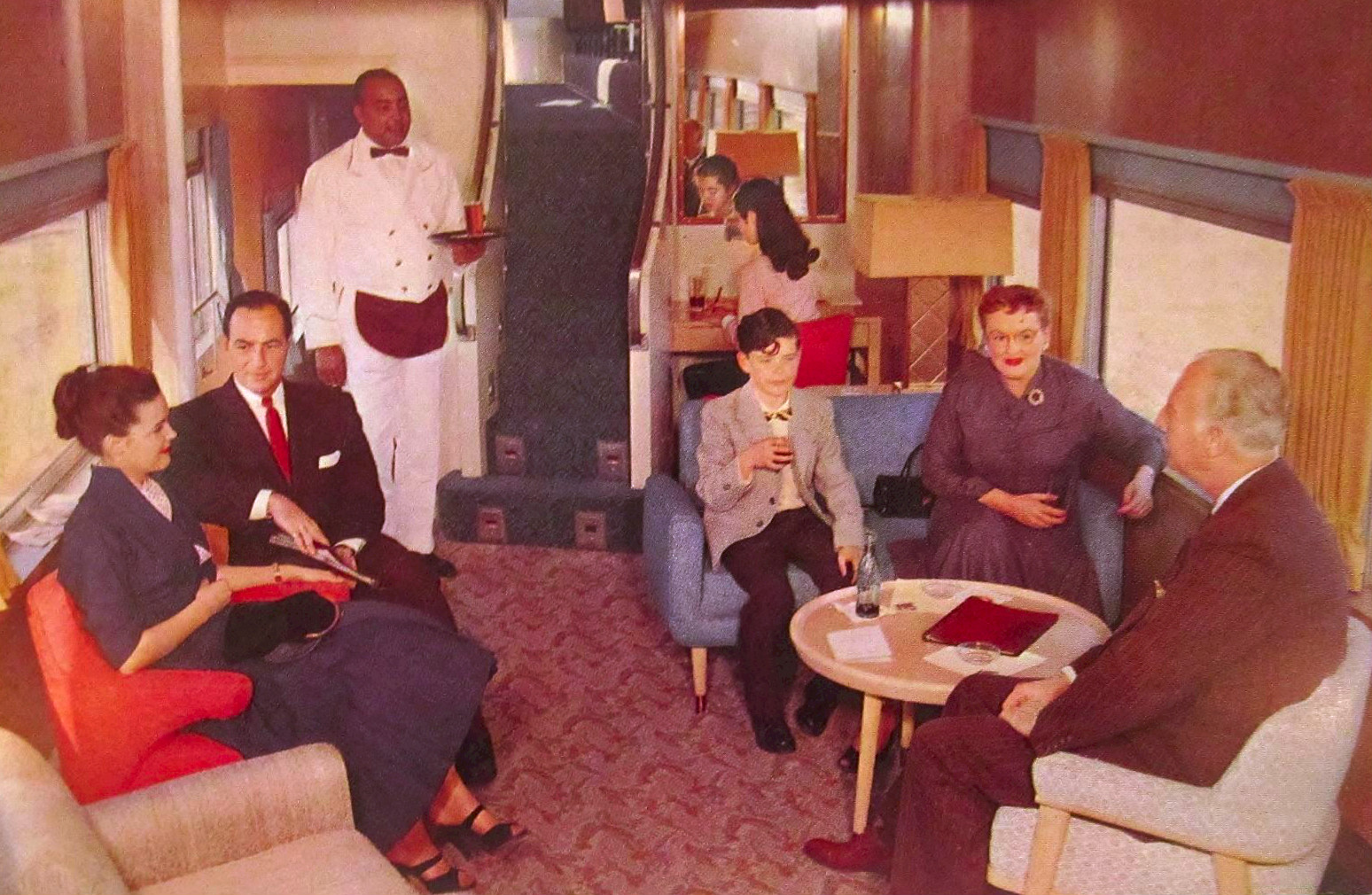
A postcard showing the interior of an Astra Dome car in the 1950s

"Astra Dome" short dome cars built by American Car & Foundry in 1955 for the Union Pacific Railroad and operated on the City of Los Angeles, City of Portland and other UP passenger trains. The railroad purchased 15 dome-lounge-observations.

"Skyline" dome-coach-buffet-lounges and "Park" dome-sleeper-observations built by the Budd Company in 1955 for the Canadian Pacific Railway. The CPR purchased 18 of each car type for its Canadian and Dominion passenger trains.

"Stairway to the Stars" cars constructed by the Southern Pacific Railroad for its Daylight passenger trains. The railroad built seven cars in its own shops, using components from retired cars and dome components supplied by the Budd Company. These cars were more accurately three-quarter-length domes, since the dome level was more than half the length of the car but did not extend the full length.

=== Waning years of original passenger train use ===
Most of these cars remained in service for their original owners up to the end of privately run passenger trains in North America in the 1970s. In the U.S., most cars moved on to Amtrak or to operators such as Auto Train. A few remained in business car service for their original railroads. In Canada, the entire Canadian Pacific fleet went to Via Rail.

== History ==
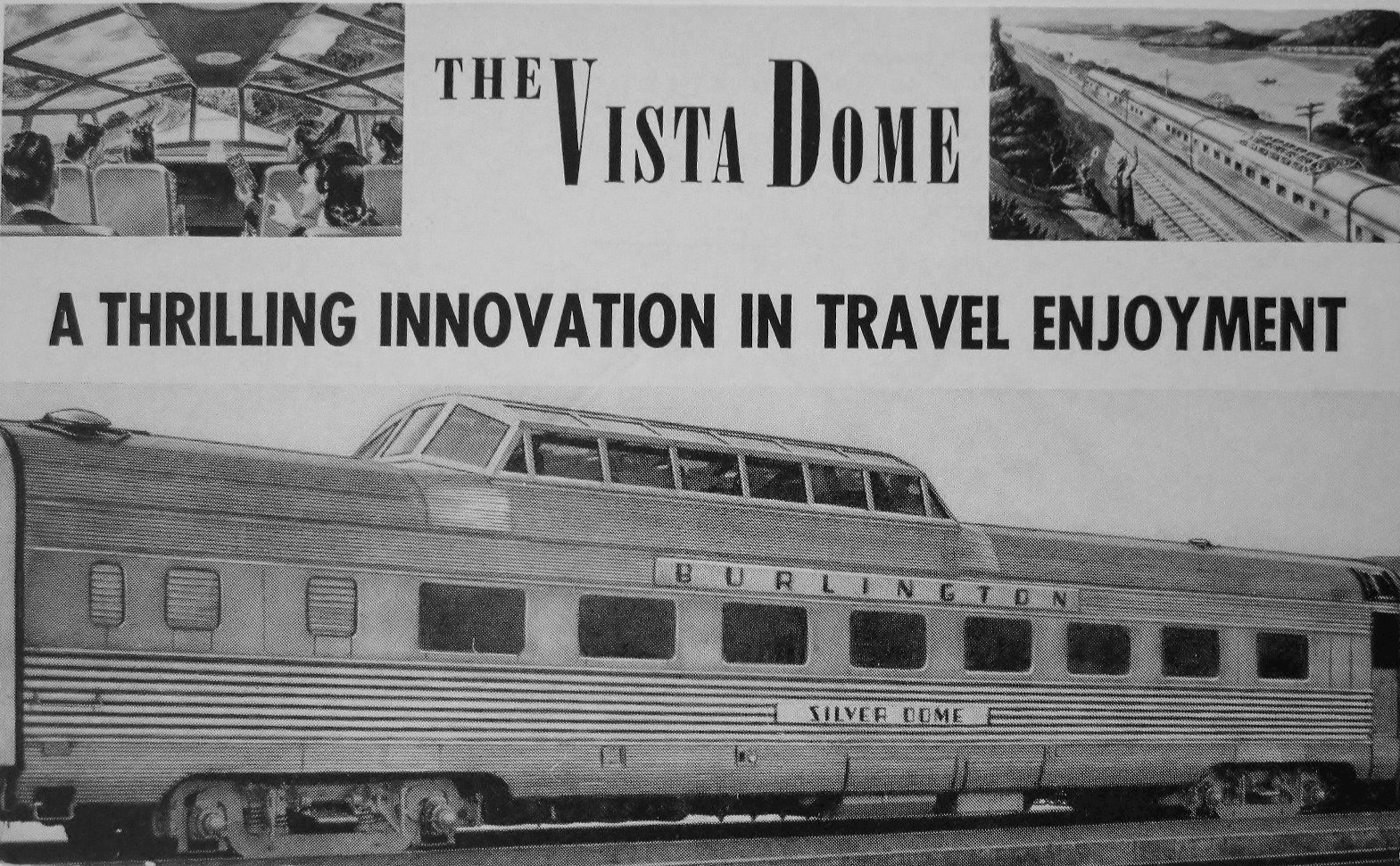
Silver Dome, the first Burlington Vista-Dome car

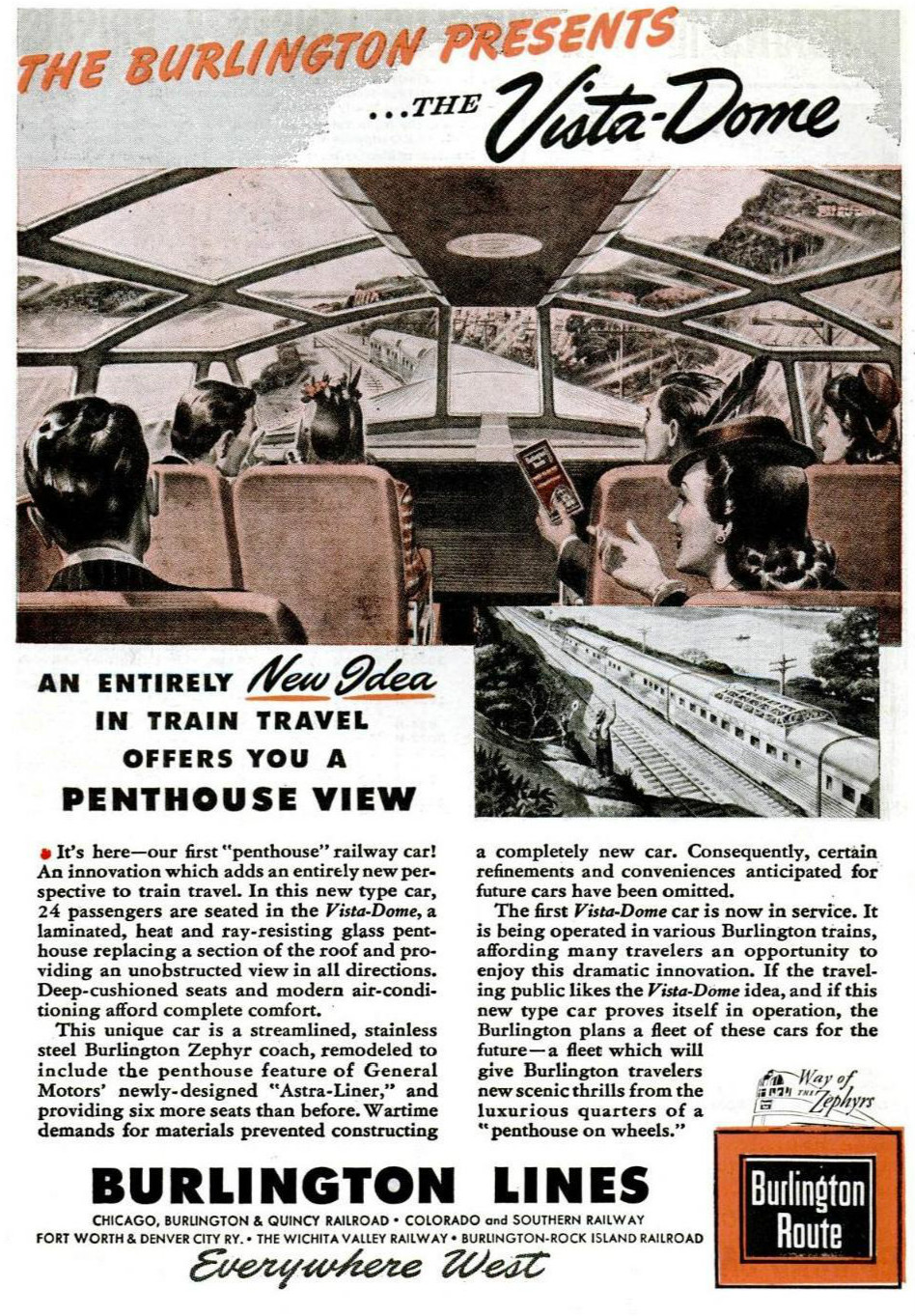
A 1945 advertisement announcing the first dome car. The Burlington tested the popularity of the car by switching it onto various train routes. The railroad promised to build a fleet of these cars if they were successful.

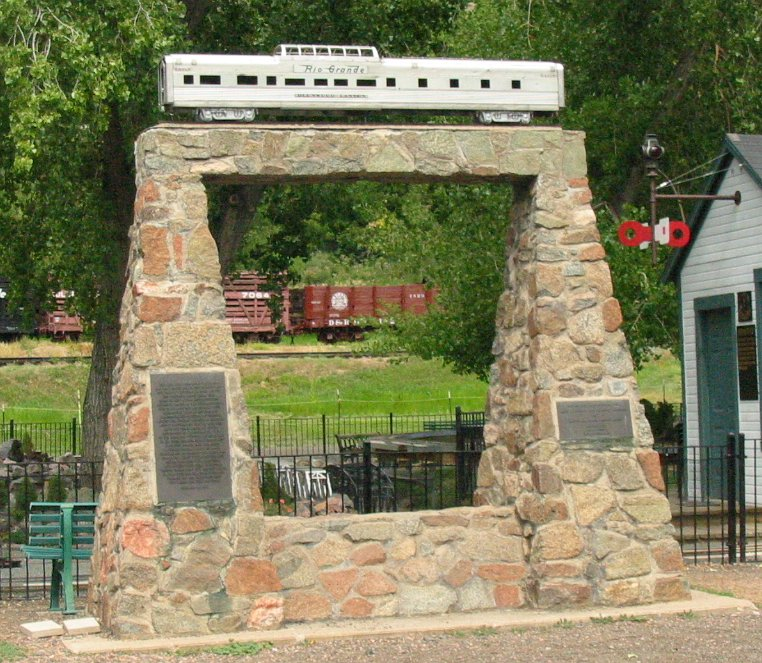
The monument from Glenwood Canyon in its current location at the Colorado Railroad Museum

Although the design of a dome car can be likened to a cupola caboose, the dome car's development is not directly related. The earliest documented predecessor of the dome car was first developed in the 1880s; known at the time as the "birdcage car", it was used on an 1882 sightseeing tour on the Chicago, Burlington and Quincy Railroad. In 1891, T. J. McBride received a patent for a car design called an "observation-sleeper"; illustrations of the design in Scientific American at the time showed a car with three observation domes. Canadian Pacific Railway used "tourist cars" with raised, glass-sided viewing cupolas on their trains through the Canadian Rocky Mountains in the 1920s.

These dome car designs did not prove successful, and further refinements to the idea didn't come for a few decades. The first successful dome cars were conceived by Cyrus Osborn of General Motors Electro-Motive Division (EMD). In 1944, while traveling in an EMD-built Denver & Rio Grande Western locomotive through Glenwood Canyon in Colorado, he recognized the wonderful views the passengers could enjoy from a panoramic dome. His idea was to provide a full 360-degree view from above the train in newly built "Vista-Dome" cars.

Mr. Osborn took the idea to the Chicago, Burlington and Quincy Railroad (CB&Q). The CB&Q took a stainless steel Budd-built coach and rebuilt it at their shops in Aurora, Illinois, with the Vista Dome imagined and sketched by Cyrus Osborn. The dome area featured seats that were positioned lengthwise in the cabin facing double-pane windows which were designed to improve insulation. This first Vista Dome was called, appropriately, Silver Dome. On July 23, 1945, the car was tested in the consist of the Twin Cities Zephyr. Vista Domes quickly found their way into many Burlington Zephyr consists, culminating in 1949 with the inauguration of the California Zephyr.

Soon after Silver Dome entered service, railroad managers and passenger train executives met to discuss the merits of the dome car design. In the United States, domes could only be readily used on railroads west of the Mississippi, due to lower clearances in tunnels in the eastern USA. (In Canada, Canadian Pacific would run its domes from coast to coast.) The managers also noted that the passenger carrying space was regarded as non-revenue space because the managers believed that passengers would not want to spend their entire trip in the domes. These factors and the added costs of car construction in adding stairs, two levels of car floors and air conditioning increased the costs to railroads that chose to operate dome cars.

Despite the costs involved, Pullman completed the first four production dome cars for GM's Train of Tomorrow in 1947. The four cars, dubbed Astra Liners, included a coach, diner, sleeper and lounge-observation., were similar to Silver Dome and were displayed to the press on numerous private charters and to the public at the Chicago Railroad Fairs in 1948 and 1949 before they were sold to Union Pacific Railroad for use between Portland, Oregon and Seattle, Washington. Other passenger car manufacturers soon built their own dome car models to compete with Pullman; Budd's first domes, completed in Fall 1947, were the first to feature curved glass and full streamlining effects on the domes and entered service on the Burlington's Twin Zephyrs between Chicago and Minneapolis-St. Paul. The Chesapeake and Ohio Railway was the first to operate dome cars east of Chicago in 1948 on their Pere Marquette District routes between Western Michigan and Chicago, and in 1949 Baltimore and Ohio Railroad became the first railroad to operate dome cars on the east coast when it introduced Pullman-built "Strata-Dome" coaches as part of the new consists for the Baltimore-Chicago Columbian. B&O also went so far as to add floodlights on the roofs of its dome cars to illuminate the scenery during nighttime travel.

On September 14, 1950, a monument was established at Glenwood Canyon. Called "Monument to an Idea", this monument celebrated the Vista Dome at the place where it was first inspired. In the late 1980s, the monument was moved to the Colorado Railroad Museum in Golden, Colorado, to make way for expansion of Interstate 70.

The first ten full-length domes were built by Pullman for the Milwaukee Road's Chicago-Seattle Olympian Hiawatha. The Milwaukee Road paid $320,000 each for their "Super Domes" and used them on that route until 1961, after which four cars remained in service between Chicago and the Twin Cities; these last four were sold to Amtrak upon its formation in 1971. Like most Pullman domes the Milwaukee domes were 15 ft 6 in (4,720 mm) tall rather than the Budd/ACF standard 15 ft 10 in (4,830 mm). The Santa Fe and Great Northern also bought full-length domes from Budd in 1954 and 1955. All but one of Santa Fe's cars were sold to Auto-Train in 1971.

As railroad passenger ridership declined in the late 1950s, some railroads retired dome cars due to the maintenance costs. Other railroads that had not purchased dome cars new bought them second-hand. Illinois Central purchased several cars from Missouri Pacific and Canadian National bought several cars from Milwaukee Road, for example. Because of their enormous usage of sealed glass, the cooling of the cars required massive air-conditioning capacity. Maintenance and repair of these cars was costly. Breakdown of the air-conditioning system on the road, even in winter, could render a car unusable.

Since the 1980s, dome cars have become rare since Amtrak introduced Superliner bi-level passenger cars that are 16 feet (4.9 m) tall over the length of the car. Dome cars are very popular on tourist railways and private charter rail services. Some railroad museums have preserved several dome cars. These cars are very popular with visitors who often remember the spectacular rides they had in these cars.

While the dome car is a mostly North American feature, a few also operated in the scenic areas of Europe. The German Federal Railways had five low-profile dome cars built in the early-to-mid 1960s for its Rheingold and Rheinpfeil trains. From June 1973 to May 1976, the Trans-Europe Express train Erasmus also carried dome cars.

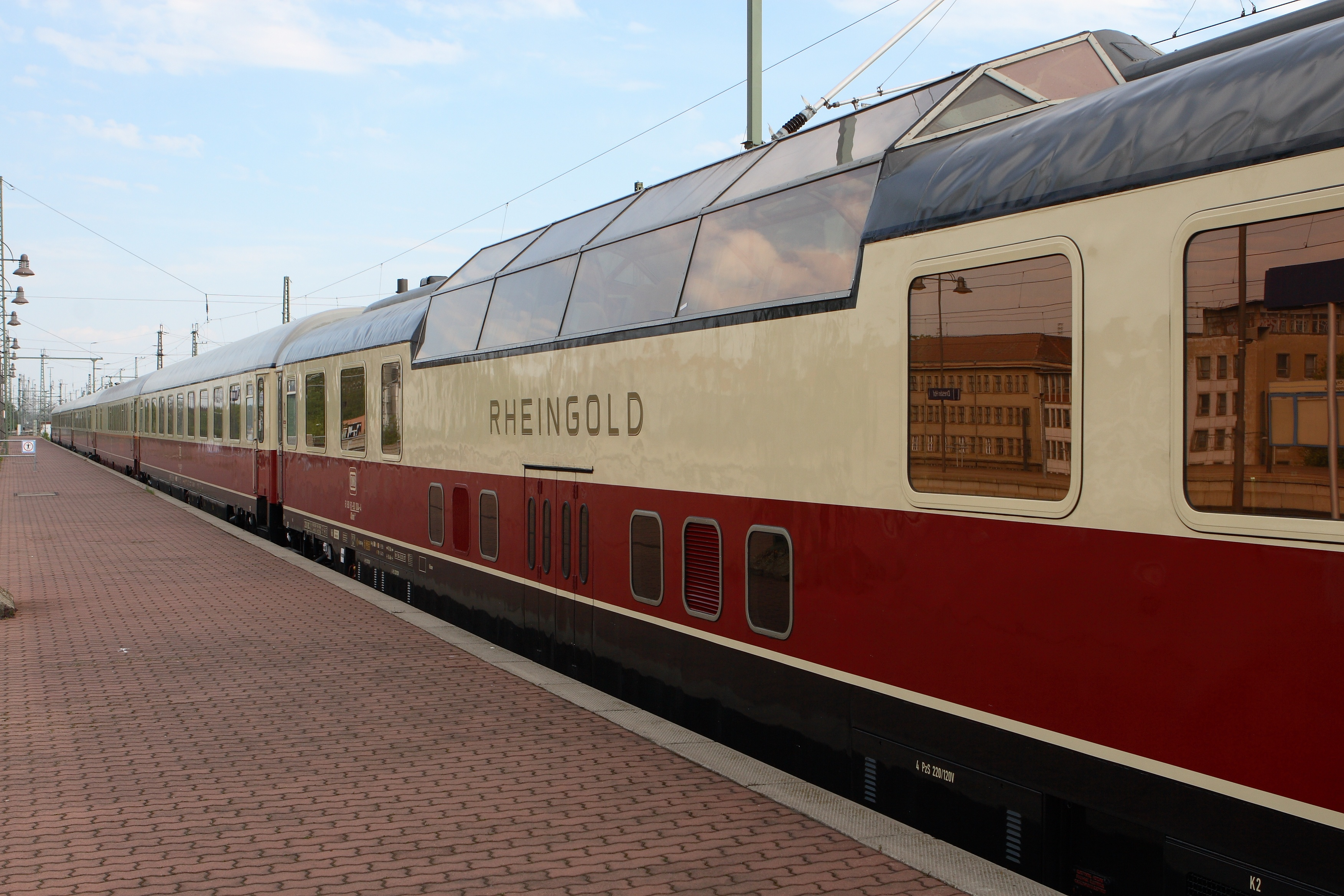
A Deutsche Bundesbahn low profile dome car

After being retired from regular service, these cars have been operated in excursion and charter service throughout Europe.

== Current usage ==
Most dome lounges survive as of 2023. Some are in excursion train or dinner train service, while others are on display in museums. A few remain in business car service. Most of the original Canadian Pacific cars remain in service on the transcontinental Canadian train operated by Via Rail Canada.

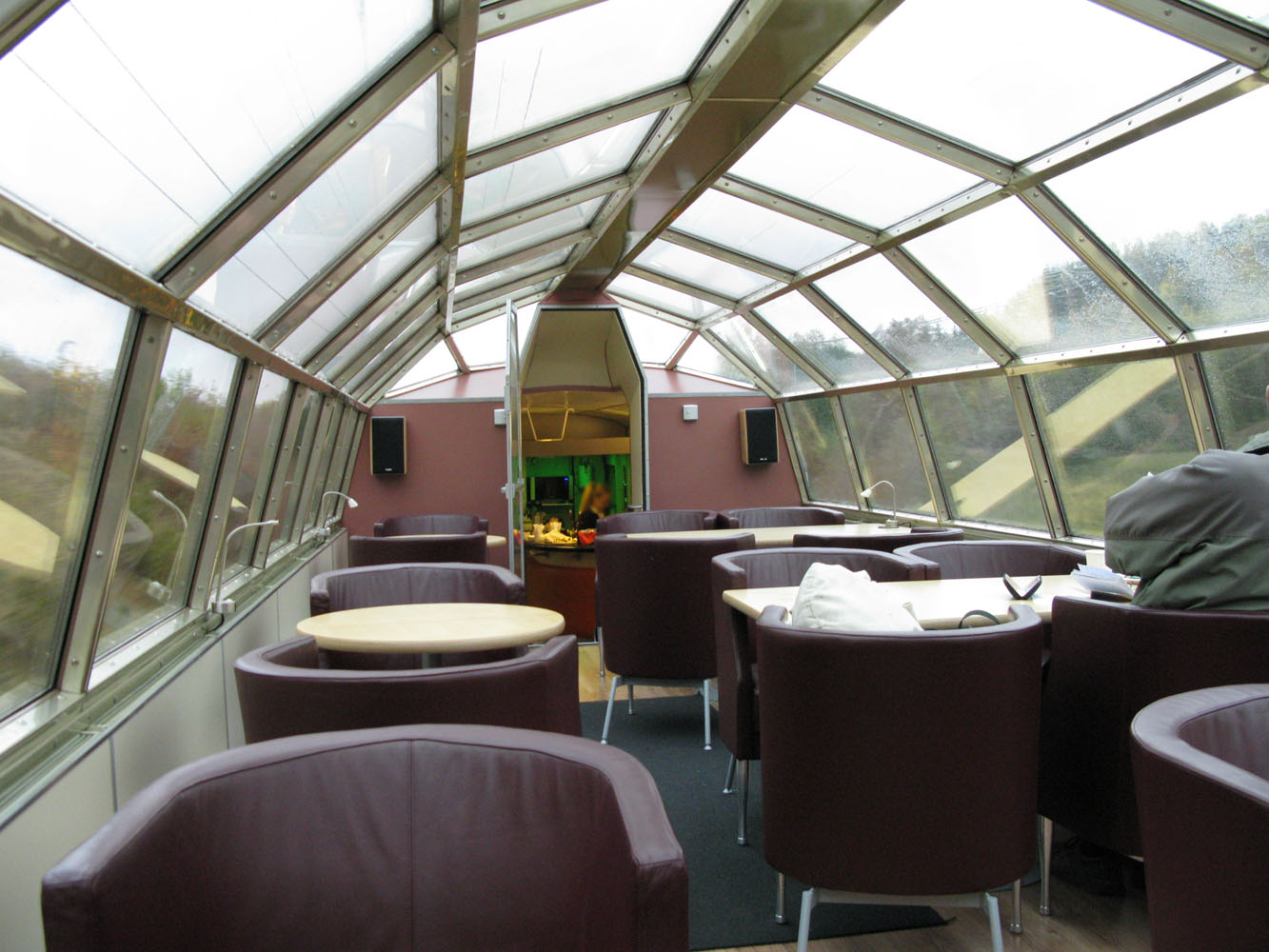
Interior of a Netrail P1 dome lounge in a train traveling through Stockholm, Sweden, in 2009

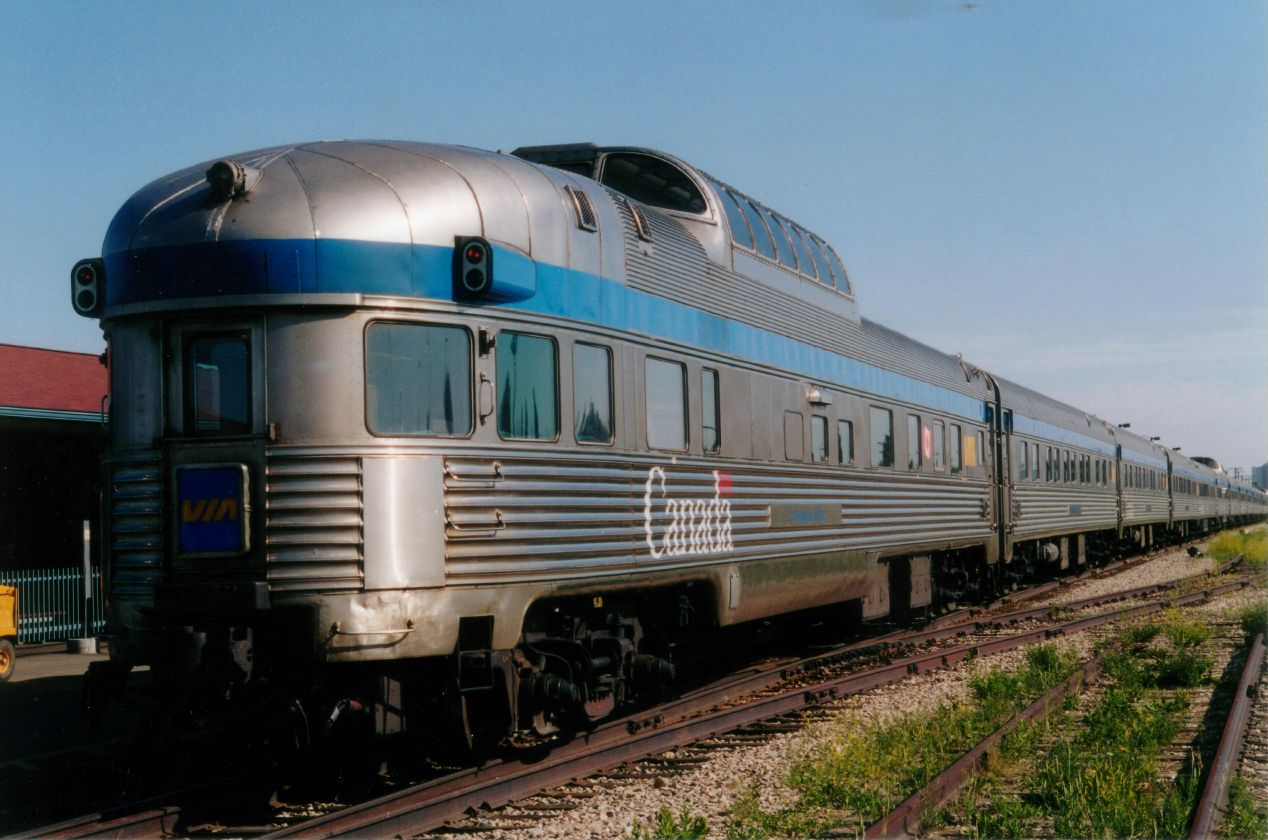
Park series sleeper-dome-lounge cars are usually on the rear of the Canadian and Ocean.

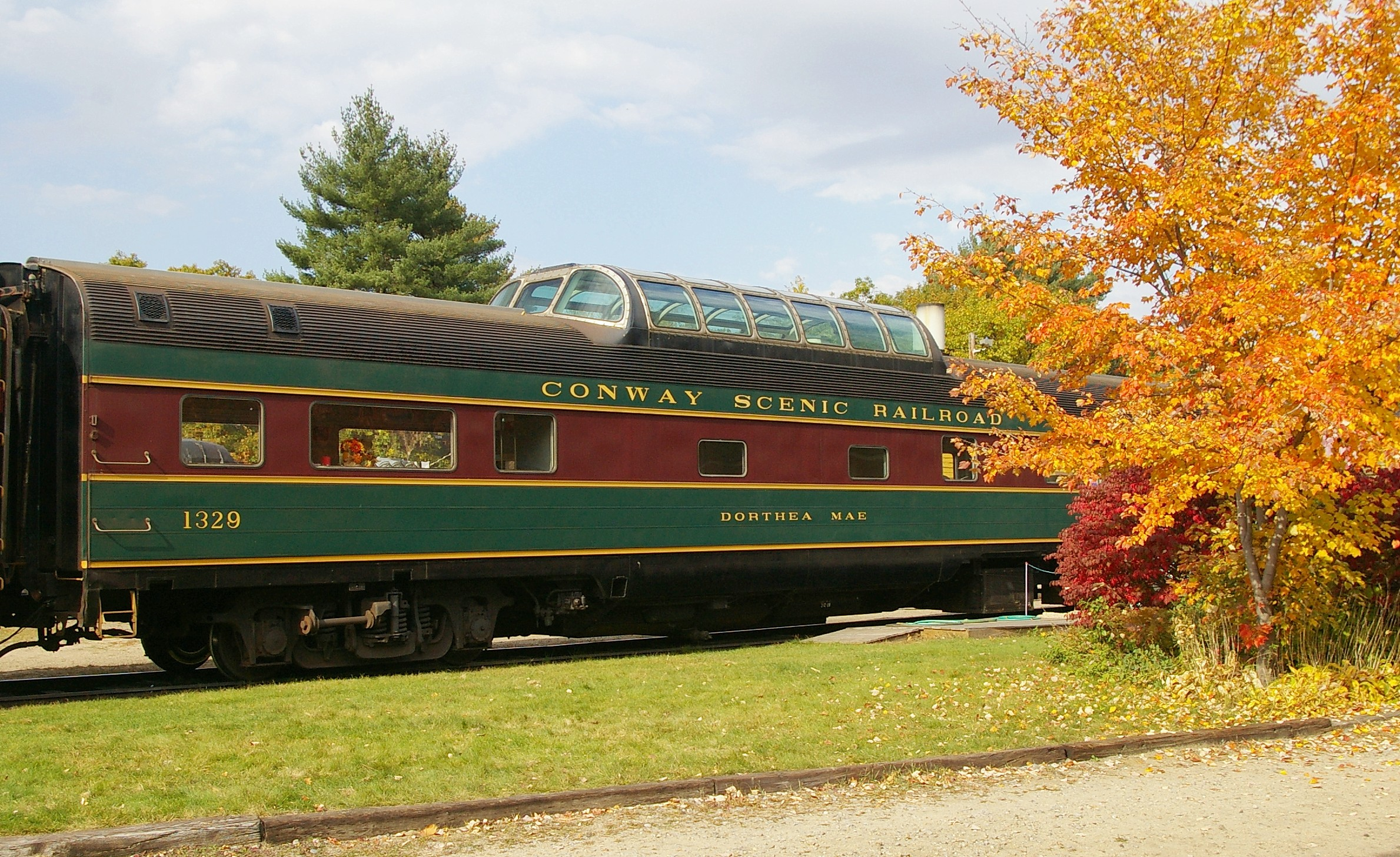
Ex-Great Northern dome car "Dorothea Mae" on the Conway Scenic Railroad in 2008

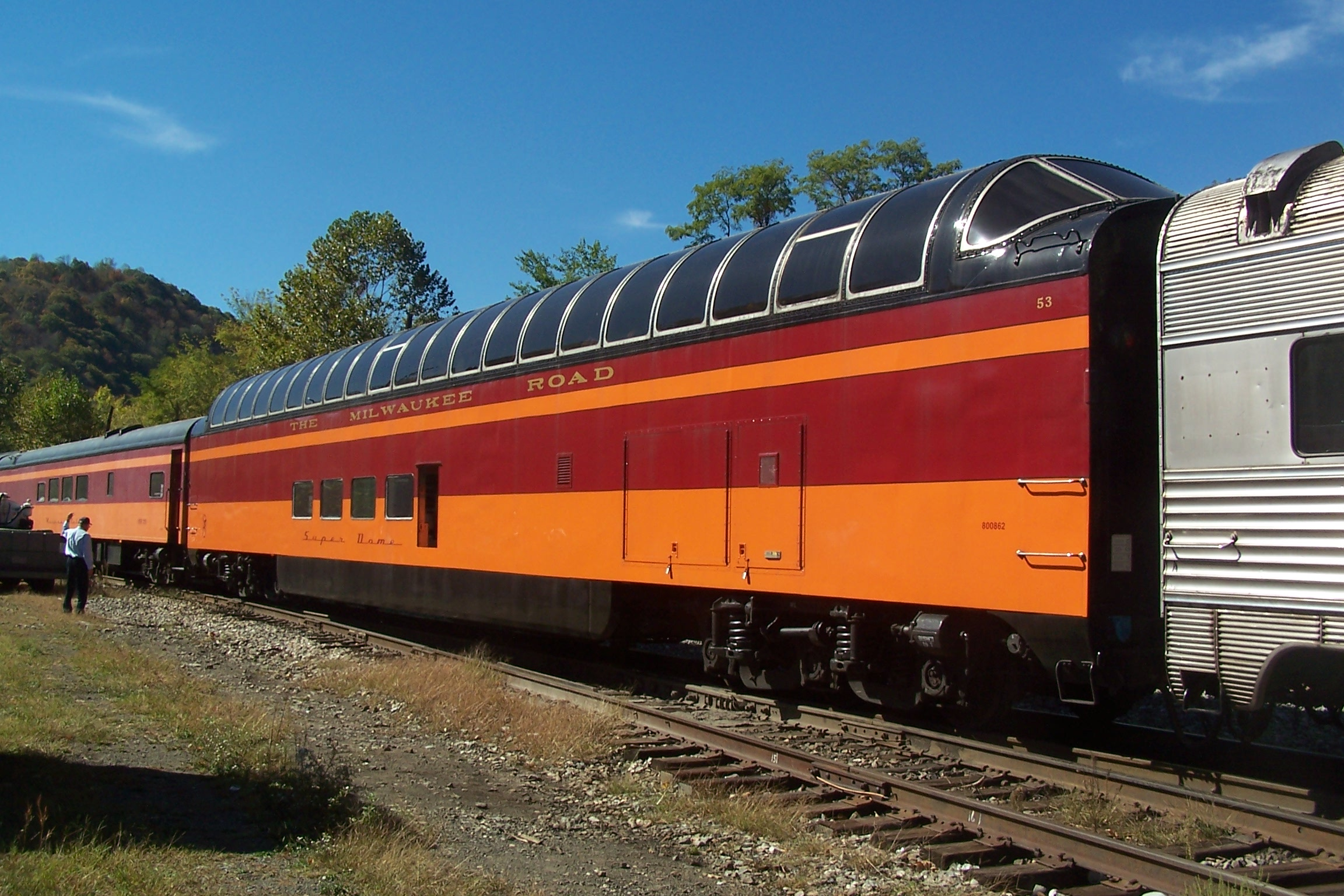
A full-length dome car. This preserved example is from the Milwaukee Road.

=== Canada ===
Via Rail Canada operates the largest fleet (28) of true dome cars in the classic sense in that they offer a 360° view of the scenery. All were built by Budd for the Canadian Pacific Railway in 1954-1955 and transferred to Via service in 1978, where they continue in service.

The Ontario Northland Railway operates dome cars on the Polar Bear Express from Cochrane to Moosonee.

The Canadian National Railway operates a former Great Northern dome coach in its business car fleet.

In 2018, Canadian Pacific acquired ex-Southern Pacific dome car #3605. It was rebuilt and repainted into Canadian Pacific's Tuscan red and gold livery, and renamed 'Selkirk' while retaining its road number. The car is now being used on the business train as well as the Royal Canadian Pacific excursion train.

The Orford Express dinner/excursion train, which operates out of Sherbrooke, Quebec, Canada, includes a former Northern Pacific dome sleeper.

=== India ===
Indian Railways (IR) is currently using 41 Vistadome coaches in different railway zones of the country. IR planned to introduce 49 more Vistadome coaches by the end of 2021 to meet the growing demand of tourists.

=== Panama ===
The Panama Canal Railway operates a 1950s-vintage dome car originally built by Southern Pacific on its route between Panama City and Colón, alongside the Panama Canal.

=== Peru ===
A Vistadome Observatory train is operated by PeruRail on the line to Machu Picchu.

=== United States ===
Manufacturing companies such as Colorado Railcar have built modern dome cars with updated versions of original dome design, used by American Orient Express, Holland America, Princess Tours, Alaska Railroad, Royal Caribbean, Via Rail Canada and Rocky Mountaineer Railtours. Several of the private railroad cars available for charter listed on the American Association of Private Railroad Car Owners' website have domes.

A new generation of dome lounges currently operate in cruise train service in Alaska and Canada. These do not necessarily use the traditional dome design, but are more similar to the bi-level design first seen in commuter-style "gallery" cars on U.S. railroads in the 1950s and on the "Hi-Level" cars built by the Budd Company in 1956 for the Atchison, Topeka & Santa Fe El Capitan train.

Most of these cars were constructed by Colorado Railcar Company of Fort Lupton, Colorado. Some early versions were built by Tillamook Railcar of Tillamook, Oregon, which operated out of an old U.S. Navy airship hangar at the Tillamook Airport. The owner of Tillamook Railcar later went on to form Colorado Railcar. These early versions were reconstructed from retired commuter "gallery" cars. More recent ones were built new, and several of these are longer and taller than the classic passenger car design.

Amtrak operated one dome car, #10031. It is a Budd full-length dome car, former Great Northern Railway #1391 "Ocean View" up until 2019. Painted in Phase III paint, it is used on special services such as the Oakland to Reno "Reno Fun Train", or the Seattle to Leavenworth "Snow Train". Amtrak has also operated the car in fall foliage service on the New York-Montreal "Adirondack" and on several of its Chicago-based regional trains. In the summertime, dome car #10031 is used on the single level Pacific Surfliner trainset. Another dome car Amtrak used (no longer in service) was on the Capitol Limited, possibly removed when the train switched to Superliner I & II cars. The Ocean View dome car has since been sold to Paxrail.

In addition, the following railroads and tourist railways operate one or more domes:

- Silver Dome is on display at the Mad River and NKP Railroad Museum in Bellevue, Ohio.
- The Grand Canyon Railway operates dome coaches between Williams, Arizona and the south rim of the Grand Canyon. These are former Great Northern, Northern Pacific and Denver & Rio Grande Western cars. It also has a former Great Northern full-length dome lounge from the former American Orient Express fleet.
- The Western Pacific Railroad Museum at Portola, California, rosters several Budd-built Vista-Dome cars from the original California Zephyr train. These are being restored as part of the museum's Zephyr Project, a program to re-create the CZ experience.
- The Napa Valley Wine Train operates a 1952-vintage Pullman-Standard Super Dome lounge originally built for the Milwaukee Road, which it uses as one of its dining areas on its daily service.
- The Alaska Railroad operates older, traditional dome cars on several trains, in addition to the newer custom-built Ultra Dome cars found on its Denali Star train between Anchorage and Fairbanks.
- The Union Pacific Railroad operates several traditional dome cars as part of its business and excursion car fleet. These cars include dome coaches, dome dining cars and dome lounges, and all were once part of the railroad's famed "City" fleet of passenger trains. These cars often appear in special trains pulled by the railroad's two historic preserved steam locomotives, 4-8-4 "Northern" #844 and 4-8-8-4 "Big Boy" #4014.
- The Burlington Northern Santa Fe Railway (BNSF) has two dome lounge cars, a former Santa Fe car "Bay View" and a former Great Northern car, "Glacier View" in its business car fleet. Bay View often appears on the employee appreciation excursions which operate on each BNSF operating division every few years while Glacier View is used as a lounge on business and officers' specials. Glacier View was rebuilt with a large observation window on the rear much like the lounge car "William Barstow Strong".
- The Royal Gorge Route Railroad and the Rio Grande Scenic Railroad operate former Santa Fe, Great Northern and Milwaukee Road full-length domes in excursion service on their respective routes in central and southern Colorado. A unique feature of the Rio Grande Scenic service is the chance to ride in a modern dome car behind a vintage steam locomotive.
- The Mount Hood Railroad operates a former Santa Fe full-length dome lounge on its excursion trains out of Hood River, Ore.
- The Kansas City Southern Railway operates two former Union Pacific domes, a coach and a dining car, in its business car fleet.
- The Branson Scenic Railroad in Missouri owns several former CB&Q domes and operates a dome car on all excursions.
- The Conway Scenic Railroad in New Hampshire operates a former Great Northern Railway dome coach on the Crawford Notch train.
- The Cafe Lafayette Dinner Train in New Hampshire includes a former Missouri Pacific dome coach.
- The Delaware & Ulster Railroad operates a former Missouri Pacific dome coach on its "Rip Van Winkle Flyer" dinner train in New York's Catskill Mountains.
- The Reading, Blue Mountain and Northern Railroad operates two former Milwaukee Road Super Dome lounges and a former Santa Fe (ex-SLRG) Super Dome car in its business car/excursion fleet.
- The Arkansas & Missouri Railroad operates a former Western Pacific Budd dome coach in excursion service. This car was originally built for the California Zephyr and later used on the original Auto Train, as part of the Pacific Starlight Dinner Train on BC Rail, and for the Ontario Northland Railway.
- The Saratoga & North Creek Railway operates several ex-Santa Fe Budd dome lounges in passenger service between Saratoga Springs and North Creek, N.Y.
- The Santa Cruz & Monterey Bay Railway operated a former Santa Fe Budd dome lounge on its 2012 "Train To Christmas Town" excursions between Watsonville and Santa Cruz, Calif., and ran a former Union Pacific dome diner on its 2013 trips. The dome diner, as well as a former Milwaukee Road dome lounge and a former Atchison, Topeka & Santa Fe dome lounge, are part of the former Spirit of Washington Dinner Train consist that was acquired by the railroad's parent company.
- Iowa Pacific Holdings is the parent company for the Saratoga & North Creek and the Santa Cruz & Monterey Bay, as well as the Mount Hood Railroad and the Rio Grande Scenic Railroad, two other dome operators listed here.
- Iowa Pacific also operates Pullman Rail Journeys on the Amtrak City of New Orleans route between Chicago and New Orleans. This consist includes a former Santa Fe Budd dome lounge configured for dining service, and the company also has a former Northern Pacific dome-sleeper available for this service.
- Pan Am Railways operates a former Wabash dome coach on its business car train.
- The Heart of Dixie Railroad Museum operates a Missouri Pacific Railroad Planetarium Dome coach on its Calera & Shelby Railroad. The coach was built as MP 892 in 1948, renumbered to MP 592 in 1968. After being purchased by the Illinois Central, it was renumbered 2202. The museum purchased the car for steam excursion service in 1972 keeping the 2202 but replacing Illinois Central on the letter boards with Heart of Dixie. In 2015, the Heart of Dixie Railroad Museum restored the car's exterior to its original MP 892 colors and numbering.
- Norfolk Southern Railway operates a full dome as part of its executive office car train (OCS). Former ATSF, the dome was last owned by Conrail for its own OCS train and was acquired by NS during the Conrail acquisition.
- The Indiana DOT funded Hoosier State, operated by Amtrak, had used equipment provided by Iowa Pacific which included a Budd ex-Santa Fe dome lounge, until early 2018.

== Documentary ==
Dome rail travel was highlighted in the PBS-aired program Dome Car Magic. Produced by award-winning Richard Luckin, it is narrated by actor Michael Gross and chronicles the history of the railroad sightseeing cars, from Burlington's 1945 "Silver Dome" to the full-length models operating today in Alaska and Canada.

== See also ==
- Bilevel car
- List of North American dome cars
- Observation car
- Park series
- Passenger car (rail)
- Skytop Lounge
- Sun Lounge
- Superliner (railcar)
