= Observation car =

Train car with large windows for rear viewing

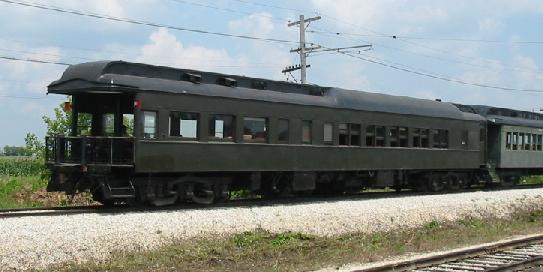
A heavyweight observation on display at the Illinois Railway Museum

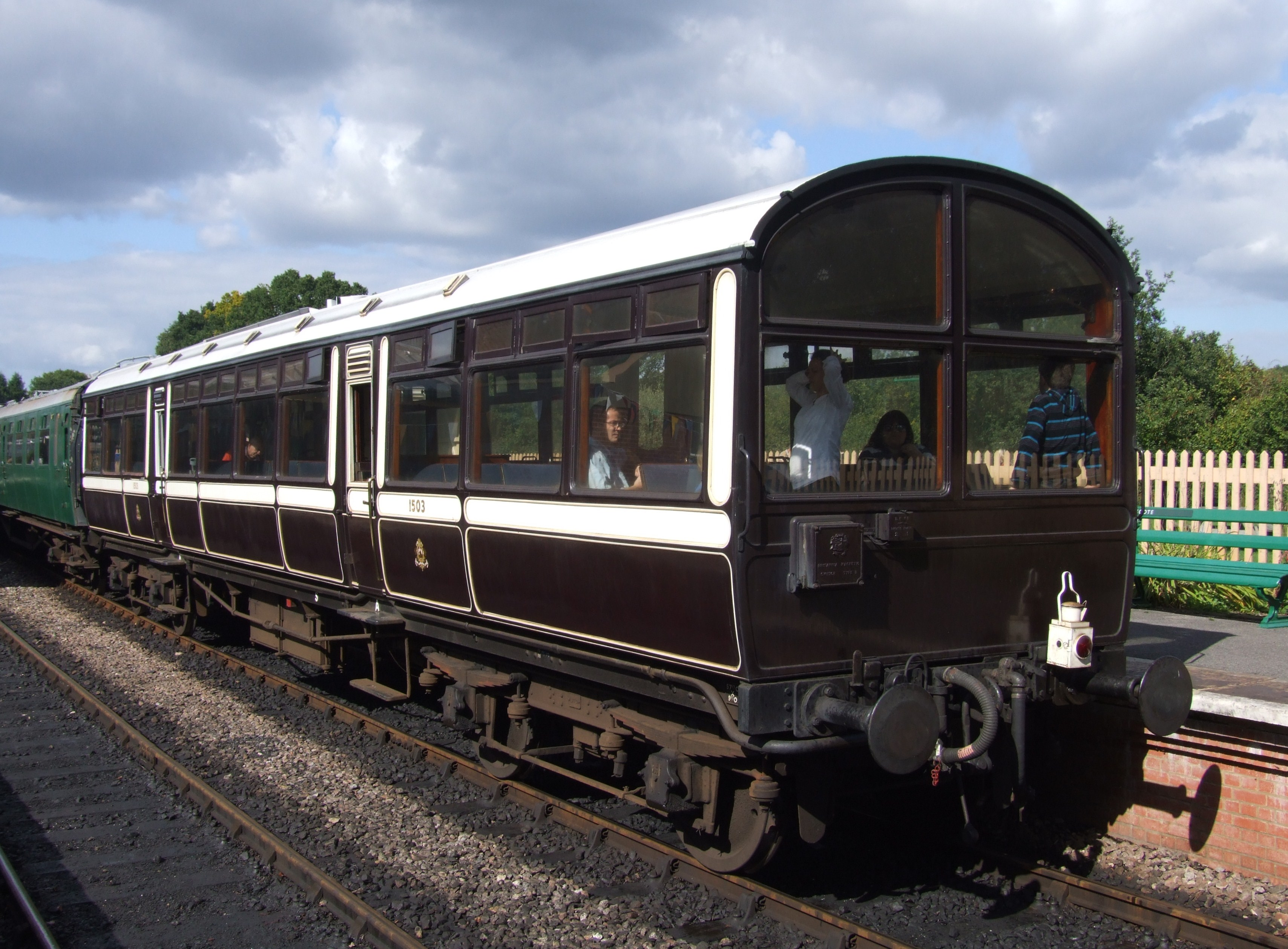
LNWR observation car No 1503 at Kingscote, Bluebell Railway

An observation car/carriage/coach (in US English, often abbreviated to simply observation or obs) is a type of railroad passenger car, generally operated in a passenger train as the rearmost carriage (the same as a caboose), with windows or a platform on the rear of the car for passengers' viewing pleasure. The cars were nearly universally removed from service on American railroads beginning in the 1950s as a cost-cutting measure in order to eliminate the need to "turn" the trains when operating out of stub-end terminals.

The push-pull mode of operation removes this limitation. In Europe, various trains are now fitted with observation cars at either or both ends.

== Configuration ==
The main spotting feature of observation cars is at the "B" end (tail) of the car; the walls of lightweight and streamlined cars usually round together to form a tapered U shape, smoothly or with a door, and larger panoramic windows were installed all around the end of the car. On older heavyweight cars, the rear end of the car consisted of an enlarged, canopied porch-like open vestibule platform area, with the door and enlarged windows set back into the car, giving wind-wing shelter from the draft. Whether old or new there was frequently a large open lounge in the B end where passengers could enjoy the view as they watched the track recede into the distance, and usually (but not always) equipped as a club car with a bar or buffet where soft drinks, cocktails and snacks could be purchased. This differs from non-revenue business cars or private varnish, which may have featured (starting with the A end;) the normally locked center communicating door to a corridor along one side, leading to the salon with doors to a pantry and small galley which was often convertible to a dormitory for the chef and porter/steward at night with cutting board covering a sink, a combination oven/stove/hot-water-tank/steam-heating-boiler and diminished side door for loading supplies, then a private restroom/bathing-room, one or two deluxe private rooms for a personal secretary perhaps and the line's vice president, a locked china/silver/liquor cabinet along the final dividing wall facing a large open multipurpose salon. The salon was often fitted with fold down overhead bunks above a retractable dining/conference table over sub-deck storage, a conductor's desk with secured storage for train log, wine log, and merchant's account books along with relevant gauges such as air pressure and speedometer at the track inspection viewing window recessed behind the expanded observation platform, which was fenced with opulent railing supporting an (optional) illuminated drumhead at the B end. Fresh drinking water, grey water, kerosene/fuel and other tanks crowded beneath the floor sill competed for space with heating/cooling, axle powered mechanical equipment, shore-power batteries and equipment/tool storage bins to support a self-sustaining/self-reliant car whether on the road or on a siding while making track orders. This variety of features is easy to spot with a variety of window placement and sizes, while observation car windows tend to be more uniform in size and placement.

Among North American railroads, their observation cars often featured any of a variety of upcharge revenue seating, reserved sitting/drawing rooms or sleeper roomettes in the forward section, in the form of reclining coach seats, plush parlor car chairs near side tables or bedrooms and the occasional crew dormitory, such configurations varying greatly between railroads. A lighted drumhead adornment, usually indicating the name of the train or the name/logo of the railroad would invariably (except on the Milwaukee Road, see below) be hung from the tail end of the observation car. Some early trains offered two observation cars: a traditional enclosed type for its compartment or "first class" passengers and an open type resembling a flat car for its tourist class riders.

open observation cars

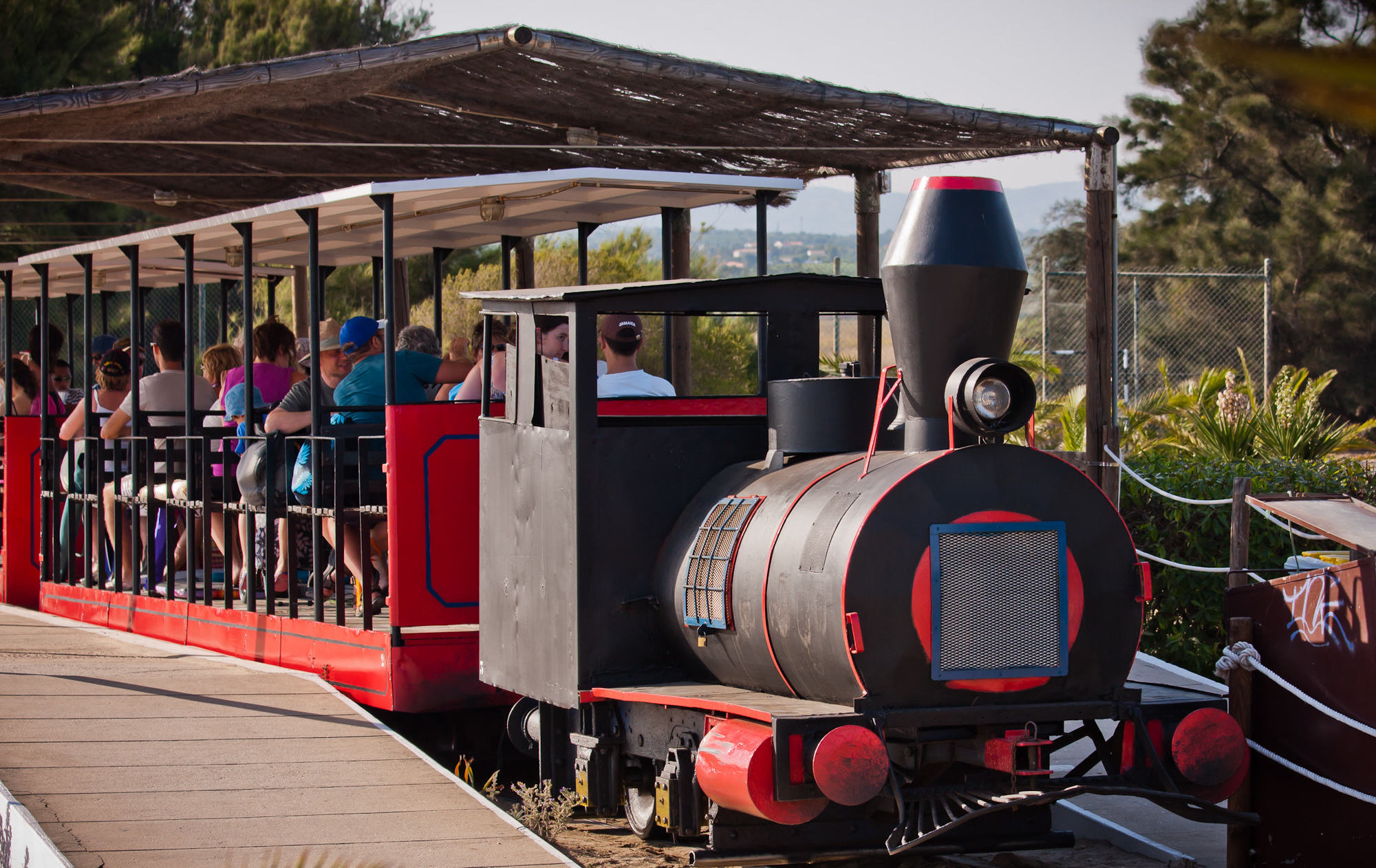
Beach train of the Comboio da Praia do Barril

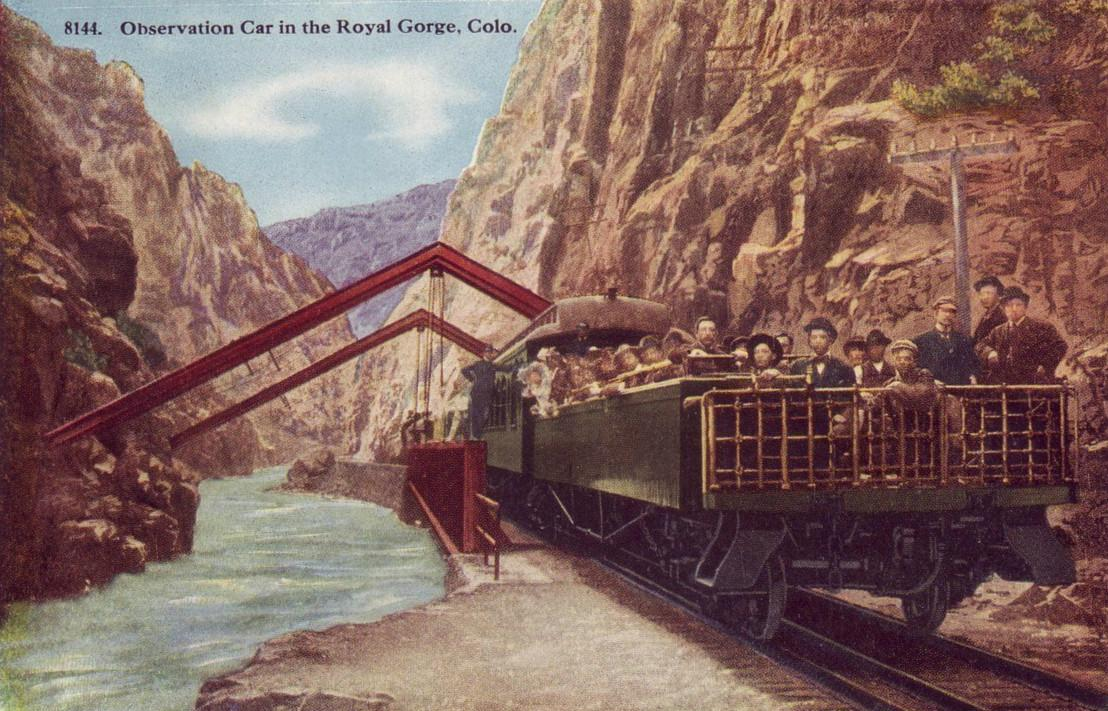
Open observation car at the Hanging Bridge of the Royal Gorge on the Denver and Rio Grande Western Railroad in 1918. The enclosed observation car is directly in front of it.

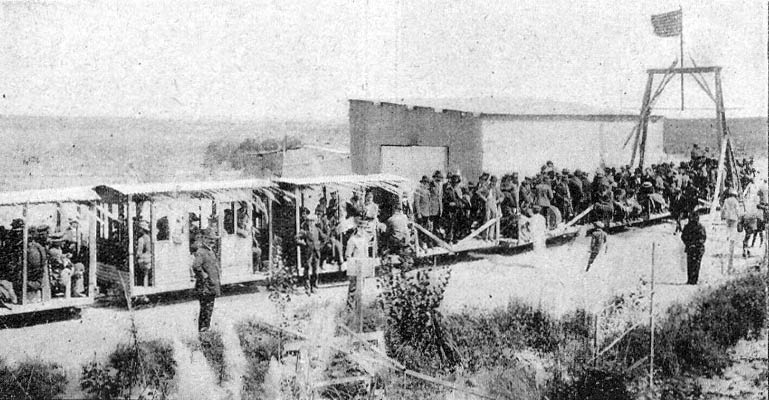
Tokio station, where passengers boarded the train to Ostende, Argentina (1913) observation car (Decauville wagon)

== History ==
When passenger trains were still the preferred mode of intercity transportation in America, observations often were used by those campaigning for public office, especially for the Presidency of the United States such as United States Railcar No. 1, the Ferdinand Magellan. On a whistle stop train tour the candidate's train would pull into town and stop with the observation end at the station, then the candidate would appear on the observation platform to deliver his "stump speech". The observation platform made a perfect temporary stage for just such an event. Like political candidates, famous personalities such as members of a royal family or film stars would use the open observation car end as a stage from which they would greet well-wishers and fans during public tours.

In more recent years, presidents Jimmy Carter, George H. W. Bush, Bill Clinton, and Barack Obama have used a heavyweight observation car built by the Pullman Standard Company in 1930. This car is the Georgia 300.

== Industrial design ==
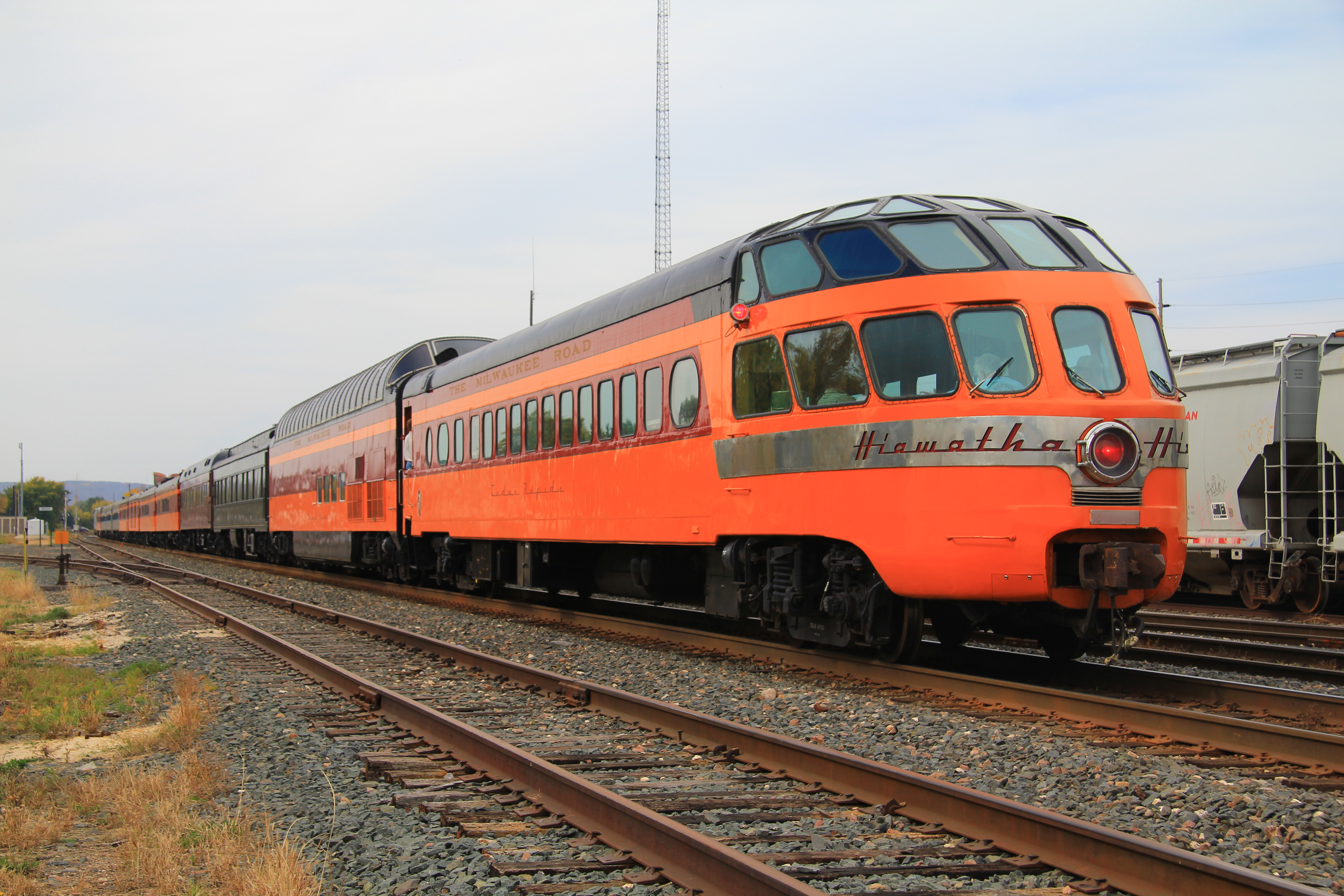
One of the Milwaukee Road's Skytop Lounge cars brings up the rear of a steam excursion behind Milwaukee Road 261.

While the cars manufactured by companies such as Pullman-Standard conformed to somewhat standard designs, some railroads created their own distinctive designs for observation ends. For example, the Milwaukee Road's passenger trains were often rounded out with either a "Skytop Lounge" or a finned "Beavertail observation" the latter due to noted industrial designer Otto Kuhler. The Milwaukee's observations were easily recognizable as the observation end of the cars were not only rounded, but also slanted toward the front of the car, often with windows extending up from the normal window height to the roofline. The Milwaukee's observations, including the Skytops, lacked a drumhead, whose place was taken by a large oscillating rear light; instead, each tapered side carried the generic Milwaukee script name "Hiawatha" embossed on stainless steel trim flanking this light. The Milwaukee's Skytops—four parlor cars built in the railroad's own shops and six sleepers built by Pullman-Standard—were designed by noted industrial designer Brooks Stevens. Six railroads bought dome-observation cars from Budd — the Chicago, Burlington and Quincy Railroad, the Denver and Rio Grande Western Railroad, and the Western Pacific Railroad for use on their joint California Zephyr, and the Canadian Pacific Railway for The Canadian and The Dominion. The WP touted this combination car type as "the best of both worlds" in passenger amenities. Budd also built observation cars for the Wabash Railroad for their Blue Bird trains between Chicago and St. Louis, and for the Chesapeake and Ohio Railway for the Chessie which never went into service. The C&O cars were sold to the Denver & Rio Grande and ran on the Royal Gorge.

== Modern use ==
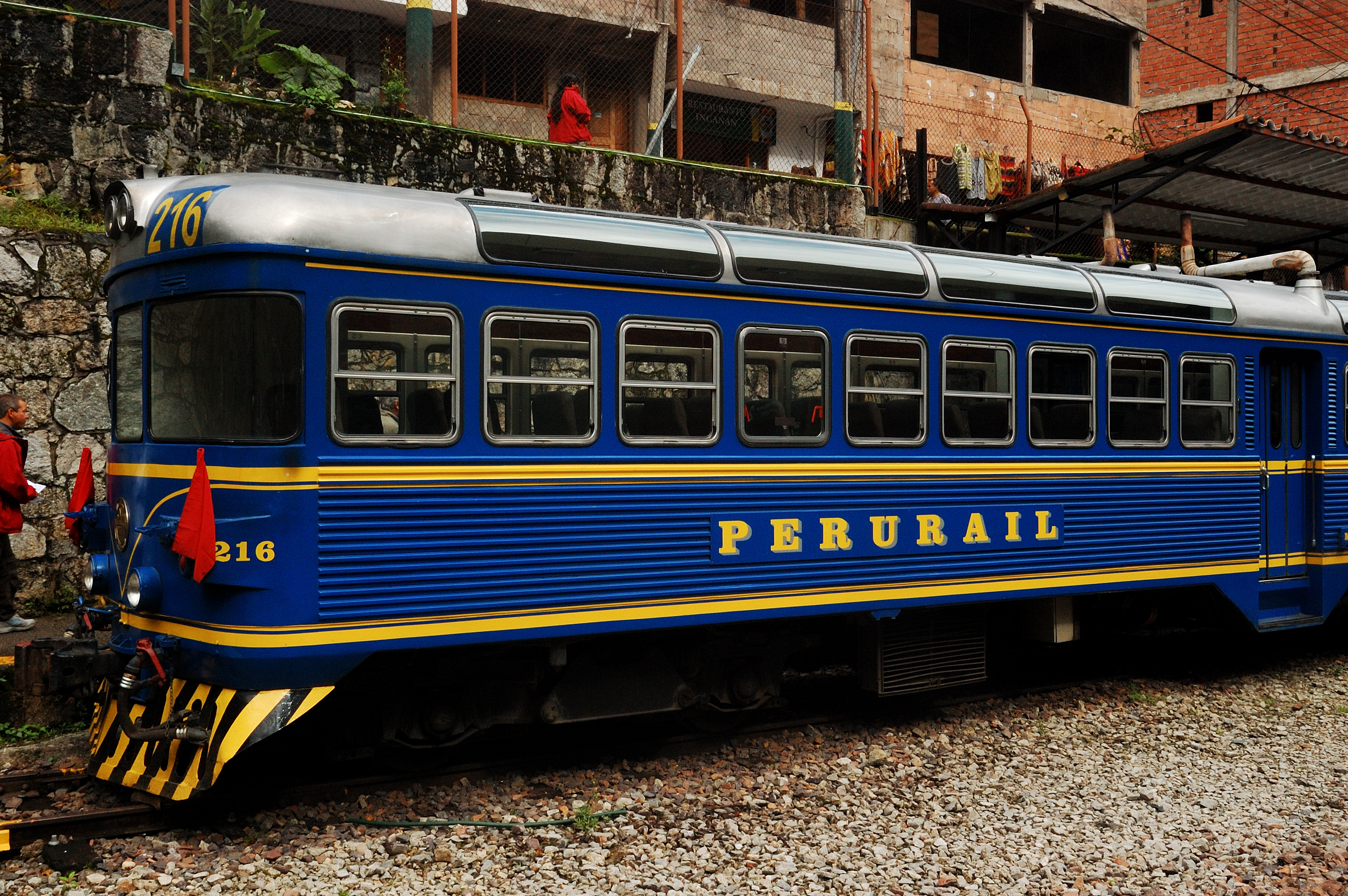
PeruRail observation railcar

As described above, the observation car on scheduled passenger trains has largely fallen victim to increased operational costs. An outstanding exception is Via Rail's Canadian, which still operates on every triweekly trip between Toronto and Vancouver with the same dome observation-lounge cars in use on the train since 1955.

On several long distance Amtrak routes outside the Northeast Corridor where most trains are equipped with Superliner cars, there are Sightseer Lounge cars. These combine extra window exposure on an upper observation level with a lounge area and cafe on lower levels of the trains, though are generally placed mid-way through the train's consist.

Some modern European trains, typically operating in the push-pull mode, are fitted with observation cars on one or both ends. The driver is located in a cabin on the side of the passengers, or above them like in the Swiss GoldenPass. The German ICE control cars feature a see-through driver cabin, with passenger seats behind the driver. In Italy the Settebello, in service between 1952 and 1992, and the Arlecchino also had the operator's cabs located above the lounge compartments at both ends of the train.

== See also ==
- Dome car
- Panorama Car
- Private railroad car
- Skytop Lounge
- Starlight Express, a musical about railway locomotives and carriages where Pearl the Observation Car is a character. Her costume is made to resemble that of a Pullman Observation coach.

== Bibliography ==
- White, John H. (1985) [1978]. The American Railroad Passenger Car. Baltimore, Maryland: Johns Hopkins University Press. ISBN 978-0-8018-2743-3.
