= Great Dome (railcar) =

Fleet of full-length dome cars

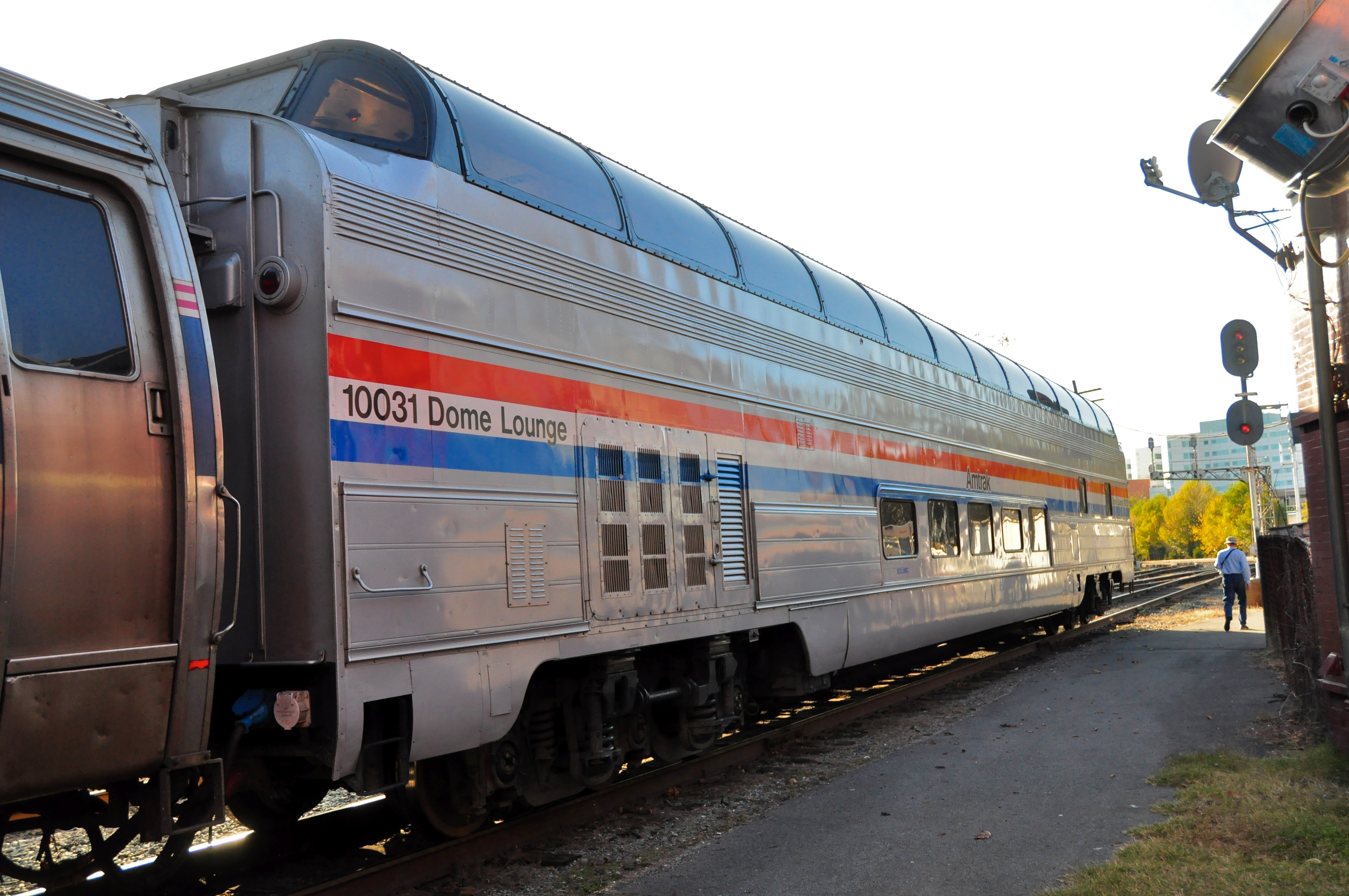
- Ocean View in Amtrak service on the Cardinal in 2011

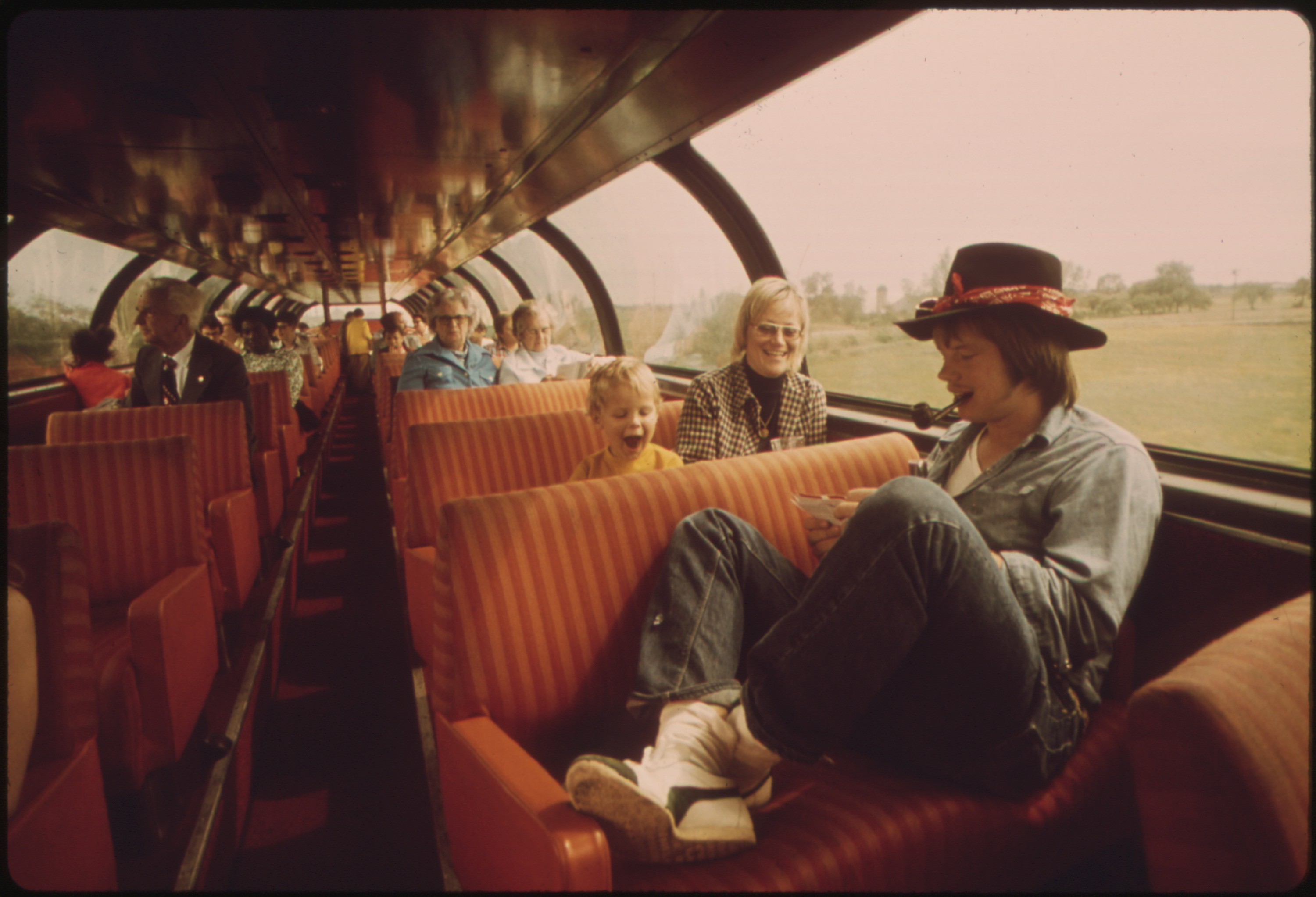
- The top level of a Great Dome on the Empire Builder in 1974
- Manufacturer: Budd Company
- Constructed: 1953–55
- Entered service: 1955
- Number built: 6
- Capacity: 57 coach + 18 lounge (dome level)
- Operators: Great Northern Railway; Chicago, Burlington and Quincy Railroad; Burlington Northern Railroad; Amtrak

The Great Domes were a fleet of six streamlined dome lounge cars built by the Budd Company for the Great Northern Railway and Chicago, Burlington and Quincy Railroad in 1955. The cars were used exclusively on the Empire Builder from their introduction in 1955 until the end of private passenger service in 1971. Amtrak retained all six cars and they continued to run on the Empire Builder before new Superliners displaced them at the end of the decade, after which they saw service elsewhere in the system before the last one being retired in 2019. The Great Domes were similar in design to the Big Domes Budd built for the Atchison, Topeka and Santa Fe Railway.

== Design ==
The Great Domes were "virtually identical" to the Big Dome lounges Budd constructed for the Santa Fe in 1954, save for the fact that their smooth sides lacked the fluting of the Big Domes. The top level featured coach-style seating for 57, plus a lounge area which could seat an additional 18 on sofas and in booths. The lower level featured a cocktail lounge decorated with the art of the Haida people, who hailed from the Pacific Northwest.

Great Dome Cars
Road Number	Car Name
GN #1390	Glacier View
GN #1391	Ocean View
GN #1392	Mountain View
GN #1393	Lake View
GN #1394	Prairie View
CB&Q #1395	River View

== Service history ==
The Great Northern was slow to adopt dome cars for its passenger trains. Management thought that the cost of heating and cooling the dome interiors would be prohibitively expensive given the hot summers and cold winters along the Hi-Line. Further, they thought the Empire Builder, which had already been re-equipped twice in 1947 and 1951, could attract passengers without adding domes. News that the Northern Pacific Railway and Chicago, Milwaukee, St. Paul and Pacific Railroad (the "Milwaukee Road") were adding domes to their transcontinental trains changed the Great Northern's mind. In 1953 the Great Northern ordered six Great Domes and sixteen "short" domes, enough to add one Great Dome and three "short" domes to the regular consist of the Empire Builder. One of the six cars was owned by the Chicago, Burlington and Quincy Railroad (CB&Q).

Amtrak acquired all six Great Domes from the Burlington Northern Railroad, successor to the Great Northern and CB&Q, on its startup in 1971. The Great Domes remained on the Empire Builder until October 28, 1979, when they and other single-level cars were displaced by Superliners and Hi-Level cars. Amtrak rebuilt three of the cars for head end power (HEP) and they remained on the roster into the 1990s on the Auto Train. Amtrak retained one, Ocean View, as part of its business car fleet and for special use on regular routes, such as the Downeaster service during leaf peeping season. Ocean View was retired in 2019 by Amtrak, due to the age and expense of maintaining the Great Dome Car. It was sold to Paxrail in 2020, before being entering a lease to purchase with RAILEXCO in early 2021, before selling to RAILEXCO upon completion of the agreement. As of late September 2022, Ocean View was in service on the Western Maryland Scenic Railroad under lease from RAILEXCO until late 2022 where it was sold to Canadian National Railway.
