= Blue Bird (train) =

Train service in the United States

Blue Bird City of Decatur
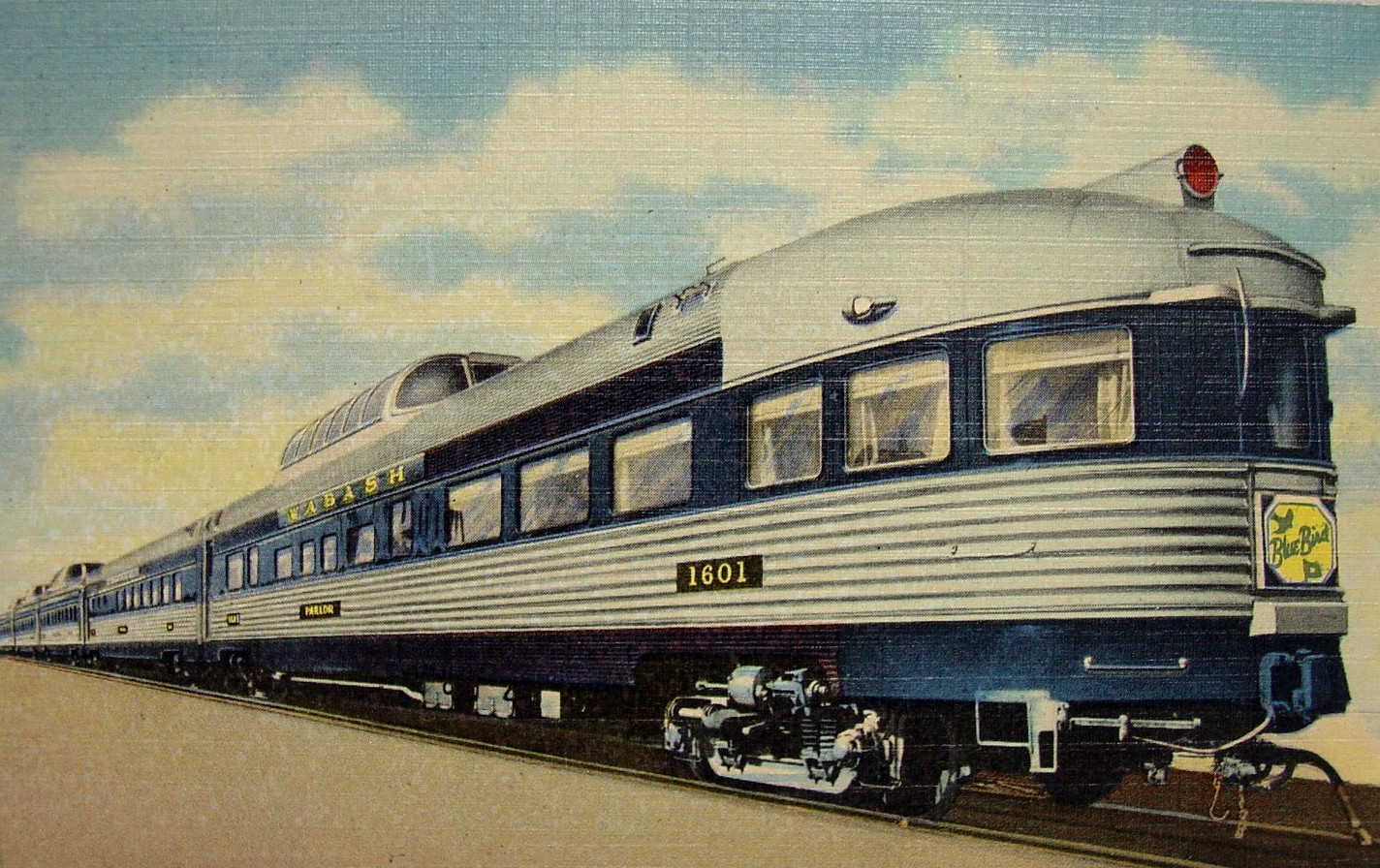
- The Blue Bird's "Vista-Dome" dome parlor-observation car in the 1950s.

Overview
- Service type: Inter-city rail
- Status: Discontinued
- Locale: Midwest United States
- First service: 1938
- Last service: April 30, 1971
- Former operators: Wabash Railroad; Norfolk and Western Railway

Route
- Termini: Chicago; St. Louis
- Distance travelled: 285.7 miles (459.8 km)
- Service frequency: Daily
- Train number: Southwestbound: 21; Northeast bound: 24

On-board services
- Seating arrangements: Reclining seat coaches
- Catering facilities: Dining car
- Observation facilities: dome parlor-lounge

The Blue Bird was a streamlined passenger train operated by the Wabash Railroad and its successor the Norfolk and Western Railway between Chicago, Illinois, and St. Louis, Missouri. It operated from 1938 to 1971. Beginning in 1950 it was one of the few Wabash passenger trains to carry a dome car and the first dome train in regular operation between the two cities. The train was cut back to Decatur, Illinois, in 1968 and renamed City of Decatur. Amtrak did not retain the City of Decatur, which made its last run on April 30, 1971.

== History ==
The Wabash introduced a heavyweight Blue Bird on the Chicago–St. Louis run in 1938. The train was painted blue-gold, previously reserved for the Wabash's Banner Blue.

The Wabash relaunched the Blue Bird as a streamlined train on February 26, 1950, with all-new Budd Company "Vista-Dome" dome cars and E-unit diesel locomotives from Electro-Motive Division. The new train carried Wabash's standard blue-gray-white livery. The Wabash referred to the Blue Bird as a "Domeliner" in contemporary advertising. Amenities on the new train included radio and "recorded musical programs"; coach passengers had access to the "Coffee Shop Club". The new equipment cost the Wabash US$1,500,000; it was the first dome train to operate between Chicago and St. Louis.

The Norfolk and Western Railway leased the Wabash in 1964 but continued to operate the Blue Bird. This changed in 1968 when the N&W truncated the Blue Bird to Decatur, Illinois, still departing from Chicago. This new service was named City of Decatur and operated until the formation of Amtrak in 1971.

== Route ==
The Blue Bird used the Wabash's line between Chicago and St. Louis. In March 1950 northbound #24 departed St. Louis' Union Station at 8:55 AM and arrived at Chicago's Dearborn Station at 2:05 PM. The equipment set returned as southbound #21 the same day, departing Chicago at 4:45 PM and arriving in St. Louis at 10:10 PM. Intermediate stops included Englewood in Chicago, Forrest, Decatur, Taylorville, Litchfield and Granite City in Illinois, and the Wabash's Delmar Boulevard station in St. Louis itself. At the time two other Wabash trains operated on the route: the Banner Blue, which operated a reverse schedule, and the overnight Midnight.

== Equipment ==
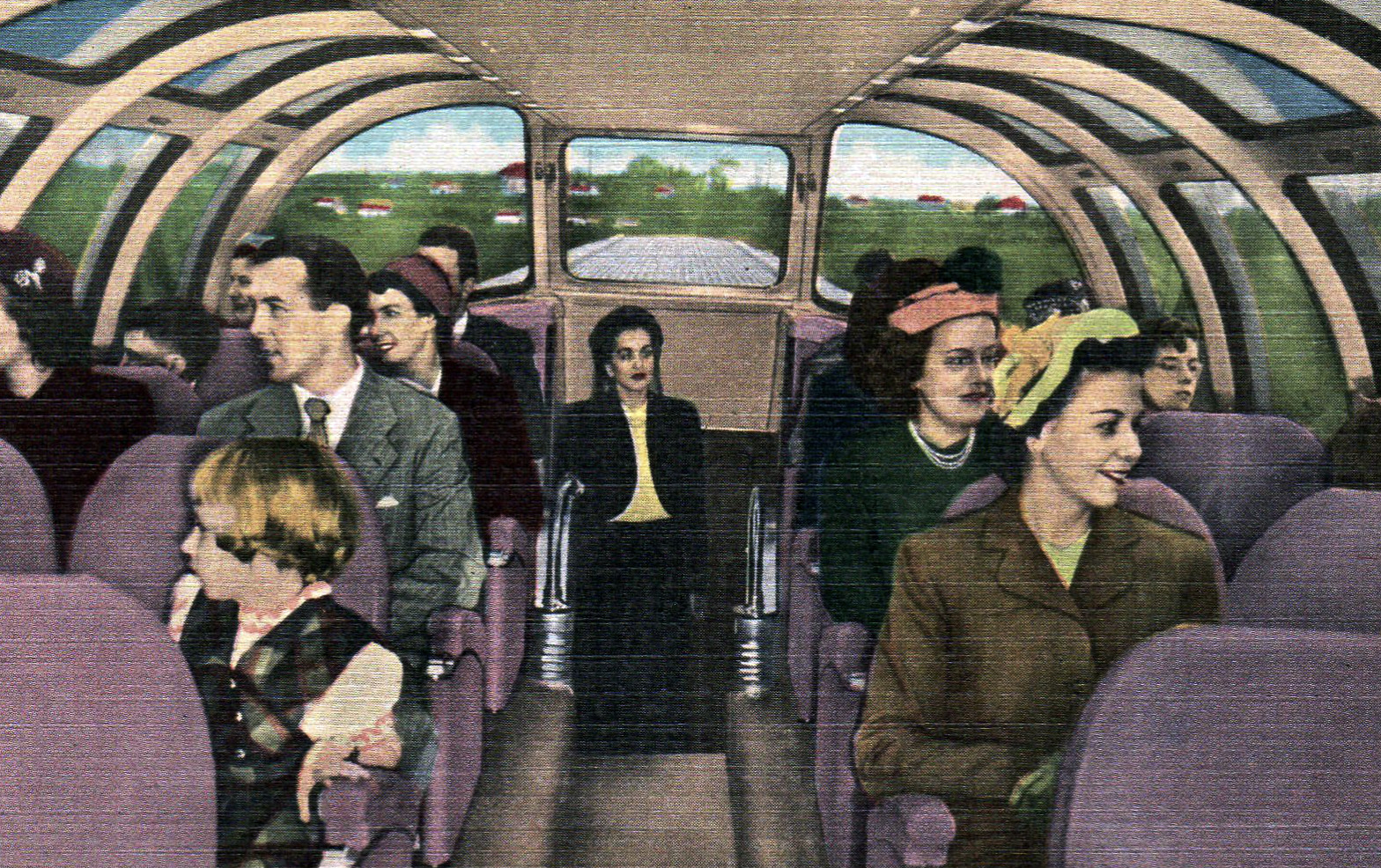
Interior of one of the "Vista-Dome" dome coaches on the Blue Bird.

The 1950 lightweight consist included six cars: a baggage-lunch counter-lounge, three "Vista-Dome" dome coaches, a dining car, and a "Vista-Dome" dome parlor-observation car. The Budd Company manufactured all six cars, although the interior of the parlor-observation car was designed according to Pullman Plan #9525. Strong demand led the Wabash to add another dome parlor-lounge in 1952. Pullman-Standard delivered the car, which included the "Blue Bird Room", an eleven-seat private dining room.
