= Union Pacific 4014 =

Preserved Union Pacific steam locomotive

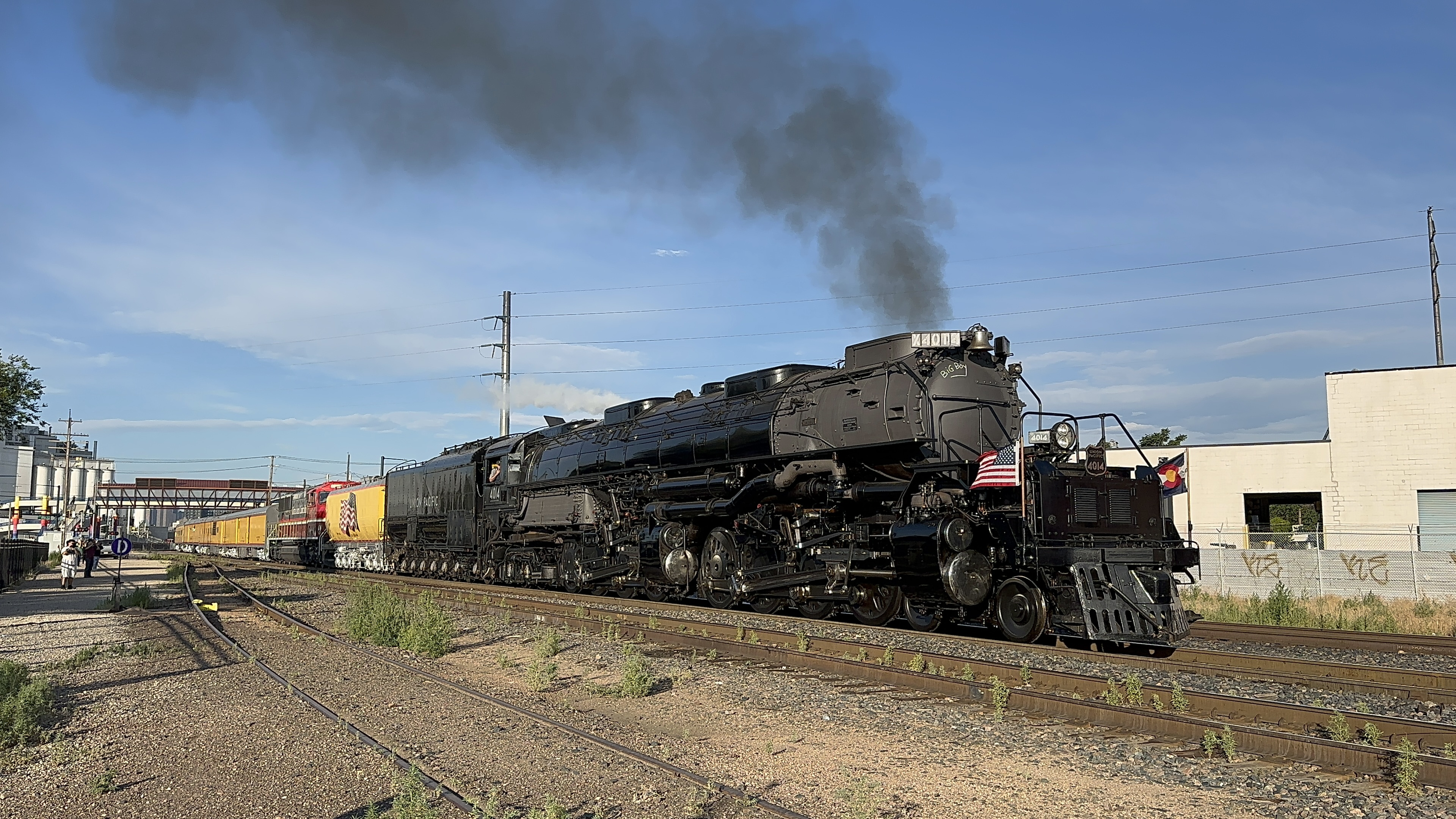
- Union Pacific No. 4014 departs Denver, Colorado, on July 19, 2025.
Type and origin
- Power type: Steam
- Designer: Otto Jabelmann
- Builder: American Locomotive Company (Schenectady Works)
- Serial number: 69585
- Build date: November 1941
Specifications
- Configuration
  - Whyte: 4-8-8-4
  - UIC: (2′D)D2′ h4
- Gauge: 4 ft 8 1/2 in (1,435 mm) standard gauge
- Leading dia.: 36 in (914 mm)
- Driver dia.: 68 in (1,727 mm)
- Trailing dia.: 42 in (1,067 mm)
- Minimum curve: 288 ft (88 m) radius/ 20°
- Wheelbase: Locomotive: 72 ft 5 1/2 in (22.09 m); Overall: 117 ft 7 in (35.84 m)
- Length: Locomotive: 85 ft 7.8 in (26.11 m); Overall: 132 ft 9 7/8 in (40.48 m)
- Width: 11 ft (3.35 m)
- Height: 16 ft 2 1/2 in (4.94 m)
- Axle load: 68,150 lb (30,912 kg)
- Adhesive weight: 545,200 lb (272.6 short tons)
- Loco weight: 772,250 lb (386.12 short tons)
- Tender weight: 446,000 lb (223 short tons)
- Total weight: 1,218,500 lb (609.2 short tons) and 1,477,000 lb (738 short tons) (Combine oil and water)
- Tender type: 25-C
- Fuel type: New: Coal; Now: No. 5 fuel oil
- Fuel capacity: Total: 6,500 US gal (25,000 L); Usable: 6,100 US gal (23,000 L)
- Water cap.: 25,000 US gal (95,000 L)
- Sandbox cap.: 8,000 lb (4 short tons)
- Fuel consumption: 20–25 US gal (76–95 L) of fuel oil per mile; 200 US gal (760 L) of water per mile
- Firebox
  - Grate area: 150 sq ft (grate removed in 2019)
- Boiler
  - Model: Fire Tube
  - Diameter: 107 in (2,718 mm)
  - Tube plates: 22 ft (7 m)
- Boiler pressure: 300 lbf/in^{2} (2.1 MPa)
- Feedwater heater: Elesco Type T.P. 502 Exhaust Steam Injector; 14,000 US gal / hour capacity
- Heating surface
  - Firebox: 704 sq ft (65 m^{2})
  - Tubes: 967 sq ft (90 m^{2})
  - Flues: 4,218 sq ft (392 m^{2})
  - Tubes and flues: 5,185 sq ft (482 m^{2})
  - Total surface: 5,889 sq ft (547 m^{2})
- Superheater
  - Type: Type E
  - Heating area: 2,466 sq ft (229 m^{2})
- Cylinders: Four, outside
- Cylinder size: 24 in × 32 in (610 mm × 813 mm)
- Valve gear: Walschaerts
- Valve type: Piston valves
- Valve travel: 7 in (178 mm)
- Valve lap: 1 3/8 in (35 mm)
- Valve lead: 1/4 in (6 mm)
- Train heating: Steam heat
- Loco brake: Pneumatic, Schedule 8-ET
- Train brakes: Pneumatic
- Safety systems: Cab signals, PTC
- Couplers: Knuckle
Performance figures
- Maximum speed: 40–60 mph (64–97 km/h) in regular service; 80 mph (130 km/h) (maximum design)
- Power output: 8,157 hp (6,083 kW) @ Cylinder; 6,290–7,000 hp (4,690–5,220 kW) @ Drawbar
- Tractive effort: 135,375 lbf (602.18 kN)
- Factor of adh.: 4.00
Career
- Operators: Union Pacific Railroad
- Class: 4884-1
- Number in class: 15
- Numbers: UP 4014
- Nicknames: Big Boy
- Locale: Western United States
- Delivered: December 1941
- First run: December 1941
- Last run: July 21, 1959
- Retired: December 7, 1961
- Restored: May 1, 2019
- Current owner: Union Pacific (Union Pacific Heritage Fleet)
- Disposition: Operational

Union Pacific 4014 is a preserved 4884-1 class 4-8-8-4 "Big Boy" type steam locomotive owned and operated by the Union Pacific (UP) as part of its heritage fleet. Built in 1941 by the American Locomotive Company (ALCO) in Schenectady, New York, it was assigned to haul heavy freight trains in the Wasatch mountain range. The locomotive was retired from revenue service in 1959, and it was donated to the Railway & Locomotive Historical Society in 1961. It was displayed in Fairplex at the RailGiants Train Museum in Pomona, California.

In 2013, UP re-acquired the locomotive and launched a restoration project at its Steam Shop in Cheyenne, Wyoming. In 2019, No. 4014 moved under its own power after sitting dormant for almost six decades, becoming the world's largest operational steam locomotive and the only operating Big Boy locomotive of the eight that remain in existence. In 2021, No. 4014 became the first mainline steam locomotive to be equipped with the positive train control system. It now operates in excursion service for the UP steam program, including a coast-to-coast tour in 2026.

== History ==
=== Design ===
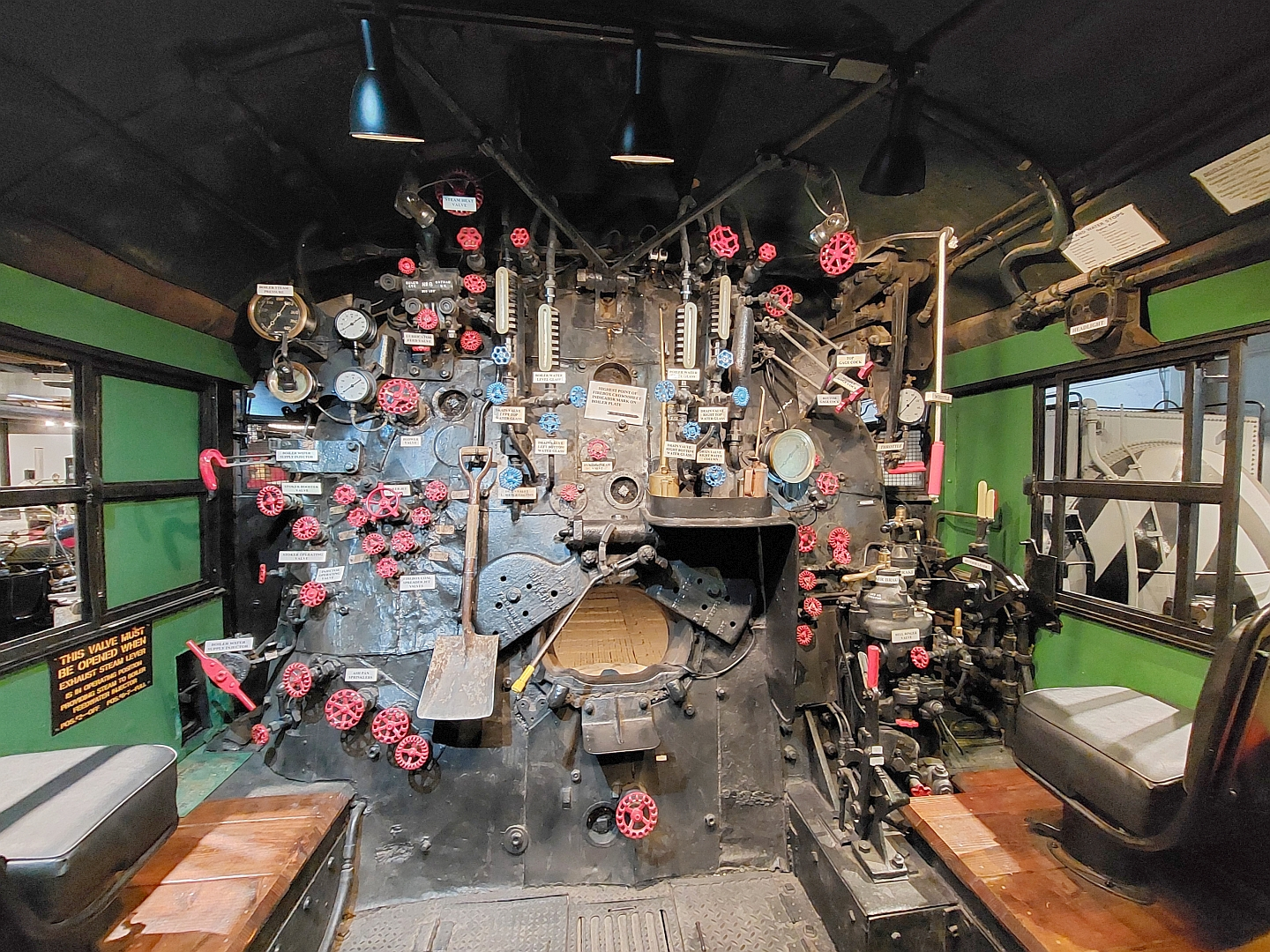
This photo of No. 4005's backhead shows what No. 4014 looked like before it was converted to burn oil.

The Big Boy class was developed by Union Pacific (UP) and built by the American Locomotive Company in the 1940s to handle the 1.14% eastbound ruling grade of Utah's Wasatch Range unassisted. Under the instruction of UP president William M. Jeffers, a team led by UP's chief mechanical officer Otto Jabelmann adapted the design of the 4-6-6-4 Challenger, enlarging the firebox to about 235 by 96 inches (5.97 m × 2.44 m) (about 155 sq ft or 14.4 m^{2}), lengthening the boiler, adding four driving wheels, and reducing the diameter of the driving wheels from 69 to 68 in (1,753 to 1,727 mm). Originally, the 4-8-8-4 class was rumored to be called Wasatch, after the Wasatch Mountains, but acquired the Big Boy nickname after an unknown ALCO worker scrawled it in chalk on the smokebox door of No. 4000, the first of its class.

The Big Boy was articulated like the Mallet locomotive design, although without compounding. It was designed for stability at 80 miles per hour (130 km/h), allowing for a wide margin of reliability and safety, as steam locomotives normally operated well below that speed in freight service. Peak power was reached around 35 mph (56 km/h); optimal tractive effort was maintained up to around 10 mph (16 km/h). It is longer than two city buses and weighs more than a Boeing 747. The locomotives were equipped with a Hancock long-bell 3-chime "steamboat" whistle.

=== Revenue service ===
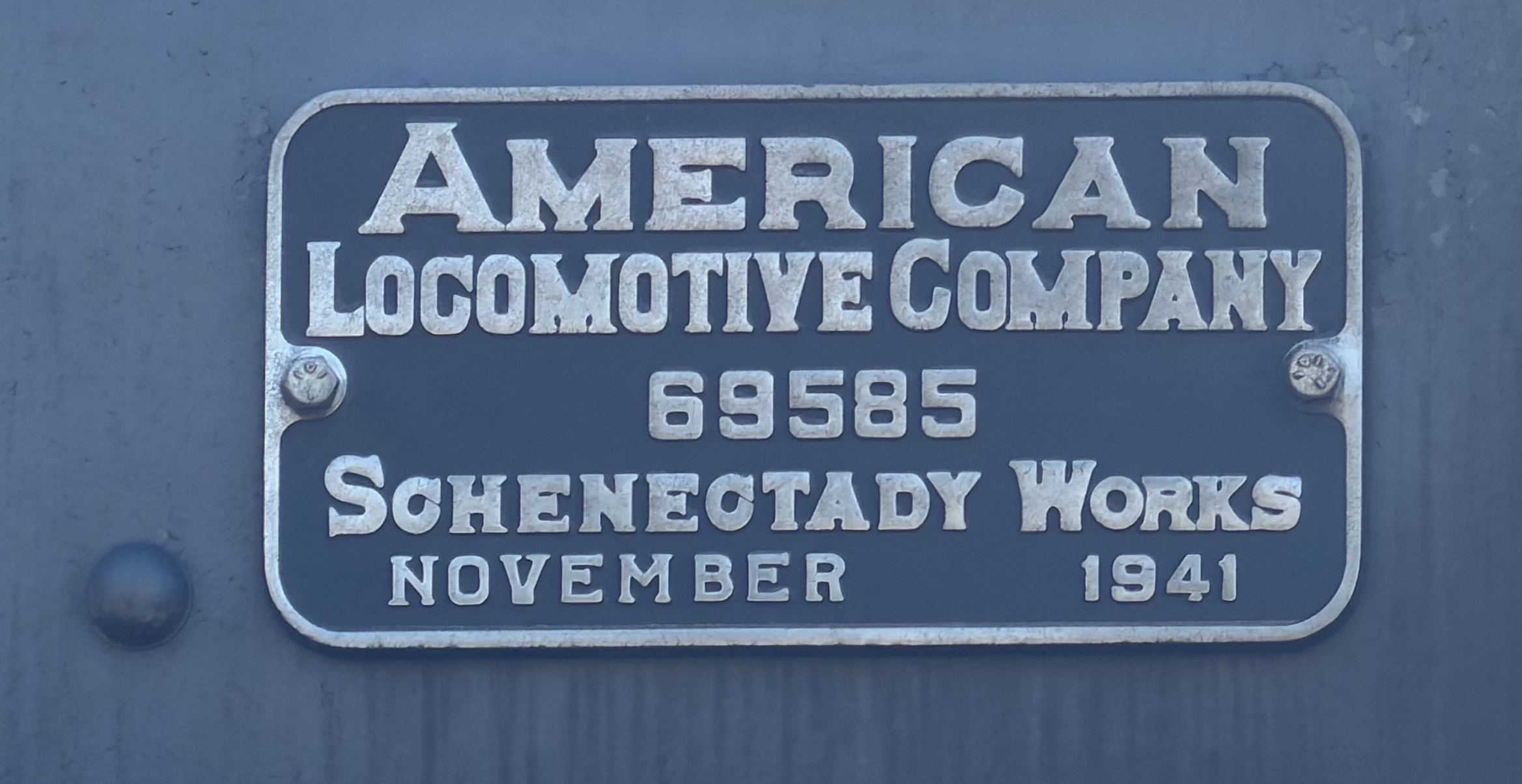
No. 4014's replica builder's plate

ALCO built No. 4014 as part of the first group of 20 Big Boys, called 4884–1. The locomotive was completed in November 1941 at a cost of $265,174 ($5,804,000 in 2025) and delivered to UP a month later. In revenue service, the Big Boys were initially assigned to haul freight trains between their home bases of Ogden, Utah, and Green River, Wyoming, allowing the Challengers to be reassigned to wartime traffic east of Green River towards Cheyenne, Wyoming. (Note: UP reduced the use of 4-12-2 9000 class as helper engines on the Wyoming Division; they were reassigned to the Nebraska Division, where they displaced 2-10-2 TTT locomotives, which were reassigned to other divisions, some as helpers, and displaced the 2-8-2s.) They proved better than expected: designed to haul 3,600-short-ton (3,214-long-ton; 3,266 t) freight trains over the Wasatch Range, they routinely hauled up to 4,200 short tons (3,750 long tons; 3,810 t). During a test on April 2, 1943, No. 4014 pulled 65 freight cars between Ogden and Evanston, Wyoming, generating a maximum of 5,530 hp (4,120 kW) against a three-unit diesel. (Note: Designer Jabelmann had died four months earlier, during his visit to England.)

Around 1944, wartime traffic was at its peak and the 4884–1 group were due for heavy shopping. UP ordered five more Big Boys, Nos. 4020-4024, which were classified as 4884-2 and built at a cost of $319,600 each. (Note: Despite being identical to the previous batch, the 4884-2s' boilers and rods were made out of heavier metal, making them slightly heavier.) At this point, the Big Boys operated from Green River towards Rawlins, Laramie, and Cheyenne. Around 1948, all of them were based in Cheyenne for revenue runs to Green River; Denver, Colorado; and occasionally Ogden. By 1950, the Big Boys occasionally worked east towards North Platte, Nebraska, from Cheyenne.

No. 4014's last routine repairs took place in 1956. During the work, the locomotive's original tender, 25-C-115, was swapped with No. 4015's 25-C-116. No. 4014 also received a driving rod bearing part from No. 4002. On July 20, 1959, No. 4014 left on its final revenue run, departing Laramie at 10:15 p.m. and arriving in Cheyenne the next day at 1:50 a.m. (Note: A few hours later, fellow locomotive No. 4015 arrived, becoming the last Big Boy to run in revenue service.) It had traveled 1,031,205 miles (1,659,564 km) during its revenue service. (Note: Big Boy No. 4006 traveled the most: 1,064,625 miles (1,713,348 km).) Afterwards, the Big Boys were stored in operational condition in Wyoming: No. 4014 and most of the Big Boys in Cheyenne, four in Green River. The Big Boys' duties were taken over by EMD GP9 diesels and gas turbine-electric locomotives (GTELs); 17 of them were retired from the operating roster and cut up for scrap in 1961 and 1962.

=== Preservation ===
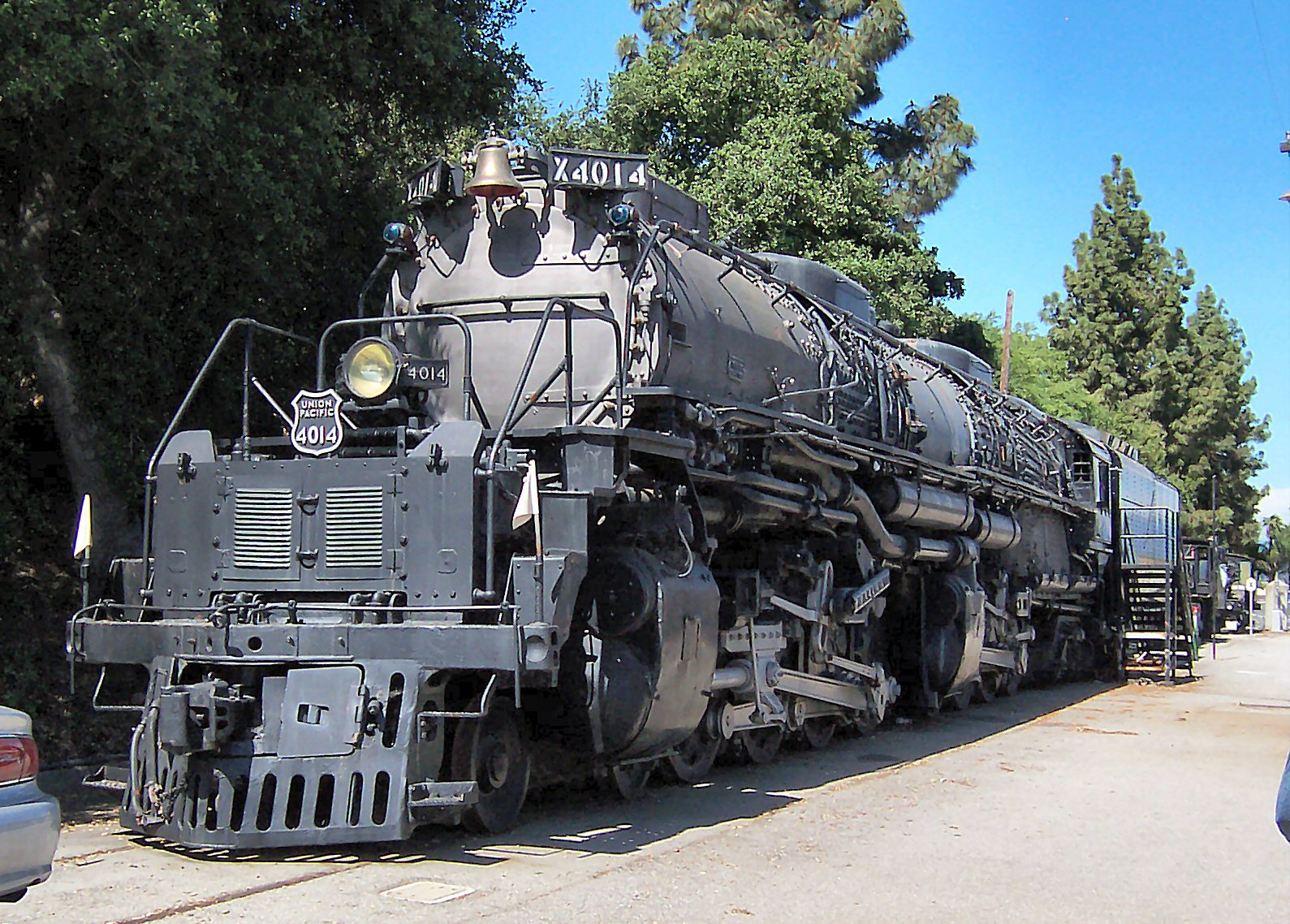
No. 4014 on display at the RailGiants Train Museum, April 2005

Eight of the popular locomotives were salvaged for preservation. Among them was No. 4014, which UP agreed to donate to fulfill an October 18, 1961, request from the Southern California Chapter of the Railway & Locomotive Historical Society (R&LHS) in Pomona, California. Its builder's plates had been stolen, so the locomotive was fitted with two replicas of No. 4001's plates with the serial number 69572 and the September 1941 build date. On December 7, No. 4014 was retired from the operating roster. It left for Pomona on December 29 and was transported by freight train with brief stops in Las Vegas, Nevada, and Yermo, California. On January 8, 1962, the locomotive arrived in Pomona, where Pacific Electric moved it into the Los Angeles County Fairgrounds (LACF) in the Fairplex area.

UP's last new passenger steam locomotive, FEF-3 4-8-4 No. 844, had operated in excursion service since 1960, making UP the only Class I railroad in America still running steam locomotives. In 1981, UP's steam program added Challenger No. 3985, which along with No. 844, would be the program's marquee locomotive for more than three decades. In 1989, when the Southern California Chapter of the R&LHS moved their RailGiants museum within the fairgrounds, No. 4014 was pushed and pulled across the parking lot.

As the years passed, some speculated that one of the eight preserved Big Boys could be restored to operational condition. A year after No. 3985 was removed from service in 2010, a West Coast businessman proposed to fund a multi-million dollar UP effort to restore a Big Boy. This proposal was accepted by Ed Dickens, the senior manager of UP's heritage fleet operations. (Note: Dickens operated narrow-gauge steam locomotives on the Durango and Silverton Narrow Gauge Railroad and Georgetown Loop Railroad in Southwest Colorado until 1993, when he was hired by the Southern Pacific Railroad (SP) to run diesels. After SP merged with UP in 1996, Dickens returned to operating steam locomotives, for UP's heritage fleet. In 2010, he was named senior manager of heritage operations.)

=== Ownership transfer and restoration ===
"No other railroad has retained its historical equipment or honored its American roots like Union Pacific. Our steam locomotive program is a source of great pride to UP employees past and present. We are very excited about the opportunity to bring history to life by restoring No. 4014."

— Ed Dickens, Senior Manager of Union Pacific Heritage Operations, in 2013

In late 2012, UP officials announced that they might restore a Big Boy locomotive. The Southern California Chapter of the R&LHS said they had conducted preliminary discussions with the railroad about returning No. 4014, whose boiler barrel was in excellent mechanical condition and whose display in temperate Southern California had limited rust and other deterioration. On July 23, 2013, UP officials announced that the deal was done. No. 4014's journey to the UP Steam Shop in Cheyenne began on November 14, when Dickens and his team, along with lead journeyman machinist Austin Barker, used a front-end loader to tow the locomotive from its display site at the Fairplex onto a short section of temporary track. (Note: One of the volunteers, Ed Gerlits, died from illness on December 17, 2013.) It took nearly a month to pull the locomotive across a mile of the LACF parking lot and National Hot Rod Association property, repositioning 40-foot sections of temporary track in leapfrog fashion, to reach a UP holding track near Arrow Highway and White Avenue.

On January 26, 2014, No. 4014 was pulled onto Metrolink trackage and into Covina station by No. 1996, an SD70ACe diesel locomotive painted in Southern Pacific colors. It presently arrived at UP's West Colton Yard in Bloomington, California, for further repairs. (Note: On February 22, 2014, UP EMD SD40-2C No. 3105 (née Missouri Pacific No. 6027), UP insulated boxcar No. 453665, and bay window caboose UP No. 24567 (née Rock Island No. 17149) took No. 4014's place in the museum.) On April 28, it began its journey to Cheyenne behind an SD70M that shared the same number as the Big Boy. (Note: On April 10, 2019, the diesel locomotive numbered 4014 was redesignated as 4479 on the UP active locomotive roster, allowing the "Big Boy" to retain the number.) Another SD70M, No. 4884, was behind the Big Boy to help brake when descending the hill. Its number was also a nod to the Big Boy's wheel arrangement. On May 8, No. 4014 arrived at the Steam Shop's roundhouse. It sat largely idle for two years while the UP Steam Team crew worked to overhaul No. 844 and to expand and upgrade its facilities to accommodate the Big Boy.

In July 2016, after No. 844's repairs and inspection were complete, the restoration work of No. 4014 began under Dickens' supervision. The UP Steam Team used No. 844 to move the Big Boy onto the turntable, and turned it to face west. They separated the locomotive from its tender and moved it into the main Steam Shop. They began a through boiler inspection: removing the tubes, flues, and superheaters, testing all of the bolts and rivet, checking the metallurgy, inspecting the seams of the boiler courses, and performing an ultrasonic test to determine the thickness of the boiler shell and firebox walls. In December 2016, the Steam Team hired a derailment-cleanup company to use two heavy-duty cranes to lift No. 4014's boiler, allowing the two sets of articulated frames to be separated from the rest of the locomotive.

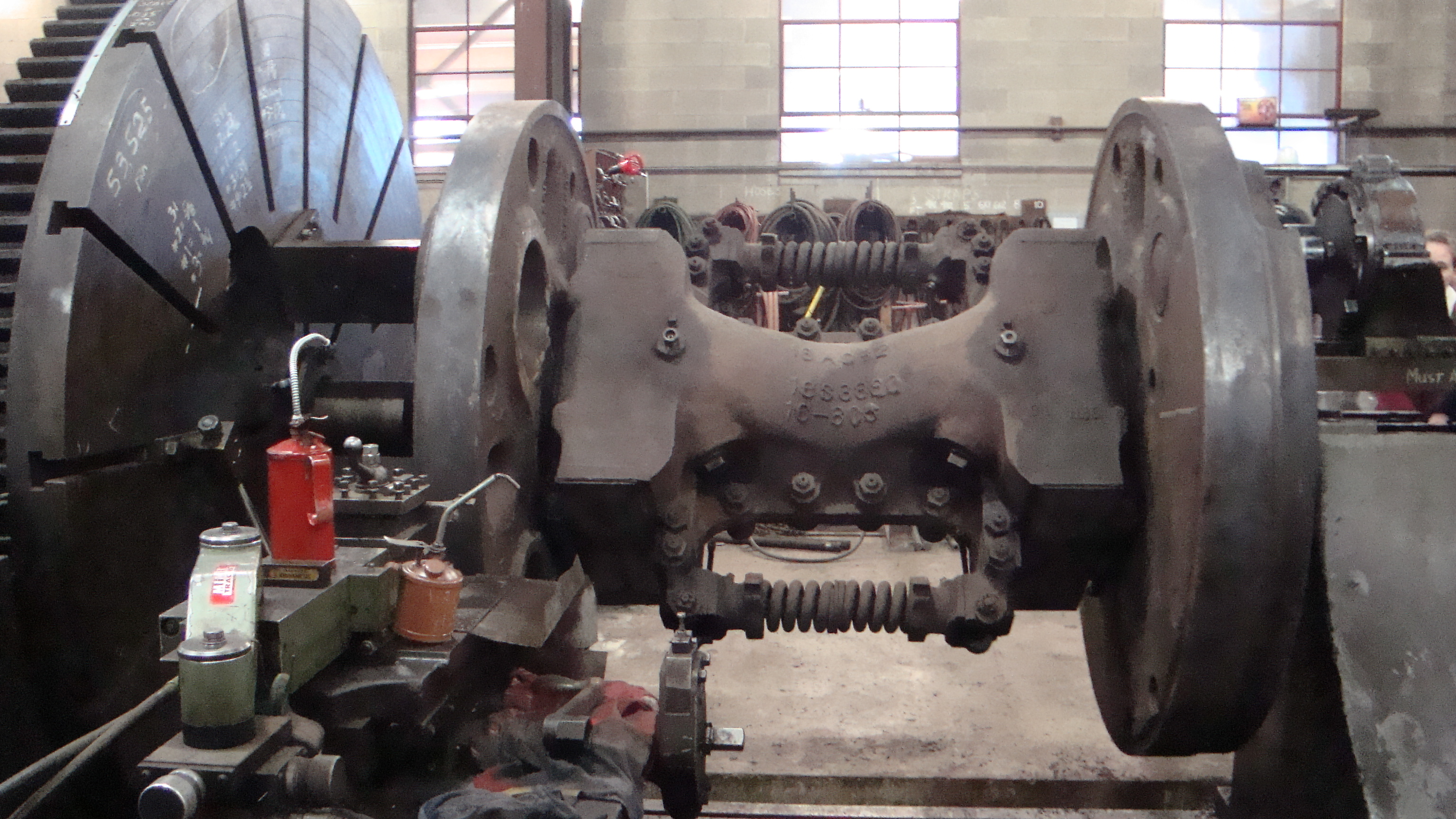
One of No. 4014's driving wheels on the lathe at the Strasburg Rail Road workshop in 2017

By early 2017, the Big Boy had been completely disassembled. Some new parts were fabricated, including the rod brasses, top boiler check valve, and lubricator check valves. The leading wheels, driving wheels, and trailing wheels were sent to the Strasburg Rail Road in Strasburg, Pennsylvania, for repairs and upgrades. The drivers were given new tires, while the roller bearings on the axles of the leading and trailing wheels were replaced. The axles, crankpins, and eccentric cranks, which were part of the driving gear made to transmit the wheels' movement, were also replaced. The two cross-compound air pumps were rebuilt by the Back Shop Enterprises in Wheat Ridge, Colorado. Barker, who had become the general foreman of UP's heritage fleet operations in 2015, used a computer-aided design (CAD) program to analyze how No. 4014's mechanical parts move and interact with adjacent components.

The restoration work included one major alteration: converting the coal-burning locomotive to run on No. 5 fuel oil by replacing the firebox grates with a fire pan and an oil burner. The data lettering on the sides of No. 4014's cab was changed from "MB", denoting an MB-type mechanical stoker, to "DB", for Dickens/Barker, crediting Dickens and Barker for converting the locomotive to run on oil. No. 4014 was the first Big Boy to undergo a coal-to-oil conversion since No. 4005, which ran on oil from 1946 until it was reconverted to coal in 1948 due to uneven heating in its large, single-burner firebox. To meet the restoration deadline, No. 4014 was mated with tender No. 25-C-311, which originally belonged to No. 3985. No. 4014's old firebox grates were salvaged and used on the Milwaukee Road 261 steam locomotive. (Note: In 2021, it was proposed to convert No. 261 to burn oil, depending on a feasibility study and cost-benefit analysis.)

In March 2018, it was reported that No. 4014 was being reassembled; In June 2018, all of the wheels returned from Strasburg. By December 2018, the locomotive's restoration was nearly finished. The locomotive was moved outside to be reunited with its newly rebuilt articulated frames. On February 6, 2019, No. 4014's boiler passed a hydrostatic test and the locomotive was successfully test-fired on April 9. Around 9 p.m. on May 1, 2019, No. 4014 moved under its own power for the first time in almost 60 years. The next evening, the locomotive made its first test run, from Cheyenne to Nunn, Colorado. One estimate put the cost of restoration at $4 million or more.

=== Positive train control ===
In December 2018, Union Pacific asked the Federal Railroad Administration (FRA) to exempt UP Nos. 4014, 3985, and 844 from federal positive train control (PTC) requirements; three months later, the FRA officials responded that such waivers were not needed.

In 2021, UP would equip No. 4014 with PTC anyway, making it the first mainline steam locomotive to be so equipped. Initially, its PTC display was powered by computers and equipment in its helper diesel locomotive, UP SD70M No. 4015. (Note: As of 2026, No. 4015 was painted as the 1616 Abraham Lincoln commemorative locomotive.) In May 2024, PTC equipment was installed in a cabinet in the tender, and a third dynamo added to the locomotive to provide electrical power, allowing No. 4014 to run without a diesel helper.

=== Excursion service ===
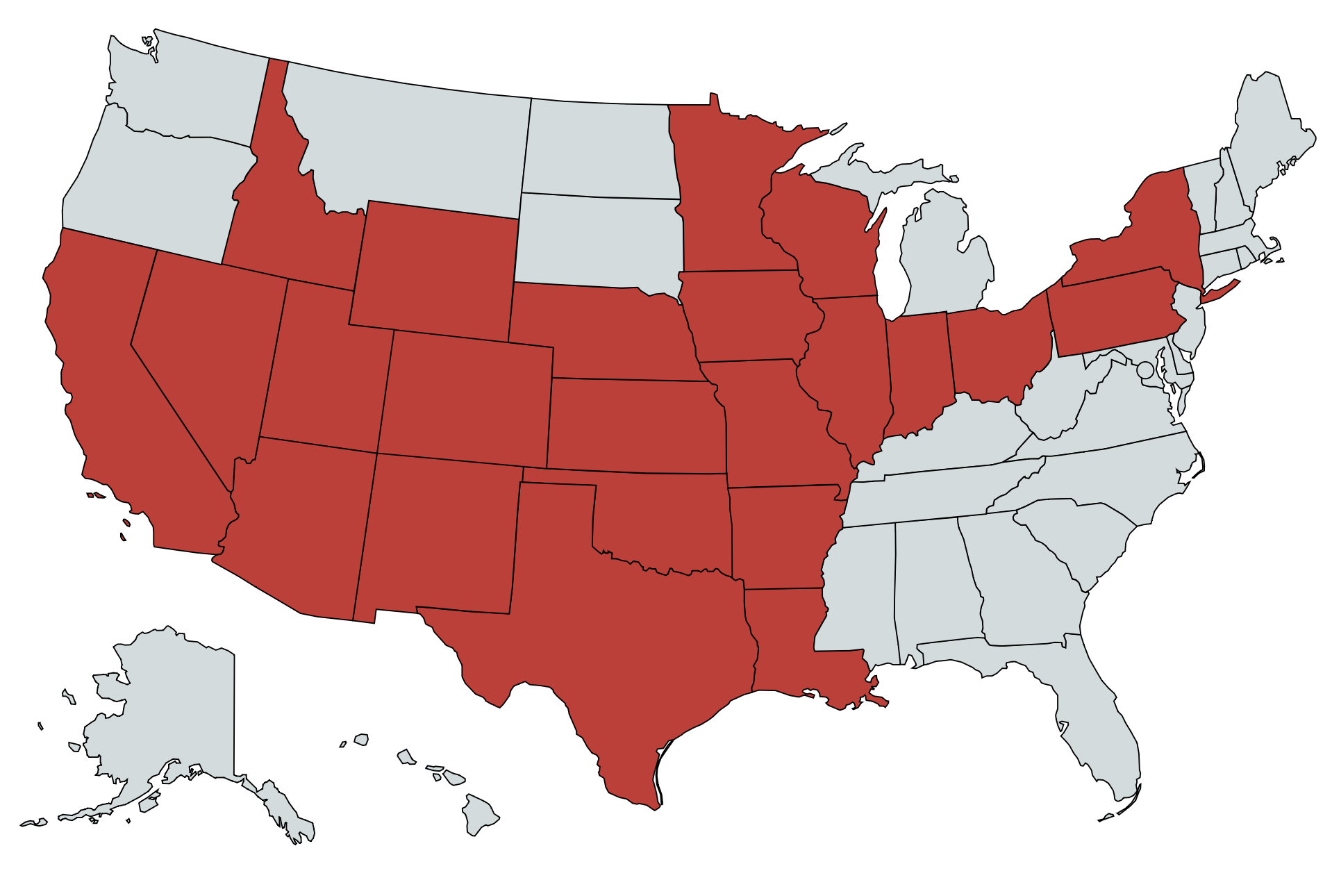
US states visited by No. 4014 in excursion service

Once restored, No. 4014 joined No. 844 in excursion service. It also became the world's largest operational steam locomotive, displacing No. 3985. Dickens, who had led the restoration project, became No. 4014's regular engineer, while Barker became its expert fireman. In May 2019, No. 4014 made its first excursion run amid the celebrations marking 150 years since the completion of the first transcontinental railroad. After its May 4 christening at the Cheyenne Depot Museum, No. 4014 — doubleheaded with No. 844 — traveled to Ogden, Utah. Afterwards, No. 4014 received replicas of its own builder's plates, nearly six decades after the originals were stolen. No. 4014 subsequently made two tours on its own. From July 8 to August 8, it visited the Midwestern United States, including brief stops at Saint Paul Union Depot and the Lake Superior Railroad Museum; it then toured the Southwestern United States from September 27 to November 26.

In January 2020, Union Pacific officials announced that the UP Steam Team would retire No. 3985, which was in poor mechanical condition. Two months later, UP suspended steam operations because of the COVID-19 pandemic. Excursion operations resumed in August and September 2021 with No. 4014 doing tour stops in Fort Worth and Houston, Texas; New Orleans, Louisiana; North Little Rock, Arkansas; St. Louis, Missouri; and Denver, Colorado.

No. 4014 hauls an excursion near Ralston, Iowa, on July 15, 2019.

In May 2022, one month after No. 3985 was donated to the Railroading Heritage of Midwest America (RRHMA) in Silvis, Illinois, the museum announced a plan to convert No. 4014's No. 25-C-116 tender to carry fuel oil instead of coal. This would enable the Big Boy to use its original tender, allowing tender No. 25-C-311 to be reunited with No. 3985. In late July 2022, No. 4014 pulled the Museum Special excursion between Cheyenne and the Denver Union Station to benefit the Union Pacific Railroad Museum. (Note: UP originally announced on April 11, 2022, that No. 4014 would tour the Northwestern United States, starting on June 26 in commemoration of UP's 160th anniversary, but the tour was canceled on April 22 so UP could reduce supply chain congestion.) On September 14, 2022, No. 4014 was fired up to move Union Pacific 5511 from the Cheyenne roundhouse and around the yard for testing before the 2-10-2 locomotive left for the RRHMA two months later.

In June 2023, No. 4014 ran from Cheyenne to Omaha, Nebraska, with the Home Run Express Tour, for display at Charles Schwab Field Omaha on June 15–21 and 24–25. During the return journey to Cheyenne on June 29, No. 4014 banked a stalled freight train up the grade in Blair, Nebraska. Two cab rides on the July 3 journey from Pine Bluffs, Wyoming, to Cheyenne were sold for $9,500 apiece to benefit the Union Pacific Railroad Museum. (Note: UP's original plan was to auction off one cab ride. But on June 23, UP informed its Steam Club members that the auction "was manipulated by an individual and did not result in an award to the highest bidder" and that as a result, the museum would sell two tickets, priced at $9,500 each, at 5 p.m. CDT on its website.)

Two tours were finalized in 2024. The first ran from June 30 to July 26, with stops at the Western Pacific Railroad Museum in Portola, California, on July 10; Roseville, California, on July 12 and 13; and Ogden on July 20 and 21. The second tour ran from August 28 to October 23 with stops in Texas, Arkansas, Kansas, and Illinois. On the second tour's journey through Iowa in September, American comedian and former The Tonight Show host Jay Leno hitched a ride on No. 4014 to film the episode for his YouTube web series Jay Leno's Garage. On July 17–19, 2025, No. 4014 made two whistle stops at Greeley, Colorado, followed by an appearance at the annual Cheyenne Frontier Days in Cheyenne. It made another trip to Colorado on September 30 and October 1 that year.

On November 21, 2026, No. 4014 and No. 844 left Cheyenne with an excursion run to Denver for the Make-A-Wish Foundation. It is No. 844's first run since 2019.

==== 2026 coast-to-coast tour ====
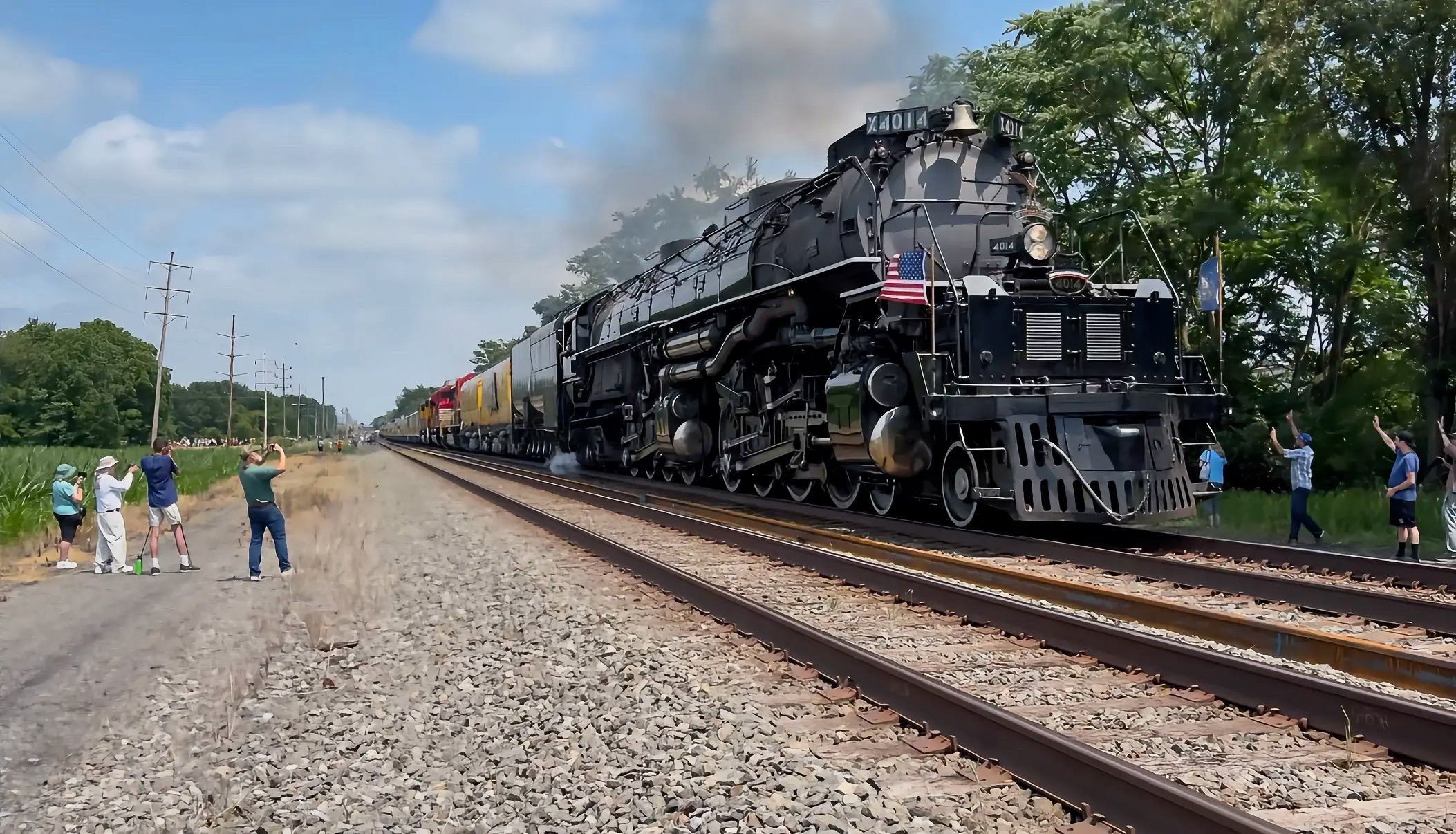
No. 4014 passes through Annville, Pennsylvania, on July 7, 2026.

In October 2025, UP announced that No. 4014 would undertake its first coast-to-coast tour, in conjunction with the United States Semiquincentennial anniversary. The tour was also meant to gin up support for UP's controversial proposal to merge with Norfolk Southern (NS). The western leg of the tour began when the locomotive left Cheyenne on March 29, 2026: it included display stops in Sacramento, California, on April 10 and 11; and Ogden on April 18 and 19, and arrived back in Cheyenne on April 24. The eastern leg of the tour began on May 25, when No. 4014 went to Omaha for display on May 30. It stopped in West Chicago, Illinois, on June 3, then went on to South Holland, Illinois, where it transferred to NS trackage for the run to Philadelphia. It was the first time a steam locomotive ran on NS trackage under its own power since 2018. (Note: In 2018, ex-Norfolk and Western (N&W) 4-8-4 J class No. 611 made a deadhead run from Spencer, North Carolina, to Roanoke, Virginia.) On June 9, No. 4014 passed the Wabtec factory in Erie, Pennsylvania, where one of UP's new FLXDrive battery-electric locomotives was being tested ahead of its debut in Southern California.

For the East Coast part of the tour, four cars were added to the rear of the 12-car consist: three NS Office Car Special (OCS) cars plus the Marco Polo observation car, on loan from the Southeastern Railway Museum in Duluth, Georgia. No. 4014 stopped in Fort Wayne, Indiana, on June 5, then continued on to Buffalo, New York, where it stopped on June 10. It crossed the Genesee Arch Bridge in Portageville, New York, on June 11 and the Tunkhannock Viaduct in Nicholson, Pennsylvania, for photos on June 13. It then caught up with ex-Reading T-1 class 4-8-4 No. 2102, which was pulling an excursion from Pittston to Nesquehoning on the Reading Blue Mountain and Northern Railroad (RBMN). The next day, No. 4014 left Nesquehoning with a sold-out UP excursion for Pittson to benefit the Union Pacific Railroad Museum. Afterwards, it went to the Steamtown National Historic Site in Scranton to reunite with fellow Big Boy No. 4012 and run side-by-side with Baldwin Locomotive Works 0-6-0 switcher No. 26. On July 1, No. 4014 met up with No. 2102 again and stopped by the RBMN's former Jersey Central station building in Jim Thorpe. The next day, it ran on RBMN tracks to Muhlenberg Township, Pennsylvania, to meet the RBMN's No. 1776 diesel. (Note: No. 4014 arrived more than an hour late to RBMN's Reading Outer Station, where thousands of spectators had been waiting in the 106 °F (41 °C) heat. More than 100 people suffered heat illness, including 35 who were taken to the hospital for evaluation and care.) The Big Boy then traveled to Philadelphia for the American semiquincentennial ceremonies on July 4-5.

No. 4014 began its return trip on July 6, departing Philadelphia. The following day, it made a whistle stop at Lebanon, Pennsylvania; met a specially-moved Acela II at Harrisburg; and traversed the Rockville Bridge. On July 8, running on the ex-Pennsylvania Railroad's (PRR) Pittsburgh Line, it stopped in Lewistown and then Altoona, Pennsylvania, where it sat on display at the Railroaders Memorial Museum on July 9-10. On July 11, the locomotive traversed the ex-PRR Horseshoe Curve in Blair County, Pennsylvania, pausing for photos; went through Allegheny Mountain; and stopped at Cresson and Leetsdale, which was near the Pittsburgh area. Continuing on to Ohio, No. 4014 made stops at Struthers (July 12), Rocky River (July 13), Fostoria (July 14), and Continental (July 15), before arriving in Fort Wayne on July 16. On July 17, No. 4014 returned to South Holland and was transferred to UP's ex-Alton route for its journey to St. Louis with stops at Springfield and Girard, Illinois. Leaving St. Louis on July 20, No. 4014 stopped briefly at the National Museum of Transportation in the suburb of Kirkwood, Missouri, to reunite with Big Boy No. 4006 and meet up with Norfolk and Western No. 2156, a 2-8-8-2 Y6a class locomotive. It made its last scheduled stops of the coast-to-coast tour—in Kansas City, Missouri, on July 23 and Denver, Colorado, on July 28—and arrived back in Cheyenne on July 29. It had traveled 7,145.48 miles (11,499.54 km), making more than 75 whistle stops and 16 display-day appearances.

== See also ==
- Chesapeake and Ohio class H-8
- Norfolk and Western 1218
- Union Pacific 3985
- Union Pacific 4023
- Western Maryland Scenic Railroad 1309

== Bibliography ==
- Wilson, Jeff (2020). Union Pacific's Big Boys: The Complete Story from History to Restoration (1st ed.). Firecrown Media. ISBN 978-1-62700-792-4.
