= Santa Fe class 3450 =

ATSF 3450 class
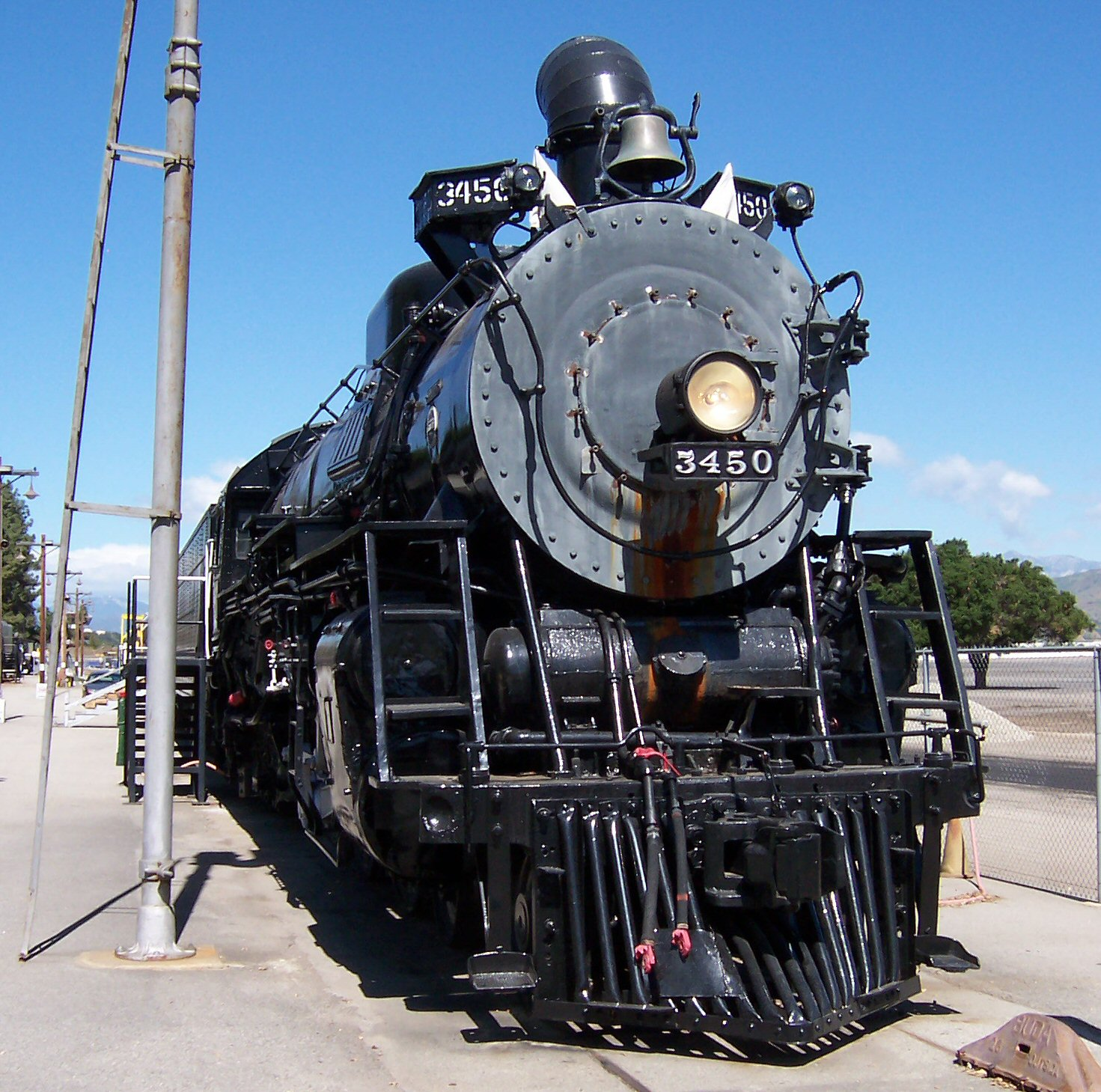
- ATSF No. 3450 on static display at the RailGiants Train Museum
Type and origin
- Power type: Steam
- Builder: Baldwin Locomotive Works
- Build date: 1927
- Total produced: 10
Specifications
- Configuration
  - Whyte: 4-6-4
  - UIC: 2′C2′ h2s
- Gauge: 4 ft 8 1/2 in (1,435 mm) standard gauge
- Driver dia.: 73 in (1,854 mm), later: 79 in (2,007 mm)
- Length: 97 ft 11 in (29.85 m)
- Adhesive weight: 198,000 lb (90,000 kilograms; 90 metric tons), later: 206,000 lb (93,000 kilograms; 93 metric tons)
- Loco weight: 343,900 lb (156,000 kilograms; 156.0 metric tons), later: 352,600 lb (159,900 kilograms; 159.9 metric tons)
- Tender weight: 283,000 lb (128,000 kilograms; 128 metric tons), later: 298,600 lb (135,400 kilograms; 135.4 metric tons)
- Total weight: 626,500 lb (284,200 kilograms; 284.2 metric tons), later: 651,200 lb (295,400 kilograms; 295.4 metric tons)
- Fuel type: New: Coal; Now: Oil
- Fuel capacity: 5,000 US gal (19,000 L; 4,200 imp gal)
- Water cap.: 15,000 US gal (57,000 L; 12,000 imp gal)
- Firebox
  - Grate area: 88 sq ft (8.2 m^{2})
- Boiler pressure: 220 lbf/in^{2} (1.52 MPa), later: 230 lbf/in^{2} (1.59 MPa)
- Cylinders: Two, outside
- Cylinder size: 25 in × 28 in (635 mm × 711 mm)
- Valve gear: Walschaerts
- Valve type: Piston valves
Performance figures
- Maximum speed: 110 mph (177 km/h)
- Tractive effort: 44,250 lbf (196.8 kN), later: 43,307 lbf (192.6 kN)
- Factor of adh.: 4.42, later: 4.76
Career
- Operators: Atchison, Topeka & Santa Fe Railway
- Class: 3450
- Numbers: 3450–3459
- Preserved: One (No. 3450) preserved, remainder scrapped
- Disposition: No. 3450 on display at the RailGiants Train Museum in Pomona, California

The Santa Fe class 3450 consisted of ten 4-6-4 "Hudson" type steam locomotives built by the Baldwin Locomotive Works (BLW) in 1927. Built as coal-burners, they were later converted to oil-burning during the 1930s. At the same time, the locomotives were given 79-inch (2,007 mm) driving wheels instead of their original 73-inch (1,854 mm), and the boiler pressures increased from 220 to 230 lbf/in^{2} (1.52 to 1.59 MPa). Combined, these changes reduced the starting tractive effort from 44,250 to 43,300 lbf (196.8 to 192.6 kN), but increased the top speed and efficiency. Their early service was in the Midwest, between Chicago and Colorado; later, some were assigned to service in the San Joaquin Valley of California between Bakersfield and Oakland.

They were smaller and less powerful locomotives than the later 3460 class "Hudson" type, but were capable of equivalently high speeds.

The first locomotive built, No. 3450, was donated by the Santa Fe in 1955 to the Railway & Locomotive Historical Society's Southern California chapter, and is preserved at the Society's museum in the Los Angeles County Fair grounds at Pomona, California. The locomotive sits inside the RailGiants Train Museum. It is not operational, but preserved in good condition as a static exhibit. It received a cosmetic restoration between 2013-2021.

== Other Images ==
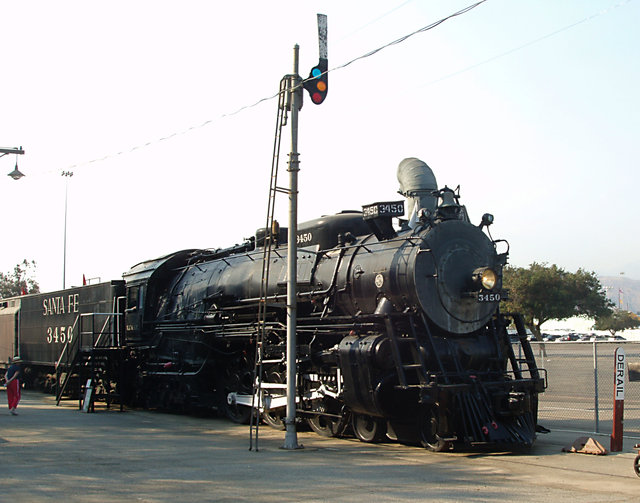
3450 4-6-4 steam locomotive

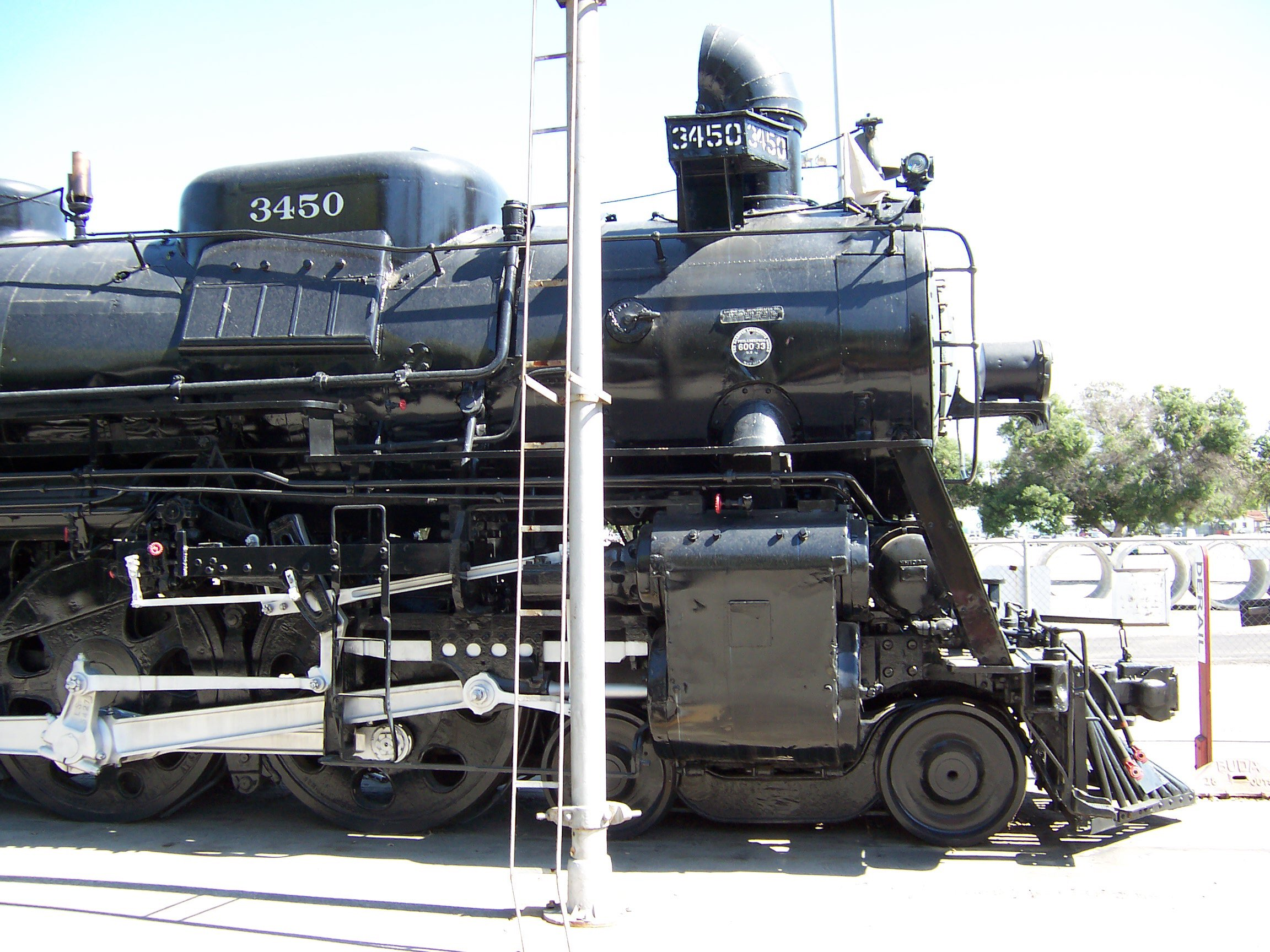
Front of #3450

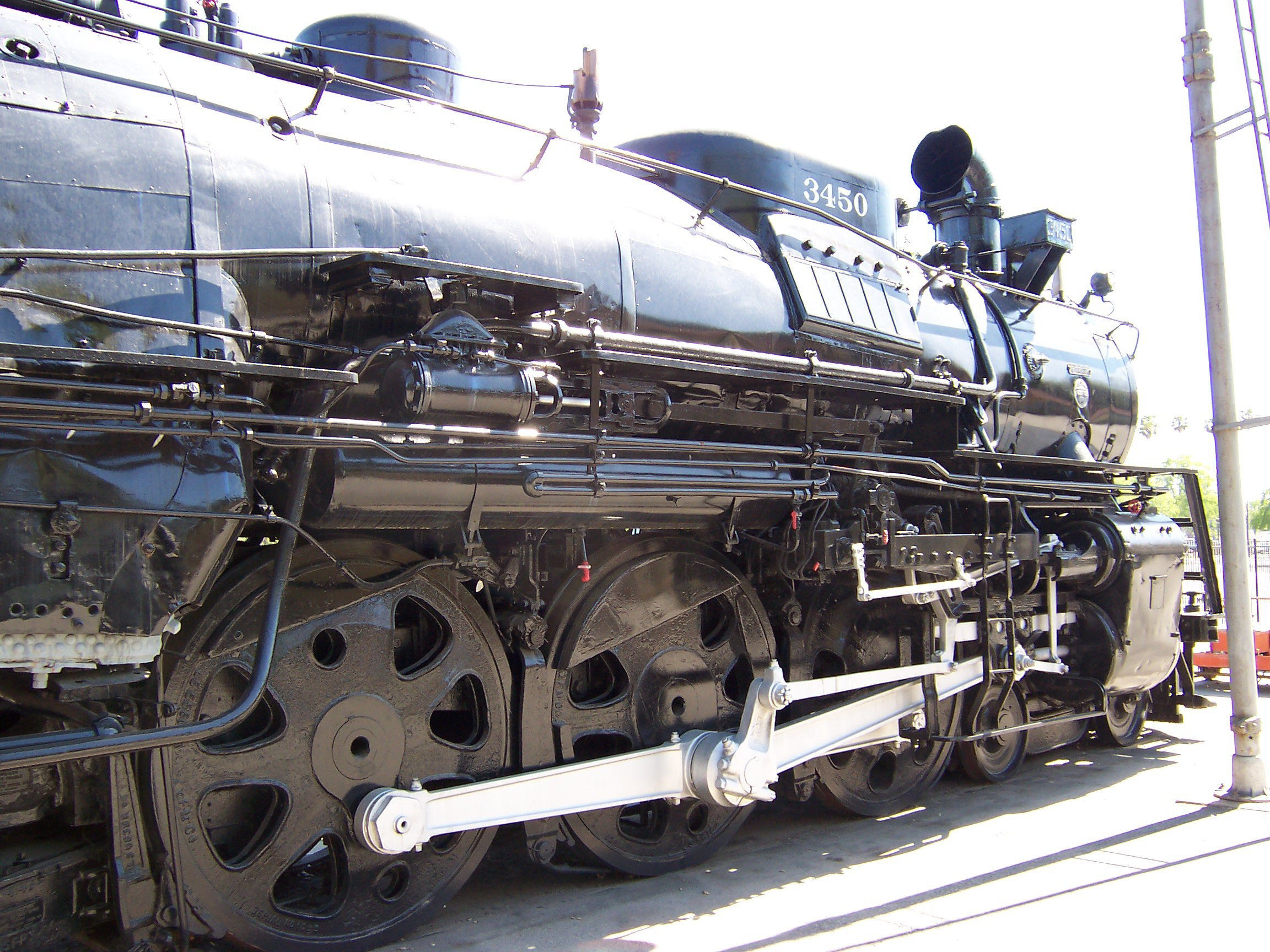
Side of #3450
