= Mergers and acquisitions in the United States railroad industry =

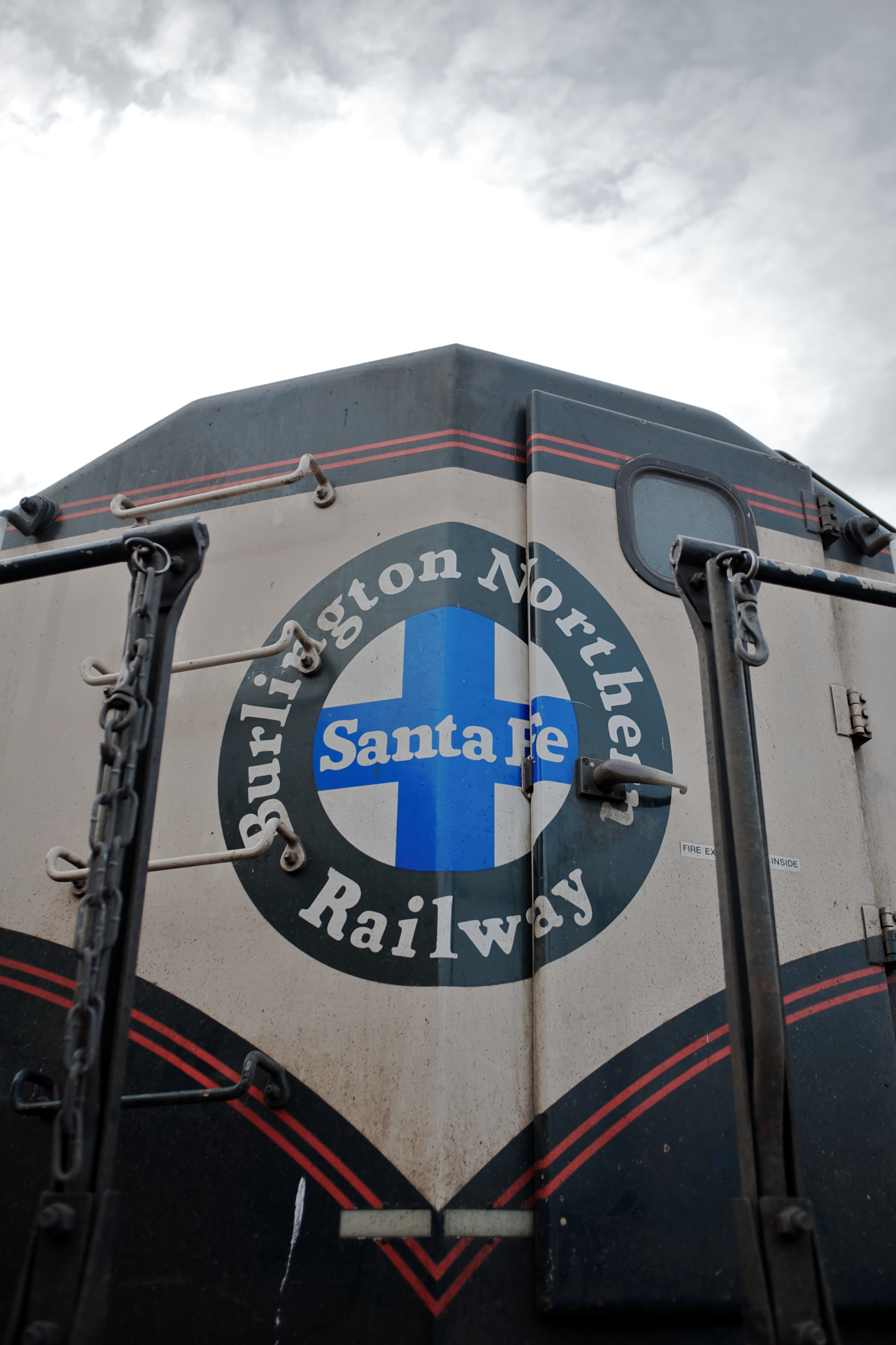
BNSF Railway was created by the merger of the Burlington Northern Railroad and Atchison, Topeka and Santa Fe Railway

Since the late 19th century, mergers and acquisitions in the United States railroad industry have steadily consolidated the sector. The industry was originally made up of hundreds of independent carriers, but has since evolved into one of the most concentrated sectors in transportation. Financial pressures, regulations, and changes in operational efficiency all contributed to this transformation. As of 2025, seven Class I railroads operate in North America, with four of them accounting for most freight rail traffic in the United States.

Financiers such as J.P. Morgan were responsible for much of the early consolidation, as well as the Panic of 1893 and the Great Depression, which pushed many railroads into bankruptcy. Federal control during World War II and later regulatory changes reflected the railroads’ economic importance and the effort to streamline a fragmented system.

The Staggers Rail Act triggered major merger activity in the 1980s and 1990s, including the rise of CSX, the growth of Union Pacific and Norfolk Southern, the creation of BNSF, and the split of Conrail. These transactions reduced the number of Class I railroads.

Consolidation has continued in the 21st century, including the 2023 creation of Canadian Pacific Kansas City and the proposed 2025 Union Pacific–Norfolk Southern merger.

== Historical overview ==
The first major wave of railroad consolidation took place in the early 20th century, influenced by financiers such as J.P. Morgan. By reorganizing and merging railroad companies across the country, Morgan and others helped centralize control of the industry. By 1906, seven entities controlled two-thirds of U.S. rail mileage, with significant portions held by the New York Central, the Pennsylvania Railroad, and interests associated with Morgan.

Although the Interstate Commerce Act of 1887 introduced federal regulation of railroads, the industry continued to experience widespread consolidation. Companies pursued mergers to reduce competition and gain efficiencies. The Panic of 1893, caused in part by overbuilding and unstable railroad financing, led to numerous bank failures. By mid-1894, about one-quarter of U.S. railroads (over 40,000 miles of track) had gone bankrupt, prompting further consolidation through acquisitions.

=== Depression and World War II era (1930-1945) ===
The Great Depression severely impacted the railroad industry. Between 1928 and 1933, industry revenue declined by 50%, and by 1937, approximately 70,000 miles of track (around 30% of the national total) were in receivership. In response, many companies either failed or merged in efforts to remain financially viable during the economic crisis.

During World War II, the U.S. government temporarily took control of railroad operations through the United States Railroad Administration to meet wartime transportation demands. The experience underscored the rail network’s importance to the national economy and revealed inefficiencies in its fragmented structure.

== Modern merger era ==
=== Penn Central and the crisis of the 1960s-1970s ===
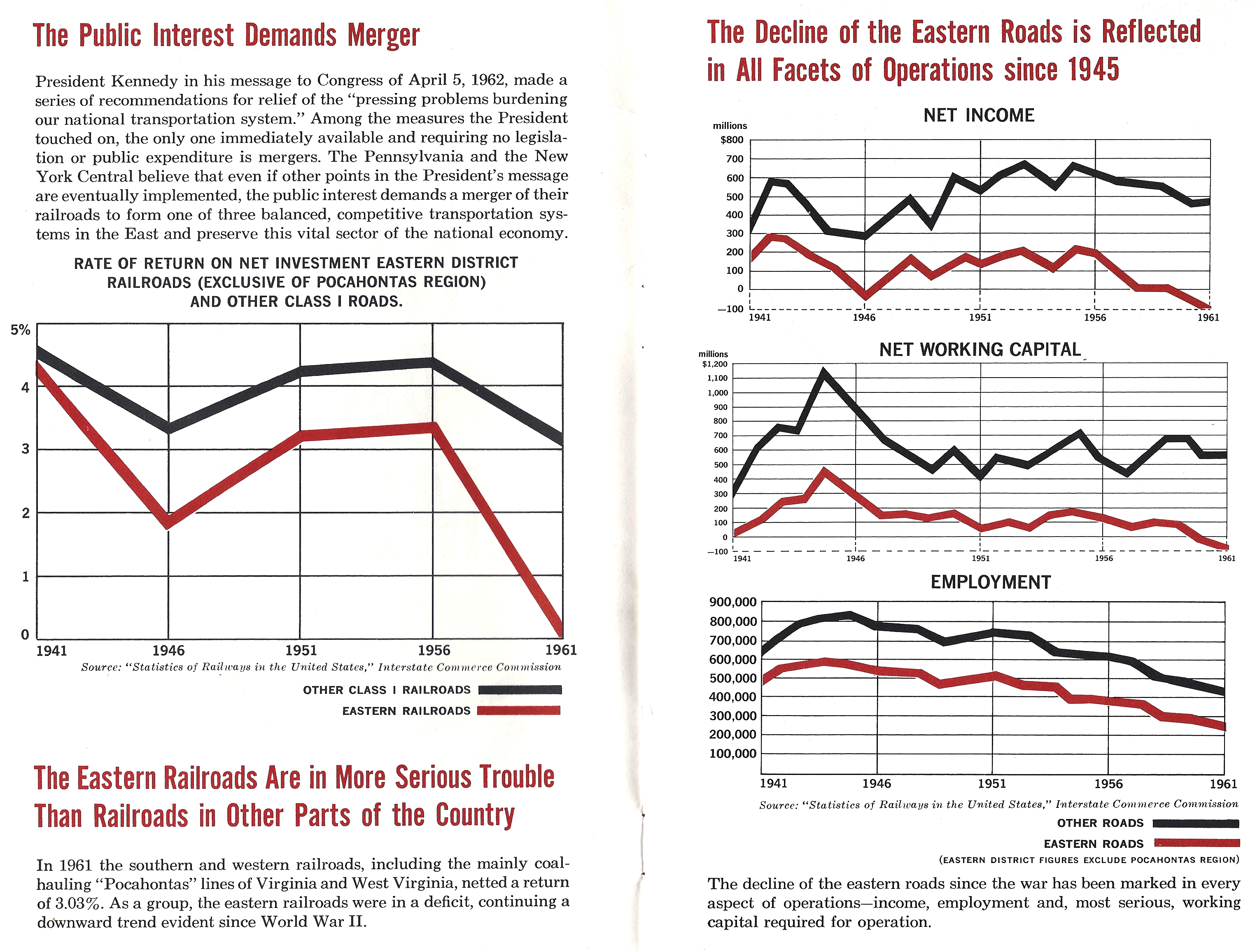
"Public Interest Demands Merger", a 1962 publicity booklet produced by the Penn Central Merger Information Committee

One of the most notable railroad mergers of the modern era was the formation of Penn Central in 1968. The Pennsylvania Railroad and New York Central Railroad, long-standing competitors, merged in an effort to remain financially viable. The merger was finalized on February 1, 1968, when the Pennsylvania Railroad was renamed the Pennsylvania New York Central Transportation Company, operating under the trade name "Penn Central".

The Penn Central merger faced serious operational challenges from the beginning. The two companies struggled to integrate their management structures, workforces, and systems. Conflicting union agreements hindered coordination, and incompatible computer systems led to frequent tracking errors. At its worst, the company was losing approximately $1 million per day.

Penn Central filed for bankruptcy on June 21, 1970, less than three years after the merger. At the time, it was the largest corporate bankruptcy in U.S. history. The collapse had significant economic consequences for the Northeast and raised concerns about large-scale mergers within the railroad industry.

=== Burlington Northern formation (1970) ===
In contrast to the Penn Central bankruptcy, the 1970 merger that formed Burlington Northern was considered a success. Established on March 2, 1970, Burlington Northern resulted from the merger of the Northern Pacific Railway, Great Northern Railway, Chicago, Burlington & Quincy Railroad, and Spokane, Portland & Seattle Railway. Planning for the merger began in 1956, led by the Great Northern and Northern Pacific.

The Burlington Northern merger created a 23,000-mile rail network extending from Chicago to Canada, the upper Great Lakes, the Pacific Northwest, and south to the Gulf of Mexico via Texas. At the time, it was the largest rail system in the United States and is regarded as one of the most successful major railroad mergers.

== Staggers Act and deregulation (1980) ==
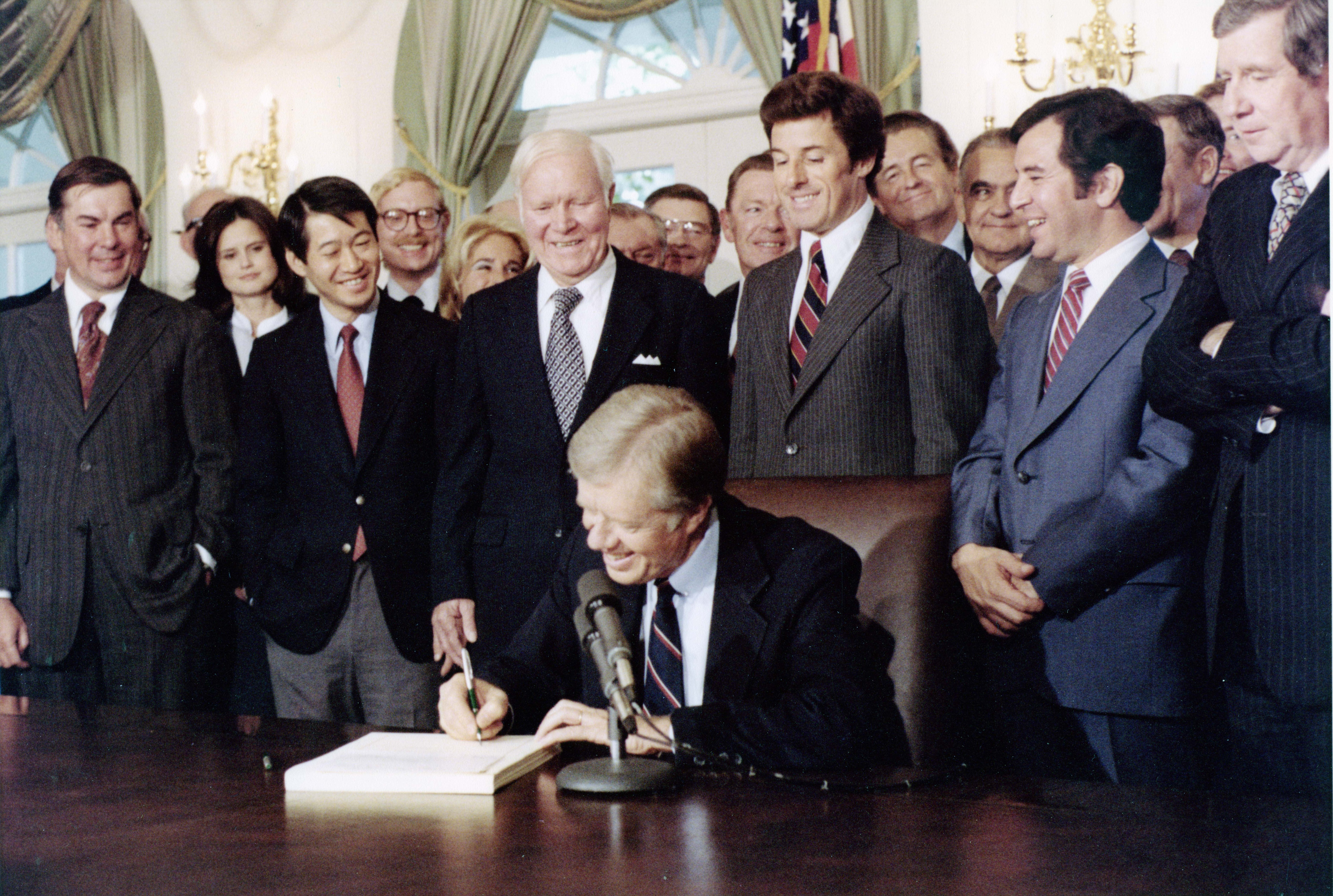
Signing of the Staggers Rail Act of 1980 by Jimmy Carter

The Staggers Rail Act of 1980 marked a significant shift in U.S. railroad policy by partially deregulating the industry. It reduced federal oversight and removed many restrictions on mergers and pricing, replacing the regulatory framework established by the Interstate Commerce Act of 1887.

Key provisions of the Staggers Rail Act included allowing rail carriers to set their own rates unless there was a lack of competition, eliminating industry-wide rate adjustments, and requiring railroads to provide access to their tracks in bottleneck situations. The Act also permitted carriers to establish private contracts without regulatory review and affirmed the dismantling of the collective rate-making system.

The Staggers Rail Act had a lasting impact on the railroad industry. When adjusted for inflation, average rail rates in 2024 were 44% lower than in 1981. Between 1980 and 2024, U.S. freight railroads invested an estimated $840 billion of their own funds in capital improvements and maintenance.

== Major mergers of the 1980s-1990s ==
During the first wave (1980 to 1985), the deregulation introduced by the Staggers Rail Act led to a wave of mergers:

- 1980: Burlington Northern and St. Louis-San Francisco (Burlington Northern)
- 1980: Seaboard Coast Line, Chesapeake and Ohio, and Baltimore and Ohio (CSX)
- 1982: Louisville and Nashville and CSX (CSX)
- 1982: Union Pacific, Western Pacific, Missouri Pacific (Union Pacific)
- 1982: Southern Railway and Norfolk and Western (Norfolk Southern)
- 1985: Southern Pacific and St. Louis South-Western (Southern Pacific)
- 1985: Union Pacific and Missouri-Kansas and Texas (Union Pacific)

However, the attempted Santa Fe–Southern Pacific merger was rejected by the Interstate Commerce Commission (ICC) in 1986.

During the 1990s, known as the second wave, a series of large-scale mergers led to the formation of the major freight rail systems that operate in the United States today.

Burlington Northern Santa Fe (1995): The merger of Burlington Northern and the Atchison, Topeka and Santa Fe Railway was approved by the Interstate Commerce Commission on July 20, 1995. As a primarily end-to-end merger, it created the largest rail network in North America at the time, with minimal route overlap. The consolidation was expected to produce operational efficiencies by combining Burlington Northern’s coal transport network with Santa Fe’s intermodal services.

Union Pacific-Southern Pacific (1996): The merger of Union Pacific and Southern Pacific was approved by the Surface Transportation Board in August 1996. The combined company became the largest railroad in the United States, operating 35,000 miles of track and generating $9.5 billion in revenue. The merger initially caused significant operational disruptions, leading to service delays and regulatory intervention.

Conrail split (1998-1999): In 1998, CSX and Norfolk Southern jointly acquired Conrail for $10.3 billion in what was considered one of the most complex transactions in U.S. railroad history. Norfolk Southern received 58% of Conrail’s assets, while CSX acquired 42%. The division took effect on June 1, 1999, and was structured to maintain competition in key markets. The two competitors were unwilling to give one company full control of busy industrial areas in Detroit, Philadelphia, and northern New Jersey (the Chemical Coast). A compromise solution was reached by creating Conrail Shared Assets Operations, a jointly owned switching and terminal railroad which would operate in these areas on behalf of both CSX and NS.

== Regulatory framework history ==
The Surface Transportation Board (STB) was established on January 1, 1996, following the abolition of the Interstate Commerce Commission. It assumed several of the ICC’s regulatory responsibilities, including oversight of railroad mergers, construction, acquisitions, and the abandonment of rail lines.

In response to service disruptions following railroad mergers in the 1990s, the Surface Transportation Board revised its merger regulations in 2001. The updated rules imposed stricter requirements on mergers involving Class I railroads, requiring applicants to provide greater evidence that a proposed transaction would serve the public interest.

In March 2000, the STB imposed a 15-month moratorium on major railroad merger filings in response to concerns about continued industry consolidation. The U.S. Court of Appeals upheld the moratorium, ruling that federal agencies have the authority to delay actions when necessary to achieve broader statutory objectives.

The moratorium was imposed on the grounds that “the rail community is not in a position to now undertake what will likely be the final round of restructuring of the North American railroad industry.” This reflected concerns about the industry’s ability to manage further consolidation at that time.

== Current industry structure ==
As of 2025, Class I railroads are defined as those with annual operating revenues exceeding $1,074,600,816, a threshold adjusted annually for inflation. The classification system was established in 1992 with a base level of $250 million and determines which mergers are subject to the highest level of scrutiny by the STB.

As of 2025, there are seven Class I railroads operating in North America:

- BNSF Railway
- CSX Transportation
- Norfolk Southern
- Union Pacific
- Canadian Pacific Kansas City
- Canadian National
- Kansas City Southern de Mexico

The railroad industry has undergone significant consolidation. In 1976, there were 30 independent Class I railroad systems comprising 63 Class I railroads. As of today, only seven Class I railroads remain, with four of them accounting for 90% of freight rail traffic in the United States.

Studies have found that consolidation in the railroad industry between 1983 and 1997 led to a reduction in industry costs of approximately 17 percent. While early mergers had limited impact, more recent large-scale mergers have been associated with substantial efficiency gains.

== Recent developments ==
=== Canadian Pacific-Kansas City Southern (2023) ===
The most recent major railroad merger occurred in April 2023, when Canadian Pacific acquired Kansas City Southern for $31 billion. The merger formed Canadian Pacific Kansas City (CPKC), the first single-line railway connecting Canada, the United States, and Mexico.

The Surface Transportation Board approved the merger with a set of unprecedented conditions, including a seven-year oversight period and various measures to address environmental impacts, maintain competition, and protect railroad workers. The merger was classified as end-to-end, as the two railroads had minimal overlapping routes or track redundancies.

=== Union Pacific-Norfolk Southern proposal (2025) ===
In July 2025, Union Pacific announced plans to acquire Norfolk Southern in an $85 billion transaction. The proposed merger would create the first transcontinental railroad in the United States. The deal values Norfolk Southern at $320 per share, a 25 percent premium, and would result in a combined enterprise value exceeding $250 billion. Shareholders from both companies approved of the merger in November 25, sending it to the Surface Transportation Board for regulatory approval.

The proposed merger would create a network of over 50,000 route miles across 43 states and connect approximately 100 ports. However, the transaction is subject to significant regulatory review and has drawn opposition from industry groups concerned about potential reductions in competition and increased shipping costs.

== Current trends and future outlook ==
The announcement of the Union Pacific–Norfolk Southern merger has prompted speculation about further consolidation in the industry. Analysts have suggested that the remaining major railroads, including BNSF and CSX, may consider mergers to maintain their competitive position.

The adoption of Precision Scheduled Railroading (PSR) has significantly altered railroad operations. PSR emphasizes the efficient movement of individual railcars over assembling long trains, aiming to provide more consistent and reliable service. However, its implementation has raised concerns about safety and infrastructure, as railroads have reduced staffing and streamlined operations to lower costs.

Intermodal transportation has become a key driver of growth in the railroad industry. Intermodal volumes through November 2024 increased by 9.1% compared to the previous year. Rail intermodal links the trucking and maritime sectors, contributing to more flexible and resilient supply chains.

== See also ==
- History of rail transportation in the United States
- United States Railroad Administration
