= 3450 =

3450 may refer to:

- A.D. 3450, a year in the 4th millennium CE
- 3450 BC, a year in the 4th millennium BCE
- 3450, a number in the 3000 (number) range

== Other uses ==
- 3450 Dommanget, an asteroid in the Asteroid Belt, the 3450th asteroid registered
- Santa Fe class 3450, a class of steam locomotive
- Texas Farm to Market Road 3450, a state highway
