= RailGiants Train Museum =

Railroad museum in California, United States

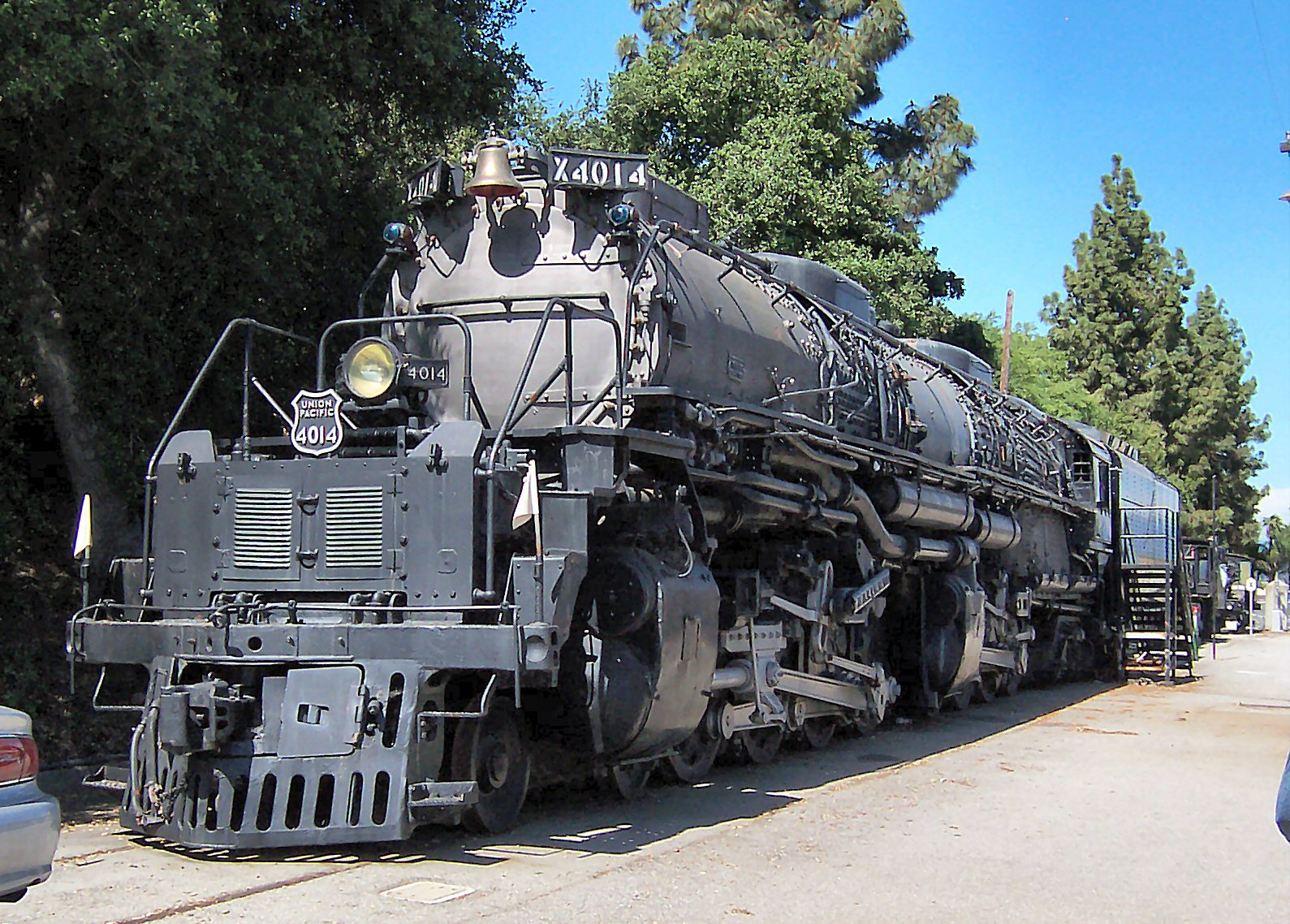
- Union Pacific Big Boy No. 4014 on display at the RailGiants Train Museum in 2005, before being moved out in late 2013 for restoration.

- Location within California Location within the United States
- Location: Fairplex, Pomona, California, United States
- Coordinates: 34.083641°N 117.770251°W
- Type: Rail transport display
- Collection size: Depot and rolling stock
- Public transit access: San Bernardino Line (Pomona–North station)
- Website: www.railgiants.org

RailGiants Train Museum is a railroad museum of historic trains located at the Fairplex in Pomona, California, United States. It is owned and maintained by the Southern California Chapter of the Railway & Locomotive Historical Society. The museum also operates the Fairplex Garden Railway, a garden railroad which uses G scale model trains. It has over 80 volunteers and from November through July, runs the second Sunday of every month, from 11:00am to 4:00pm, for the general public. The FGRR gears up every year for the L.A. County Fair, its primary show. In December various members run their Christmas trains.

The museum was closed indefinitely in March 2020 as a result of the COVID-19 pandemic, but after renovations, it reopened in May 2022.

== Collection ==
The collection features historic locomotives which visitors may board. The museum also features a historic train station (the 1887-vintage Arcadia, California depot of the Atchison, Topeka and Santa Fe Railway), a library, and a collection of railway memorabilia. Currently, entry to the museum is free and open to the public on the second weekend of each month, besides daily in May during the L.A. County Fair.

A notable locomotive in the collection was Union Pacific Big Boy No. 4014, which was on display at the museum until late 2013, when it was moved out for restoration.

The museum was featured in Visiting... with Huell Howser along with Kidsongs Boppin with the Biggles songs, Little red caboose & The Locomotion Episode 1015.

== Displayed locomotives ==
Image	Railroad	Builder	Type/Model	Built	History
	Outer Harbor Terminal #2	Schenectady Locomotive Works	0-6-0	10/1887	Built as ATSF#590. Sold in 1893 to Southern California #40 and transferred to ATSF#2285 in 1900. Sold in 1909 to OHT#2. Donated 1956.
	United States Potash #3	Baldwin Locomotive Works	2-8-0, 3 ft gauge	3/1903	Built as Arizona Copper Co #20. Later became Morenci Southern #20. Sold in 1921 to Phelps Dodge Corp. Sold in 1931 to United States Potash #3. Donated 1956.
	Fruit Growers Supply #3	Climax Locomotive Works	Class C Climax	3/1909	Built as Northern California Lumber Co #3. Sold in 1913 to Fruit Growers Supply #3. Donated 1953.
	Atchison, Topeka & Santa Fe 3450	Baldwin Locomotive Works	4-6-4, class 3450	4/1927	Built as ATSF#3450. Donated 1955.
	Southern Pacific 5021	American Locomotive Company	4-10-2, class SP-2	5/1926	Built in Schenectady as Southern Pacific #5021. Donated 1956 and displayed in San Bernardino. Moved to the RailGiants museum in the 1970s.
	Union Pacific 9000	American Locomotive Company	4-12-2, 9000 Class	3/1926	Built as the first of the 9000 class in Dunkirk as Union Pacific #9000, with the cost of construction shared between the UP and ALCO. Retired in May 1956 and donated to the museum.
	Union Pacific 3105	Electro Motive Diesel	SD40-2C	6/1979	Built as Missouri Pacific #6027. Merged into Union Pacific #3927, and renumbered in 2003 to #3105. Traded for Union Pacific #4014 in 2014. First (and currently only) operational locomotive in the museum.
	Union Pacific 6915	Electro Motive Diesel	DDA40X	10/1969	Built as Union Pacific #6915. Donated 1987.

== See also ==
- List of railway museums
