= 1927 in rail transport =

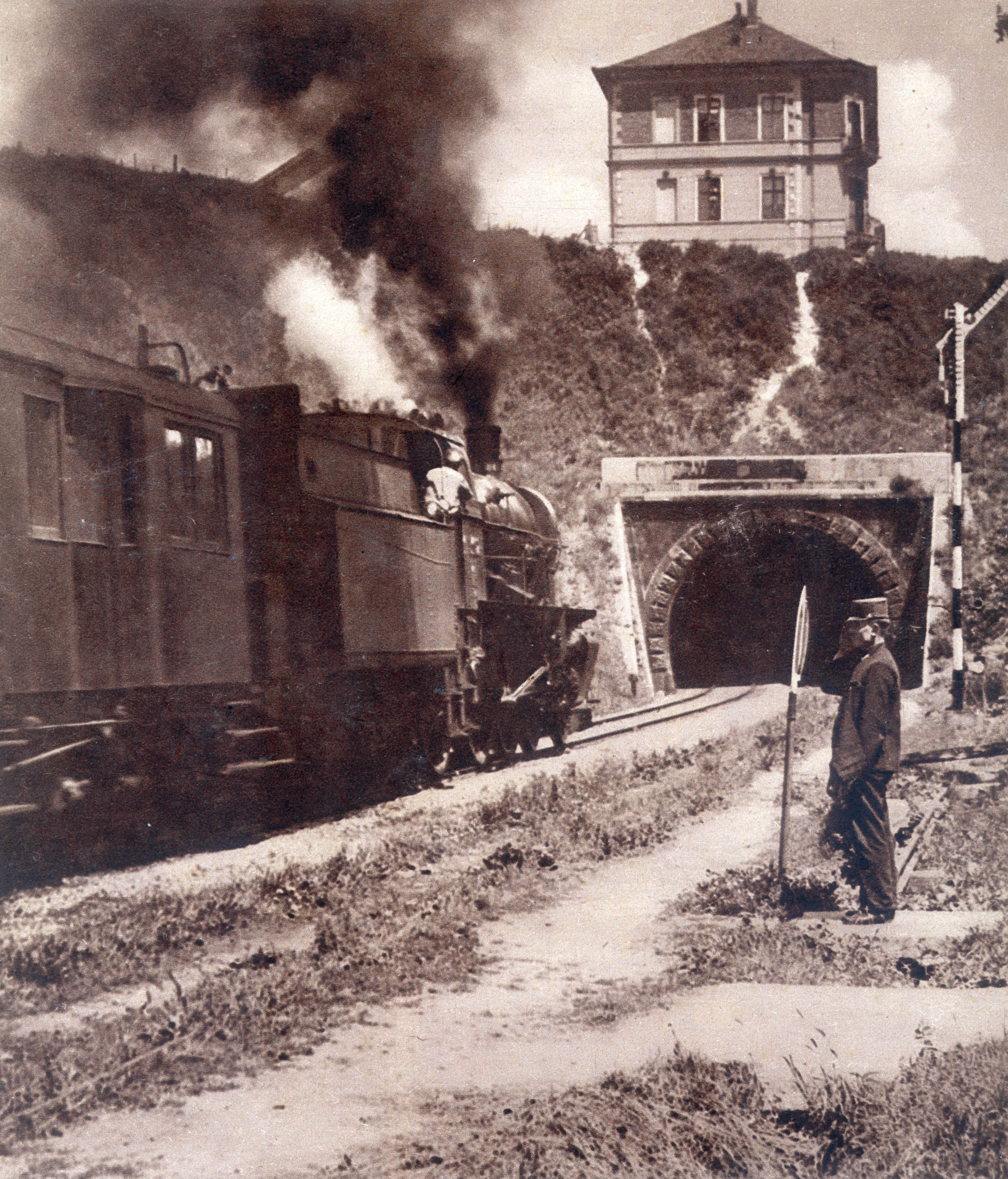
The southern railway tunnel at the western foot of Gellért Hill in Hungary - 1927.

This article lists events related to rail transport that occurred in 1927.

== Events ==
=== January events ===
- January 1 - John J. Bernet succeeds Frederick D. Underwood as president of the Erie Railroad.

=== February events ===
- February 14 - The Hull Paragon rail accident in England kills 12 people.

=== April events ===
- April 1 - Odawara Express Railway Line, connecting to Shinjuku Station of Tokyo and Odawara Station, via Machida Station route officially completed in Japan (predecessor of Odakyu Line).
- April 3 - Yosan Line, Takamatsu to Matsuyama route officially completed in Shikoku Island, Japan.

=== May events ===
- May 15 - The Grand Trunk Western Railroad introduces the Maple Leaf passenger train between Chicago, Illinois and Montreal, Quebec.

=== June events ===
- June 1
  - Turkish State Railways formed.
  - Aichi Electronic Railway Line, Atsuta Jingu-mae Station of Nagoya to Toyohashi Station route officially completed in Aichi Prefecture, Japan (predecessor of Meitetsu Nagoya Line).
- June 29 - Great Western Railway (England) takes delivery of its first 'King' Class 4-6-0 express passenger steam locomotive from its Swindon Works, No. 6000 King George V.

=== July events ===
- July 6 – Hebikubo Station (蛇窪駅), later renamed as Togoshi-kōen Station, in Shinagawa, Tokyo, Japan, opens.
- July 16 - Opening of Romney, Hythe and Dymchurch Railway on the English Channel coast (8.25 mi (13.28 km) of 15 in (380 mm) gauge).

=== August events ===
- August 24 - The Sevenoaks railway accident in England kills 13.
- August 25 - Detroit and Mackinac Railway officially abandons the section from Au Sable River Jct. to Comins and the Curran Branch between Hardy and Beavers.

=== September events ===
- September 1 – The Trunk Line in Norway takes electric traction into use between Oslo and Lillestrøm.
- September 24 – October 15 – Baltimore and Ohio Railroad celebrates its centennial in the Fair of the Iron Horse in Baltimore, Maryland.

=== October events ===
- October 10 - First Maine Central Railroad train over Carlton Bridge ends rail ferry service across the Kennebec River at Bath, Maine.

=== December events ===
- December 3 - Official opening of London Post Office Railway.
- December 30 - The Ginza Line, the oldest subway line in Asia, opens in Tokyo, Japan between Asakusa and Ueno.

=== Unknown date events ===
- Rail transport in Cameroon extended to Yaoundé.
- American Locomotive Company builds first 4-6-4 tender locomotive, for the New York Central; also, the first 4-8-4, for the Northern Pacific Railroad.
- American Car and Foundry acquires Shippers Car Line.
- Narrow gauge Sandy River and Rangeley Lakes Railroad ends train service to the Rangeley Lakes House destination hotel.
- First Dutch National Railway Museum established.

== Deaths ==
=== May deaths ===
- May 23 - Henry Huntington, nephew of Collis P. Huntington and executive in charge of Pacific Electric Railway in the early part of the 20th century (born 1850).

=== October deaths ===
- October 7 – Godfrey M. Hyams, financier for Deepwater Railway and Tidewater Railway, dies (b. 1859).
- October 16 – David Macpherson, Canadian-born American civil engineer (b. 1854)

=== November deaths ===
- November 17 - Charles Sanger Mellen, president of Northern Pacific Railway 1897-1903 and New Haven Railroad beginning in 1903, dies (born 1852).
