= Union Pacific 9000 Class =

Steam locomotive class

Union Pacific 9000-series
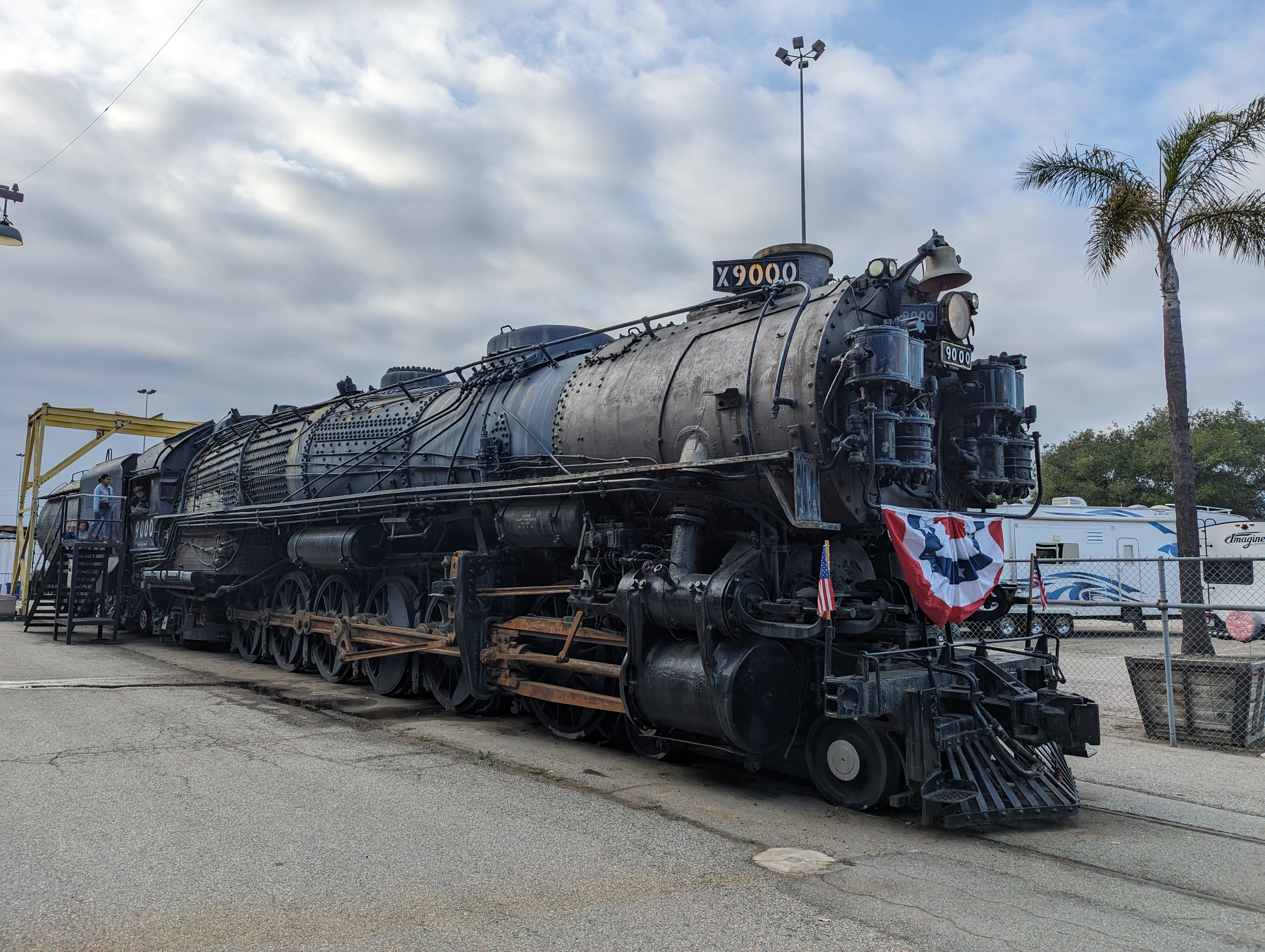
- The prototype, UP 9000, as preserved at the Los Angeles County Fairplex in Pomona, California.
Type and origin
- Power type: Steam
- Builder: American Locomotive Company
- Build date: 1926–1930
- Total produced: 88
Specifications
- Configuration
  - Whyte: 4-12-2
  - UIC: 2′F1′ h3g
- Gauge: 4 ft 8 1/2 in (1,435 mm)
- Driver dia.: 67 in (1,702 mm)
- Wheelbase: Loco & tender: 91.50 ft (27.89 m)
- Length: 102 ft 7 in (31.27 m)
- Axle load: 59,000 lb (26,762 kg; 27 t)
- Adhesive weight: 354,000 lb (160,572 kg; 161 t)
- Loco weight: 496,500 lb (225,209 kg; 225 t)
- Tender weight: 310,599 lb (140,885 kg; 141 t)
- Total weight: 807,099 lb (366,094 kg; 366 t)
- Fuel type: Coal
- Fuel capacity: 44,000 lb (19,958 kg; 20 t)
- Water cap.: 18,000 US gallons (68,000 L; 15,000 imp gal)
- Firebox
  - Grate area: 108.25 sq ft (10.057 m^{2})
- Boiler: 92 in (2,337 mm)
- Boiler pressure: 220 lbf/in^{2} (1.52 MPa)
- Heating surface
  - Firebox: 591 sq ft (54.9 m^{2})
- Superheater
  - Heating area: 2,560 sq ft (238 m^{2})
- Cylinders: Three, two outside, one inside
- Cylinder size: Outside (2): 27 in × 32 in (686 mm × 813 mm); Inside (1): 27 in × 31 in (686 mm × 787 mm)
- Valve gear: Gresley Conjugated
Performance figures
- Maximum speed: 50 mph (80 km/h)
- Tractive effort: 96,646 lbf (429.9 kN)
- Factor of adh.: 3.66
Career
- Operators: Union Pacific Railroad
- Class: UP-1 through UP-5
- Numbers: 9000–9087
- Retired: 1953–1956
- Preserved: One preserved (No. 9000), remainder scrapped
- Disposition: No. 9000 on static display at the RailGiants Train Museum

The Union Pacific Railroad 9000 Class is a class of 88 4-12-2 "Union Pacific" type steam locomotives built by ALCO between 1926-1930, they have 3 cylinders. They were the largest steam locomotives fitted with Gresley conjugated valve gear licensed from the British London and North Eastern Railway. They were 102 feet in length, making them the largest rigid wheelbase locomotives ever built. But the inside cylinder made maintenance very expensive and the rigid wheelbase demanded gentle curves

== Wheel arrangement ==
The Union Pacific 9000 class was the only class of steam locomotives with a 4-12-2 wheel arrangement ever to be built, and was also the largest rigid frame locomotive ever built. Under the Whyte notation for the classification of steam locomotives, 4-12-2 represents the wheel arrangement of four leading wheels, twelve coupled driving wheels, and two trailing wheels. As the Union Pacific was the only operator of this wheel arrangement, it was often nicknamed the Union Pacific type.

Other equivalent classifications are:

- AAR wheel arrangement: 2-F-1
- UIC classification: 2′F1′ (also known as German classification and Italian classification)
- French classification: 261
- Turkish classification: 69
- Swiss classification: 6/9
- Russian classification: 2-6-1

== History ==
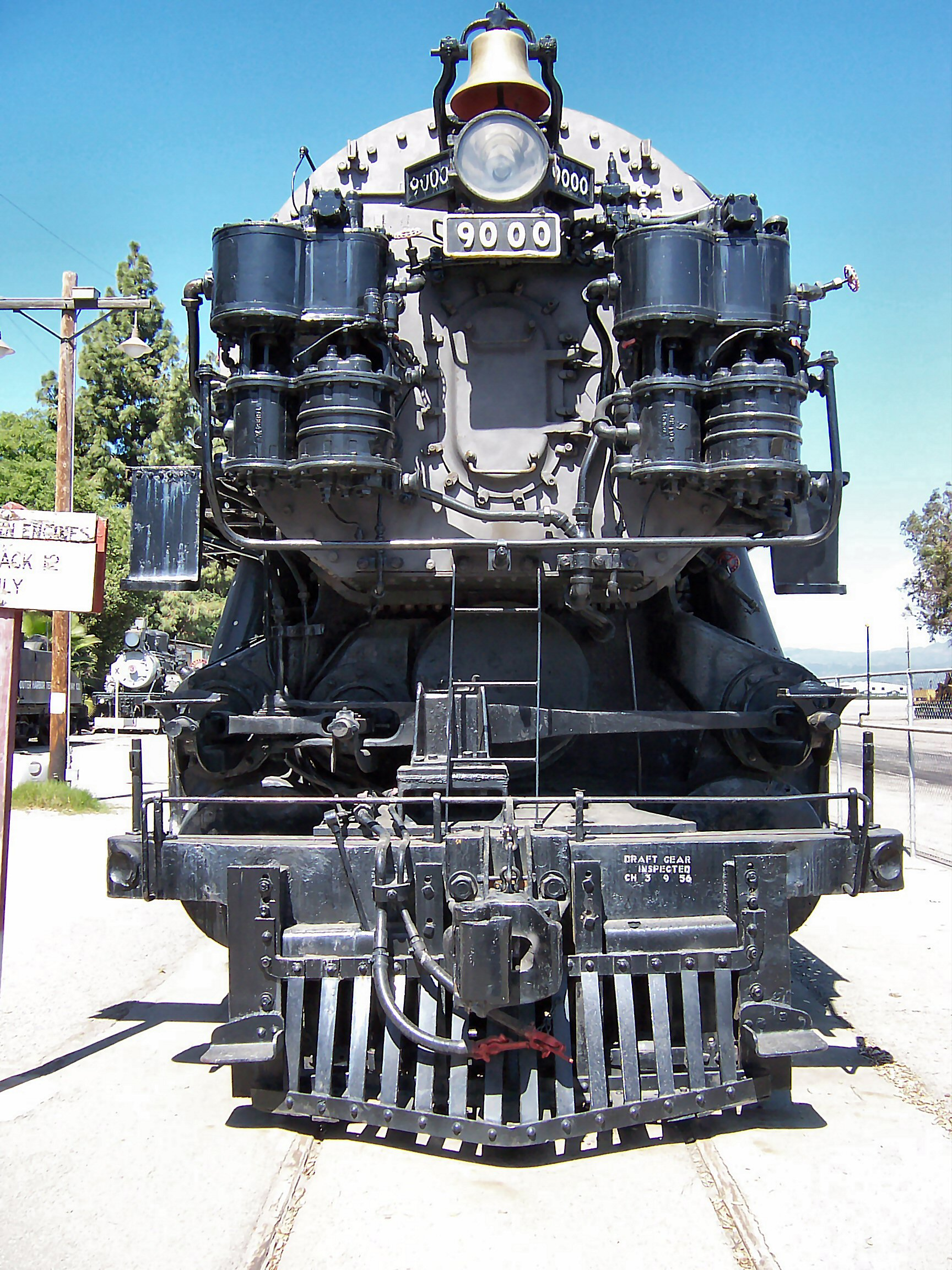
Front view of the same locomotive. The third cylinder and the mechanism that controls it can be seen below the smokebox.

The 9000 class was designed to increase the speed of freight trains across the Union Pacific's network. They are, essentially, an expansion and refinement of the 4-10-2 FTT-1 class of 1925, sharing the 3 cylinders and the conjugated valve gear invented by Sir Nigel Gresley to drive the center cylinder's valves without an additional set of valve gear. This system used two hinged levers connected to the outer cylinder's valves to operate the inner cylinder's valve. The 9000 class locomotives were the largest to use Gresley's conjugation gear. They had the longest rigid wheelbase of any non-duplex locomotive in North America, only exceeded by the Pennsylvania Railroad S-1, and the longest in the world until the Soviet Union built their unsuccessful AA20 4-14-4 locomotive in 1934.

Along with the extra cylinder, the 9000 class uses a divided drive layout, with the outside cylinders driving the third axle and the middle cylinder driving the second axle. The cylinders are set approximately 120 degrees from one another, creating 6 distinct exhaust beats per revolution as with similar 3-cylinder designs. The middle cylinder has a slightly shorter stroke than the outside cylinders (31" vs 32" respectively) to account for the 9.5 degree incline to allow the center drive rod to clear the first axle. There has been debate as to whether the first driving axle of the 4-12-2 was cranked to provide clearance for the main rod connected to the second axle. Union Pacific drawings show no such crank on the first axle; instead, the first driving axle was moved forward 18 inches to allow for sufficient clearance.

Unusually, the trailing truck has the highest axle load, rather than the driving wheels. During design, the third and fourth driving axles were planned to be "blind" (flangeless) in order to improve curve handling, but ALCO's lateral motion devices on the first and sixth axles (which allowed the axles to slide up to two inches to the side) made this unnecessary.

Due to issues with premature bearing wear on the conjugation links causing valve event timing problems with the middle cylinder, between 1934 and 1940 eight of the first fifteen locomotives had their Gresley gear removed and were converted to a "double Walschaerts" valve gear, which utilized a double eccentric (return) crank and second link on the right side to operate the middle cylinder's valve. Union Pacific referred to this system as the "third link". To equalize the weight from the extra set of valve gear, the air compressors were moved to the left side of the locomotive from the front of the smokebox resulting in the distinctive "bald face" 9000s. Locomotives with road numbers 9015 onward utilized lower maintenance, longer lifespan roller bearings in the Gresley levers instead of plain bearings, thus none of these engines were converted. The pre-1928 engines not converted received the roller bearing levers in 1940, and no further conversions were made.

Union Pacific UP classes
Year	Quantity	Class	Alco order number	Alco serial numbers	Union Pacific Number	Notes
1926	1	UP-1	B-1684	66544	Union Pacific 9000	Preserved
1926	14	UP-2	B-1684	67024–67037	Union Pacific 9001–9014	9004 to OWR&N 9708, then back to UP 9004
1928	15	UP-3	B-1706	67581–67595	Union Pacific 9015–9029	9018 suffered a boiler explosion on October 20, 1948, in Upland, Kansas, killing 3.
1928	8	UP-3	B-1708	67596–67603	Oregon-Washington Railroad and Navigation Company 9700–9707	to Union Pacific 9055–9062
1929	25	UP-4	S-1646	67944–67986	Union Pacific 9030–9054	
1930	15	UP-5	S-1701	68490–68504	Union Pacific 9063–9077	to Oregon Short Line 9500–9514
1930	10	UP-5	S-1701	68505–68514	Union Pacific 9078–9087	
Total	88					

== Operation ==
The 9000 class was overall successful at speeding up freight traffic from the 2-8-8-0 Mallets they replaced, able to pull the heavy 100 or more car trains at up to 50 miles per hour versus the 25 miles per hour or slower of the Mallets. They were trialed on the Oregon Short Line, but were not successful and were returned to service on the straighter track in the Plains states.

Number 9018 suffered a boiler explosion due to a crown sheet failure resulting from low water levels near Upland, Kansas in 1948 and was subsequently written off and retired. Otherwise, they operated in revenue service into the mid 1950s and were retired from 1953 through 1956, with the first scheduled retirement being 9008 in June 1953. The last retired, prototype number 9000, was retired in May 1956.

== Preservation ==
Only one example has survived into preservation. Union Pacific 9000, the prototype of the class, is preserved at the Railway and Locomotive Historical Society's museum at the Los Angeles County Fairplex in Pomona, California and was moved there largely under its own power. It received new boiler paint in 2006-2007.
