= Proposed merger between Union Pacific and Norfolk Southern =

- Initiator: Union Pacific Railroad
- Target: Norfolk Southern Railway
- Type: Full acquisition
- Cost: $85 billion
- Initiated: July 29, 2025
- Resulting entity: The Union Pacific Transcontinental Railroad
- Status: Pending

The proposed merger between Union Pacific Corporation and Norfolk Southern Corporation would unite two major U.S. railroads, creating what would be the first single-line railroad linking the Atlantic Coast and the Pacific Coast. It was announced on July 29, 2025, following an agreement reached by the two freight railroads the previous day, and approved by shareholders in November. The resulting railroad would be named The Union Pacific Transcontinental Railroad.

Union Pacific has proposed acquiring Norfolk Southern in a transaction valued at about $85 billion, consisting of both stock and cash. If approved, the merged company would operate under the Union Pacific name and have an estimated total value exceeding $250 billion. The merged network would span more than 50,000 route miles across 43 states and connect about 100 ports in North America.

Proponents of the deal cite the potential for faster service, expanded intermodal offerings, and increased competition with trucking, while critics warn of reduced competition and further consolidation in the U.S. rail industry. The merger is subject to review by the Surface Transportation Board, with a decision expected in 2027.

== Background ==
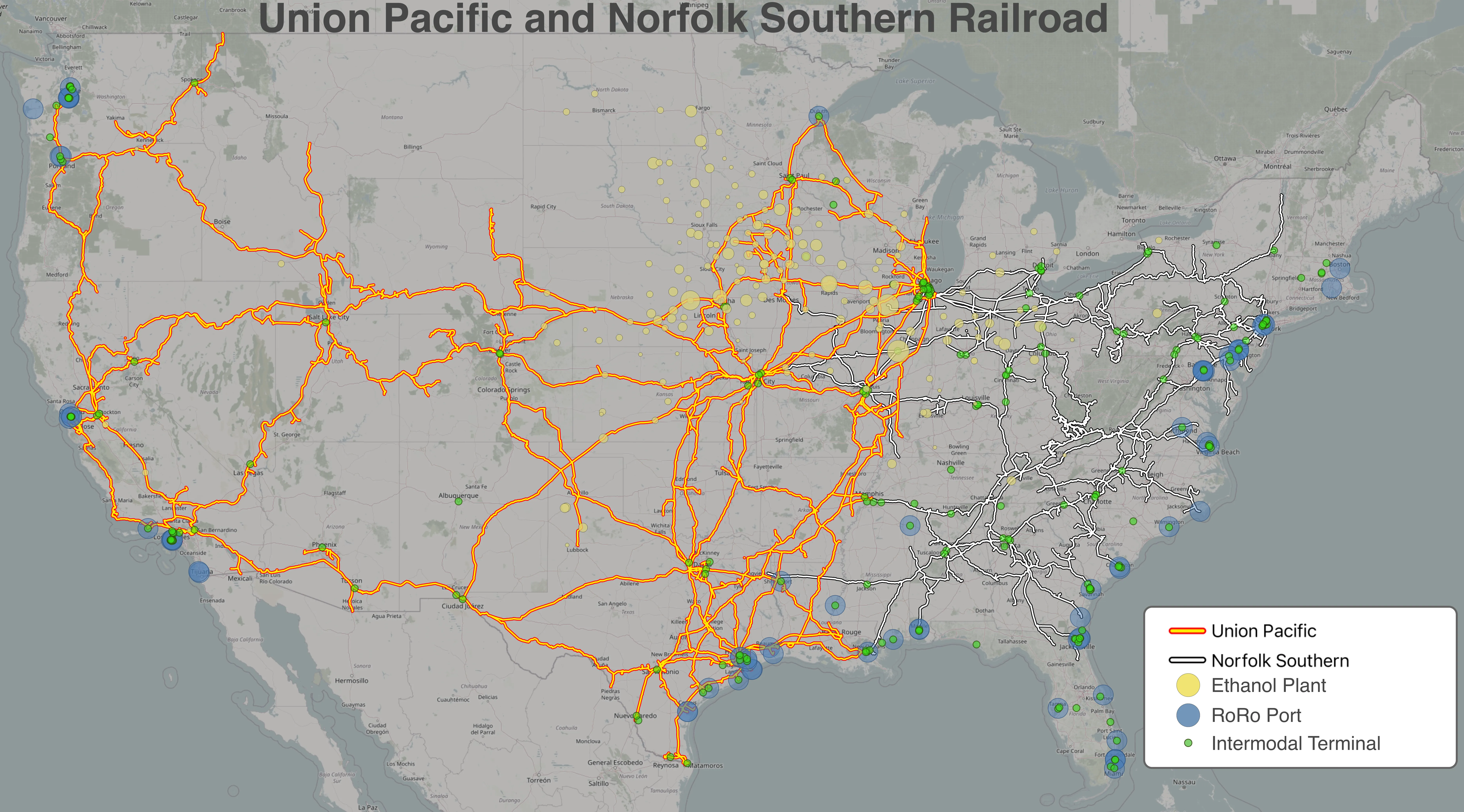
Map of the Union Pacific Railroad and the Norfolk Southern Railway

In the early 1980s, more than 30 major freight railroads operated in the United States. By the time of the merger proposal, this number had declined to six, with four companies accounting for nearly 90% of all rail freight: Union Pacific, Norfolk Southern, CSX and BNSF. Union Pacific's 1996 acquisition of Southern Pacific resulted in a major traffic backlog in Houston during 1997 and 1998, which was attributed to operational decisions. Following the 1999 division of Conrail with CSX, Norfolk Southern experienced immediate service problems caused by information technology issues. Union Pacific's network covers the West Coast, as well as parts of the Midwestern and Southern United States, while Norfolk Southern operates in the East. The combined network of the two companies would encompass over 50,000 miles of track across 43 states and provide access to about 100 ports. In 2024, the two railroads accounted for 43% of total freight movement in the United States.

== Details ==
The proposed merger between Union Pacific and Norfolk Southern was announced on July 29, 2025, one day after the companies reached an agreement on July 28, 2025. Over 99% of both companies' shareholders approved of the merger in November 2025.

The merger agreement values Norfolk Southern at about $85 billion, or $320 per share. The stock-and-cash transaction would provide Norfolk Southern shareholders with one Union Pacific common share and $88.82 in cash for each share they own. The combined company is projected to have an enterprise value exceeding $250 billion.

The merger aims to establish the first coast-to-coast freight rail operator in the United States. The combined network would cover more than 50,000 miles across 43 states and connect about 100 ports in North America. According to the companies, the goal is to improve the U.S. supply chain and address the decline in rail freight volume that has shifted to trucking since 2006.

The merger is expected to provide faster, more competitive single-line service by removing the need for car transfers and reducing interchange delays, particularly at busy hubs such as Chicago and Memphis. Company estimates project transit time improvements of 24 to 48 hours for about one million shipments annually.

The merger plan includes expanding intermodal services and opening new routes, which the companies say will enhance competition with trucking, ease highway congestion, and reduce wear on publicly funded roads.

The companies expect the merger to create opportunities in underserved "watershed markets" in the central United States, spanning from Wisconsin to Louisiana and Mississippi. In these areas, rail service has faced challenges competing with trucks on short hauls and complex routes. The expansion is projected to generate approximately $1.75 billion in additional revenue.

The merger is projected to generate about $2.75 billion in annual synergies, combining anticipated revenue growth from converting freight from trucks to rail with an estimated $1 billion in cost and productivity savings.

The companies have stated that they plan to preserve, and potentially expand, union jobs for all employees who wish to remain with the merged company. They anticipate job growth as a result of increased rail traffic.

The companies submitted their full merger application to the Surface Transportation Board (STB) on December 19, 2025. The STB accepted the application on May 28, 2026, with a request for additional information. The transaction is subject to regulatory review under statutory timelines, and the companies have said they expect the transaction to close in early 2027. Under the terms of the merger agreement, the agreement is set to expire on January 28, 2028, but provides for automatic extensions if the Surface Transportation Board's review and action extend beyond that date.

The STB application projected that the merger would lead to 1,138 layoffs and 546 transfers.

== Regulatory process ==
The proposed merger is under review by the Surface Transportation Board (STB), a U.S. government agency that regulates railroads. The review will look at how the merger might affect competition, service, safety, and the public, with input from different groups. This is the first major rail merger to be evaluated under the STB's 2001 merger rules, which require that Class I railroad mergers enhance competition, not just maintain it, and serve the public interest.

The regulatory review began with a notice of intent, which the STB acknowledged receiving on July 30, 2025. This filing gave Union Pacific and Norfolk Southern three to six months to submit a formal merger application, which was filed on December 19, 2025. The STB will set a timeline for its review. The STB rejected the application on January 16, 2026, requesting additional information. Union Pacific and Norfolk Southern submitted an amended application on April 30, 2026, which was accepted by the STB on May 28, 2026, in abeyance with a request for additional information.

A key feature of the proposed merger is that it does not use a voting trust (a voting trust is a setup where shareholders temporarily transfer their stock and voting rights to a trustee, usually for a set period of time). Unlike some past rail mergers, this deal will not be paid for until the STB approves it. The chief financial officers of Union Pacific and Norfolk Southern said a voting trust might complicate and delay the deal, and that they prefer to file a full merger application to show it will boost competition and serve the public.

The merger agreement requires Union Pacific to pay Norfolk Southern $2.5 billion if the STB rejects the deal or adds conditions that make it impossible to complete. The STB currently has one Democratic and three Republican members. The fifth seat is currently vacant and awaiting appointment by President Trump after he fired STB member Robert Primus in August 2025.

== Antitrust considerations and competition ==
The merger has raised antitrust concerns because it would cut the number of major U.S. freight railroads from six to five, and the main competitors from four to three. Senate Democratic leader Chuck Schumer described the move as a step toward "dangerous consolidation and monopoly power." An analysis found the merged company would handle about 43% of all U.S. rail freight in the past year.

Critics, including shipper groups, argue that the merger could give the combined railroad greater ability to raise prices or lower service standards. They also caution that it might prompt additional consolidation, such as a potential merger between BNSF and CSX, which could result in nearly 90% of U.S. rail freight being controlled by two companies.

Union Pacific and Norfolk Southern executives contend that the merger would strengthen competition and benefit the U.S. economy. They argue that a single coast-to-coast network would give faster, more competitive service by cutting transfer delays, adding new routes, and expanding rail–truck shipping options. The companies say this would help them compete with Canadian railroads and bring back U.S. freight traffic and jobs. They estimate the merger would cut shipping times by 24 to 48 hours for about one million loads a year and create new growth in central U.S. markets where rail has had trouble competing with trucks.

== Support ==
Union Pacific reports that it has consulted with more than 100 customers who support the merger, citing interest in lower-cost rail options, improved service visibility, and fewer delays. Hub Group, a competing intermodal operator, has publicly endorsed the deal, expecting benefits from a transcontinental network, reduced gateway congestion, and stronger competition with trucking. The Intermodal Association of North America has adopted a neutral position, focusing on the importance of efficiency and customer service.

In November 2025, Sheet Metal, Air, Rail and Transportation Workers–Transportation Division (SMART-TD) endorsed the merger after reaching a labor agreement with Union Pacific that provided a jobs-for-life guarantee for SMART-TD members.

Both of Nebraska's U.S. senators have expressed public support for the merger.

== Opposition ==
Seven shipper associations, including the Freight Rail Customer Alliance, have urged regulators to block the merger or impose strict conditions, citing concerns over potential price increases, reduced service quality, and fewer routing options. The American Chemistry Council and the Soy Transportation Coalition have also warned that the deal could raise costs for key industries.

Rail unions have generally resisted consolidation over job and service risks. Sheet Metal, Air, Rail and Transportation Workers–Transportation Division expressed "measured skepticism", citing safety, service, and long-term industry health, and history of furloughs, contrasting it with Norfolk Southern's pledge not to furlough conductors or engineers. The union stated that it had "every intention" to oppose merger at the Surface Transportation Board. In November 2025, the union endorsed the merger after reaching a labor agreement with Union Pacific. In December 2025, the Brotherhood of Locomotive Engineers and Trainmen (BLET) and the Brotherhood of Maintenance of Way Employees Division (BMWED) withdrew their support of the merger.

A group opposed to the merger, Stop the Rail Merger Coalition, formed in April 2026. Members of the group include BNSF, CPKC, Teamsters, American Farm Bureau Federation, and six state attorneys general.

In July 2026, 22 democratic senators signed a letter urging the STB to conduct a "rigorous review" of the merger. Senate Democratic leader Chuck Schumer condemned the merger as a "hostile takeover of America's infrastructure," warning that it could result in "dangerous consolidation and monopoly power," along with declining service, safety, and working conditions, and higher costs for shippers. Senators Tammy Baldwin (D-Wis.) and Roger Marshall (R-Kan.) have also raised concerns with the Surface Transportation Board (STB) about potential cost increases, unreliable service, and reduced competition.

A report by the American Economic Liberties Project stated that "because of the clear harms to competition and anticipated regulatory reaction, no transcontinental merger of this kind has ever been attempted—until now." Co-author of the report Erik Peinert wrote that a Union Pacific donation to the White House State Ballroom construction was "an attempt at corporate bribery".

== Market reaction ==
Following the merger announcement, Norfolk Southern's stock fell by 3%, while Union Pacific's dropped by 2.4%.

The approval process is expected to finish by early 2027.

Investors have also noted the financial risk if the merger does not move forward. The agreement includes a $2.5 billion reverse termination fee payable by Union Pacific to Norfolk Southern if the Surface Transportation Board (STB) rejects the deal or imposes conditions considered too burdensome to complete it. Such a fee underscores the potential cost to Union Pacific's investors in the event of regulatory denial, drawing comparisons to past cases such as AT&T's unsuccessful bid for T-Mobile, which resulted in a substantial termination payment.

Despite initial investor concerns, Union Pacific and Norfolk Southern have presented the merger as a compelling value proposition for shareholders. The merger terms value Norfolk Southern at $320 per share, a 25% premium over its 30-day volume-weighted average price as of July 16, 2025.

The merged company is expected to have an enterprise value of more than $250 billion and to generate about $2.75 billion in annual synergies.

Union Pacific expects the merger to increase its adjusted earnings per share (EPS) in the second full year after closing, with accretion rising to the high single digits in subsequent years. Under the merger terms, Norfolk Southern shareholders would receive one Union Pacific common share and $88.82 in cash for each share they hold, resulting in a 27% ownership stake in the combined company on a fully diluted basis and allowing them to share in future growth and synergies.

Both companies plan to suspend share repurchase programs through 2028 but intend to continue paying dividends.
