= Railroad History =

Academic journal

- Discipline: History of rail transport
- Language: English
- Edited by: Dan Cupper

Publication details
- Former names: The Railway and Locomotive Historical Society Bulletin
- History: 1921−present
- Publisher: Railway and Locomotive Historical Society
- Frequency: Biannual

Standard abbreviations
- ISO 4: Railr. Hist.

Indexing
- ISSN: 0090-7847

Links
- Journal homepage

Railroad History (initially, The Railway & Locomotive Historical Society Bulletin) is a biannual peer-reviewed academic journal published by the Railway & Locomotive Historical Society since 1921.

Railroad History consists primarily of articles about the history of rail transport with some essays and book reviews. As of 2022, its editor is Dan Cupper.

The RLHS is a non-profit organization founded in 1921 in the United States to promote research into and preservation of documentation and photography of railroad-related business, finance, labor, biography, and technology.

== History ==
The journal began publication in 1921 as The Railway & Locomotive Historical Society Bulletin. The journal's title was changed to Railroad History, starting with Volume 127 in 1972. Publication is typically twice yearly, although there have been several special issues, such as the Millennium Special (2000) between No. 181 and 182. Earlier special issues published between regular numbered issues were designated with consecutive alphabetical suffixes.
