= Union Pacific Challenger =

Class of American simple articulated 4-6-6-4 locomotives

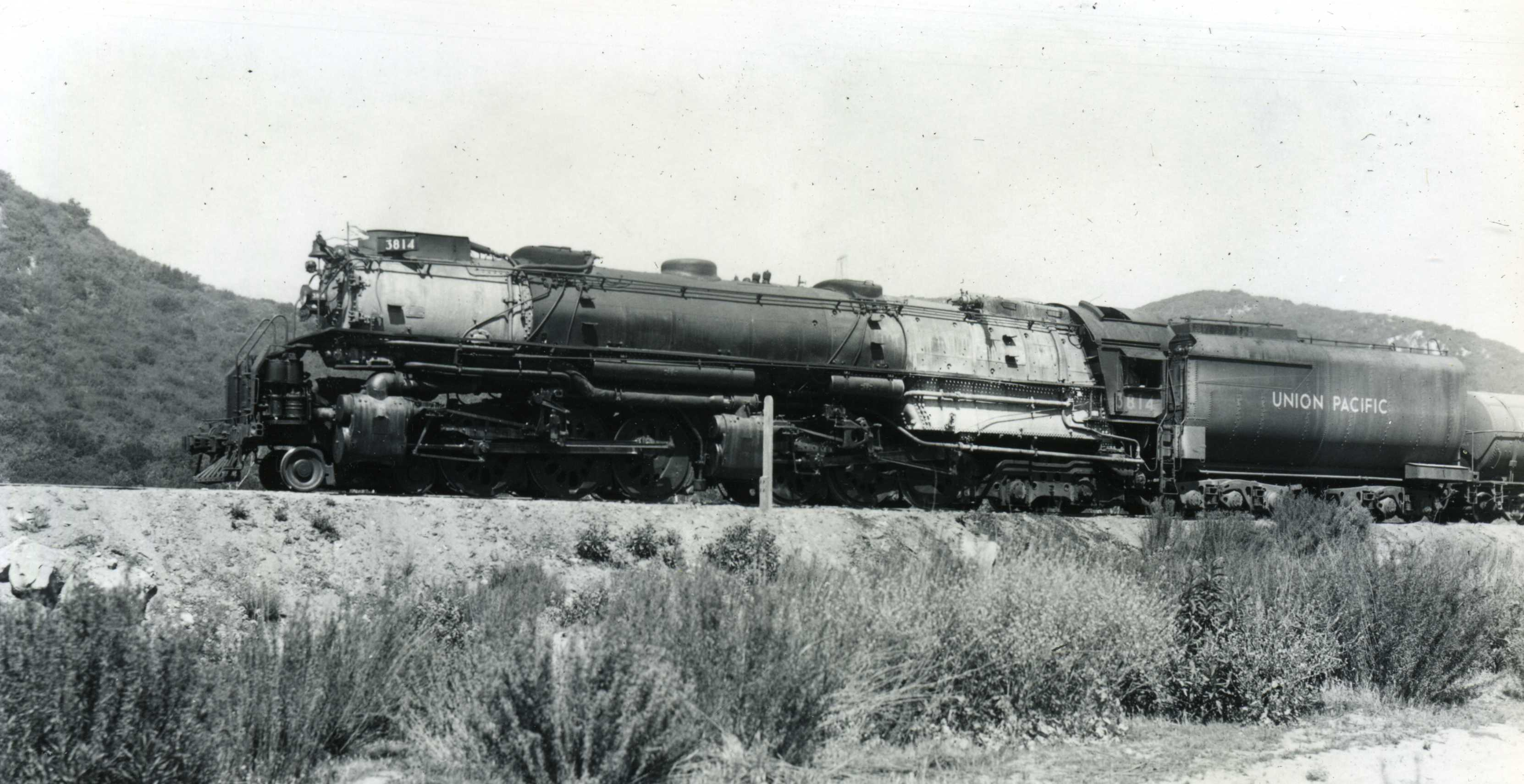
- Union Pacific 3814, one of the first challengers built for the railroad
Type and origin
- Power type: Steam
- Designer: CSA Class : Arthur H. Fetter; 4664 Class : Otto Jabelmann
- Builder: American Locomotive Company (ALCO)
- Build date: 1936–1944
- Total produced: 105 + (6 Denver & Rio Grande Western)
Specifications
- Configuration
  - Whyte: 4-6-6-4
  - UIC: (2′C)C2′ h4g
- Gauge: 4 ft 8 1/2 in (1,435 mm) standard gauge
- Driver dia.: 69 in (1,753 mm)
- Wheelbase: 60 ft 4 1/2 in (18.402 m) Engine; 121 ft 10 7/8 in (37.157 m) Engine + tender
- Adhesive weight: 4664-3/4 : 403,700 lb (183,115 kg); 4664-5 : 406,200 lb (184,249 kg); CSA-1/2 : 399,840 lb (181,364 kg)
- Loco weight: 4664-3/4 : 627,000 lb (284,000 kg); 4664-5 : 634,500 lb (287,800 kg); CSA-1/2 : 566,950 lb (257,160 kg)
- Tender weight: 4664-3/4 : 436,500 lb (198,000 kg); 4664-5 : 434,500 lb (197,086 kg); CSA-1/2 : 322,600 lb (146,329 kg)
- Total weight: 4664-3/4 : 1,063,500 lb (482,400 kg); 4664-5 : 1,069,000 lb (484,890 kg); CSA-1/2 : 889,550 lb (403,493 kg)
- Fuel type: Coal, oil
- Fuel capacity: 32 short tons (29 t; 29 long tons); 6,450 US gal (24,400 L; 5,370 imp gal) UP3985
- Water cap.: 25,000 US gal (95,000 L; 21,000 imp gal)
- Firebox
  - Grate area: 4664 Class : 132 sq ft (12 m^{2}) (grate removed in 1990); CSA-1/2 = 108.25 sq ft (10 m^{2})
- Boiler: 94 in (2,400 mm)
- Boiler pressure: 4664-3/4/5 : 280 lbf/in^{2} (1.93 MPa); CSA-1/2 : 255 lbf/in^{2} (1.76 MPa)
- Heating surface
  - Firebox: 4664-3/4 : 602 sq ft (55.9 m^{2}); 4664-5 : 602 sq ft (55.9 m^{2}); CSA-1/2 = 548 sq ft (50.9 m^{2})
  - Tubes: 527 sq ft (49.0 m^{2})
  - Flues: 3,687 sq ft (342.5 m^{2})
  - Total surface: 4,795 sq ft (445.5 m^{2})
- Superheater
  - Heating area: 2,162 sq ft (200.9 m^{2})
- Cylinders: Four
- Cylinder size: 4664-3/4/5 : 21 in × 32 in (533 mm × 813 mm); CSA-1/2 : 22 in × 32 in (559 mm × 813 mm)
- Valve gear: Walschaerts
- Valve type: Piston valves
- Loco brake: Air
- Train brakes: Air
- Couplers: Knuckle
Performance figures
- Maximum speed: 70 mph (110 km/h)
- Tractive effort: 4664-3/4/5 : 97,352 lbf (433.04 kN); CSA-1/2 : 97,305 lbf (432.83 kN)
- Factor of adh.: 4664-3/4 : 4.15; 4664-5 : 4.17; CSA-1/2 : 4.11
Career
- Operators: Union Pacific Railroad
- Class: CSA-1, CSA-2, 4664-3, 4664-4, 4664-5
- Preserved: Two (Nos. 3985 and 3977)
- Restored: No. 3985; April 1981, January 2023-Present
- Disposition: No. 3985 under restoration, No. 3977 on display, remainder scrapped

The Union Pacific Challengers are a type of simple, articulated, 4-6-6-4 steam locomotive built by American Locomotive Company (ALCO) from 1936 to 1944 and operated by the Union Pacific Railroad until the late 1950s.

In total, 105 Challengers were built in five classes. They were nearly 122 ft (37 m) long and weighed 537 short tons (487 tonnes). They operated over most of the Union Pacific system, primarily in freight service, but a few were assigned to the Portland Rose and other passenger trains. Their design and operating experience shaped the design of the Big Boy locomotive type, which in turn, shaped the design of the last three orders of Challengers.

Two Union Pacific Challengers survive. The most notable is Union Pacific No. 3985, which was restored by the Union Pacific in 1981, then operated in excursion service as part of its heritage fleet program. Mechanical problems forced it out of service in October 2010; it was retired in January 2020 after the restoration of the 4-8-8-4 Big Boy 4014 and eventually donated to the Railroading Heritage of Midwest America in 2022, where the locomotive is undergoing a second restoration. The only other surviving Challenger is UP No. 3977, which is on display in North Platte, Nebraska.

== History ==
=== Description ===
The name "Challenger" was given to steam locomotives with a 4-6-6-4 wheel arrangement, four wheels in the leading pilot truck to guide the locomotive into curves, two sets of six driving wheels, and four trailing wheels to support the rear of the engine and its massive firebox. Each set of driving wheels is driven by two steam cylinders. In essence, the result is two engines under one boiler. Union Pacific developed five types of Challengers - the "light" CSA-1 and CSA-2 classes and the "heavy" 4664–3, 4664–4, and 4664-5 classes.

The railroad sought powerful locomotives that could handle mountain grades at high speeds. Previously, articulated locomotives had been limited to slow speeds by their design. Technical breakthroughs allowed the UP Challengers to operate with 280 lbf/in^{2} (1.93 MPa) boiler pressure, something usually reserved for passenger locomotives like the FEF Series. They had 69-inch (1,800 mm) drivers, mammoth wheels usually seen on passenger locomotives only because freight engines normally require the leverage provided by smaller wheels. Speeds in excess of 60 miles per hour (100 km/h), while unheard-of on most other railroads using articulated steam locomotives, became commonplace on the Union Pacific.

When the first Challengers entered service in 1936, on the UP's main line over the Wasatch Range between Green River and Ogden, the locomotives had problems climbing the steep grades. For most of the route, the maximum grade is 0.82% in either direction, but the climb eastward from Ogden, into the Wasatch Range, reached 1.14%. Hauling a 3,600-short-ton (3,300 t; 3,200-long-ton) freight train demanded double heading and helper operations, and adding and removing helper engines slowed operations. Those limitations prompted the introduction of the Big Boy in 1941, as well as a redesign of the last three orders from 1942 to 1944.

Using the experience from the Big Boy, UP chief mechanical engineer Otto Jabelmann redesigned the last three orders of Challengers in 1941. The result was a locomotive in working order weighing some 317 short tons (288 t; 283 long tons) accompanied by a tender weighing 174 short tons (158 t; 155 long tons) when two-thirds loaded. Calculated tractive effort is 97,350 lbf (433.0 kN). From 1941, the Challengers were intended to speed up freight operations on the grades across Wyoming; the Wasatch Range climb east from Ogden was taken over by unassisted Big Boys.

=== Construction ===
The 105 locomotives were ordered in five batches; the first two were light Challengers, and the final three were heavy Challengers. The Challengers, along with the Big Boys, were introduced just as traffic was surging in preparation for American entry to World War II.

Table of orders and numbers
Class	Quantity	Manufacturer	Serial numbers	Year built	UP number	Notes
CSA-1	15	ALCO	68745–68759	1936	3900–3914	Converted to oil fuel in 1941–43, renumbered 3800–3814 in 1944, all were scrapped between 1957 and 1958
CSA-2	25	ALCO	68924–68948	1937	3915–3939	Converted to oil fuel, renumbered 3815–3839 in 1944, all were scrapped in 1958
4664-3	20	ALCO	69760–69779	1942	3950–3969	3968 converted to oil fuel in 1946, renumbered 3944 in 1946; 3967 hauled an excursion train for the Rocky Mountain Railroad Club from Denver, Colorado to Laramie, Wyoming on May 17, 1953. All were scrapped between 1958 and 1959.
4664-4	31	ALCO	70158–70162; 70169–70182; 70678–70683	1943	3975–3999	31 built, but only 25 delivered to UP (see below); 3975–3984 converted to oil fuel in 1945; renumbered 3708–3717 in 1952; No. 3985 in excursion service from 1981 to 2010; 3977 preserved and on static display, remainder scrapped in 1957
4664-5	20	ALCO	72792–72811	1944	3930–3949	3930/31/32/34/37/38/43/44 converted to oil fuel in 1952 and renumbered 3700–3707; all were scrapped between 1957 and 1959.

As part of Union Pacific's fourth order in 1943, ALCO built 32 locomotives for Union Pacific using the same specifications. However, the War Production Board diverted six locomotives after completion to the Denver and Rio Grande Western Railroad via a lease through the War Department's Defense Plant Corporation. Locomotives 3900-3905 formed the Rio Grande's Class L-97. These were later sold to Clinchfield Railroad in 1947 and were renumbered as 670–675, where they formed the Clinchfield's Class E-3; these six Challengers were eventually retired in 1953.

== Preservation ==
Only two Challengers survive, both from the 4664-4 order built in 1943. No. 3977 is on static display in North Platte, Nebraska. No. 3985 was restored to operating condition by Union Pacific in 1981 and used in excursion service until mechanical problems sent it back into storage in October 2010. It was officially retired in January 2020 and stored in Cheyenne, Wyoming, but has since been donated to the Railroading Heritage of Midwest America (RRHMA) in Little Silvis Shops in Silvis, Illinois, where the locomotive is now being restored to operation once again.

Surviving Challenger locomotives
Type	Number	Image	Date built	Serial number	Location	Coordinates	Notes
4664-4	3977		June 1943	70160	Cody Park, North Platte, Nebraska	41.147853°N 100.753113°W	Was renumbered to 3710 in 1952.
4664-4	3985		July 1943	70174	Railroading Heritage of Midwest America, Silvis, Illinois	41.512929°N 90.402646°W	No. 3985 was restored in 1981 and used by Union Pacific on excursions until October 14, 2010, when mechanical problems forced it from service. It was officially retired from UP excursion service in January 2020. In April 2022, Union Pacific donated No. 3985 to the RRHMA and sent it to the RRHMA's workshops in Silvis, Illinois, in November of that year. Restoration work began in January 2023.

== See also ==
- Union Pacific FEF series
- Norfolk and Western Class A
- Chesapeake and Ohio class H-8

== Bibliography ==
- Drury, George (2015). Guide to North American Steam Locomotives (2nd ed.). Kalmbach Publishing. ISBN 978-1-62700-259-2.
- Solomon, Brian (2009). Alco Locomotives (1st ed.). Voyageur Press. ISBN 978-0-7603-3338-9.
- Wright, Roy (1942). American Engineer and Railroad Journal - Volume 116. Simmons-Boardman Publishing Corporation.
