= Union Pacific 3985 =

Preserved Union Pacific steam locomotive

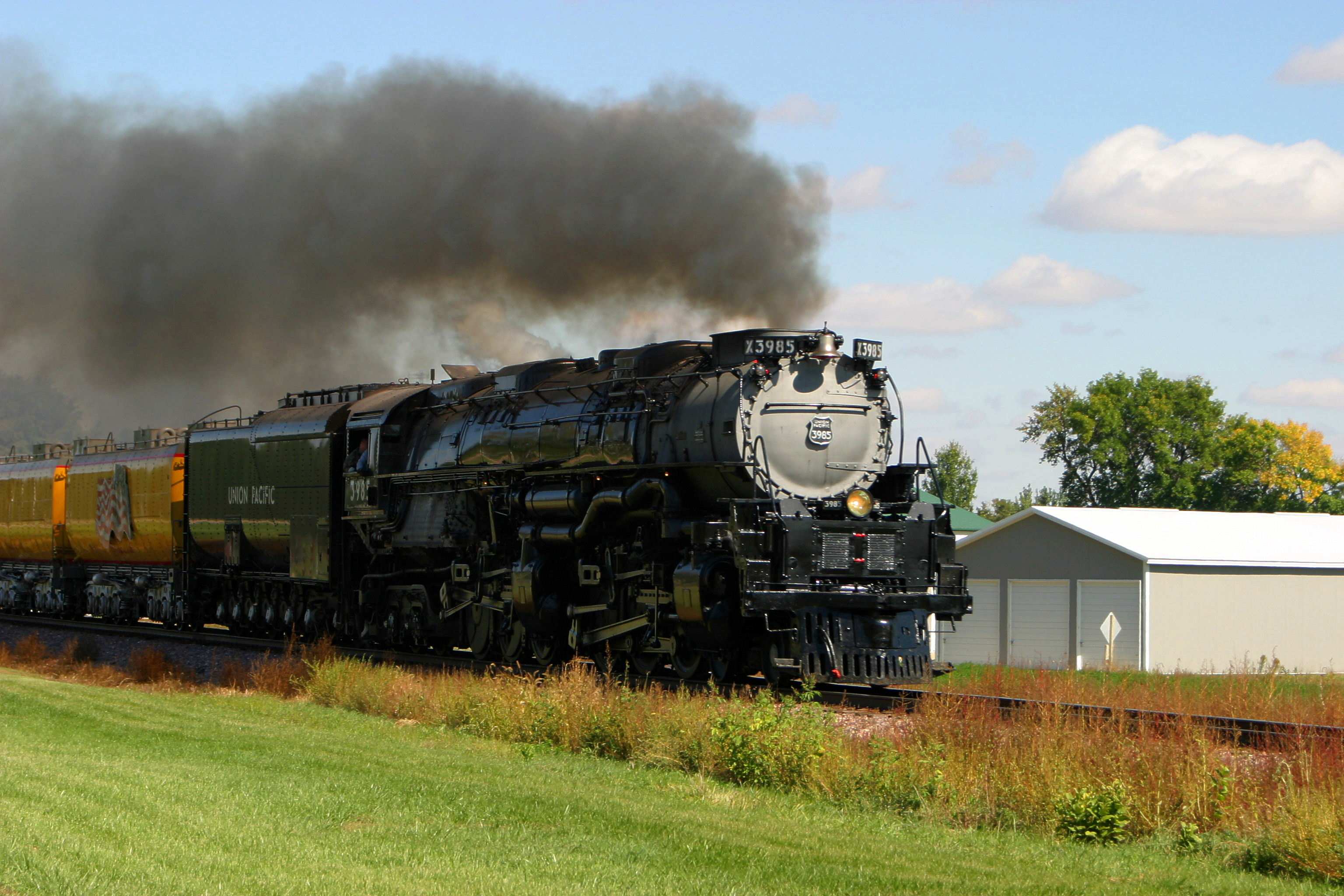
- Union Pacific No. 3985 runs through Alton, Iowa, on October 1, 2008
Type and origin
- Power type: Steam
- Builder: American Locomotive Company
- Serial number: 70174
- Build date: July 1943
Specifications
- Configuration
  - Whyte: 4-6-6-4
  - UIC: (2′C) C2′ h4
- Gauge: 4 ft 8 1/2 in (1,435 mm) standard gauge
- Driver dia.: 69 in (1,753 mm)
- Wheelbase: 60 ft 4 1/2 in (18.402 m) Engine; 121 ft 10 7/8 in (37.157 m) Engine + tender
- Axle load: 67,333 lb (30,542 kilograms; 30.542 metric tons)
- Adhesive weight: 404,000 lb (183,000 kg; 183 t)
- Loco weight: 627,900 lb (284,800 kg)
- Tender weight: 446,000 lb (202,000 kg)
- Total weight: 1,073,900 lb (487,100 kg)
- Tender type: 25-C
- Fuel type: New: Coal; Now: No. 5 fuel oil
- Fuel capacity: Coal: 32 short tons (29 t; 29 long tons); Oil: 6,450 US gal (24,400 L; 5,370 imp gal)
- Water cap.: 25,000 US gal (95,000 L; 21,000 imp gal)
- Firebox
  - Grate area: 132 sq ft (12 m^{2}) (grate removed in 1990)
- Boiler: 94 in (2,400 mm)
- Boiler pressure: 280 lbf/in^{2} (1.93 MPa)
- Heating surface
  - Firebox: 140 sq ft (13 m^{2})
  - Tubes: 527 sq ft (49.0 m^{2})
  - Flues: 3,687 sq ft (342.5 m^{2})
  - Total surface: 4,795 sq ft (445.5 m^{2})
- Superheater
  - Type: Type E
  - Heating area: 2,162 sq ft (200.9 m^{2})
- Cylinders: Four, outside
- Cylinder size: 21 in × 32 in (533 mm × 813 mm)
- Valve gear: Walschaerts
- Valve type: Piston valves
- Loco brake: Air
- Train brakes: Air
- Couplers: Knuckle
Performance figures
- Maximum speed: 70 mph (110 km/h)
- Power output: 5,000 hp (3,700 kW)
- Tractive effort: 97,350 lbf (433.03 kN)
- Factor of adh.: 4.15
Career
- Operators: Union Pacific Railroad
- Class: 4664-4
- Number in class: 11 of 25
- Numbers: UP 3985; CRR 676
- Nicknames: The Challenger
- Delivered: 1943
- First run: 1943 (revenue service); May 1981 (1st excursion service)
- Last run: 1957 (revenue service); October 14, 2010 (1st excursion service)
- Retired: 1962 (revenue service); January 2020 (1st excursion service)
- Restored: March 1981 (1st excursion service)
- Current owner: Railroading Heritage of Midwest America
- Disposition: Undergoing restoration to operating condition

Union Pacific 3985 is a four-cylinder articulated 4-6-6-4 "Challenger" type steam locomotive, built in July 1943 by the American Locomotive Company (ALCO) of Schenectady, New York, for the Union Pacific Railroad. No. 3985 is one of only two Challengers still in existence and the only one to have operated in excursion service.

No. 3985 operated in revenue service until 1957. It was then stored in the roundhouse in Cheyenne, Wyoming, until 1975, when it was placed outdoors beside the Cheyenne depot. In March 1981, after a group of Union Pacific employees restored the locomotive to operating condition, it was placed into excursion service as part of the Union Pacific's heritage fleet and became the world's largest operational steam locomotive. Mechanical problems took it offline in 2010, after which it was stored at the Union Pacific's Steam Shops in Cheyenne.

In May 2019, the title of largest operational steam locomotive passed to the newly restored 4-8-8-4 "Big Boy" Union Pacific 4014. No. 3985, still in poor mechanical condition, was retired from excursion service in January 2020. In April 2022, UP officials announced that the company would donate the locomotive to the Railroading Heritage of Midwest America (RRHMA), which is now restoring the locomotive to operating condition.

== History ==
=== Design ===
Designed by UP chief mechanical engineer Otto Jabelmann in 1941, UP 3985 was part of the second order of this second version of the Challenger. The design drew on recent experience with the enormous 4-8-8-4 Big Boy locomotives, and resulted in a locomotive in that in working order weighed some 317 short tons (288 t; 283 long tons) accompanied by a tender that weighed 174 short tons (158 t; 155 long tons) when two-thirds loaded. Calculated tractive effort is 97,350 lbf (433.0 kN). The Challenger class was intended to speed freight operations on the 0.82% grades across Wyoming, while the 1.14% Wasatch Range climb east from Ogden was to be conquered by the Big Boys without helpers. The Challengers and Big Boys arrived on the scene just as traffic was surging in preparation for American participation in World War II.

=== Revenue service and retirement (1943–1957) ===
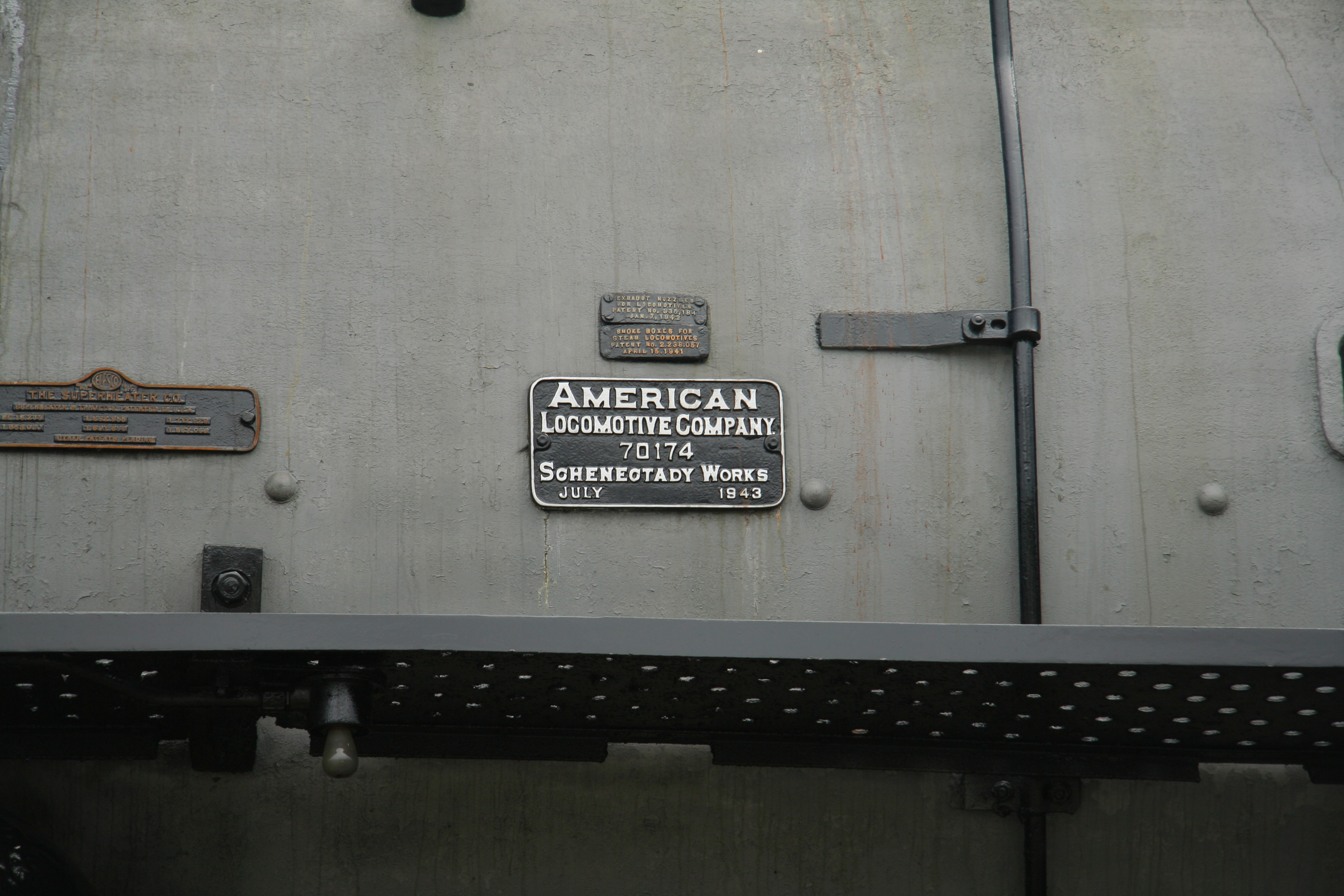
UP No. 3985's builder's plate

No. 3985 was part of the 4664-4 group of Challengers built in 1943. Although this group consisted of 31 locomotives, only 25 went to the Union Pacific. It operated in its last revenue train service in 1957, and the locomotive was officially retired in 1962. The following year, No. 3985 was repainted and put on display in Cheyenne, Wyoming, for the 1963 National Railway Historical Society (NRHS) Convention alongside Big Boy No. 4023 and 4-8-4 "Northern" No. 844, which had been in excursion service since 1960. After the convention, the locomotive was stored inside the UP's Cheyenne roundhouse along with No. 4023. In 1975, No. 3985 was placed on outdoor display beside the Cheyenne depot.

=== First restoration and excursion career with UP (1981–2010) ===
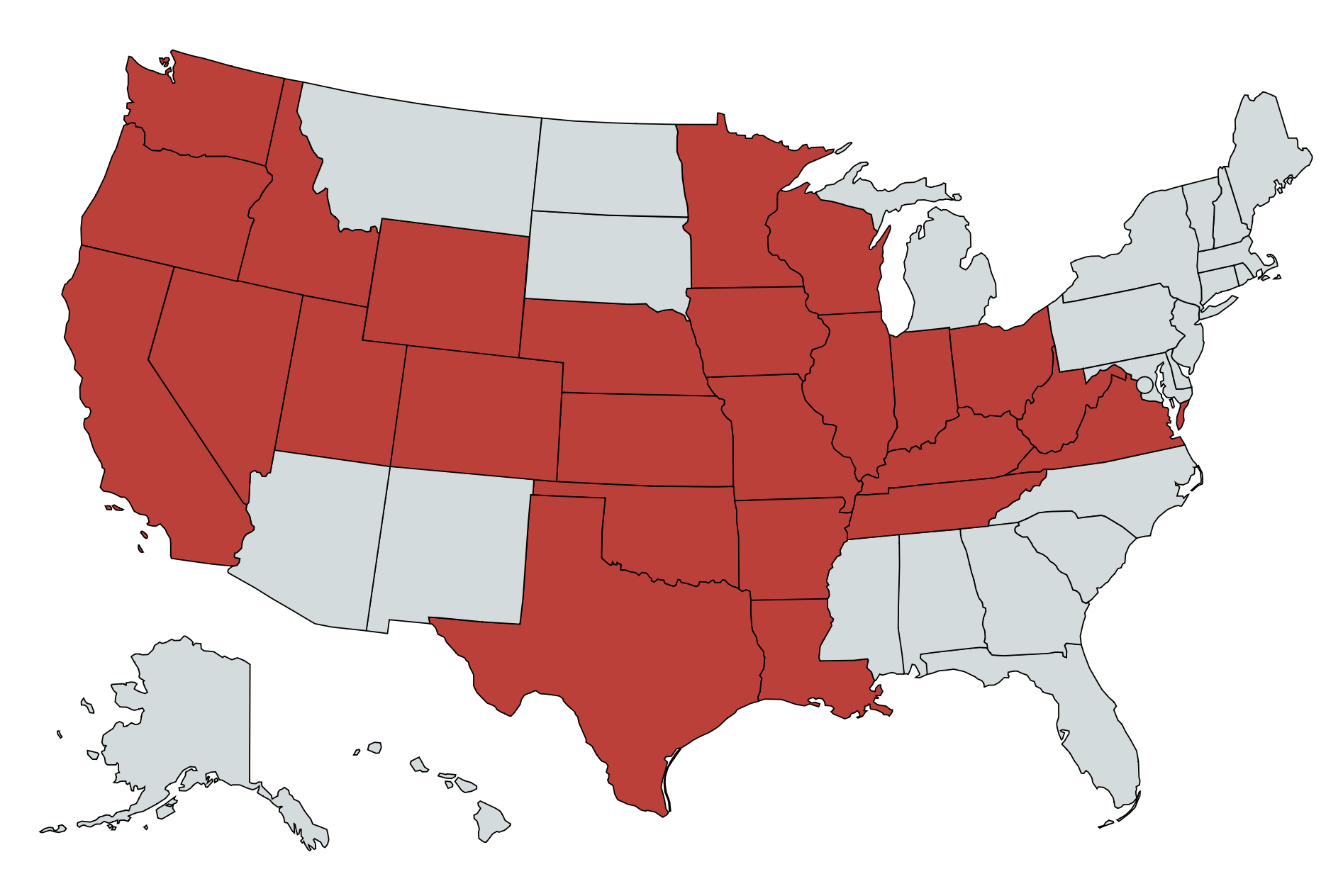
US states visited by No. 3985 in excursion service

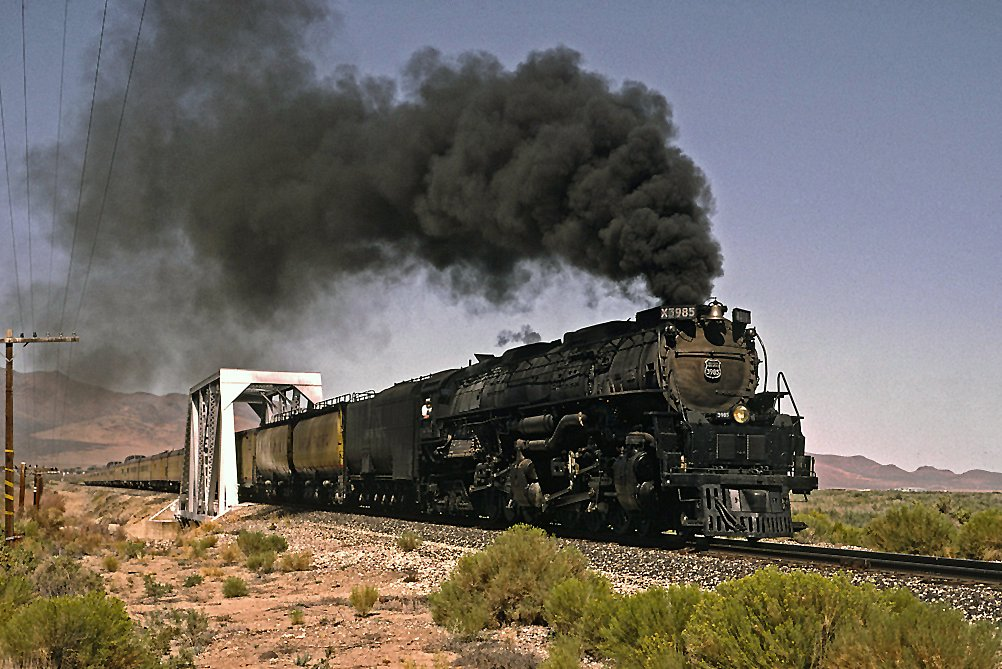
No. 3985 pulls an excursion through Golconda, Nevada, in July 1992.

From 1979 to 1981, Union Pacific employee-volunteers worked to restore the locomotive to operating condition. The locomotive made its first excursion run in May during Railfair 1981, where it attended the opening of the California State Railroad Museum in Sacramento, along with No. 844.

No. 3985, originally built to burn coal, was converted to burn No. 5 fuel oil in 1990 to reduce maintenance stops during excursion trips. That year, the locomotive pulled a 143-car doublestack train from Cheyenne and North Platte, Nebraska, per special request by American President Lines.

In 1991, No. 3985 went to Railfair 1991 along with No. 844 and DDA40X No. 6936. The excursion also included UP 4-6-0 No. 1243 on a flatbed. The next year, the 3985 went to the National Railroad Historical Society's convention in San Jose, California. It participated in activities with Southern Pacific 4-8-4 No. 4449 and SP 4-6-2 No. 2472.

In November 1992, the locomotive pulled the Clinchfield Santa Train, an excursion that ran on CSX's Clinchfield tracks, masquerading as Clinchfield No. 676. The number alluded to the CRR's E-3 locomotives, which were numbered 670 to 675.

In May 1993, the locomotive drew the 40th-anniversary Rocky Mountain Railroad Club excursion. The locomotive masqueraded first as sister engine No. 3967, which pulled the excursion on May 17, 1953; then was renumbered midrun as 3718, alluding to the 4664-4 locomotives, Nos. 3708–3717, that were converted to run on oil in 1945.

In July, No. 3985 travelled from Cheyenne to Omaha, Nebraska, the locomotive picked up an excursion to Chicago, Illinois, for the 1993 NRHS Convention and its first post-restoration visit to the city. No. 3985 tiptoed through the Sedalia Subdivision in Missouri, one of several UP routes affected by the year's Great Flood. After the convention, the locomotive traveled to Kansas City, where a shortage of locomotives led UP to use No. 3985 to pull freight trains around the area before it returned to Cheyenne in August.

In May 1994, No. 3985 pulled an excursion on California's Cajon Pass with the Union Pacific's A-B-A set of EMD E9 units during its 1994 tour. In 1999, the 3985 double-headed with FEF-3 No. 844 on the way to Railfair 1999. Afterwards, the 3985 pulled the return trip, including the 844 dead in tow, which had suffered a tube failure while on display on June 24 .

Throughout its career, No. 3985 was stationed and serviced at Cheyenne, along with other equipment in the UP's heritage collection. It remained in the UP's maintenance shop in 2007 and underwent repairs in 2008.

In September and October of 2010, No. 3985 embarked on the Missouri River Eagle Tour, which would become its last tour in excursion service with the Union Pacific. As part of the tour, the locomotive pulled the Ringling Brothers and Barnum & Bailey Circus train from Cheyenne to Denver, Colorado, where the circus held a special performance to celebrate P.T. Barnum's birthday. No. 3985 made its final run with the UP on October 14, 2010, then was taken out of service for repairs and placed into storage.

In December 2018, Union Pacific asked the Federal Railroad Administration (FRA) for waivers to exempt Nos. 3985, 844 and 4014 from federal Positive Train Control (PTC) requirements; in February 2019, the FRA officials responded that such waivers were not needed. Two years later, in January 2020, Union Pacific retired No. 3985 from excursion service. The UP steam program manager, Ed Dickens, said maintaining three steam locomotives was too much for the team to handle. No. 3985 also needed an extensive overhaul due to its poor mechanical condition. No. 4014 replaced No. 3985 in excursion service. In 2019, No. 3985's original tender, No. 25-C-311, had been connected to No. 4014 to help meet the Big Boy's restoration deadline.

=== Acquisition by RRHMA and second restoration (2022–present) ===
On April 28, 2022, Union Pacific announced it would donate No. 3985—along with 2-10-2 No. 5511, Centennial No. 6936, an unpowered E9 locomotive, and other rolling stock from their heritage fleet—to the Railroading Heritage of Midwest America (RRHMA) in Silvis, Illinois. RRHMA aims to restore the Nos. 3985 and 5511 steam locomotives to operating condition. On May 13, 2022, RRHMA launched a fundraiser to raise money for the work. That November, UP moved 3985 and the rest of the donated equipment to the RRHMA's shop. The restoration of both No. 3985 and No. 5511 began in January 2023.

As part of the restoration, RRHMA plans to rebuild No. 4014's original tender, No. 25-C-116, to carry fuel oil instead of coal, then reunite it with No. 4014 and return the No. 25-C-311 tender to No. 3985.

== Bibliography ==
- Drury, George H. (2015). Guide to North American Steam Locomotives (2nd ed.). Kalmbach Publishing. ISBN 978-1-62700-259-2.
- Solomon, Brian (2009). Alco Locomotives (1st ed.). Voyageur Press. ISBN 978-0-7603-3338-9.
