= Union Pacific heritage fleet =

Historic rolling stock of the Union Pacific Railroad

The Union Pacific heritage fleet is a set of commemorative and historic equipment owned by the Union Pacific Railroad. As of 2025, the includes two steam locomotives, three historic diesel locomotives, 17 modern diesel locomotives in historic or commemorative paint schemes, and nearly four dozen passenger cars used for office car specials and excursion trains.

== Steam locomotives ==
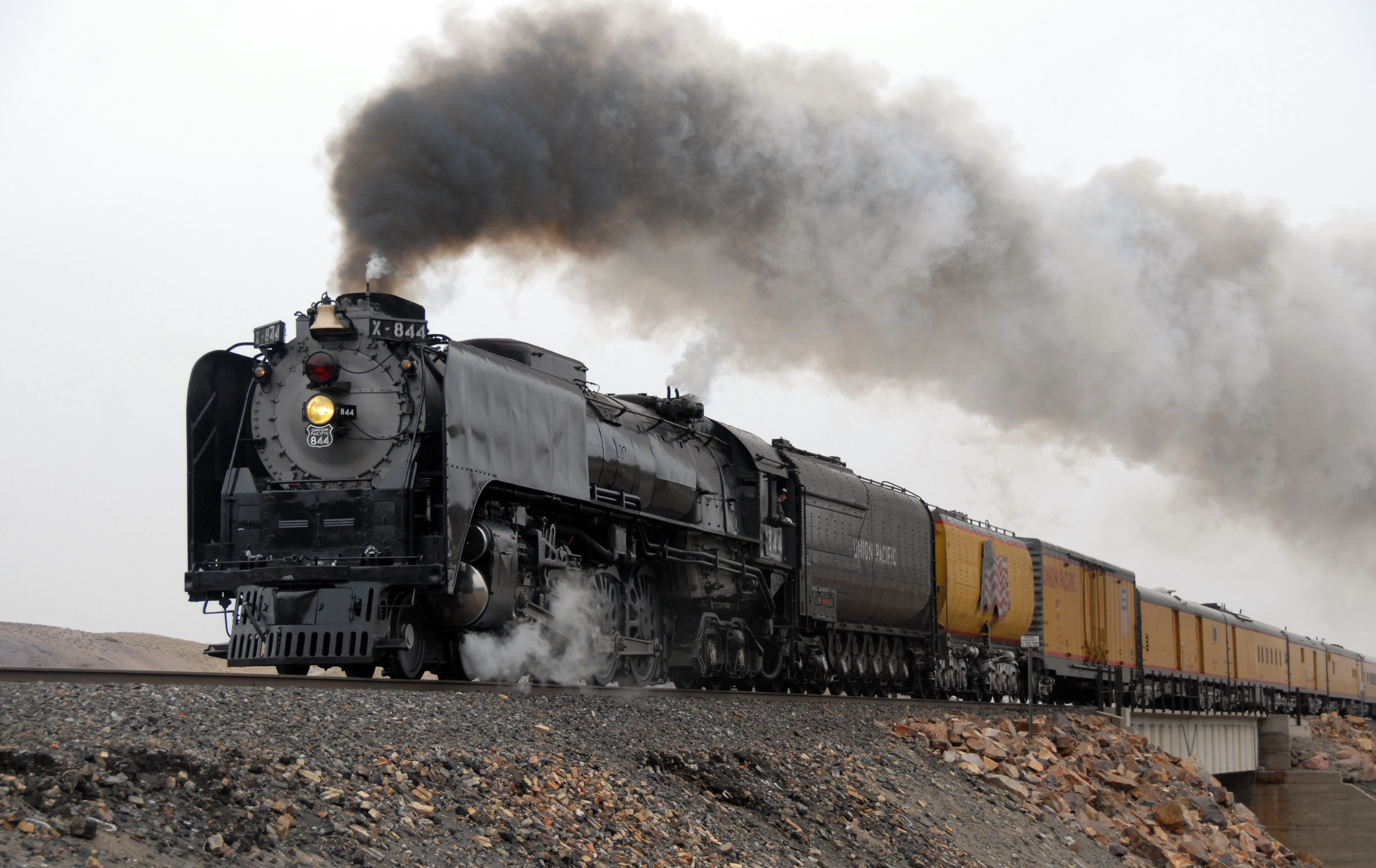
UP 844, the only steam locomotive to never be officially retired from a North American Class I railroad.

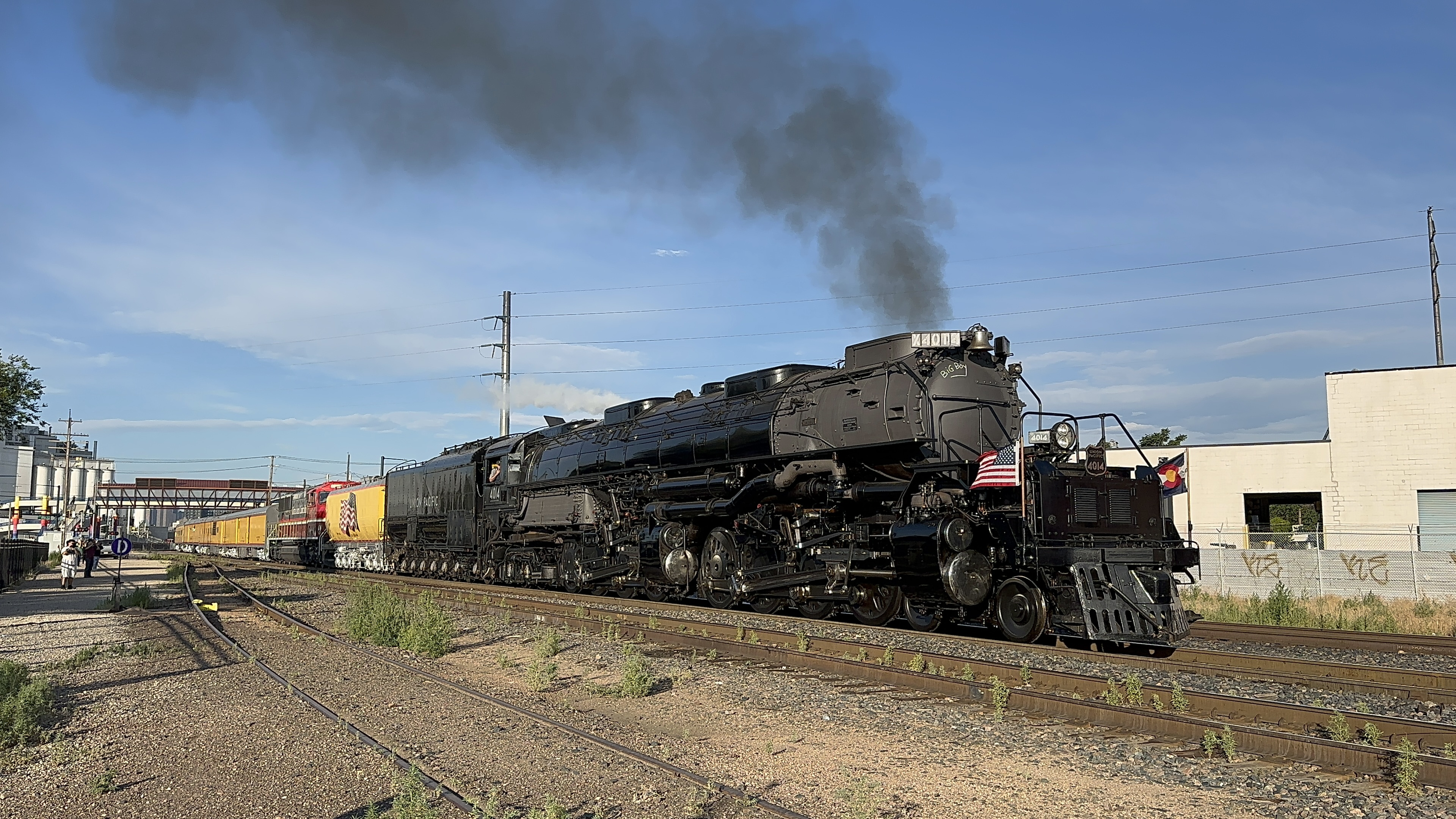
UP Big Boy 4014, the world's largest operating steam locomotive.

Since 1960, the Union Pacific has operated steam locomotives on a variety of excursions. These include:

- UP 844: a 4-8-4 Northern type express passenger steam locomotive (class FEF-3), operated in excursion service since 1960. It was the last steam locomotive built for UP and has been in continuous service since its 1944 delivery. Many people know the engine as the No. 8444, since an extra '4' was added to its number in 1962 to distinguish it from a diesel numbered in the 800 series. It regained its original number in June 1989, after the diesel was retired and donated to the Nevada Southern Railroad Museum in Boulder City, Nevada. A mechanical failure occurred on June 24, 1999, in which the boiler tubes from the 1996 overhaul, being made of the wrong material, collapsed inside the boiler and put the steam locomotive out of commission. The UP steam crew repaired it and returned it to service on November 10, 2004. It was rebuilt again in 2015 and returned to service in 2016. In addition to being one of UP's oldest locomotives, it is the only steam locomotive to never be officially retired from a North American Class I railroad.
- UP 4014: a 4-8-8-4 Big Boy class freight steam locomotive, began operating in excursion service in 2019. It is the largest operational steam locomotive in the world. Delivered in 1941, the locomotive operated in revenue service until 1959, when it was placed in storage. In 1961, No. 4014 was donated to the RailGiants Train Museum in Pomona, California, where it became one of the eight Big Boys preserved around the United States. UP reacquired the locomotive in 2013 and the following year moved it to Cheyenne, Wyoming, where it was restored over the next five years. In May 2019, No. 4014 returned to operation in excursion service.

== Historic diesel locomotives ==
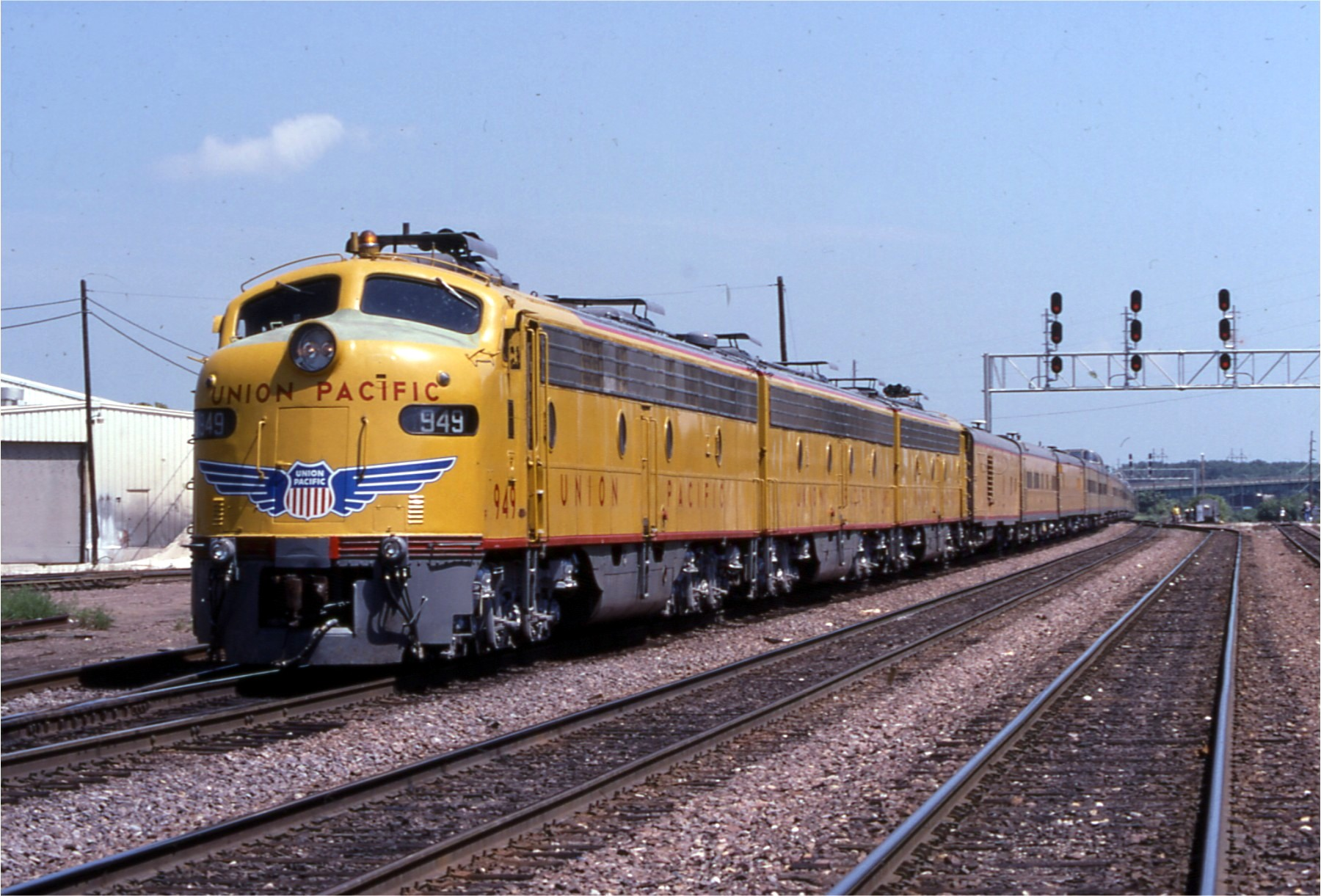
UP Nos. 949, 951 and 963B, a trio of vintage E9 streamlined diesel locomotives, pulling an excursion through Clinton, Iowa in August 1995.

UP 949, 951 and 963B are a trio of streamlined General Motors Electro-Motive Division E9 passenger locomotives built in 1955. They are used to haul the UP business cars during excursions and charter specials. Originally built in 1955, the original twin 1,200-hp 12-cylinder 567 series engines have been replaced with single EMD 16-645E 2000 hp (1.5 MW) engines and the electrical and control equipment similarly upgraded, making them more compatible with more modern locomotives. The set is made of two A units and one B unit, the latter which contains an HEP engine-generator set for powering passenger cars. They are painted in a historic paint scheme that Union Pacific Streamliners wore on such trains as the City of San Francisco and the City of Los Angeles. The two A units have been modified to eliminate the nose doors to increase safety in a collision.

UP 951 has carried its original number since its entry into service. UP 949 was built with its current number, but later was sent to the Chicago and North Western Railway and Regional Transportation Authority as CNW/RTA #511 before being reacquired by the UP. UP 963B was built as UP E9B 970B and served as a heater car on Amtrak upon its formation before being reacquired by the UP.

The locomotives last ran in 2017. Since then, they have remained stored in the roundhouse at Cheyenne, WY.

== Heritage paint schemes ==
Six EMD SD70ACe locomotives are painted in the liveries of railroads acquired by Union Pacific. The company says the locomotives "pay homage to those railroads and the generations of men and women who helped to build a great nation and the foundation for our future".

- UP 1982: honors the Missouri Pacific Railroad, which became part of Union Pacific in 1982. Electro-Motive Diesel (EMD) delivered the locomotive on May 29, 2005. The locomotive was unveiled together with No. 1983 in a private ceremony on July 30, 2005, in Omaha, Nebraska, after which it entered regular revenue service.

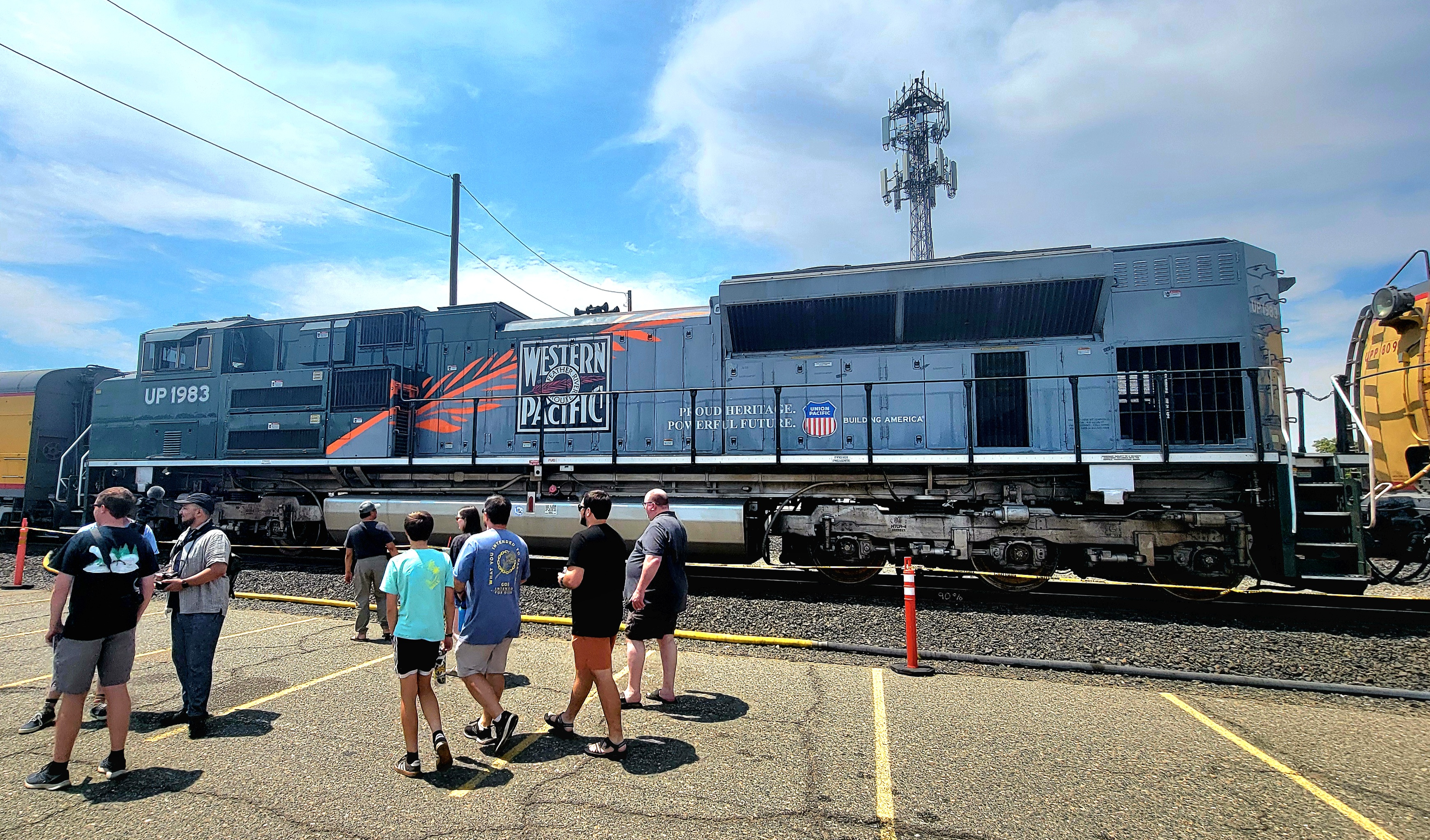
Union Pacific 1983 in Roseville, California in 2024

- UP 1983: honors the Western Pacific Railroad, which became part of Union Pacific in 1983. It was delivered on June 6, 2005, and unveiled along with No. 1982 in a private ceremony on July 30, 2005, in Omaha, Nebraska, after which it entered regular revenue service.
- UP 1988: honors the Missouri–Kansas–Texas Railroad ("the Katy"), which became part of Union Pacific in 1988. Delivered on June 15, 2005, it was unveiled in early August 2005, after which it entered regular revenue service on August 4, pulling a train from Chicago to East St. Louis, Illinois.
- UP 1989: honors the Denver and Rio Grande Western Railroad, which became part of the Southern Pacific in 1988. Delivered on May 24, 2006, unveiled on June 17, 2006, at a special UP employee event in Denver, Colorado. It also refers to the people who "went everywhere the hard way.
- UP 1995: honors the Chicago and North Western Transportation Company (CNW), which became a part of Union Pacific in 1995. The locomotive, painted at the Horicon, Wisconsin, shops of Wisconsin and Southern Railroad, was unveiled at a private ceremony for UP's ex-CNW employees at Proviso Rail Yard in suburban Chicago on July 15, 2006, before being publicly displayed at North Western Station (CNW's former station) in Chicago. After its unveiling, the locomotive pulled a freight train from Proviso to Council Bluffs, Iowa, in conjunction with Nos. 8646 and 8701 (a set of GE Dash 9-44CW locomotives at the time still in CNW paint). The 1995 then entered regular revenue service.
- UP 1996: honors the Southern Pacific Transportation Company, which became a part of Union Pacific in 1996. It was unveiled on August 19, 2006, in a ceremony that also featured Southern Pacific 6051, a Daylight-painted EMD E9 locomotive that is preserved at the California State Railroad Museum. UP 1996's road number was previously held by an EMD SD40-2, which was repainted and renumbered for the 1996 Olympics. On January 26, 2014, No. 1996 helped move "Big Boy" locomotive No. 4014 from the Los Angeles County Fairplex in Pomona, California, to West Colton, California.
Union Pacific heritage units

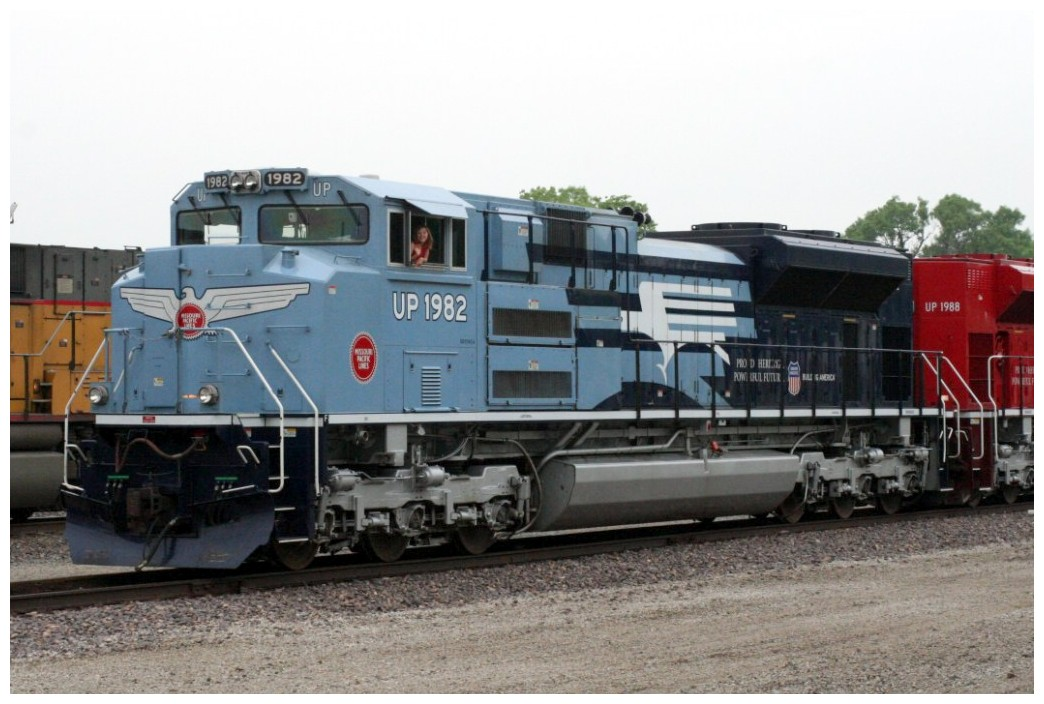
UP 1982, which honors the Missouri Pacific Railroad

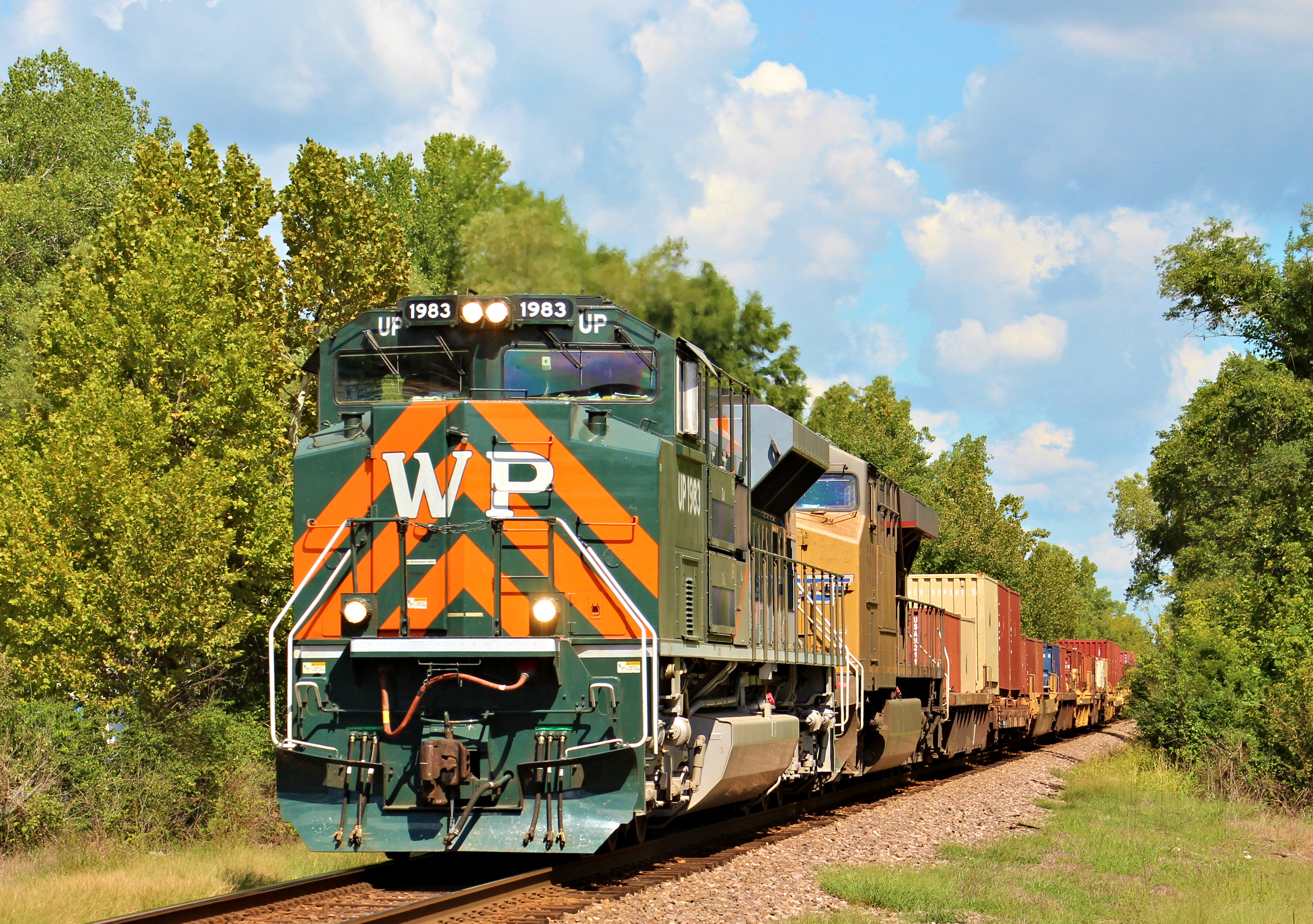
UP 1983, which honors the Western Pacific Railroad

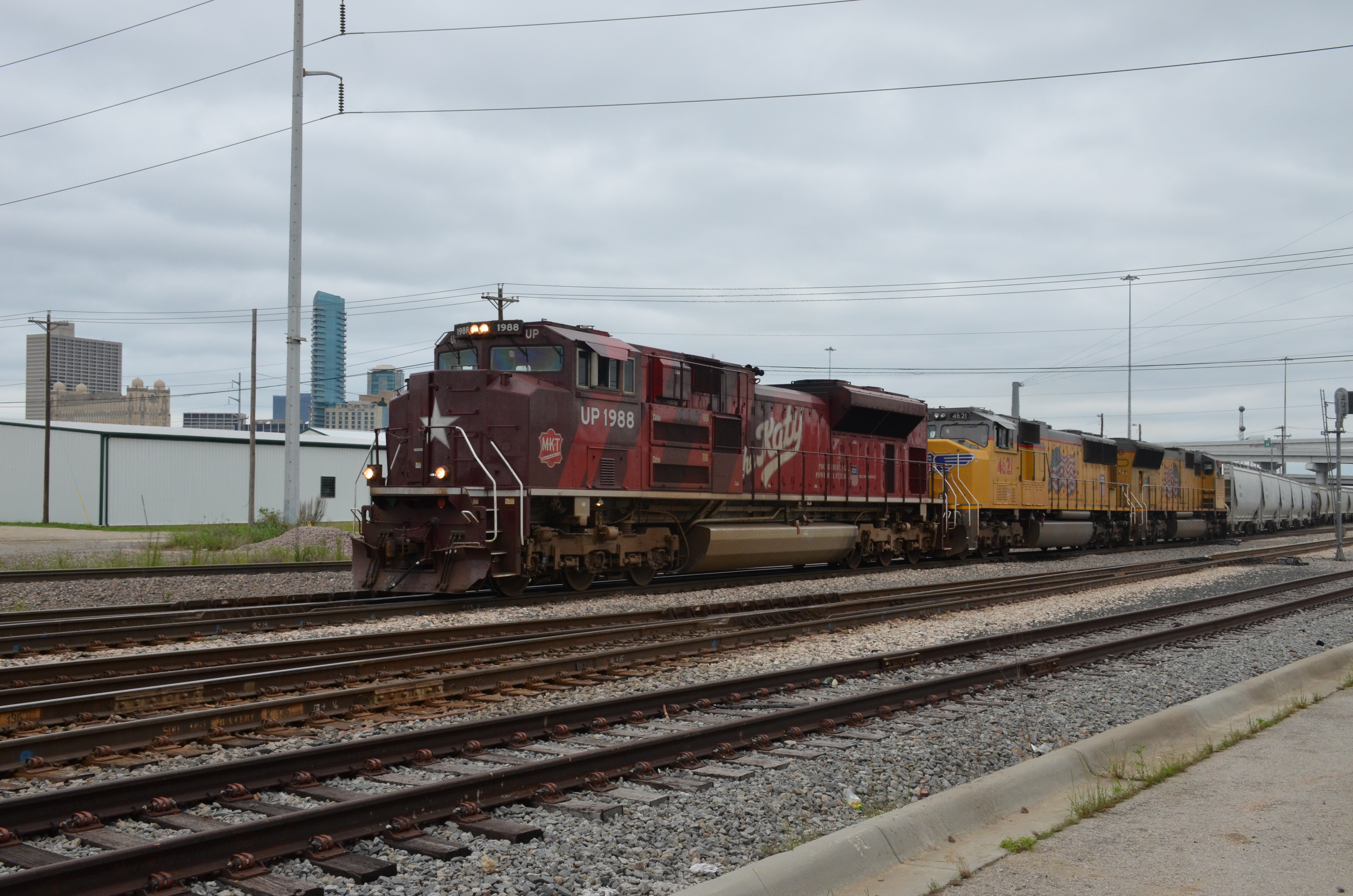
UP 1988, which honors the Missouri–Kansas–Texas Railroad ("the Katy")

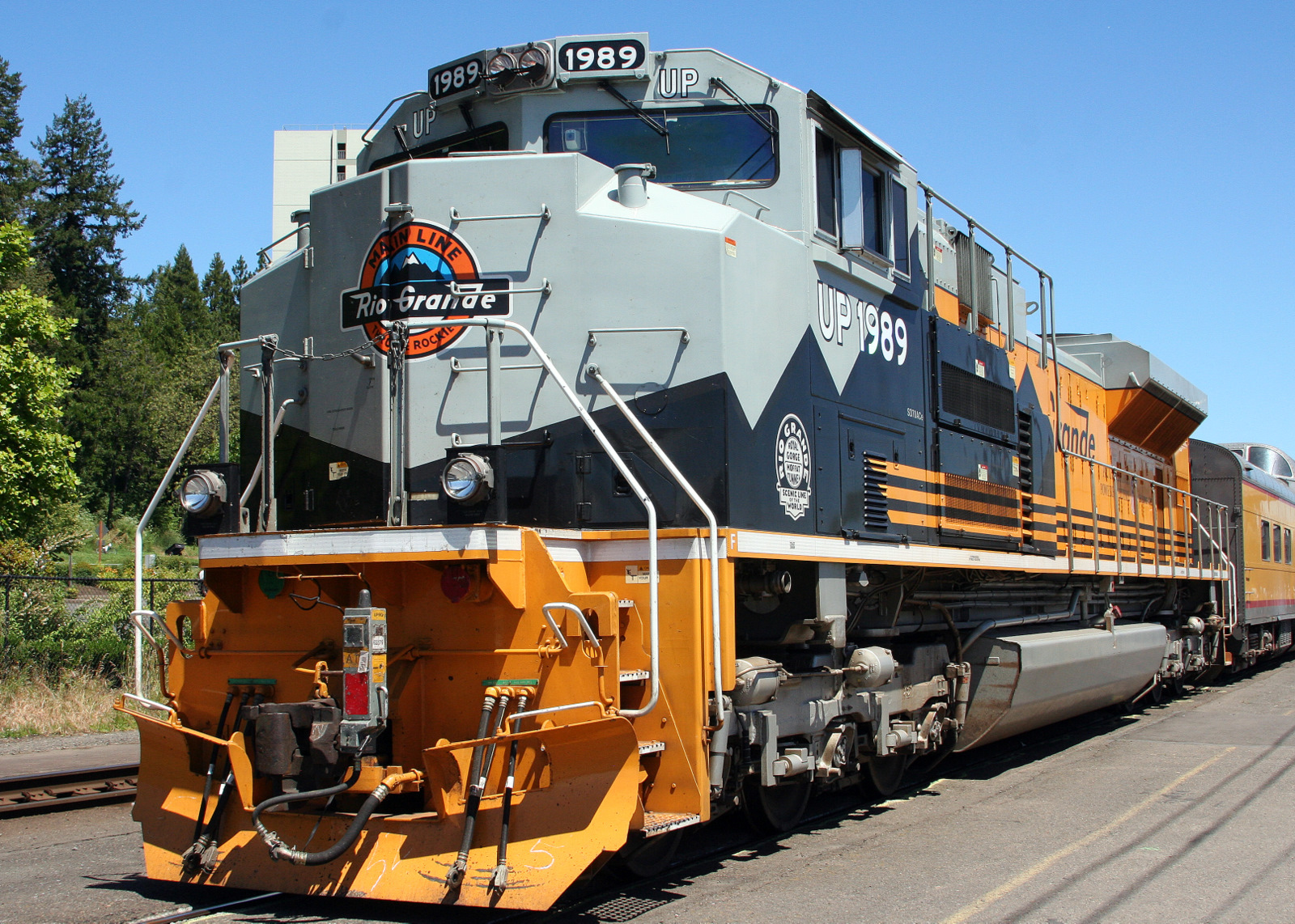
UP 1989, which honors the Denver and Rio Grande Western Railroad

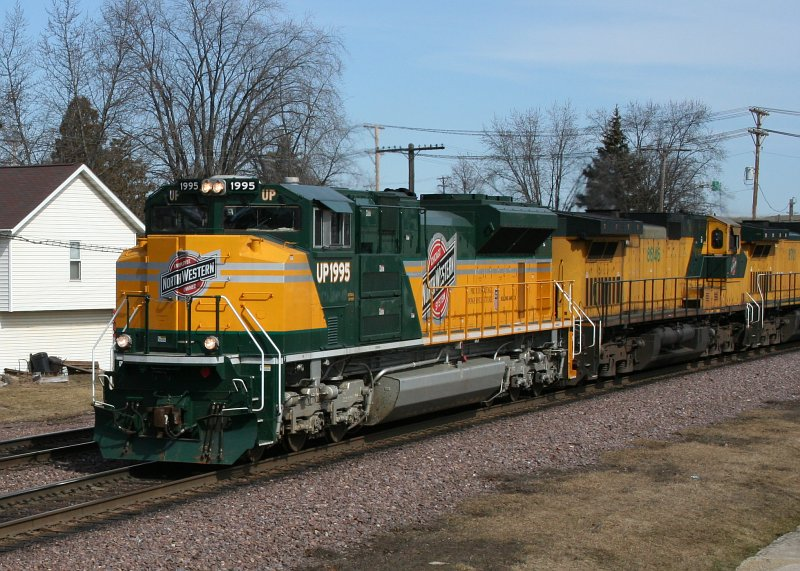
UP 1995, which honors the Chicago and North Western Railway

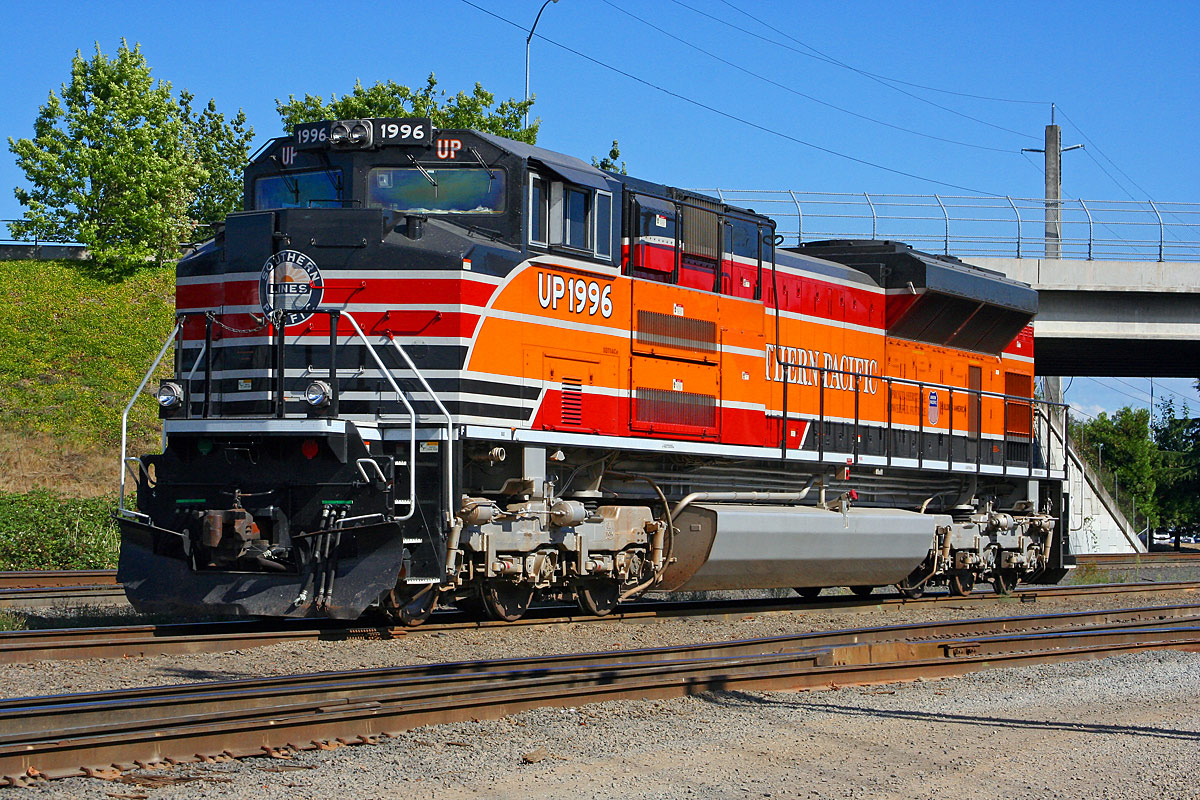
UP 1996, which honors the Southern Pacific Transportation Company

== Community service paint schemes ==
Eight locomotives are painted to honor various people, organizations, and sports events:

- UP 1111: an EMD SD70ACe locomotive painted to honor the employees of the Union Pacific Railroad. It wears the words "Powered by our People" just under the windows, while 1111 was moved forward on to the short hood.
- UP 1616: an EMD SD70M locomotive painted in honor of Abraham Lincoln, the 16th U.S. president. During his tenure, Lincoln signed the Pacific Railway Act, which enabled the building of the Transcontinental Railroad System. It is painted in colors reminiscent of Lincoln's time and also commemorates locomotive 119, which was a key participant in the Golden Spike Ceremony.
- UP 1776: an EMD SD70M locomotive painted in a variation of Union Pacific's large flag livery, featuring silver trucks and an America250 logo on the nose and the rear.
- UP 1943: an EMD SD70AH locomotive painted to honor the United States Armed Forces. It wears the name "Spirit of the Union Pacific" as a nod to a Boeing B-17 that was shot down in World War II while bombing enemy installations in Muenster, Germany.
- UP 1979: an EMD SD70M locomotive painted to support diversity throughout the railroad and beyond. The number 1979 refers to the Black Employee Network of the railroad, which was founded in 1979.
- UP 2001 and 2002: two EMD SD70M locomotives painted for the 2002 Winter Olympics in Salt Lake City.
- UP 4547: a GE ET44AC locomotive built in with Wabtec and painted to honor Donald Trump, the 45th and 47th president of the United States. The design includes large American flag graphics on each side of the locomotive, with one depicting a 13-star flag representing the original colonies and the other a 50-star contemporary flag.
- UP 7400: a GE ES44AC locomotive painted to honor the Susan G. Komen for the Cure organization, and those affected by breast cancer.

Six locomotives painted to honor sports events, an organization, a military victory, and a U.S. president have been retired or repainted in standard Union Pacific livery:

- UP 1896 and 1996: two SD-40-2 locomotives that were rebuilt and repainted for the 1996 Summer Olympics in Atlanta (which marked 100 years since the first modern games, the 1896 Summer Olympics). From April 30 to June 3, 1996, a 19-car Olympic Torch Relay train that featured a specially designed "cauldron car" transported the Olympic flame across much of the western United States. The two locomotives have since been repainted and are still in service as UP 1684 and UP 1838, respectively. The number 1996 has since been given to the Southern Pacific Heritage Unit.
- UP 2010: a GE ES44AC locomotive that was painted to honor the Boy Scouts of America's 100th Anniversary. The locomotive has since been repainted in standard Union Pacific livery, but retains its original number.
- UP 3300: an EMD SD40-2 locomotive that was painted in a red, white and blue paint scheme to publicize the 1994 United Way campaign. Unveiled on August 18, 1994. Since repainted and still in service as UP 1878.
- UP 3593: an EMD SD40-2 locomotive that was painted in a camouflage tan and brown livery. Nicknamed the "Desert Victory Locomotive," it was unveiled on February 27, 1991, after the first Gulf War. The locomotive was later owned by Genesee & Wyoming and worked on the Rapid City, Pierre and Eastern Railroad as No. 3422. In May 2026, the locomotive was donated to the American Heartland Railroad Society in Sioux City, Iowa.
- UP 4141: an EMD SD70ACe locomotive painted to honor George H. W. Bush, the 41st President of the United States. The unit was removed from active service in 2007 and stored in North Little Rock until 2018, when it was reactivated to pull Bush's funeral train after his death in November 2018. After the tour, it returned to active service and continued to run until November 2019, when the Union Pacific donated it to the George H.W. Bush Presidential Library and Museum for display.
Community service locomotives

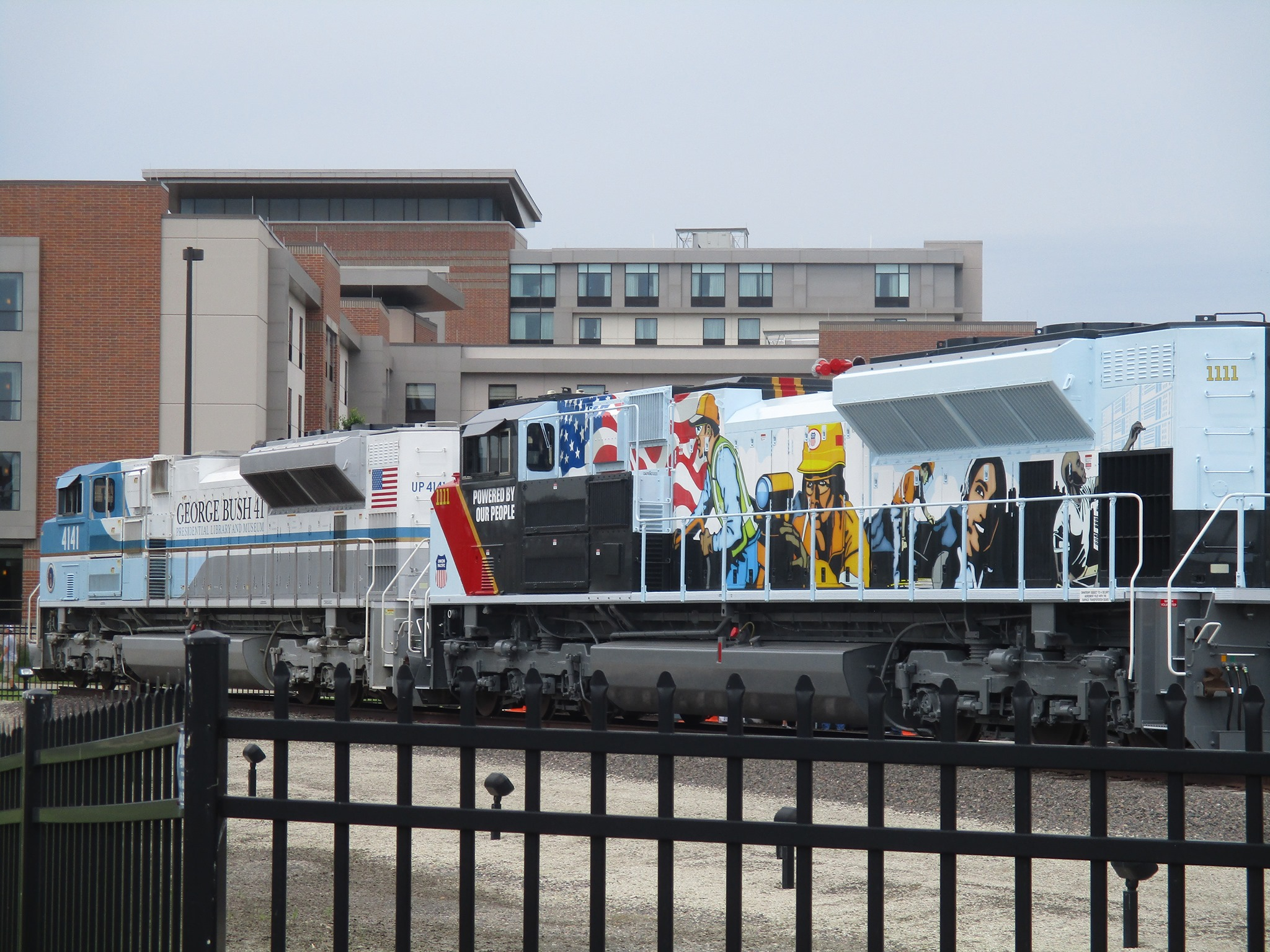
UP 1111 and 4141 on display in Omaha, Nebraska (2020)

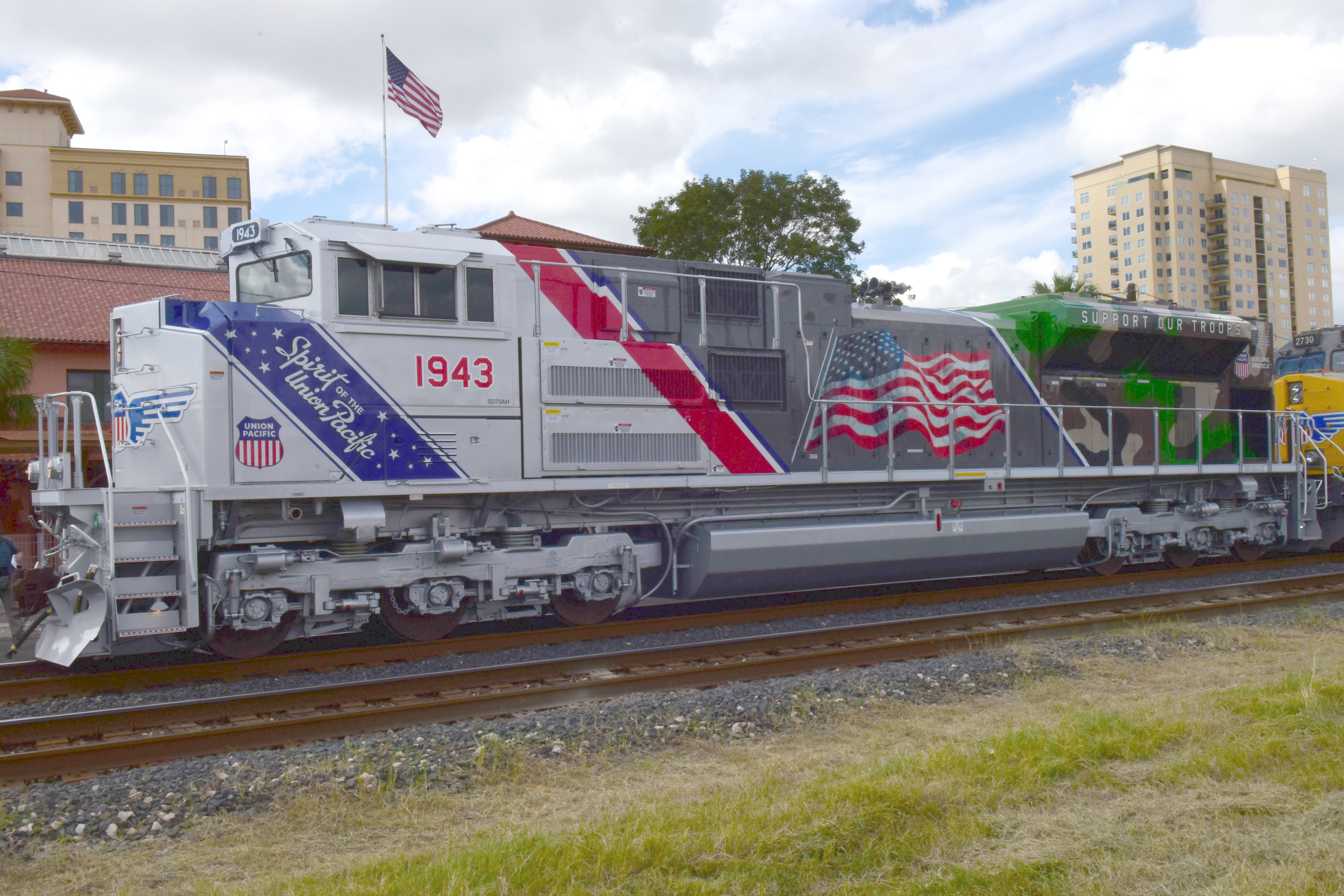
UP 1943 on a business train (2017)

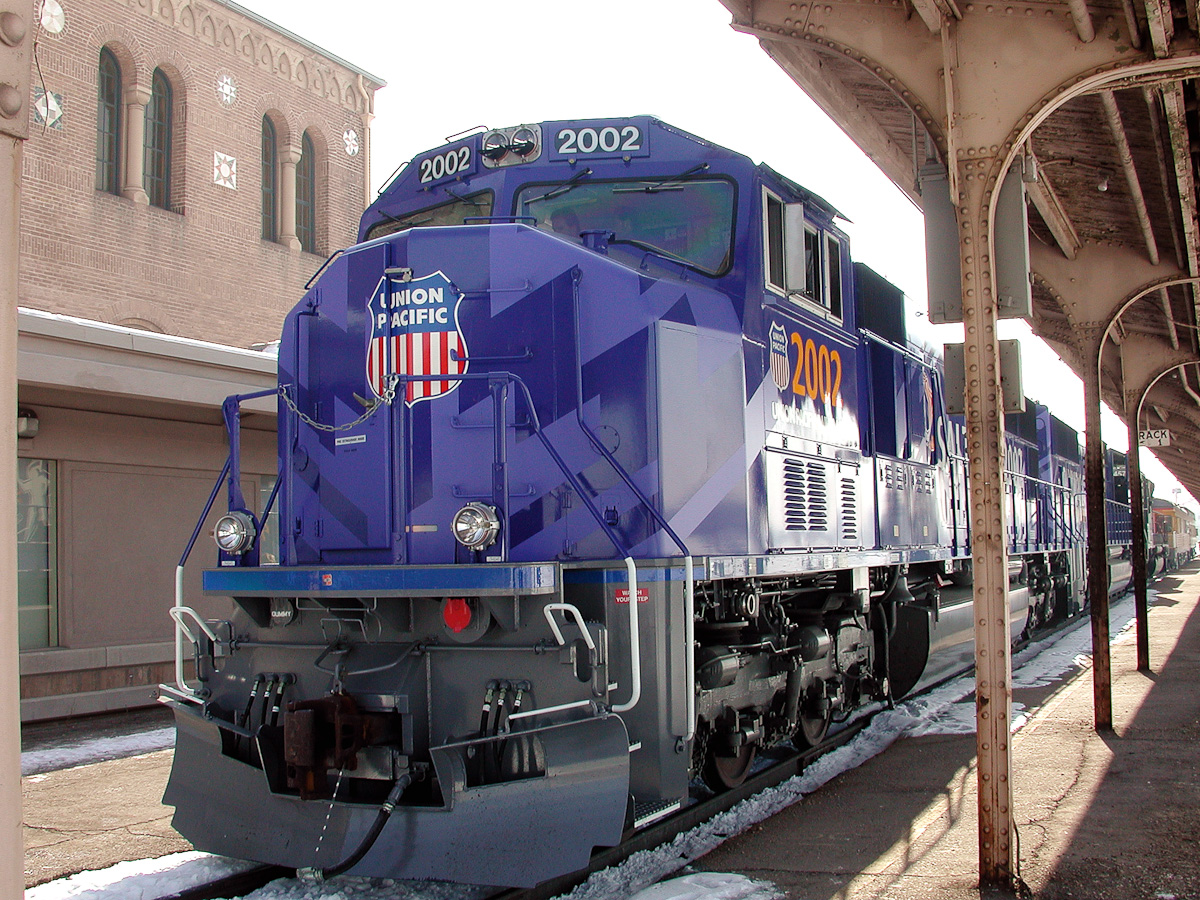
UP 2002 in Ogden, Utah (2009)

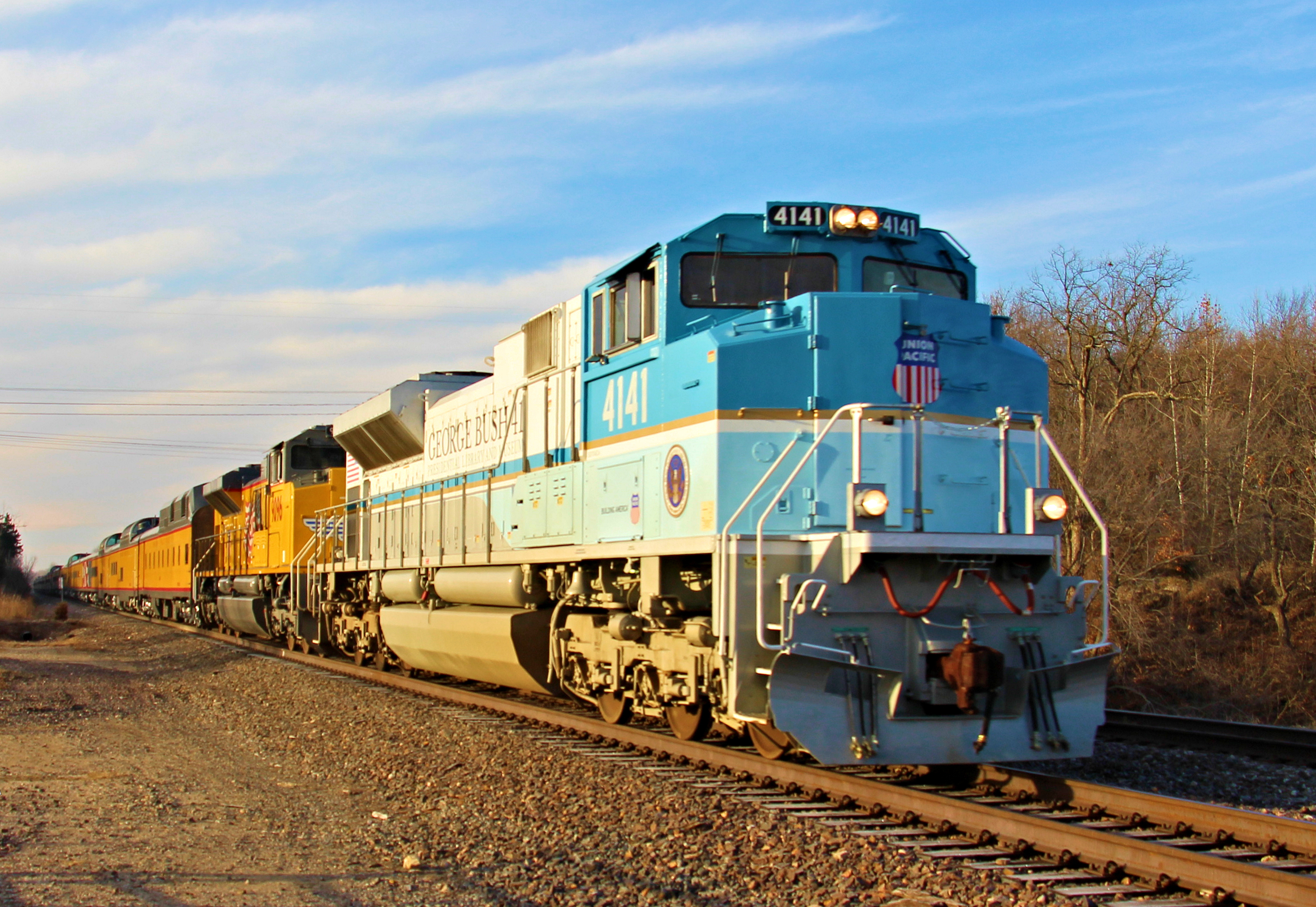
UP 4141 (now retired) with the Bush Funeral Train (2018)

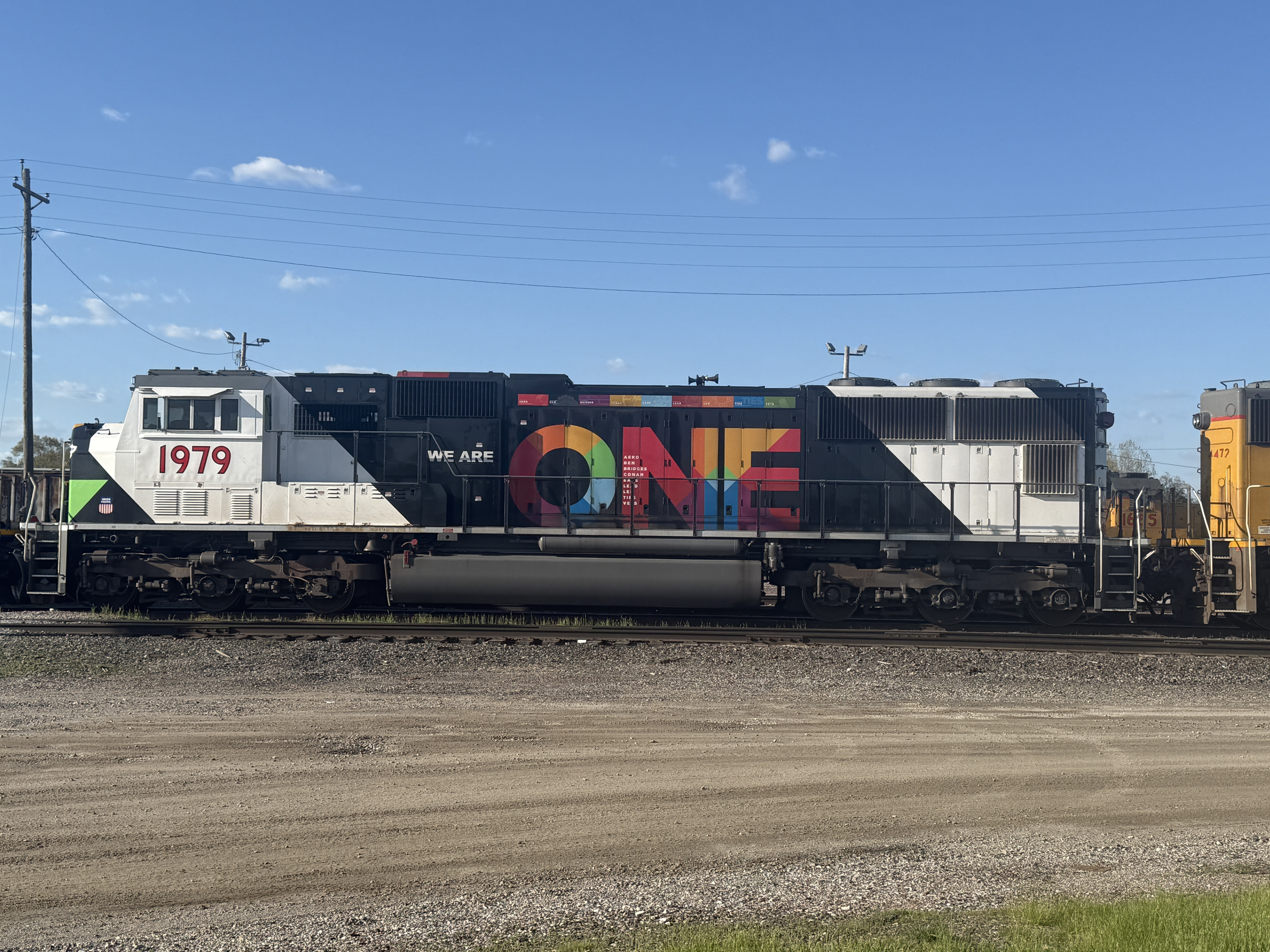
UP 1979 Diversity Livery (2025)

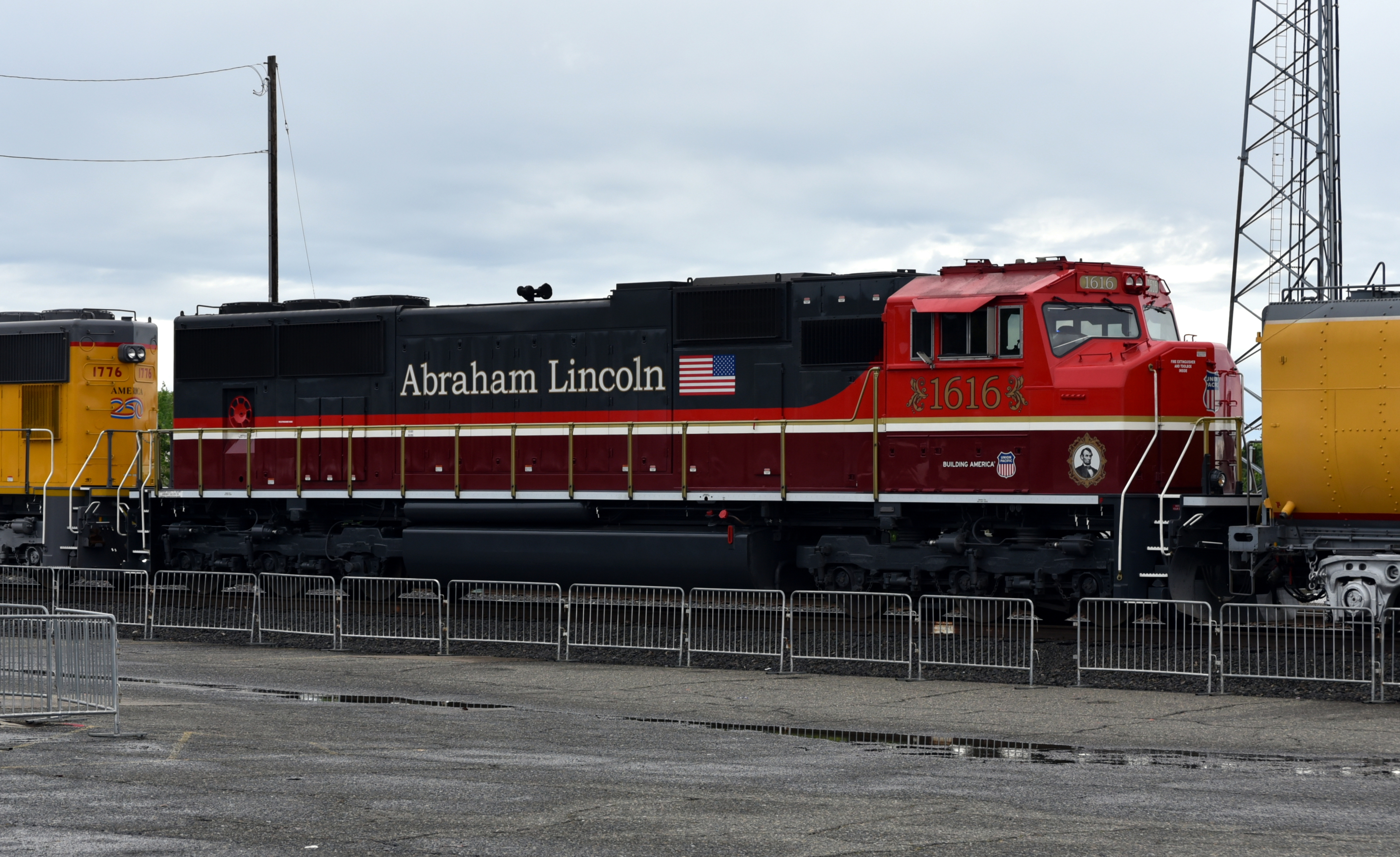
UP 1616 "Abraham Lincoln" (2026)

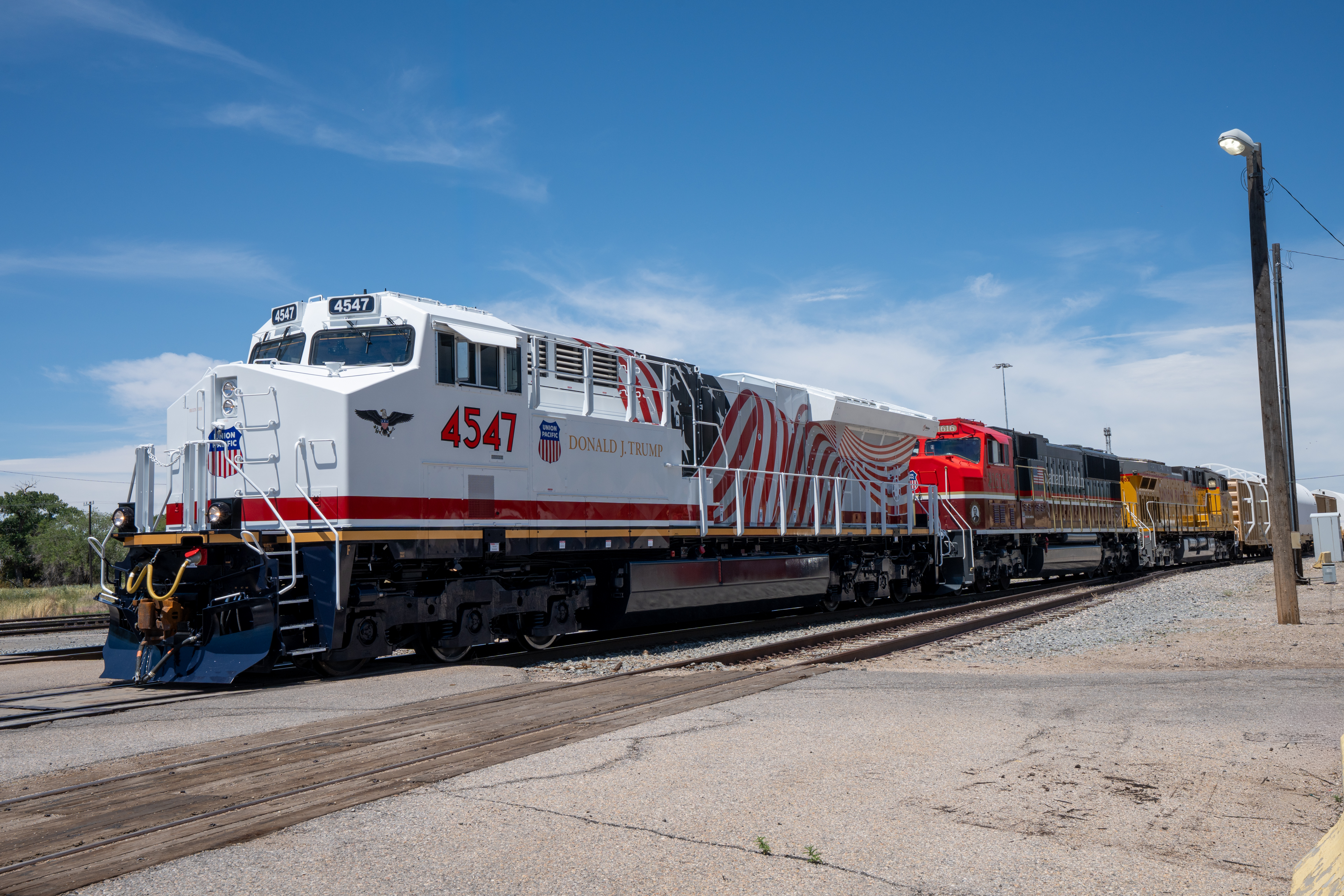
Union Pacific 4547 "Donald J. Trump" (2026)

== Passenger cars ==
The Union Pacific operates a fleet of passenger cars that are often used for excursions and office car specials. Originally ordered by a variety of railroads, the oldest dates to 1912, but most were built in the mid-20th century, at the height of passenger train service. The fleet also carries a variety of important people, such as presidents, senators, generals, soldiers, artists, architects, singers and actors.

=== Baggage ===
- No. 5769 Council Bluffs: built in 1962 as a postal storage car. It was converted for use as a baggage recreation car for a special train sent to the U.S. political conventions in 2000. On December 6, 2018, the car carried the casket of George H. W. Bush to College Station, Texas. It currently wears a large American Flag wrap on both sides.
- No. 5779 Promontory: built in 1962 as postal storage car No. 5779. It is the newest car in Union Pacific's Heritage Passenger Fleet. The car was renamed the Promontory in 1993, and was converted to a museum car originally designed for the Wyoming-Idaho Centennial train. Carpeted walls permit exhibits to be changed to reflect special needs. When not in use for displays, it is often equipped as an exercise car for long trips. In celebration of Union Pacific's 150th anniversary, the Building America exhibit was installed. The state-of-the-art traveling museum told the story of building the Transcontinental railroad through interactive touch-screen monitors, large display graphics and artifacts.
- No. 5752 Promontory: Built in 1962 as a U.S. Postal Service/postal storage car. During the 1970s, the car was rebuilt by the Union Pacific's Maintenance of Way (M.o.W.) team into a railway tool car and renumbered 904277. It remained in this configuration until it was retired (mid 1990s) and eventually stored away at the Union Pacific's coach shop until August 2018. During 2018 and 2019, the M.o.W. car 904277 was converted again into the Experience the Union Pacific car No. 5752 and renamed the Promontory, a brand new, multi-media walk-through exhibition that provides a glimpse at the past while telling the story of modern-day railroading.

=== Business ===
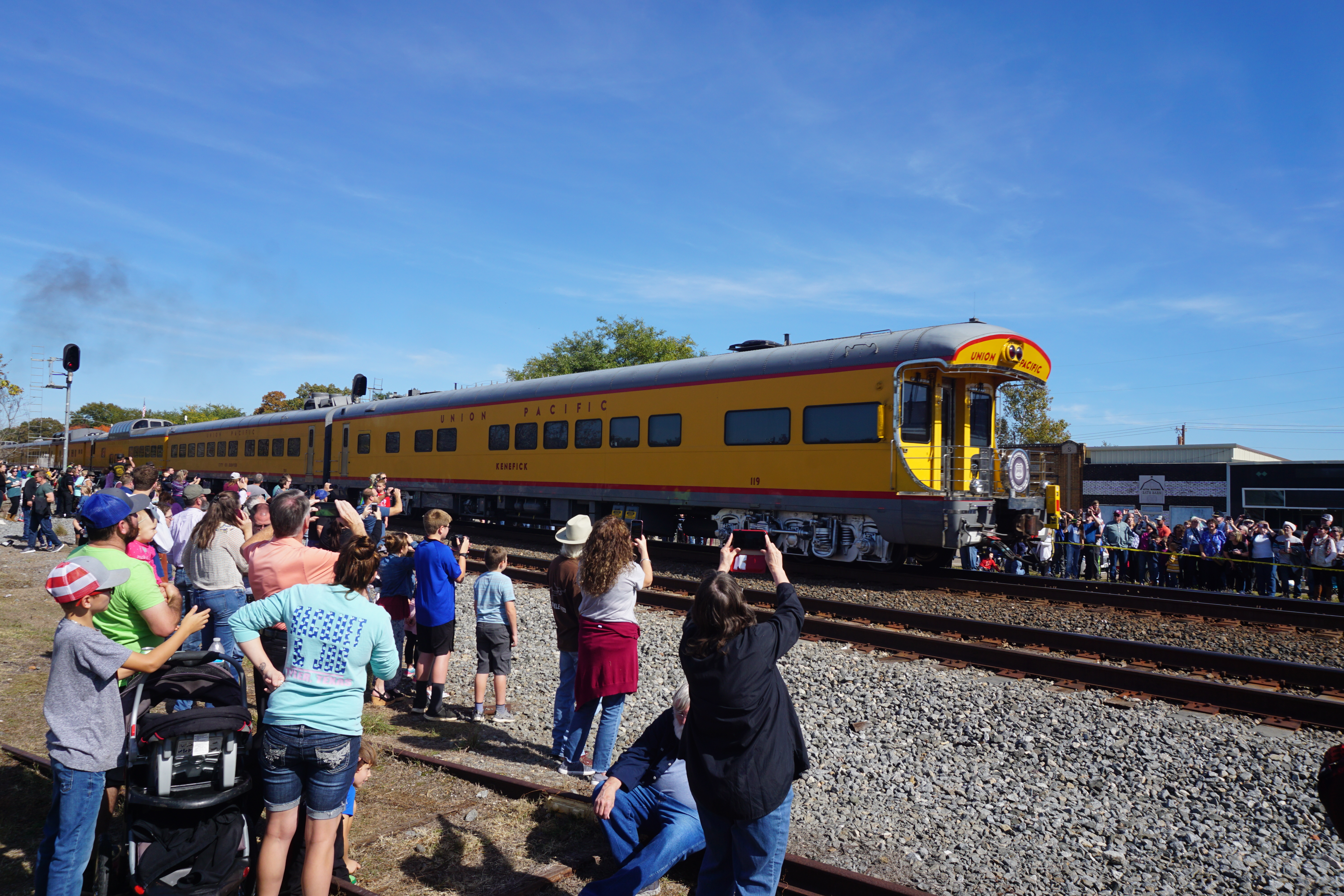
Kenefick at Overton, Texas in 2019

- No. 119 Kenefick: built in 1950 as coach No. 5446. It was rebuilt to business car no. 99 in 1963, and officially named the Kenefick in 1988.
- No. 102 St. Louis: built in 1950 as 44-seat coach No. 5448. It was rebuilt into business car No. 100 in May 1952, and was named the St. Louis in 1989. In 2010, the car was remodeled with a wood interior.
- No. 101 Lincoln: Built in 1950 as coach No. 5447. It was rebuilt in 1957 to the business car No. 100. It was renumbered in 1965 to No. 103, again in 1968 to No. 102, and again in 1971 to No. 101. In 1989, the car was named Pocatello after Shoshoni tribal Chief Pocatello who granted the right of way for Union Pacific pioneer subsidiary Oregon Short Line to build across Native American land in southeastern Idaho. The car received an extensive interior wood upgrade and was renamed Lone Star in 2001 in recognition of UP's operations in Texas, the Lone Star state. And in 2022, the car was again renamed Lincoln. This was done for two reasons: 1) to honor the nation's 16th president and 2) to honor the man who initially created the Union Pacific Railroad in 1862.
- No. 103 Cheyenne: built in 1950 as a five-bedroom lounge car called the Baker. It was rebuilt as business car No. 102 in 1965, and named the Cheyenne in 1989.
- No. 104 North Platte: built in 1926 as the Los Angeles and Salt Lake Railroad's Observation car No. 4403. The car was rebuilt in 1942 as Cafe Observation car No. 1563. In 1945, the car was remodeled and became LA&SL business car No. 123. The car was renumbered to No. 102 in 1952 and to No. 104 in 1957. No. 104 was remodeled in 1968 and stored in 1990. The car was brought out of storage, remodeled and named the North Platte in 1995.
- No. 106 Shoshone: built in 1914 as business car No. 99 for then Union Pacific Chairman Robert Lovett. It was renumbered No. 106 in June 1952, and named Shoshone in 1978. It was donated to the California State Railroad Museum in 1985. Shoshone was loaned back to Union Pacific in 1992 in exchange for business car No. 103.
- No. 114 Feather River: built in 1956 as a five-bedroom lounge car called Boise. In 1963, this car was converted to business car No. 114.
- No. 100 Arden: built in 1950 as a standard coach, rebuilt in 1952 as a business coach.

=== Club lounge ===
- No. 6203 Sun Valley: built in 1949 by American Car & Foundry as club lounge No. 6203, then named the Colorado River, a part of the Rivers rail car series, which featured barber shops and valet service. The car was rebuilt in 1959, and the barber shop and valet areas were converted into card rooms. The car was named Sun Valley in 1989.

=== Coach ===
- No. 5483 Texas Eagle: built in 1953 as 44-seat coach No. 5483. It was named the Texas Eagle in 1990.

=== Concession ===
- No. 5818 Reed Jackson: built in 1961 by the St. Louis Car Company as Railroad Post Office (RPO) UP5818. It was converted into a maintenance of way tool car in 1968 and then into a maintenance of way kitchen car in 1981. The car became part of the Heritage Passenger Fleet in 1992 and was converted into the concession car Sherman Hill that same year. In August 2009, the car was renamed the Reed Jackson, in honor of the Union Pacific Steam Team's conductor who suddenly died on August 15, 2009.

=== Deluxe sleeper ===
- No. 412 Lake Forest: built in 1965 as a 72-seat coach for the Kansas City Southern Railway and numbered No. 270. In 1972, it was sold to the New Jersey Department of Transportation and renumbered No. 5341. The coach served in New Jersey area commuter service until 1986, when it was sold to the Chicago & North Western. The C&NW rebuilt the car into an eight-bedroom stateroom sleeper, No. 412, and was named Lake Forest. Union Pacific acquired the Lake Forest in 1995 as a result of the C&NW merger. It was reconfigured as a deluxe four-bedroom sleeper in 2008.
- No. 413 Lake Bluff: built for the Kansas City Southern Railway in 1965 as coach No. 272. The coach was sold to the New Jersey Department of Transportation in 1972 and renumbered No. 5342. The Chicago and North Western acquired it in 1986, renumbered it to No. 413, and was renamed Lake Bluff. The Lake Bluff was an eight-bedroom sleeper that became part of Union Pacific's Heritage Passenger Fleet as the result of the 1995 Union Pacific and C&NW merger. It was reconfigured as a deluxe four-bedroom sleeper in 2008.
- No. 1602 Green River: built in 1949 as the 12-roomette, four-bedroom sleeper, the No. 1602 Western Hills. It was rebuilt in 1965 to an 11-bedroom sleeper, Sun Isle. In 1991, the car was reconfigured into an eight-bedroom deluxe sleeper and renamed the Green River.
- No. 1603 Wyoming: built in 1949 by as the 12-roomette, four-bedroom sleeper named Western Lodge. It was rebuilt in 1965 into an 11-bedroom sleeper No. 1603, Sun Lake. In 1974 it was rebuilt into a four-bedroom deluxe sleeper and renamed Wyoming.
- No. 1605 Powder River: built in 1949 as a 12-roomette, four-bedroom sleeper named Western Plains. It was rebuilt in 1965 into an 11-bedroom sleeper named Sun Manor. In 1989 it was rebuilt into a four-bedroom deluxe sleeper and renamed the Powder River. It received a full wood interior upgrade in 2003.
- No. 1608 Omaha: built in 1949 as the 12-roomette, four-bedroom sleeper called the Western Star. It was rebuilt in 1965 to an 11-bedroom sleeper, No. 1608 Sun Rest, and rebuilt again in 1974 to an eight-bedroom sleeper and renamed the Omaha.
- No. 1610 Portola: built in 1949 as a 12-roomette, four-bedroom sleeper, named the Western Valley. It was rebuilt in 1965 to an 11-bedroom sleeper, the No. 1610 Sun Skies. In 1989, the car was converted into an eight-bedroom sleeper and renamed the Portola. It received a full wood interior upgrade in 2004.
- No. 315 Little Rock: built in 1949 as the 12-roomette, four-bedroom sleeper Western Scene. It was rebuilt to an 11-bedroom sleeper, No. 1612 Sun Villa, in 1965. It was renamed the North Platte in 1990, and finally Little Rock in 1995. The car was rebuilt as a four-bedroom deluxe sleeper in 2008.
- No. 4003 Pacific Limited: built in 1955 as cafeteria lounge No. 4003, one of only four cars in that configuration for Union Pacific. As the name implies, it had a typical lunch counter in addition to regular seating. It was reacquired by Union Pacific in 1993 and named Pacific Limited. In 2012, the car was reconfigured into a four-bedroom deluxe sleeper.

=== Diner ===
- No. 5011 City of Denver: built in 1959 as lunch counter cafe and lounge No. 5011. It was sold to Golden Wool Co. in 1972. Union Pacific reacquired the car in 1989, when it was rebuilt into a 36-seat dining car and named the City of Denver.
- No. 4808 City of Los Angeles: was built in 1949 as 48-seat diner No. 4808. The car still retains its original configuration and was named the City of Los Angeles in 1991.
- No. 302 Overland: built in 1949 as lunch counter cafe and lounge No. 5015. It was rebuilt as a 36-seat diner in 1988. It received a wood interior upgrade in 2005.

=== Dome coach ===
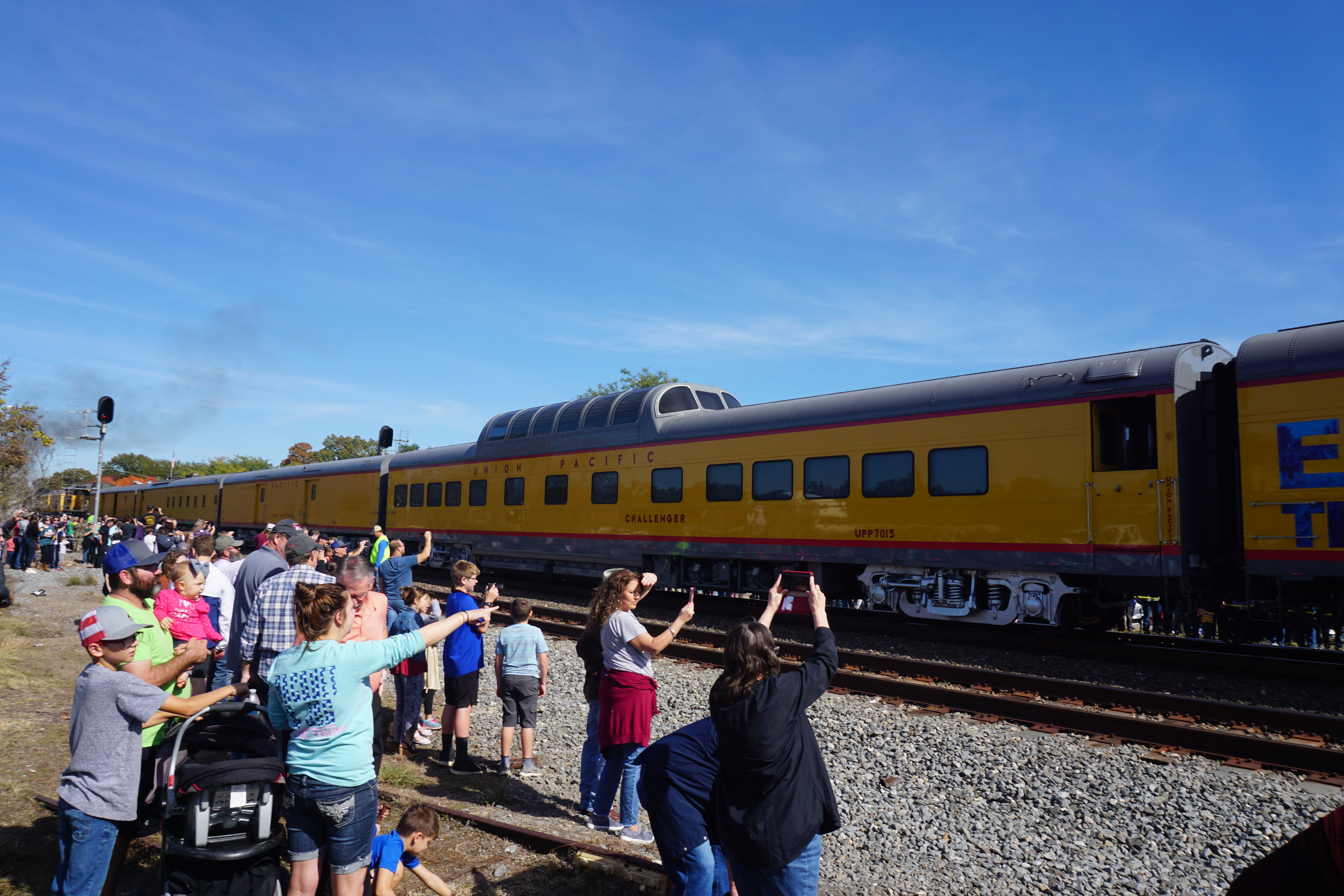
Challenger at Overton, Texas in 2019

- No. 7001 Columbine: built in 1955 as dome coach No. 7001. It was reacquired by Union Pacific in 1989.
- No. 7015 Challenger: built in 1958 as dome coach No. 7015, the last dome car built. It was reacquired by Union Pacific in 1989.

=== Dome diner ===
- No. 7011 Missouri River Eagle: built in 1958 as dome coach No. 7011. In 1993, it was named the Missouri River Eagle, after a Missouri Pacific Railroad passenger train. The car was converted to a dome diner in the mid-1980s by Transico, an excursion train operator. UP repurchased the car in the early 1990s.
- No. 8004 Colorado Eagle: built in 1955 as dome diner No. 8004. It was reacquired by Union Pacific in 1993 and named the Colorado Eagle after the synonymous streamliner, which began service on the Missouri Pacific Railroad on June 21, 1942.
- No. 8008 City of Portland: one of ten dome cars built in 1955. Union Pacific reacquired the car in 1990 and rebuilt it for excursion service. The car was named City of Portland after the famous streamliner passenger train.

=== Dome lounge ===
- No. 9004 Harriman: built in 1955 as dome lounge No. 9004. It was remodeled and named Harriman in 1988. This car received a full wood interior upgrade in 2006. The car is named in honor of Edward Harriman, an American railroad executive and the president of the Union Pacific Railroad from 1904 to 1909.
- No. 9005 Walter Dean: built in 1955 as dome lounge No. 9005. It was sold to the Auto-Train Corporation, then reacquired by Union Pacific and named the Walter Dean in 1990. The car is named for Walter Dean, who began his service with Union Pacific in 1942 as a dining car waiter on the Challenger.
- No. 9009 City of San Francisco: built in 1955 as dome lounge No. 9009 and named in 1993. An Astra Dome car, it is the only dome lounge in the Union Pacific Heritage Passenger Fleet that is still configured for end-of-train service. The car still has windows in the back wall, and the necessary exterior lighting so it can be used as the last car of a train.

=== Crew car/Crew sleeper ===
- No. 202 Willie James: built in 1949 as a 10-roomette, six-bedroom sleeper named the Pacific Domain. In 1973, it was rebuilt and named No. 202. The car was renamed the Cabarton in 1980 by John C. Kenefick, then Union Pacific's president, in honor of R.L. Richmond, Union Pacific's then vice president of operations. The car was renamed Willie James in January 2009 to honor long-time business car chef Willie James.
- No. 314 Columbia River: built in 1949 as the Western Wonderland, a 12-roomette (single), four-bedroom sleeper. It was converted to an 11-bedroom car, the No. 1611 Sun Slope, in 1965. The car resembles traditional passenger sleeping cars because upper berths still remain in some rooms. In 1989, it was named the Columbia River.

=== Inspection ===
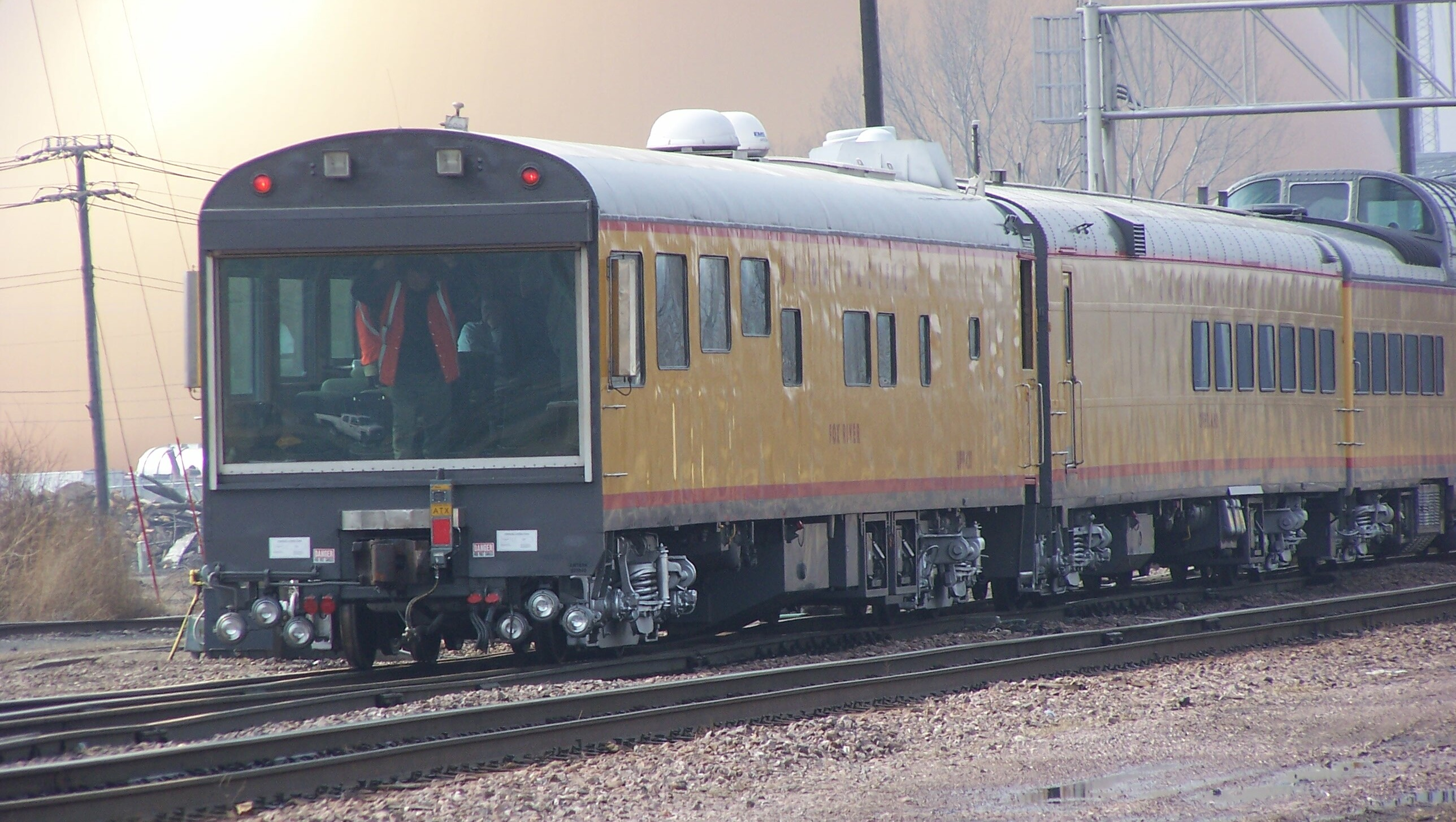
No. 420 Fox River (2007)

- No. 203 Idaho: built in 1949 as a 12-roomette, four-double bedroom car named the Western Mountain. It was rebuilt in 1965 as an 11-bedroom sleeper named Sun Lane, and was converted to the inspection car Idaho in 1980.
- No. 420 Fox River: built in 1954 as a two-bedroom, two-compartment, buffet-lounge-sleeper for the Canadian National Railway. In 1984, Milwaukee Rail Car reconstructed it into a theater inspection car.

=== Power ===
- No. 207: built in 1949 as a boiler/baggage/dormitory car, later rebuilt as steam generator dormitory car No. 303, and renumbered to No. 207 in 1987.
- No. 208: built in 1949 as a boiler/baggage/dormitory car, later rebuilt as steam generator dormitory car No. 304, and renumbered to No. 208 in 1987.
- No. 2055: built in 1962 as a commissary/postal storage car, later sold to Ringling Bros. and Barnum & Bailey Circus, who converted it into a power car. In 2017, Union Pacific reacquired the power car as the circus disbanded.
- No. 2066: built as postal storage car No. 5816.

=== Tool car ===
- No. 6334 Art Lockman: built in 1962 as baggage car No. 6334. It was one of the last baggage cars purchased by Union Pacific. The car was converted to a tool car for snowplow service and renumbered No. 904304 in 1973. It was assigned to the Heritage Passenger Fleet in 1981. The car was named Art Lockman in 1992 and was renumbered UPP 6334 in 2003.

== Donated equipment ==
On April 28, 2022, Union Pacific announced that several pieces of equipment from their Heritage Fleet roster would be donated to the Railroading Heritage of Midwest America (RRHMA), a non-profit organization in Silvis, Illinois. The full list of equipment being donated includes three main pieces:

- UP 3985: a 4-6-6-4 "Challenger" class dual-service steam locomotive, operated in excursion service from 1981 to 2010 and was retired as of January 2020. Delivered in 1943, it operated in revenue service until it was withdrawn from service in 1962. After retirement, it was stored in the UP roundhouse until 1975, when it was moved to the employees' parking lot outside the depot in Cheyenne, Wyoming. It sat on display until 1979, when a team of employee volunteers restored it to service in 1981. After the restoration, it was the largest operating steam locomotive in the world until it lost the title to UP 4014. In 2007, it underwent repairs for service and was back up and running in 2008 to continue its run, but further mechanical problems caused it to be placed back into storage in October 2010. It was subsequently retired in January 2020 after 4014's restoration.
- UP 5511: a 2-10-2 Class TTT-6 steam locomotive. It is the last remaining member of its class and the only remaining 2-10-2 to be operated by the Union Pacific. It ran in revenue service until 1956, but was used briefly in December 1958 during filming of the documentary Last of the Giants. The locomotive never operated in excursion service and has remained in storage.
- UP 6936: an EMD DDA40X "Centennial" diesel-electric locomotive, the last of its class in service. These were the largest diesel locomotives ever built and were manufactured specifically for UP. Built in January 1971, it served in revenue service over the next decade and into the mid-1980s across the Union Pacific system until making its last regular freight trip on May 6, 1985. It then became a part of the railroad's excursion fleet until being placed into storage in 2016. Union Pacific has marked DD40X on the cab exteriors, while EMD literature inconsistently refers to this model as either DD-40X or DDA40X.

Besides the three locomotives, other pieces of equipment being donated include an unrestored E9B locomotive, four coaches, a diner lounge car, two business cars, a baggage car, and a caboose.

RRHMA has plans to eventually restore the No. 3985 and 5511 steam locomotives to operating condition. As part of the deal, the Union Pacific has the option to reclaim the equipment at any time upon reimbursing the museum for its costs. On May 13, 2022, RRHMA launched a fundraiser to raise enough money for the restoration of the Nos. 3985 and 5511 steam locomotives. The first five cars were moved to Silvis in August 2022, while the rest of the donated equipment were moved to their new home in November 2022. Restoration efforts on the No. 3985 began in January 2023. As of September 2026, Nos. 3985 and 5511 are under restoration, No. 6936 is operational, and many passenger cars have been repaired and repainted.

Donated Union Pacific locomotives

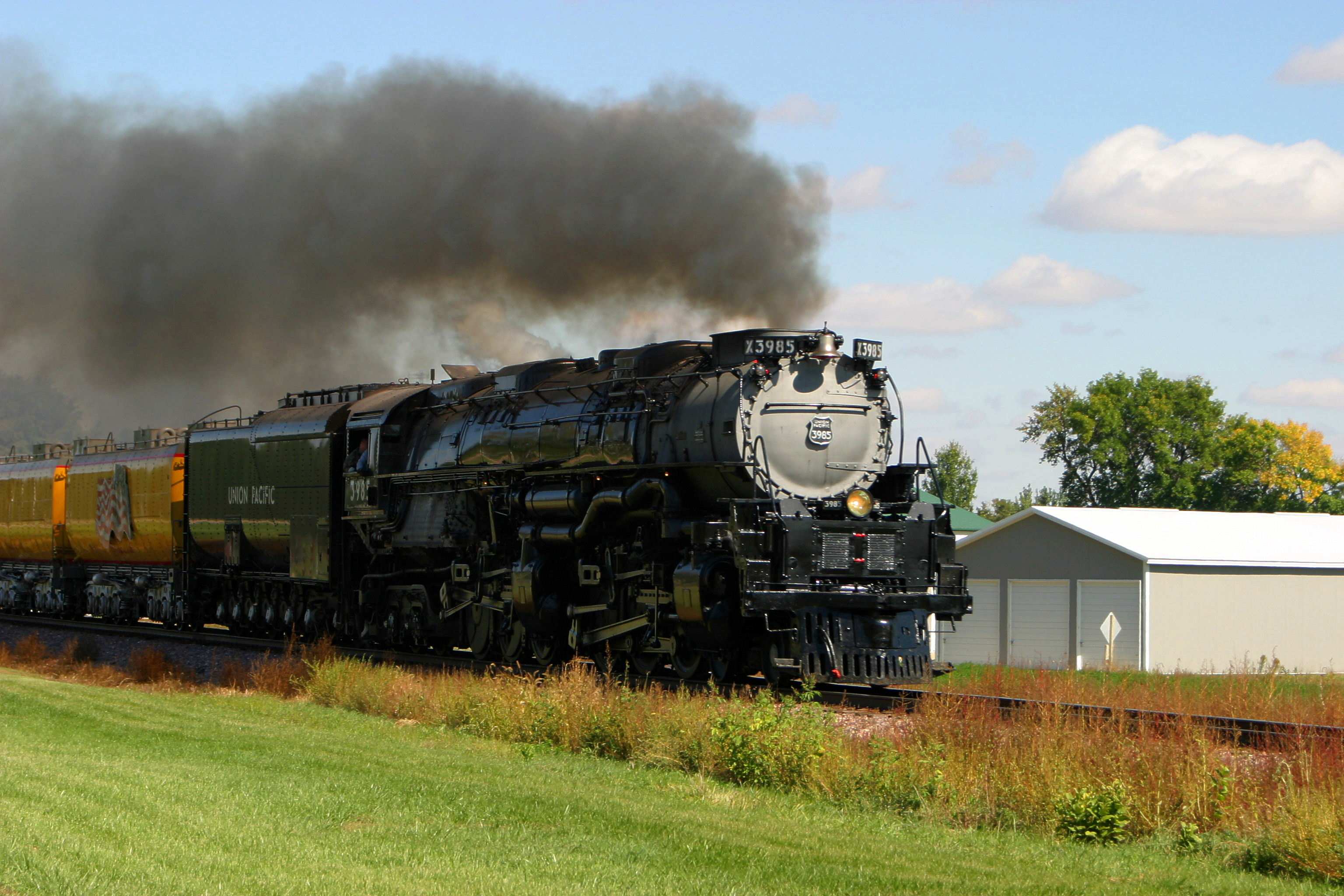
UP 3985 running through Alton, Iowa on October 1, 2008.

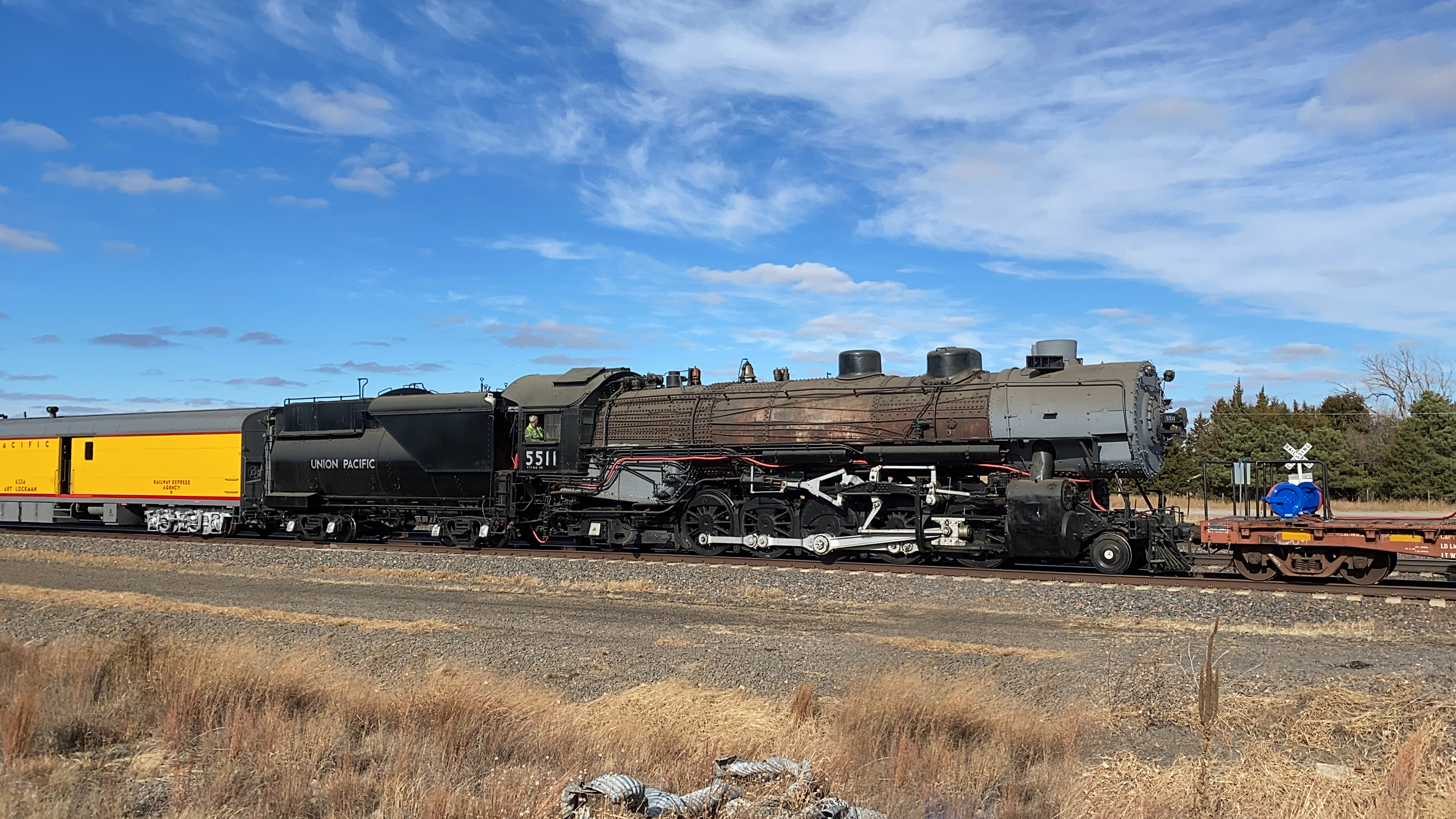
UP 5511 in Brady, Nebraska, being towed to Silvis, Illinois, in November 2022.

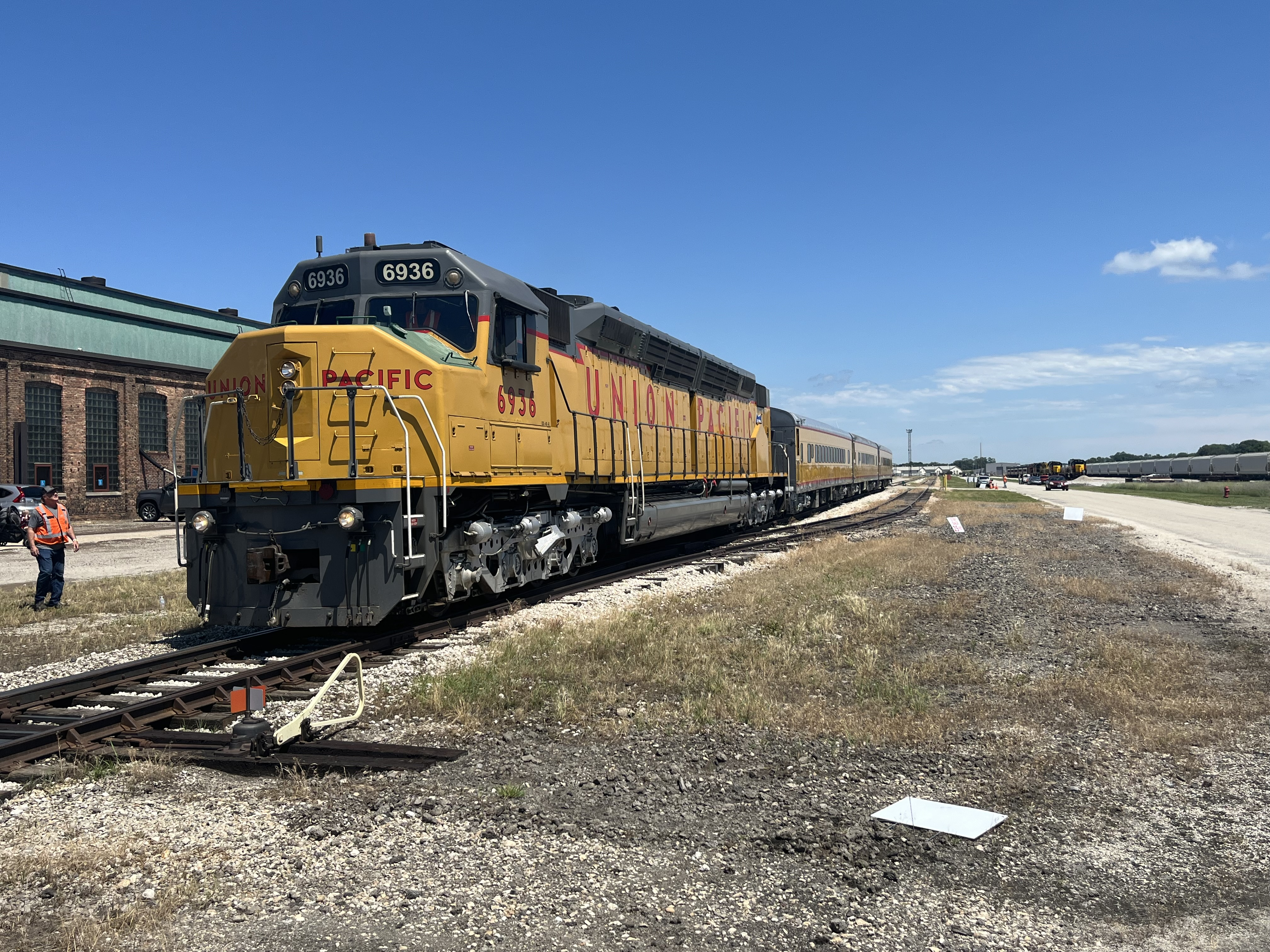
UP 6936 in Silvis, Illinois in June 2024.
