= 4-6-6-4 =

Articulated locomotive wheel arrangement

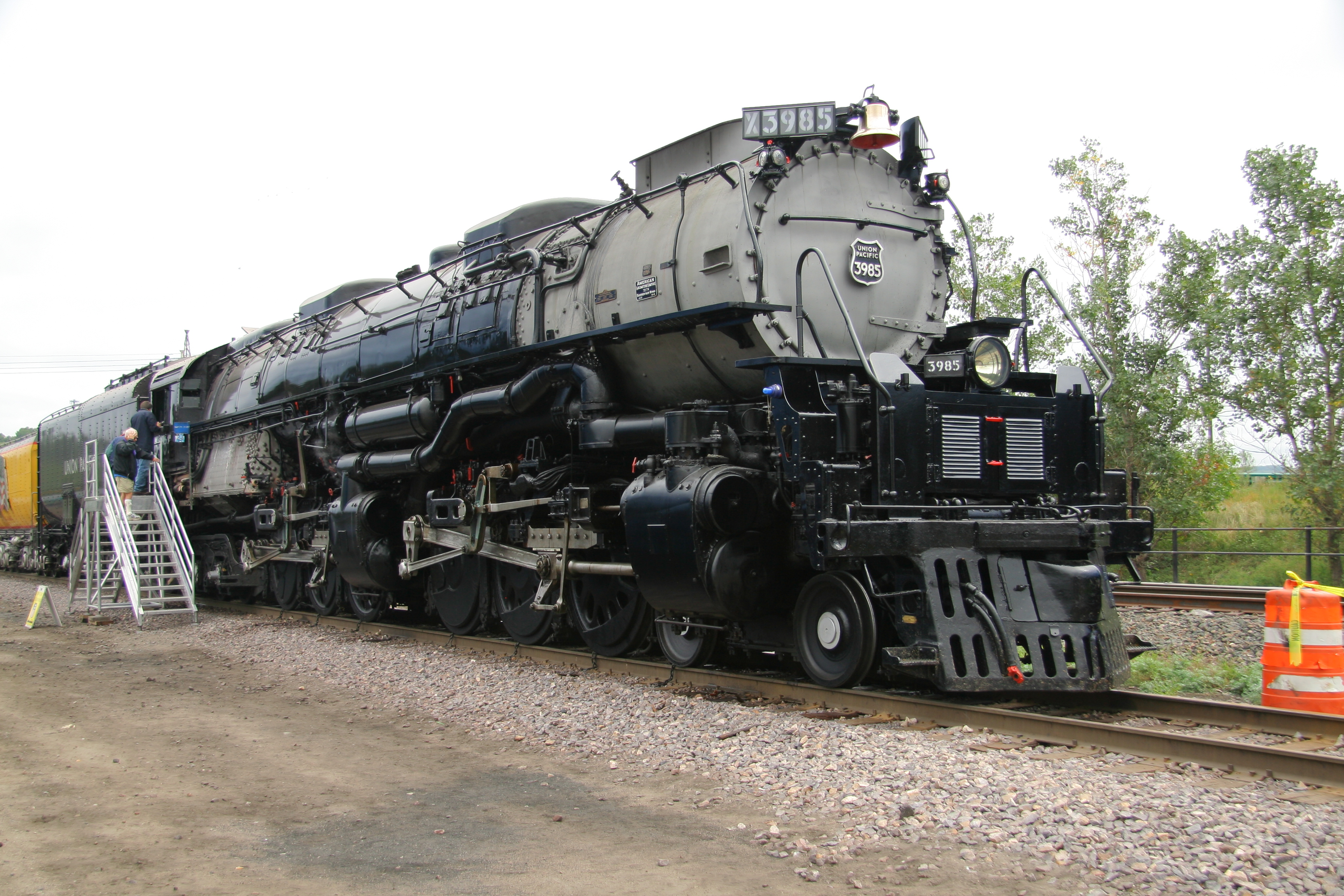
Union Pacific Challenger No. 3985 is an example of a 4-6-6-4 locomotive

In the Whyte notation for classifying steam locomotives by wheel arrangement, a 4-6-6-4 is a railroad steam locomotive that has four leading wheels followed by two sets of six coupled driving wheels and four trailing wheels. 4-6-6-4s are commonly known as Challengers.

A similar wheel arrangement exists for Garratt locomotives, on which both engine units swivel, but is referred to as 4-6-0+0-6-4.

Other equivalent classifications are:
UIC classification: 2CC2 (also known as German classification and Italian classification)
French classification: 230+032
Turkish classification: 35+35
Swiss classification: 3/5+3/5

The UIC classification is refined to (2'C)C2' for simple articulated locomotives.

Challengers were most common in the Union Pacific Railroad, but many other railroads ordered them as well. The vast majority of these were built by the American Locomotive Company, although the Baldwin Locomotive Works also built Challengers for two customers: the Denver and Rio Grande Western and Western Maryland Railway. An expansion for the Union Pacific Challenger class was the Union Pacific Big Boy class, being a 4-8-8-4, instead of a 4-6-6-4.

Today, the only Challenger locomotives that survive were both owned by Union Pacific. One such locomotive, Union Pacific 3985, was operated by the Union Pacific Railroad in excursion service from 1981 to 2010, when mechanical problems took it out of service. It was retired in January 2020 due to its poor mechanical condition and subsequently donated to the Railroading Heritage of Midwest America, where it is now undergoing a second restoration. The second example, Union Pacific 3977 is on static display in Cody Park North Platte, Nebraska.

Though originally intended for freight service, many units could be found for leading passenger consists as well.

== Roster of locomotives ==
Railroads that used the Challenger type locomotive include:

4-6-6-4 construction roster
Railroad (quantity)	Class	Road numbers	Builder	Build year	Notes
Clinchfield Railroad (12 new, 6 secondhand)	E-1	650–657	ALCO	1942–1943	Scrapped between 1953 and 1958
Clinchfield Railroad (12 new, 6 secondhand)	E-2	660–663	ALCO	1947	Scrapped between 1955 and 1959
Clinchfield Railroad (12 new, 6 secondhand)	E-3	670–675	ALCO	1943	Ex-D&RGW, acquired 1947. Scrapped 1959
Delaware and Hudson Railway (40)	J	1500–1539	ALCO	1940–1946	Scrapped between 1951 and 1959
Denver and Rio Grande Western Railroad (21)	L-105	3700–3709	Baldwin	1938	Scrapped between 1951 and 1956
Denver and Rio Grande Western Railroad (21)	L-105	3710–3714	Baldwin	1942	Scrapped between 1951 and 1956
Denver and Rio Grande Western Railroad (21)	L-97	3800–3805	ALCO	1943	Diverted to the D&RGW from a UP order. To Clinchfield Railroad in 1947. Scrapped 1959
Great Northern Railway (2 secondhand)	Z-6	4000–4001	ALCO	1937	Ex-SP&S 903–904; sold back to SP&S March 1950 and July 1946 respectively. Scrapped between 1953 and 1957
Northern Pacific Railway (47)	Z-6	5100–5120	ALCO	1936–1937	Scrapped between 1950 and 1953
Northern Pacific Railway (47)	Z-7	5121–5126	ALCO	1941	Scrapped between 1951 and 1954
Northern Pacific Railway (47)	Z-8	5130–5149	ALCO	1943–1944	Scrapped between 1952 and 1957
Spokane, Portland and Seattle Railway (8)	Z-6	900–905	ALCO	1937	Identical to NP Z-6 class; 903–904 sold to GN January 1940; purchased back March 1950 and July 1946 respectively
Spokane, Portland and Seattle Railway (8)	Z-8	910–911	ALCO	1944	Identical to NP Z-8 class
Union Pacific Railroad (105)	CSA-1	3900–3914	ALCO	1936	To UP 3800–3814. Scrapped between 1957 and 1958
Union Pacific Railroad (105)	CSA-2	3915–3939	ALCO	1937	To UP 3815–3839. Scrapped 1958
Union Pacific Railroad (105)	4664-3	3950–3969	ALCO	1942	Scrapped between 1958 and 1959
Union Pacific Railroad (105)	4664-4	3975–3999	ALCO	1943	No. 3977 and 3985 are preserved.
Union Pacific Railroad (105)	4664-5	3930–3949	ALCO	1944	Scrapped between 1957 and 1959
Western Maryland Railway (12)	M-2	1201–1212	Baldwin	1940–1941	These and the 15 units for the D&RGW were the only ones of this type made by Baldwin. Scrapped 1958
Western Pacific Railroad (7)	M-100	401–407	ALCO	1938	Scrapped between 1953 and 1959
