= History of the Union Pacific Railroad =

American RR, 1862 to 1998

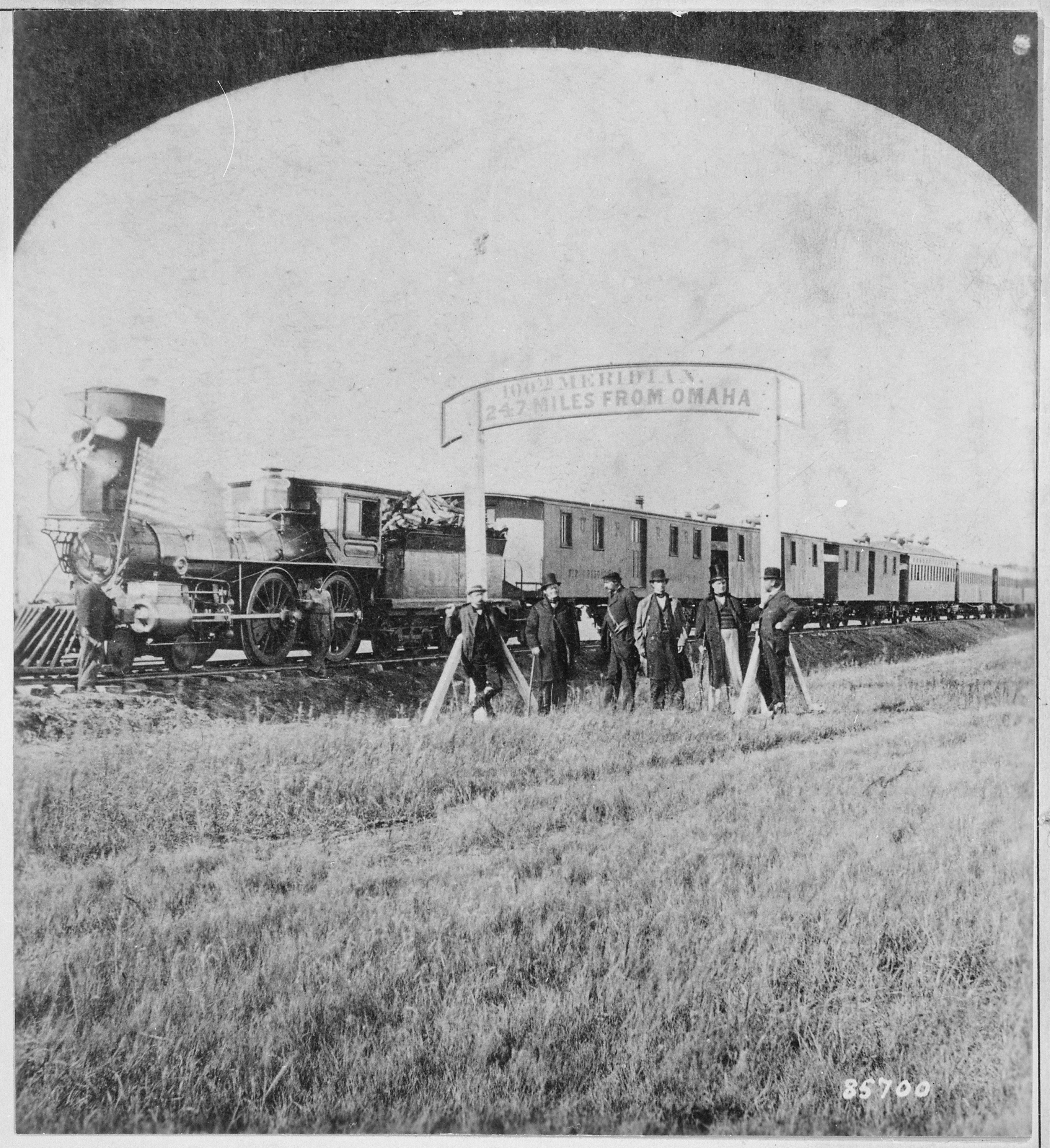
Directors of the Union Pacific Railroad gather on the 100th meridian, which later became Cozad, Nebraska, approximately 250 miles (400 km) west of Omaha, Nebraska Territory, in October 1866. The train in the background awaits the party of Eastern capitalists, newspapermen, and other prominent figures invited by the railroad executives.

The history of the Union Pacific Railroad stretches from 1862 to the present. For operations of the current railroad, see Union Pacific Railroad; for the holding company that owns the current railroad, see Union Pacific Corporation.

There have been four railroads called Union Pacific: Union Pacific Rail Road, Union Pacific Railway, Union Pacific Railroad (Mark I), and Union Pacific Railroad (Mark II). This article covers the Union Pacific Rail Road (UPRR, 1862–1880), Union Pacific Railway (1880–1897), and Union Pacific Railroad (Mark I)(UP, 1897–1998). For the history of the Union Pacific Railroad (Mark II), see Union Pacific and Southern Pacific Transportation Company.

== Beginnings: 19th century ==
The original company, Union Pacific Rail Road (UPRR), was created and funded by the federal government by Pacific Railroad Acts of 1862 and 1864. The laws were passed as war measures to forge closer ties with California and Oregon, which otherwise took six months to reach. UPRR remained under partial federal control until the 1890s. Its management was noted for many feuds and high turnover. The UPRR main line started in Council Bluffs, Iowa and moved west to link up with the Central Pacific Railroad line, which was built eastward from Sacramento.

Construction on the UPRR main line was delayed until the American Civil War ended in 1865. Some 300 miles of main line track were built in 1865–66 over the flat prairies. The Rocky Mountains posed a much more dramatic challenge but the crews had learned to work at a much faster pace with 240 miles built in 1867 and 555 miles in 1868–69. The two lines were joined in Utah on May 10, 1869, hence creating the first transcontinental railroad in North America. Interstate 80, built in the 1950s, paralleled the UPRR main line.

In 1870 the fare in coach from Omaha to San Francisco was $33.20 ($845.30 in 2025), with sleeper cars costing extra. The train stopped for meals at lunch rooms along the way. Passenger traffic for the long trip was light at first—2,000 a month in the 1870s, growing to 10,000 a month in the 1880s.

Wall Street speculator Jay Gould (1836–1892) took control of the UPRR in 1874, as well as the smaller Kansas Pacific Railway based in Kansas City. He merged the two into the Union Pacific Railway in 1880, giving the Union Pacific new markets in the wheat and ranching regions of Kansas and eastern Colorado. Branches were opened to mining districts in Montana, Idaho, and Utah and (until 1893) to farmlands in Oregon. Despite severe austerity measures the Union Pacific was unable to repay its old government loans. Most of the wheat farmers joined the People's Party, a Populist movement in the 1890s and engaged in heated anti-railroad rhetoric. The Populists were soon voted out and had no lasting impact on the Union Pacific.

In the Panic of 1893 financial crisis the Union Pacific Railway, like 153 other American railroads, went bankrupt. The trains continued to operate but the bondholders lost their investment. In 1897, a new Union Pacific Railroad (UP) was formed and absorbed the Union Pacific Railway; this new railroad reverted to the original Union Pacific name of the original company but now pronounced "Railroad" and not "Rail Road". In 1898, E. H. Harriman (1848–1909) formed a syndicate with the aid of Kuhn, Loeb & Co. to purchase the UP. He upgraded its 3,000 miles of trackage, modernized its equipment and merged it with the Southern Pacific, which dominated California. The Supreme Court broke up the merger in 1910. From 1910 to 1980, there was little growth in the UP, which dominated the farming, ranching, mining and tourist trade in a region stretching from Omaha and Kansas City in the East, to Salt Lake City and Denver in the West. Economically, the UP provided transcontinental service, as well as shipping out wheat and other crops, cattle, and mining products and bringing in consumer items and industrial goods from the East.

There was little expansion 1910–1980 but after that the UP system grew to over 32,000 miles (51,000 km) of track with large lines like the Southern Pacific, the Missouri Pacific Railroad and the Missouri–Kansas–Texas Railroad becoming part of the UP system as well as smaller ones.

=== Finances ===
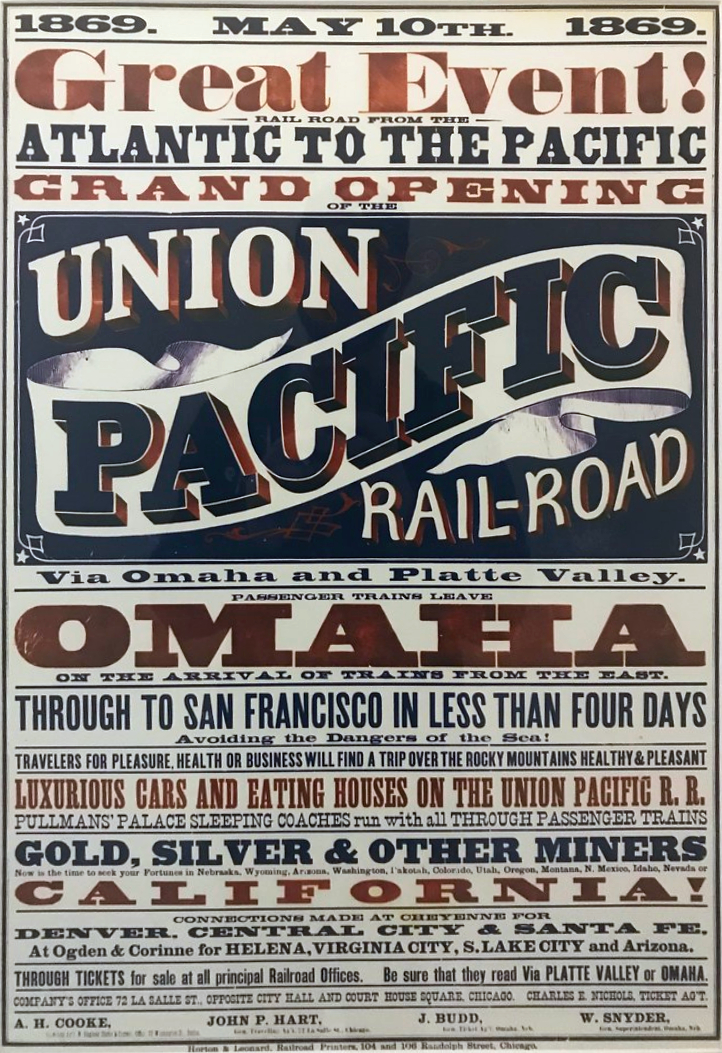
Poster for UP railroad opening-day, 1869.

The UPRR main line was completed in 1869, at a cost of $109 million ($2.64 billion in 2025). About $50 million was spent on the construction work. The rest included a profit of about $13–16 million to the owners, possibly several million dollars in bribes to Congressman and especially heavy discounts in the sale of bonds of a railroad that most investors thought would never make a profit. The original UPRR was entangled in the Crédit Mobilier scandal, exposed in 1872. Its independent construction company, the Crédit Mobilier, had bribed congressmen. The UPRR itself was not guilty but it did get bad publicity.

The Panic of 1873 another financial crisis, led to financial troubles but not bankruptcy. Jay Gould took control in 1873 and built a viable railroad that depended on shipments by local farmers and ranchers. Gould immersed himself in every operational and financial detail of the system. He built up encyclopedic knowledge, then acted decisively to shape its destiny. "He revised its financial structure, waged its competitive struggles, captained its political battles, revamped its administration, formulated its rate policies and promoted the development of resources along its lines.". Gould created the new Union Pacific Railway and merged the original UPRR, the Union Pacific Rail Road, into the new Union Pacific Railway.

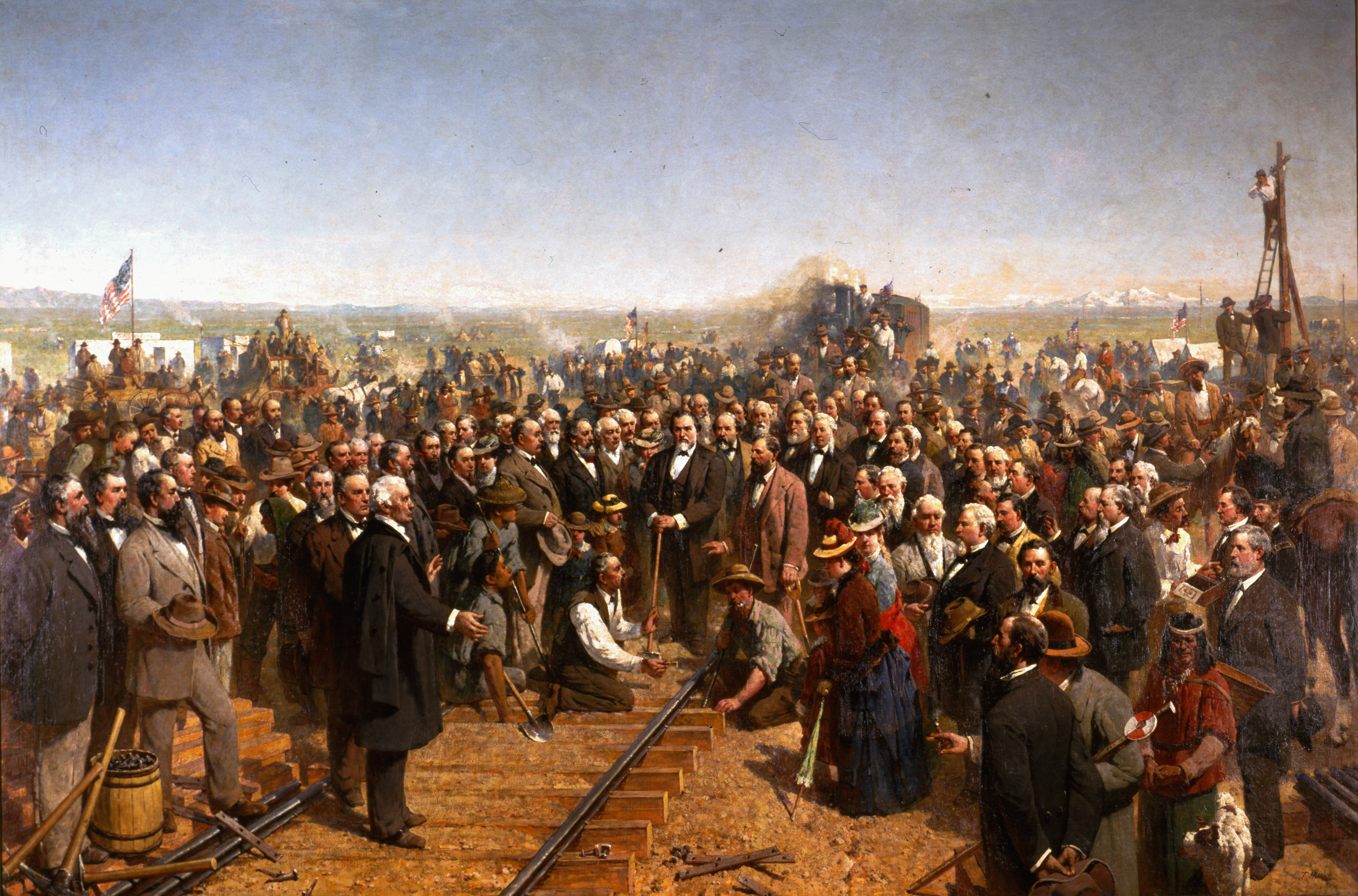
The Last Spike, by Thomas Hill, (1881).

After Gould's death, the Union Pacific Railway slipped and declared bankruptcy during the Panic of 1893. Yet in November 1897 the national economy was quickly reviving and profitability was at hand. An agreement was reached to pay the US Treasury the entire amount of principle and accrued interest on the bonds. The government received every dollar it wanted from the Union Pacific.

In 1897, a new Union Pacific Railroad (UP) was formed and absorbed the Union Pacific Railway, this new railroad reverted to the original Union Pacific name of the original company but now pronounced "Railroad" and not "Rail Road".

E. H. Harriman bought the line cheaply, and made it much more efficient and highly profitable. He tried to incorporate it into a vast western system but the Supreme Court blocked his attempts as monopolistic.

=== Construction ===
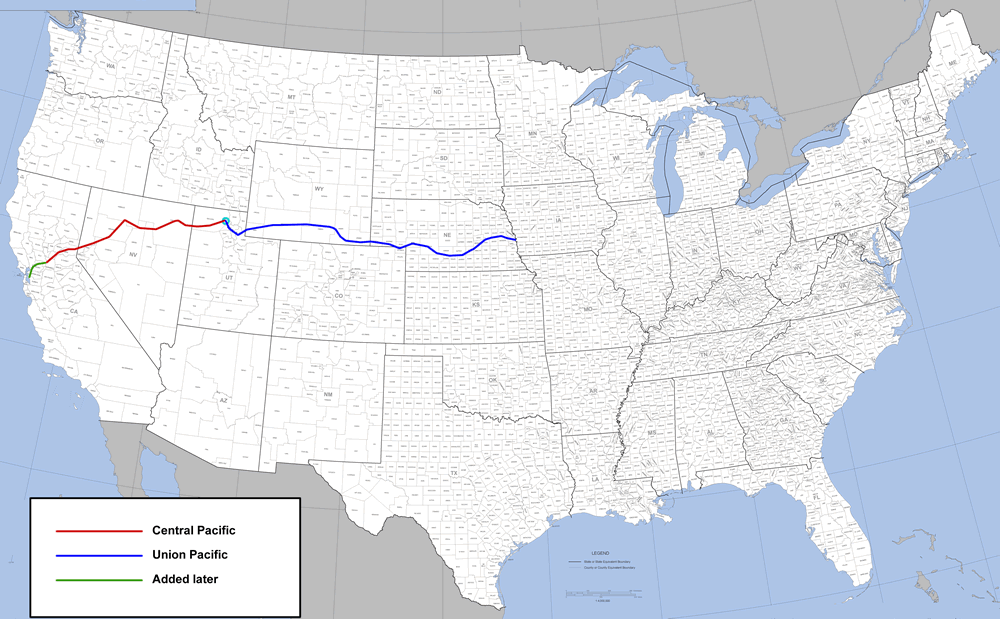
Route of the first American transcontinental: The Central Pacific (red) in the west and the Union Pacific (blue) met in Utah in 1869.

Thomas C. Durant had overall charge of the UPRR construction program. He selected routes on the basis of how cheap they were to construct, for that would maximize profits on the fixed congressional loans. He did not give emphasis to the long-term economic potential of the area served. He, therefore, vetoed the civil engineers who wanted to use the otherwise highly attractive South Pass route in Wyoming.

Building the line came in stages: first, the surveyors (often with Army protection) laid out the precise line to minimize the grade and the need for bridges and trestles. Then came the grading party with plows and shovels. Finally came the ties and the rails, along with the telegraph line, signals, sidings and switches. Starting in summer 1865 Omaha became the logistics base for thousands of tons of rails, ties, tools, and supplies. As soon as a few miles of track was ready, supplies were moved to a forward supply point, and teams of horse-drawn or mule-drawn wagons carried them to the work point. Eventually, the teams could lay several miles of track per day — the record was 10 miles. It was largely a pick-and-shovel and wheelbarrow job, with most of the unskilled work done by Irish immigrants.

The original UPRR 1,087 miles (1,749 km) of track started in Council Bluffs, Iowa. Winter and spring caused severe problems as the Missouri River froze over in the winter; but not well enough to support a railroad track plus train. The train ferries had to be replaced by sleighs each winter. Starting in 1873, the railroad traffic crossed the river over the new 2,750 feet (840 m) long, eleven span, Union Pacific Missouri River Bridge to Omaha, Nebraska.) The main line bridged the Elkhorn River and then crossed over the new 1,500 feet (460 m) Loup River bridge as it followed the north side of the Platte River valley west through Nebraska along the general path of the Oregon, Mormon and California Trails.

During the winter of 1865–66, former Union General John S. Casement, the new Chief Engineer, assembled men and supplies to push the railroad rapidly west. To protect the railroad's surveying and hunting parties, the U.S. Army instituted active cavalry patrols that grew larger as the Indians grew more aggressive. Temporary, "Hell on wheels" towns, made mostly of canvas tents, accompanied the railroad as construction headed west. Most faded away but some became permanent settlements.

The railroad bridged the North Platte River over a 2,600-foot-long (790 m) bridge at North Platte, Nebraska, in December 1866 after completing about 240 miles (390 km) of track that year. In late 1866, General Grenville M. Dodge was appointed Chief Engineer on the Union Pacific; Casement continued to work as chief construction boss and his brother Daniel Casement continued as financial officer. The North Platte/South Pass route was popular with wagon trains but not attractive to the railroad, for it was about 150 miles (240 km) longer and much more expensive to construct up the narrow, steep and rocky canyons of the North Platte. By 1867, a new route was found and surveyed that went along part of the South Platte River in western Nebraska and after entering what is now the state of Wyoming, ascended a gradual sloping ridge between Lodgepole Creek and Crow Creek to 8,200 feet (2,500 m) Evans pass was discovered in 1864. From North Platte, Nebraska (elevation 2,834 feet (864 m)), the railroad proceeded westward and upward along a new path across the Nebraska Territory and Wyoming Territory along the north bank of the South Platte River and into what later become the state of Wyoming at Lone Pine, Wyoming. Evan's Pass was located between the new railroad towns of Cheyenne, Wyoming, and Laramie, Wyoming. The new route surveyed across Wyoming was over 150 miles (240 km) shorter, had a flatter profile, allowed for cheaper and easier railroad construction, and also went closer by Denver and the known coalfields in the Wasatch and Laramie Ranges. The railroad gained about 3,200 feet (980 m) in the 220 miles (350 km) climb to Cheyenne from North Platte, Nebraska—about 15 feet (4.6 m) per mile (1.6 km)--a very gentle slope of less than one degree average. This "new" route had never become an emigrant route because it lacked the water and grass to feed the emigrants' oxen and mules. Steam locomotives did not need grass, and the railroad drilled wells for water. Coal was mined in Wyoming by the time the UP arrived. Coal shipments by rail were also looked on as a potentially major source of income—this potential is still being realized, as Wyoming is the nation's largest coal producer in the 21st century.

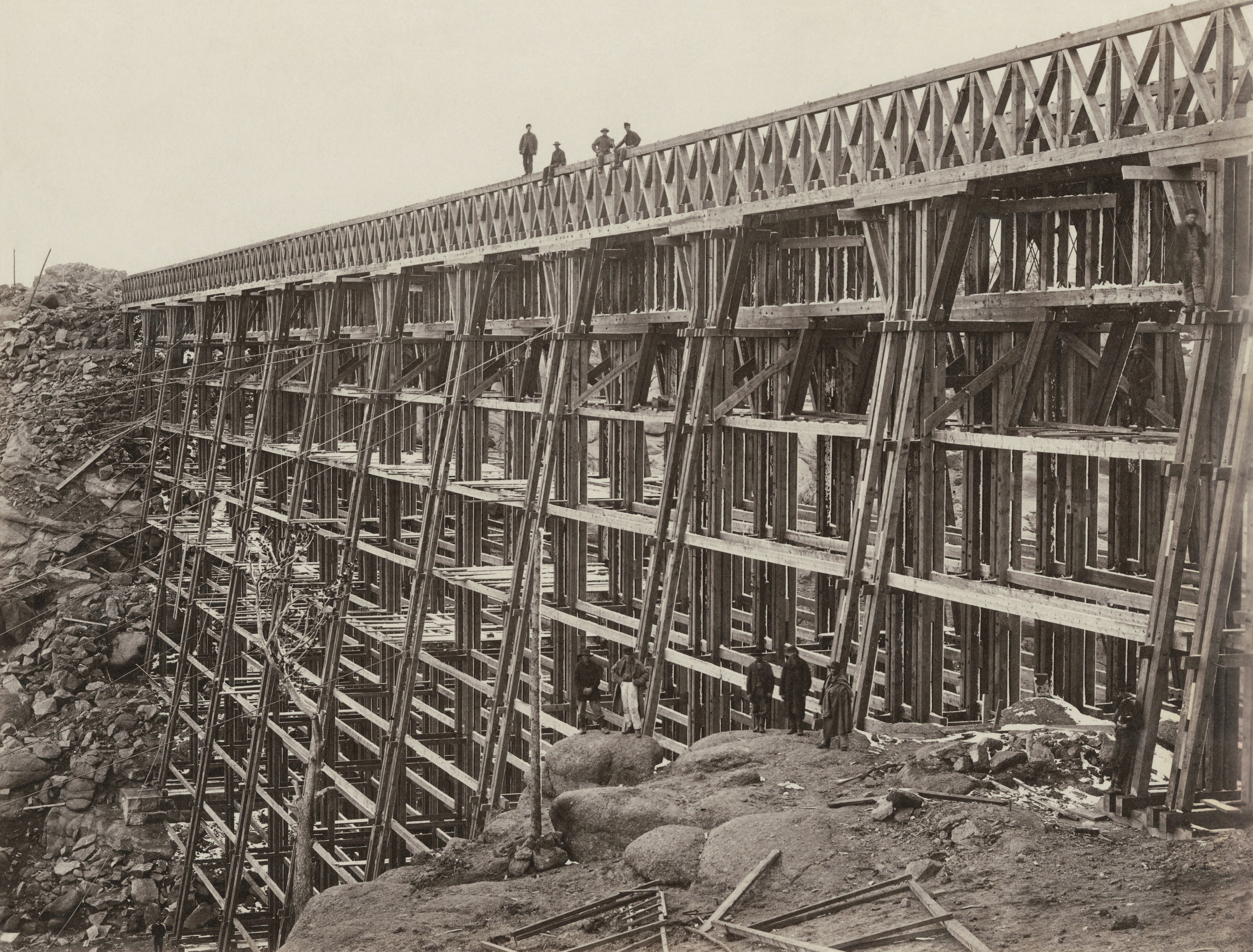
Dale Creek Bridge

The original Union Pacific reached the new railroad town of Cheyenne in December 1867, having laid about 270 miles (430 km) that year. They paused over the winter, preparing to push the track over Evans' (Sherman's) pass. At 8,247 feet (2,514 m), Evans/Sherman's pass is the highest point reached on the transcontinental railroad. The Dale Creek Crossing bridge was one of their more difficult railroad engineering challenges. Located 35 miles (56 km) from Evans pass, UP connected to Denver and its Denver Pacific Railway and Telegraph Company railroad line in 1870. Cheyenne became a major railroad center and was equipped with extensive railroad yards, maintenance facilities and a Union Pacific presence. Its location made it a good base for helper locomotives to couple to trains with snowplows to clear the tracks of winter snow or help haul heavy freight over Evan's pass. The Union Pacific's junction with the Denver Railroad with its connection to Kansas City, Kansas, Kansas City, Missouri and the railroads east of the Missouri River again increased Cheyenne's importance as the junction of two major railroads.

The railroad established towns along the way: Fremont, Elkhorn, Grand Island, North Platte, Ogallala, Sidney, Nebraska as the railroad followed the Platte River across Nebraska territory. Interstate 80 now follows nearly the same route. In the Dakota Territory (Wyoming) it built the new towns of Laramie, Rawlins and Evanston, Wyoming, as well as many more fuel and water stops. The Green River was bridged on October 1, 1868—the last big river to cross. Evanston became a significant train maintenance shop town equipped to carry out extensive repairs on the cars and steam locomotives.

In the Utah Territory, the railroad once again diverted from the main emigrant trails to cross the Wasatch Mountains and went down the rugged Echo Canyon (Summit County, Utah) and Weber River canyon. To speed up construction as much as possible, Union Pacific contracted several thousand Mormon workers to cut, fill, trestle, bridge, blast and tunnel its way down the rugged Weber River Canyon to Ogden, Utah ahead of the railroad construction. The Mormon and Union Pacific rail work was joined in the area of the present-day border between Utah and Wyoming. The longest of four tunnels built in Weber Canyon was 757-foot-long (231 m) Tunnel 2. The tunnels were all made with the new nitroglycerine explosive which expedited work but caused some fatal accidents.

The tracks reached Ogden on March 27, 1869; then skirted north of the Great Salt Lake to Brigham City and Corinne, Utah, before finally connecting with the Central Pacific Railroad at Promontory Summit in Utah territory on May 10, 1869.

=== Expansion ===
In the 1860s, the original UP purchased three short Mormon-built roads: the Utah Central Railroad extending south from Ogden to Salt Lake City, the Utah Southern Railroad extending south from Salt Lake City into the Utah Valley, and the Utah Northern Railroad extending north from Ogden into Idaho. It built or purchased local lines that gave it access to key locations: Denver, Colorado, Portland, Oregon, and to the Pacific Northwest. It acquired the Kansas Pacific (originally called the Union Pacific, Eastern Division, though an entirely separate railroad). It also owned narrow gauge trackage into the mining districts high in the Colorado rockies and a standard gauge line south from Denver across New Mexico into Texas.

=== Business standards ===
Jan Richard Heier argues that, "America's greatest technological achievement of the nineteenth century" was the transcontinental railroad. He adds that the political scandal over the disposition of millions of dollars in government bonds led to Congressional hearings that showed the weakness of accounting methods. The reporting of assets, liabilities, and capital followed standards of the day. The companies had to invent new methods for accounting for stock dividends and bond discounts.

Congress distrusted the UP, and forced it to hire as the new president a distinguished member of the Adams family, Charles Francis Adams Jr. in 1884. Adams had long promoted various reform ideas, but had little practical experience in management. As railroad president, he was successful in getting a good press for the UP, and set up libraries along the route to allow his employees to better themselves. He had poor results dealing with the Knights of Labor labor union. When the Knights of Labor refuse extra work in Wyoming in 1885, Adams hired Chinese workers. The result was the Rock Springs massacre, that killed scores of Chinese, and drove all the rest out of Wyoming. He tried to build a complex network of alliances with other businesses, but they provided little help to the UP. He had great difficulty in making decisions, and in coordinating his subordinates. Adams was unable to stanch the worsening financial condition of the UP, and in 1890 Gould forced his resignation.

=== Land sales and settlers ===
In addition to charges for freight and passenger service, the UP made its money from land sales, especially to farmers and ranchers. The UP land grant gave it ownership of 12,800 acres per mile of finished track. The government kept every other section of land, so it also had 12,800 acres to sell or give away to homesteaders. The UP's goal was not to make a profit, but rather to build up a permanent clientele of farmers and townspeople who would form a solid basis for routine sales and purchases. The UP, like other major lines, opened sales offices in the East and in Europe, advertised heavily, and offered attractive package rates for farmer to sell out and move his entire family, and his tools, to the new destination. In 1870 the UP offered rich Nebraska farmland at five dollars an acre, with one fourth down and the remainder in three annual installments. It gave a 10 percent discount for cash. Farmers could also homestead land, getting it free from the federal government after five years, or even sooner by paying $1.50 an acre. Sales were improved by offering large blocks to ethnic colonies of European immigrants. Germans and Scandinavians, for example, could sell out their small farms back home and buy much larger farms for the same money. European ethnics comprised half of the population of Nebraska in the late 19th century. Married couples were usually the homesteaders, but single women were also eligible on their own.

== 20th century ==
=== Harriman ===
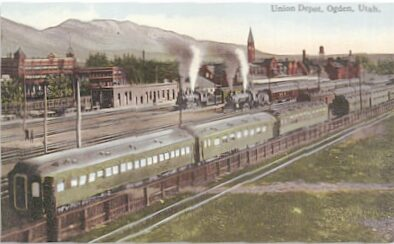
Passengers changed cars at Ogden, Utah, from Union Pacific to Southern Pacific, which took them to California, 1910

E. H. Harriman (1848-1909) in 1898 became chairman of the UP executive committee, and from that time until his death his word was law on the Union Pacific system. He merged the UP with the larger Southern Pacific in 1900 to obtain greater efficiency and more monopoly power in the Southwest. The Justice Department sued, and in 1912 the Supreme Court separated the two companies because the suppression of competition was in restraint of trade and violated the 1890 Sherman antitrust act.

=== 1920s ===
Labor unrest was generally low in the United States after the great strikes of 1919, but there was tension among the shopmen of the Union Pacific. The railroad cut wage rates in Las Vegas, Nevada, the site of major repair shops. On 1 July 1922, boilermakers, blacksmiths, electricians, carmen, and sheet metal workers went on strike. The over-the-rails workforce did not join them. Local public opinion at first favored the strikers. After episodes of violence by striking pickets, the railroad obtained a federal injunction restraining against threats or attacks. The railroad also threatened to move the maintenance facilities to more favorable city. Public support for the strike fell away. The strike collapsed in September, and union membership collapsed.

=== World War II ===
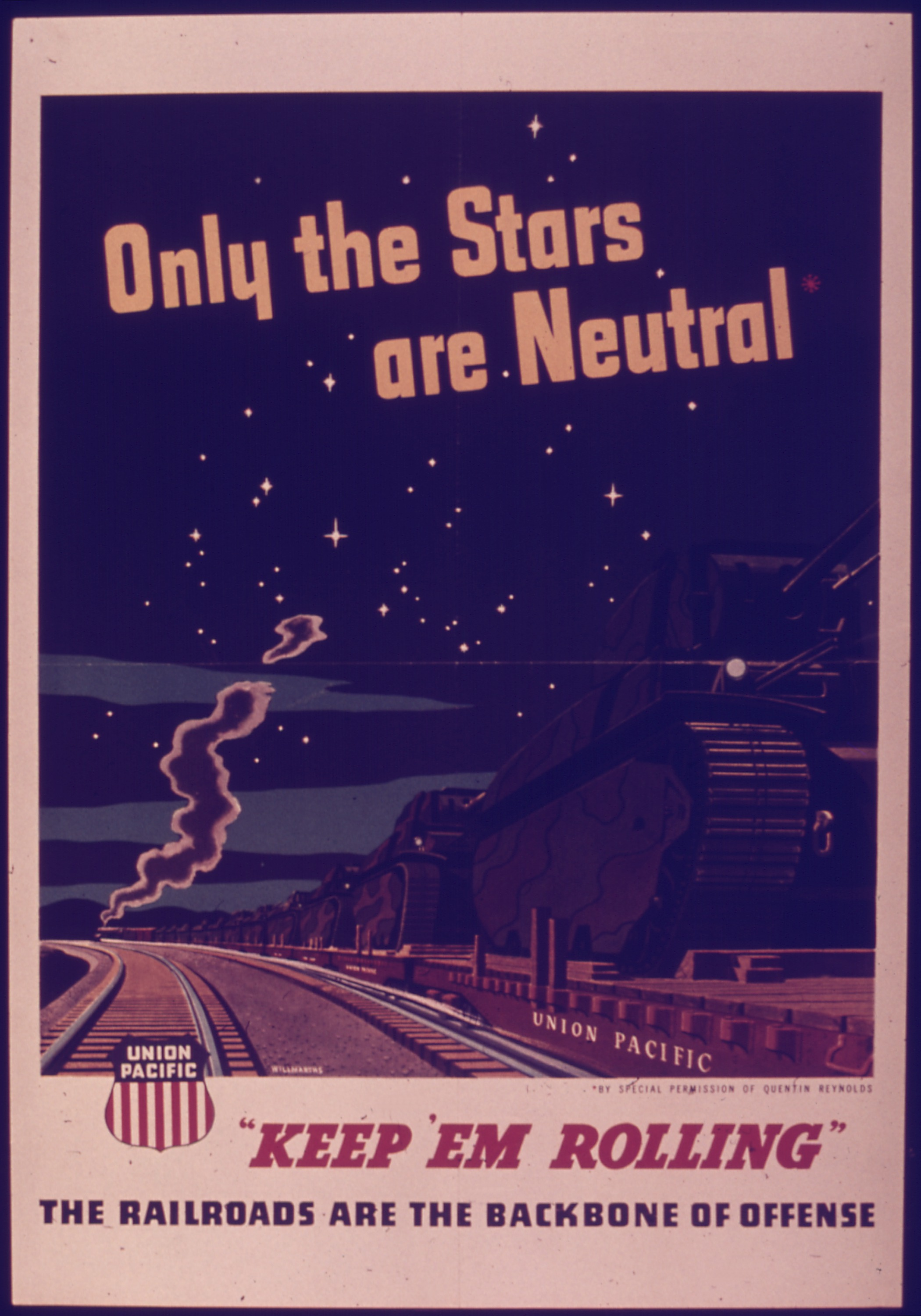
World War II propaganda poster showing off Union Pacific's involvement in wartime freight hauling

Union Pacific was noted for its patriotism during World War II. A Boeing B-17 Flying Fortress was named Spirit of the Union Pacific to recognize war bond contributions from Union Pacific employees. The plane was shot down over Germany in 1943, with most of its crew taken as prisoners of war.

=== Statistical trends ===
Revenue passenger traffic, in millions of passenger-miles
Year	Traffic
1925	1,065
1933	436
1944	5,481
1960	1,233
1970	333

In the tables "UP" includes OSL-OWR&N-LA&SL-StJ&G. 1925–1944 passenger-mile totals do not include Laramie North Park & Western, Saratoga & Encampment Valley, or Pacific & Idaho Northern, and none of the totals includes Spokane International or Mount Hood. From the ICC annual reports, except 1979 is from Moody's.

Revenue freight ton-miles (millions)
	UP	LNP&W	S&EV	P&IN
1925	12,869	10		3
1933	8,639	4	0.4	(into UP)
1944	37,126	7	0.7	
1960	33,280	(into UP)	(into UP)	
1970	47,575			
1979	73,708			

On December 31, 1925, UP-OSL-OWRN-LA&SL-StJ&GI operated 9,834 route-miles and 15,265 track-miles. At the end of 1980, Union Pacific operated 9,266 route-miles and 15,647 miles of track. Moody's shows 220,697 million revenue ton-miles in 1993 on the expanded system (17,835 route-miles at the end of the year).

== Former services ==
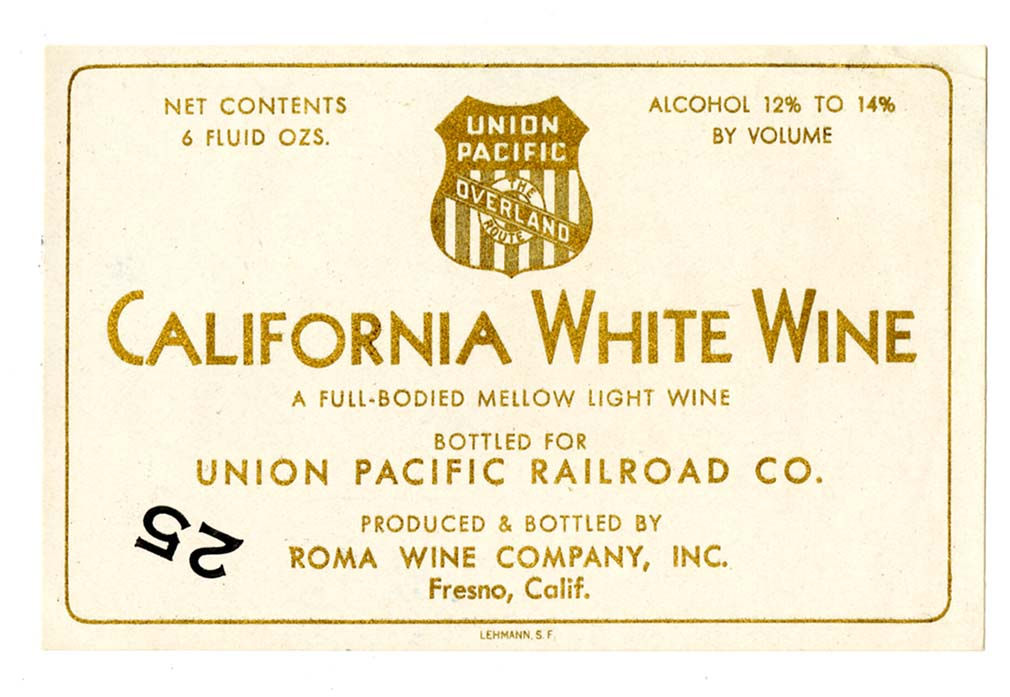
Wine label, Roma Wine Company, bottled for Union Pacific RR c. 1940s

Between 1869 and 1971, Union Pacific operated passenger service throughout its historic "Overland Route." The last passenger train operated by UP was the westbound City of Los Angeles, arriving at Los Angeles Union Station on May 2. Since then, Union Pacific has satisfied its common carrier requirements by hosting Amtrak trains (see § Hosted Amtrak trains). (Note: Merger partner D&RGW elected not to join Amtrak and continued operating the Rio Grande Zephyr until 1983.)

Named passenger trains once operated by Union Pacific include the following:

- Butte Special (operated between Salt Lake City and Butte, Montana)
- Challenger (operated jointly with the Chicago and North Western Railway until October 1955, and thereafter the Milwaukee Road)
- City of Denver (operated jointly with the Chicago and North Western Railway until October 1955, and thereafter the Milwaukee Road)
- City of Las Vegas; later, the Las Vegas Holiday Special (1956–1967)
- City of Los Angeles (operated jointly with the Chicago and North Western Railway until October 1955, and thereafter the Milwaukee Road)
- City of Portland (operated jointly with the Chicago and North Western Railway until October 1955, and thereafter the Milwaukee Road)
- City of Salina (1934–1940)
- City of San Francisco (operated jointly with the Chicago and North Western Railway and the Southern Pacific Railroad; after October, 1955 the Milwaukee Road assumed operation of the Chicago-Omaha leg of the service)
- City of St. Louis
- Columbine (in service to Chicago and Denver, beginning in the 1920s)
- Forty-Niner (operated between Chicago and Oakland)
- Gold Coast (operated between Chicago and Oakland/Los Angeles)
- Idahoan (operated between Cheyenne and Portland)
- Los Angeles Limited (in service 1905)
- Overland Flyer; renamed the Overland Limited in 1890 (1887–1963)
- Pacific Limited (operated between Chicago and Ogden, Utah where it was split to serve Los Angeles and San Francisco, beginning in 1913. It was combined with the Portland Rose in 1947.)
- Pony Express (operated between Kansas City and Los Angeles 1926–1954)
- Portland Rose (in service between Chicago and Portland, beginning in the 1920s)
- San Francisco Overland (originally operated between Chicago and Oakland, later terminated only at St. Louis)
- Spokane (operated between Spokane and Portland)
- Utahn (operated between Cheyenne and Los Angeles)
- Yellowstone Special (operated between Pocatello, Idaho and West Yellowstone, Montana)

== Historical Presidents ==
Presidents of all four incarnations of the Union Pacific Railroad:

- William Butler Ogden (1862–1863)
- John Adams Dix (1863–1865)
- Oliver Ames Jr. (1866–1871)
- Thomas Alexander Scott (1871–1872)
- Horace F. Clark (1872–1873)
- John Duff (1873–1874)
- Sidney Dillon (1874–1884)
- Charles F. Adams (1884–1890)
- Sidney Dillon (1890–1892)
- Silas H.H. Clark (1890–1898)
- W.S. Pierce (acting) (1897)
- Horace G. Burt (1898–1904)
- E. H. Harriman (1904–1909)
- Robert S. Lovett (1910–1911)
- A.L. Mohler (1911–1916)
- E.E. Calvin (1916–1918)
- C.B. Seger (1918–1919)
- Carl R. Gray (1920–1937)
- William M. Jeffers (1937–1946)
- G.F. Ashby (1946–1949)
- Arthur E. Stoddard (1949–1965)
- E.H. Bailey (1965–1971)
- John Kenefick (1971–1986)
- William S. Cook (1977–1987)
- Drew Lewis (1986–1987)
- Mike Walsh (1987–1991)
- Richard K. Davidson (1991–1996)
- Ron Burns (several months in 1996)
- Jerry Davis (1996–1998)
- Ike Evans (1998–2004)
- James R. Young (2004–2012)
- Jack Koraleski (2012–2015)
- Lance Fritz (2015–current)

== Historic locomotives ==
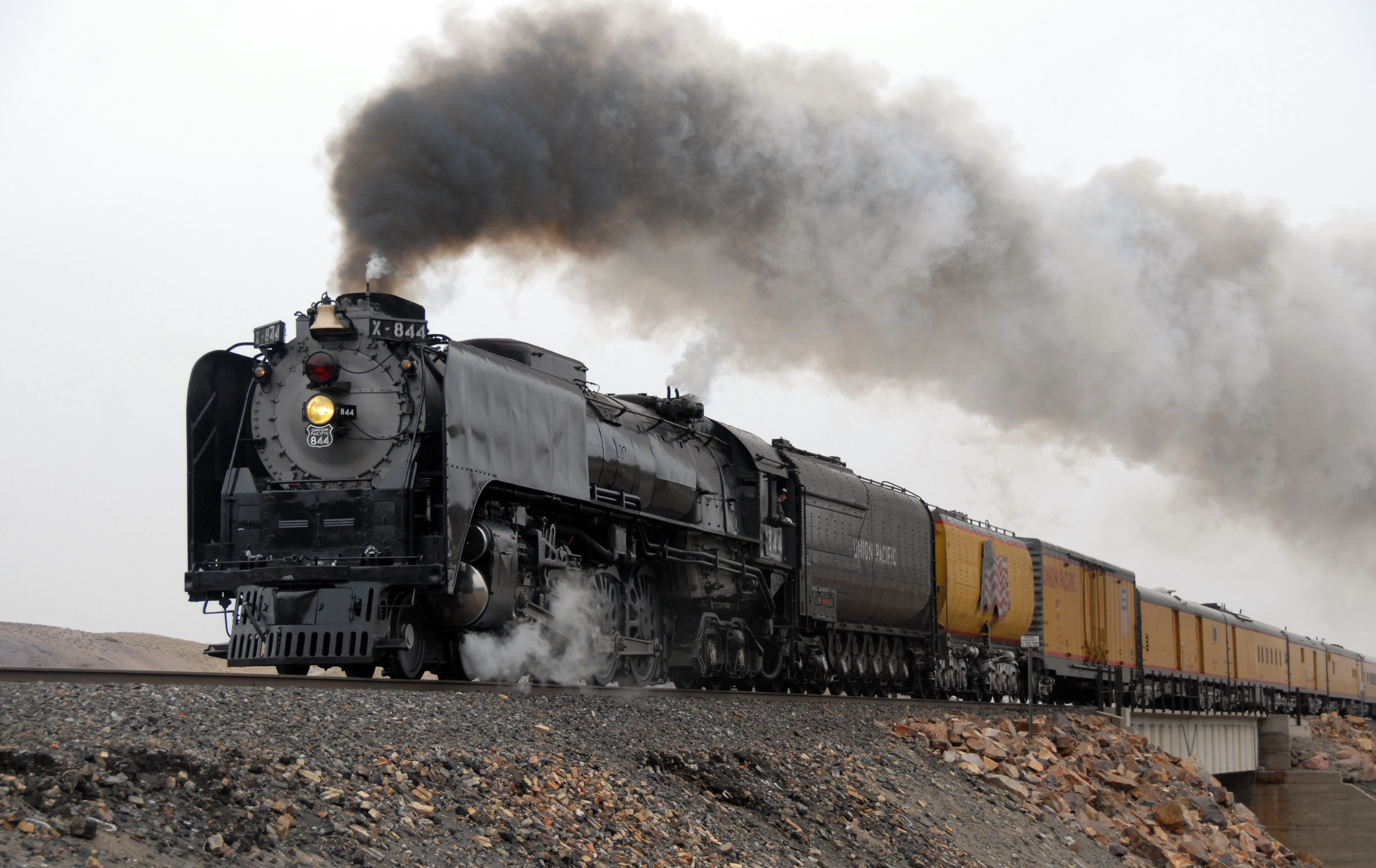
One of UP's steam locomotives hauls an excursion train through Painted Rocks, Nevada in 2009

The Union Pacific once operated a large fleet of steam and diesel locomotives. Alone among modern railroads, UP maintains several historic locomotives for special trains and for hire in its Cheyenne, Wyoming, roundhouse.

=== Steam ===
- UP 844 is a 4-8-4 Northern type express passenger steam locomotive (class FEF-3). It was the last steam locomotive built for UP and has been in continuous service since its 1944 delivery. Many people know the engine as the No. 8444, since an extra '4' was added to its number in 1962 to distinguish it from a diesel numbered in the 800 series. It regained its rightful number in June 1989, after the diesel was retired and donated to the Nevada Southern Railroad Museum in Boulder City, Nevada. Overhauled in 1996, it was taken out of service on June 24, 1999, after the collapse of boiler tubes made of the wrong material. It returned to service on November 10, 2004. It was rebuilt again in 2015 and returned to service in 2016. In addition to being one of UP's oldest locomotives, it is the only steam locomotive to never be officially retired from a North American Class I railroad.
- UP 4014 is a 4-8-8-4 Big Boy class freight steam locomotive. It is the largest operational steam locomotive in the world. Delivered in 1941, the locomotive operated in revenue service until it was withdrawn in 1961. It was donated in late 1961 to the RailGiants Train Museum in Pomona, California, where it became one of the eight Big Boys preserved around the United States. On July 23, 2013, UP announced that it would reacquire No. 4014 from the Southern California chapter of the Railway and Locomotive Historical Society in Pomona, with the goal of restoring it to service. In 2014, No. 4014 was moved from Pomona to the Union Pacific West Colton yard, then to Cheyenne. Restoration to full operating condition was completed in May 2019; its first excursion took place that month.

=== Diesel ===
UP 949, 951 and 963B are a trio of streamlined General Motors Electro-Motive Division E9 passenger locomotives built in 1955. They are used to haul the UP business cars during excursions and charter specials. Originally built in 1955, the original twin 1,200-hp 12-cylinder 567 series engines have been replaced with single EMD 16-645E 2000 hp (1.5 MW) engines and the electrical and control equipment similarly upgraded, making them more compatible with more modern locomotives. The set is made of two A units and one B unit, the latter which contains an HEP engine-generator set for powering passenger cars. The two A units have been modified to eliminate the nose doors to increase safety in a collision.

=== Preserved locomotives ===
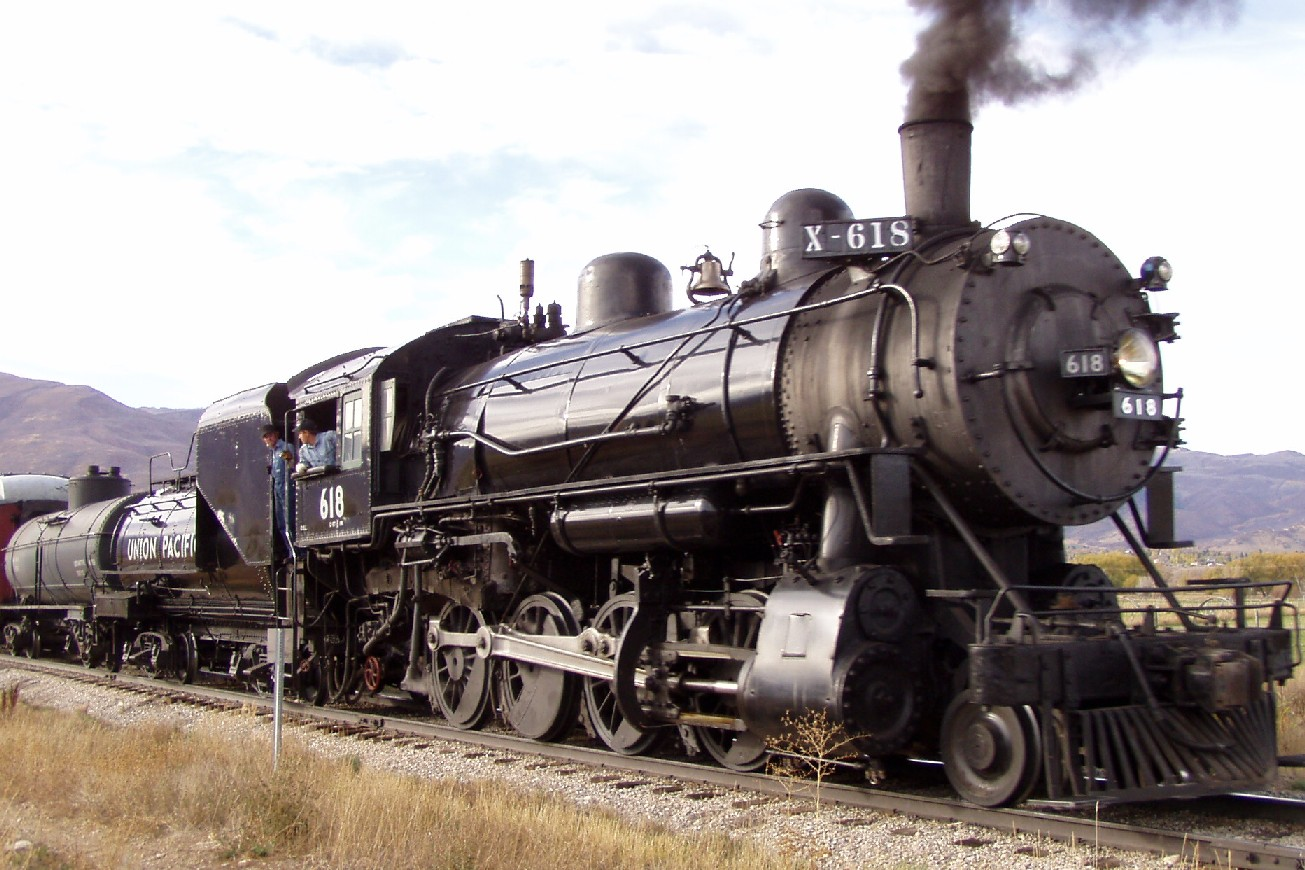
Union Pacific 618 operates at the Heber Valley Historic Railroad

In addition to the historic fleet outlined above kept by UP itself, a large number of UP locomotives survive elsewhere. Many locomotives were donated to towns along the Union Pacific tracks, for instance, as well as locomotives donated to museums.

- UP 18, 26. From 1948 to 1970, UP operated a series of gas turbine-electric locomotives. These were ultimately retired due to rising fuel costs. Two surviving GTELs can be seen on display; UP 18 is at the Illinois Railway Museum in Union, Illinois, and UP 26 is displayed at the Utah State Railroad Museum in Ogden, Utah.
- UP 119 – A 4-4-0 type. The original was scrapped, and this technically does not count as a preserved engine. However, a full-scale exact replica was built in 1979 and currently operates at the Golden Spike National Historic Site in Promontory, Utah.
- UP 407 – A 2-8-0 type, donated to City of Sidney, Nebraska in July 1956
- UP 421 – A 2-8-0 type, donated to City of Fairbury, Nebraska in April 1956
- UP 423 – A 2-8-0 type, donated to City of Gering, Nebraska in July 1955
- UP 428 – A 2-8-0 type, undergoing restoration at the Illinois Railway Museum, Union, Illinois
- UP 437 – A 2-8-0 type, donated to City of Grand Island, Nebraska in September 1955
- UP 440 – A 2-8-0 type, donated to City of Lincoln, Nebraska in May 1955, moved to Mid-Continent Railway Museum, North Freedom, Wisconsin in June 1975
- UP 460 – A 2-8-0 type, donated to City of Marysville, Kansas in April 1956
- UP 477 – A 2-8-0 type, donated to City of Salina, Kansas in July 1955
- UP 480 – A 2-8-0 type, donated to City of North Platte, Nebraska in February 1956
- UP 481 – A 2-8-0 type, on display at Buffalo County Historical Society, Kearney, Nebraska
- UP 485 – A 2-8-0 type, donated to City of Lexington, Nebraska in June 1956
- UP 529 – A 2-8-0 type, on display at Northwest Railway Museum, Snoqualmie, Washington
- UP 533 – A 2-8-0 type, donated to City of Rawlins, Wyoming in December 1958
- UP 561 – A 2-8-0 type, on display at Pawnee Park, Columbus, Nebraska
- UP 616 – A 2-8-0 type, donated to City of Nampa, Idaho in August 1958
- UP 618 – A 2-8-0 type, at the Heber Valley Historic Railroad
- UP 737 – A 4-4-0 type that was in the collection of Steamtown National Historic Site, then moved to the Feather River Railroad Museum in Portola, California. Currently displayed at the Double-T Agricultural Museum in Stevinson, California.
- UP 814 – A FEF-1 4-8-4 type, on display at Dodge Park, Council Bluffs, Iowa
- UP 833 – A FEF-2 4-8-4 type, on display at Eccles Rail Center, Utah State Railroad Museum Union Station, Ogden, Utah
- UP 942 – A EMD E8 type, on display and operation use at the Southern California Railway Museum
- UP 1242 – A 4-6-0 type, on display at Lions Park, Cheyenne, Wyoming
- UP 1243 – A 4-6-0 type, on display at the Durham Western Heritage Museum
- UP 2005 – A 2-8-2 type, on display at Ross Park, Pocatello, Idaho

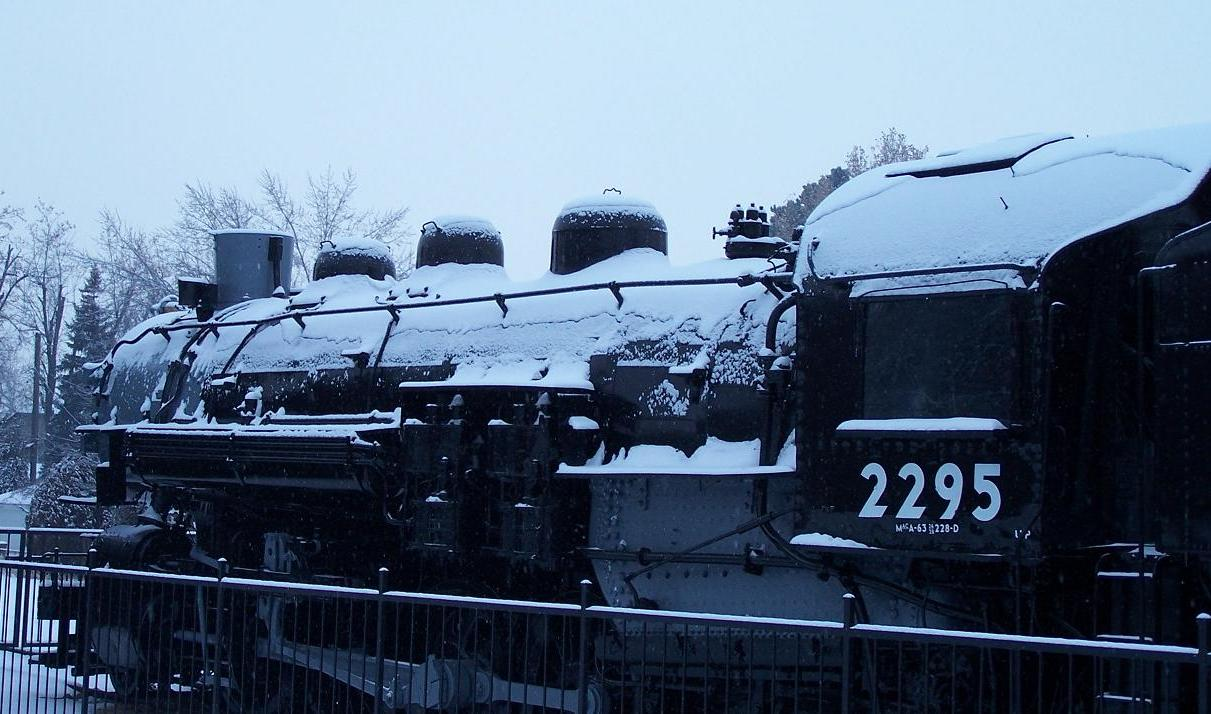
Union Pacific 2295, on display at Boise, Idaho, in 2009

- UP 2295 – A 2-8-2 type, on display at former UP passenger depot, Boise, Idaho
- UP 2537 – A 2-8-2 type, donated to City of Walla Walla, Washington in December 1959
- UP 2564 – A 2-8-2 type, originally on display in Oro Grande, California, May 1959, then moved to Orange Empire Railway Museum, Perris, California
- UP 3203 – A 4-6-2 type, donated to City of Portland, Oregon in January 1958. Originally Oregon Railway and Navigation Company No. 197, it was moved to the Brooklyn Roundhouse in 1996 and to the Oregon Rail Heritage Center in 2012, where it is now undergoing restoration.
- UP 3206 – A 4-6-2 type, originally on display at Highbridge Park in Spokane, Washington. Moved to Spokane Interstate Fairgrounds in 1978.
- UP 3977 – A 4-6-6-4 Challenger class dual-service steam locomotive. It is on static display in Cody Park in North Platte, Nebraska.
- UP 3985 – A 4-6-6-4 Challenger class dual-service steam locomotive. Restored in 1981, it operated in excursion service until being taken out of service in 2010. It was retired in 2020 and was stored in Cheyenne. In 2022, it was donated to the Railroading Heritage of Midwest America, where it is now being restored to operation.
- UP 4004 – A Union Pacific Big Boy 4-8-8-4 articulated steam locomotive, on display in Holiday Park, Cheyenne, Wyoming
- UP 4005 – A Union Pacific Big Boy 4-8-8-4 articulated steam locomotive, on display at Forney Transportation Museum, Denver, Colorado
- UP 4006 – A Union Pacific Big Boy 4-8-8-4 articulated steam locomotive, on display at National Museum of Transport, St. Louis, Missouri

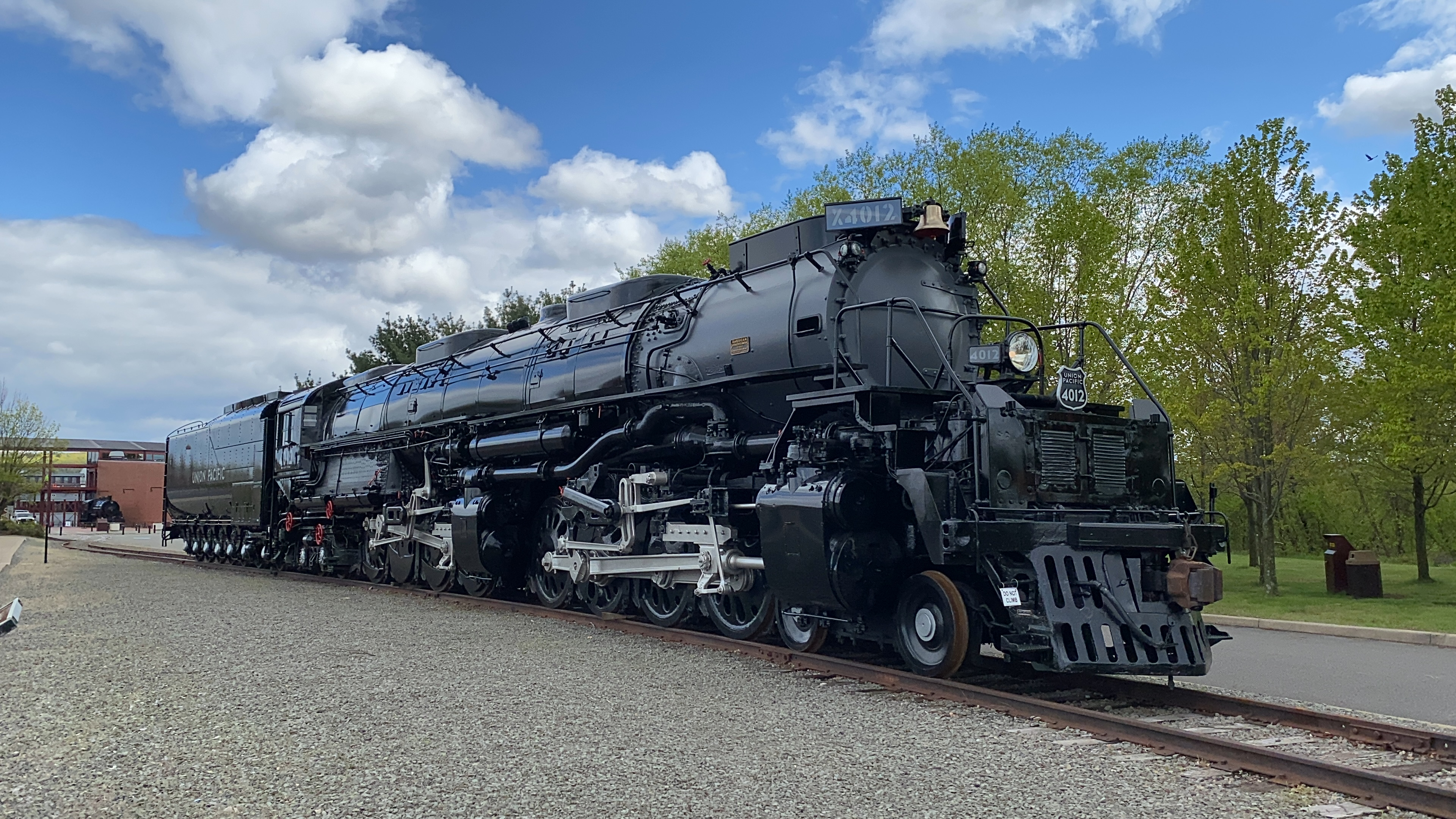
The Union Pacific "Big Boy"#4012

- UP 4012 – A Union Pacific Big Boy 4-8-8-4 articulated steam locomotive which has been at a museum at Steamtown, Scranton, Pennsylvania since 1984
- UP 4017 – A Union Pacific Big Boy 4-8-8-4 articulated steam locomotive, on display at National Railroad Museum, Green Bay, Wisconsin
- UP 4018 – A Union Pacific Big Boy 4-8-8-4 articulated steam locomotive, originally on display at Texas State Fair Grounds, Dallas, Texas. Now resides at the Museum of the American Railroad in Frisco, TX.
- UP 4023 – A Union Pacific Big Boy 4-8-8-4 articulated steam locomotive, on display at Lauritzen Gardens/Kenefick Park, Omaha, Nebraska
- UP 4420 – A 0-6-0 type, donated to City of Evanston, Wyoming, in June 1958
- UP 4436 – A 0-6-0 type, on display at Eccles Rail Center, Utah State Railroad Museum Union Station, Ogden, Utah
- UP 4439 – A 0-6-0 type, on display at Griffith Park, Los Angeles
- UP 4442 – A 0-6-0 type, donated to City of Las Vegas in April 1960, since moved to the Clark County Museum in Henderson, Nevada
- UP 4455 – A 0-6-0 type, operated by the Laramie Portland Cement plant hauling limestone from the quarry southwest of Laramie, Wyoming until 1965, then to Colorado Railroad Museum for display
- UP 4466 – A 0-6-0 type built by Lima Locomotive Works in 1920, displayed at the California State Railroad Museum. It operated at the museum until 1999.
- UP 5511 – A 2-10-2 type, previously stored in the Cheyenne, WY roundhouse. Donated in 2022 to the Railroading Heritage of Midwest America. It will be restored to operation after 3985.
- UP 6051 – A 2-8-0 type, on display at Fairmount park, Riverside, California
- UP 6072 – A 2-8-0 type, on display at Ft. Riley Museum, Ft. Riley, Kansas
- UP 6237 – A 2-8-0 type, donated to City of Hastings, Nebraska in July 1956
- UP 6264 – A 2-8-0 type, on display at Nevada Southern Railroad Museum, Boulder City, Nevada
- UP 6535 – A 2-8-0 type, on display at Depot Park, Laramie, Wyoming
- UP 6900 Centennial series – Several DDA40X diesel-electric locomotives have been saved, including 6936, which operated in excursion service until 2016. In 2022, it was donated to the Railroading Heritage of Midwest America. None of the remaining Centennials currently operate, but the RRHMA plans to bring 6936 back to operation.
- UP 9000 – A Union Pacific 9000 class 4-12-2 giant non-articulated freight locomotive, at the Fairplex in Pomona, California

== See also ==
- American frontier
- Gilded Age
- History of rail transport in the United States
- Railroad land grants in the United States
