= Union Pacific 4012 =

Preserved American 4-8-8-4 steam locomotive

Coordinates: 41°24′30.68″N 75°40′18.09″W

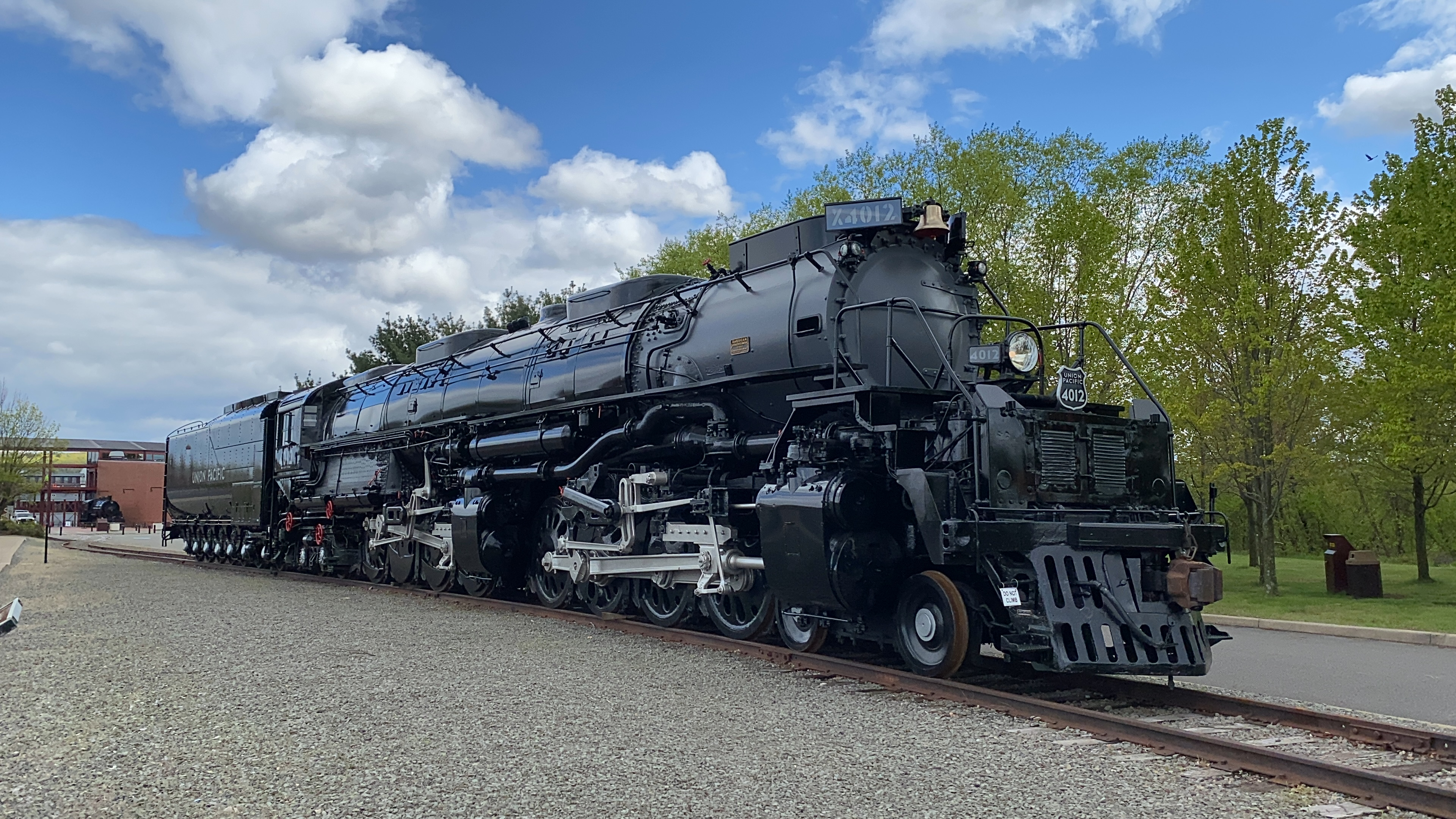
- Union Pacific No. 4012 on display at the Steamtown National Historic Site in May 2021
Type and origin
- Power type: Steam
- Builder: American Locomotive Company (Schenectady Works)
- Serial number: 69583
- Build date: November 1941
Specifications
- Configuration
  - Whyte: 4-8-8-4
  - UIC: (2′D)D2′ h4
- Gauge: 4 ft 8 1/2 in (1,435 mm)
- Leading dia.: 36 in (914 mm)
- Driver dia.: 68 inches (170 cm)
- Trailing dia.: 42 in (1,067 mm)
- Minimum curve: 288 ft (88 m) radius/ 20°
- Wheelbase: Locomotive: 72 ft 5.5 in (22.09 m); Overall: 117 ft 7 in (35.84 m)
- Length: Locomotive: 85 ft 7.8 in (26.11 m); Overall: 132 ft 9 7/8 in (40.48 m)
- Width: 11 ft (3.4 m)
- Height: 16 ft 2 1/2 in (4.94 m)
- Axle load: 67,500 lb (30,617 kilograms)
- Adhesive weight: 540,000 lb (244,940 kilograms)
- Loco weight: 762,000 lb (345,637 kilograms)
- Tender weight: 342,200 lb (155,219 kilograms) (2/3 load)
- Total weight: 1,250,000 lb (566,990 kilograms)
- Tender type: 25-C
- Fuel type: Coal
- Water cap.: 24,000 US gal (91,000 L; 20,000 imp gal)
- Firebox
  - Grate area: 150 sq ft (14 m^{2})
- Boiler: 95 in (2,400 mm)
- Boiler pressure: 300 lbf/in^{2} (2.1 MPa)
- Heating surface
  - Firebox: 704 sq ft (65 m^{2})
  - Tubes and flues: 5,185 sq ft (482 m^{2})
  - Total surface: 5,889 sq ft (547 m^{2})
- Superheater
  - Type: Type E
  - Heating area: 2,466 sq ft (229 m^{2})
- Cylinders: Four, outside
- Cylinder size: 23.75 in × 32 in (603 mm × 813 mm)
- Loco brake: Air
- Train brakes: Air
- Couplers: Knuckle
Performance figures
- Maximum speed: 80 mph (130 km/h)
- Power output: 5,300–7,000 hp (4,000–5,200 kW) @ 41 mph
- Tractive effort: 135,375 lbf (602.18 kN)
- Factor of adh.: 3.99
Career
- Operators: Union Pacific Railroad
- Class: 4884-1
- Numbers: UP 4012
- Nicknames: Big Boy
- First run: 1941
- Last run: 1959
- Retired: 1962
- Restored: May 5, 2021 (cosmetically)
- Disposition: On static display

Union Pacific 4012 is a 4884-1 class 4-8-8-4 "Big Boy" type steam locomotive, one of eight preserved Union Pacific Big Boy locomotives. Built in November 1941 by the American Locomotive Company at its Schenectady Locomotive Works of Schenectady, New York, No. 4012 was retired in 1962 and donated to Steamtown, U.S.A, in Bellows Falls, Vermont, and later moved to Steamtown National Historic Site in Scranton, Pennsylvania, where it remains today.

== History ==
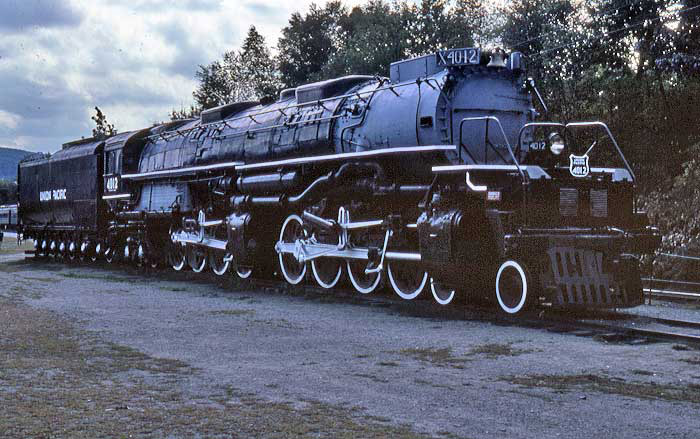
No. 4012 on display at Steamtown USA in Bellow Falls, Vermont

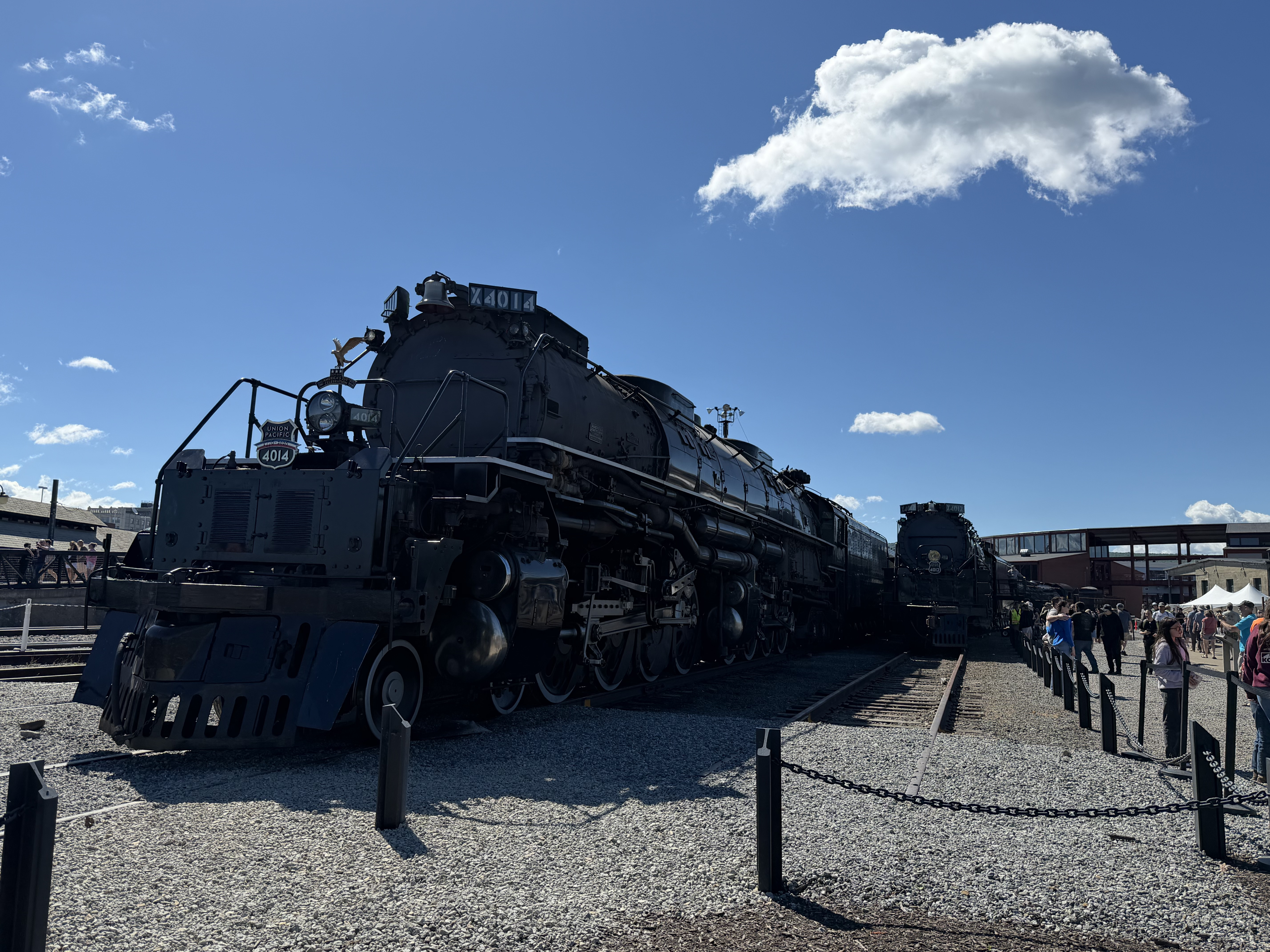
No. 4012 (right) on display with operational sibling No. 4014 in June 2026

Union Pacific 4012, nicknamed "Big Boy", is a 4-8-8-4 type locomotive built by American Locomotive Company in November 1941. It is among the world's largest steam locomotives. One of 25 built, No. 4012 is one of eight of its type to survive the advent of the diesel era. Referred to as an "articulated" locomotive, because it has more than one set of drivers, Big Boy weighs 1,250,000 pounds (570,000 kg). This locomotive worked for 21 years hauling freight between Cheyenne, Wyoming, and Ogden, Utah, logging over 1,000,000 miles (1,600,000 km) before its retirement in 1962.

No. 4012 was offered to Steamtown, U.S.A. along with a 4-6-6-4 Challenger and an office car. Steamtown founder F. Nelson Blount, faced with space limitations at Steamtown in 1962, could only accept the 4012. The Big Boy was on display at Bellows Falls, Vermont, until 1984, when Steamtown moved to Scranton, Pennsylvania. Since the Steamtown turntable and roundhouse are too small to accommodate the size and weight of 4012, it has remained outdoors since its arrival at Scranton.

The Steamtown Special History Study recommended that this locomotive remain at Steamtown because it is the only articulated locomotive in the Steamtown U.S.A. collection and suggested that due to its good condition, 4012 could be restored to working order. However, the study also recommended that 4012 remain on static display, because it is doubtful that the "track, switches, culverts, trestles, bridges, wyes, turntables, and other facilities that would have to carry it [could] bear its great weight".

On October 2, 2019, No. 4012 was removed from public display to begin a cosmetic restoration, including asbestos removal and repainting. The cosmetic restoration was completed on May 5, 2021, and the locomotive was returned to static display for National Train Day. As of 2026, No. 4012 still remains on static display at Steamtown National Historic Site in Scranton, Pennsylvania.

From June 15 and 30, 2026, No. 4012 was displayed alongside operational Big Boy No. 4014, which was making a coast-to-coast tour to celebrate the United States’ 250th anniversary.
