= Forney Transportation Museum =

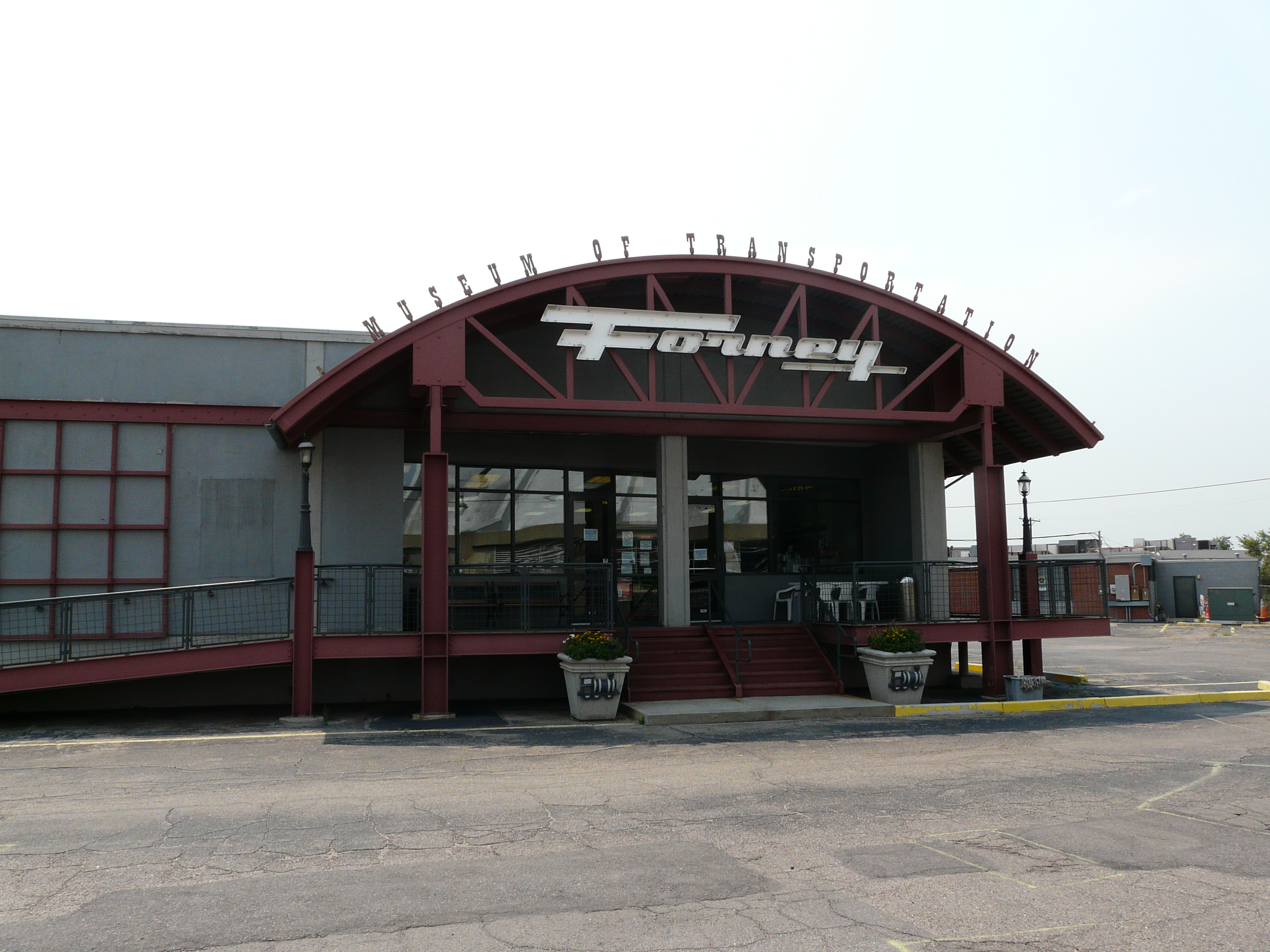
- Established: 1955
- Location: 4303 Brighton Boulevard; Denver, Colorado 80216
- Coordinates: 39.777134°N 104.970591°W
- Type: Transportation museum
- Director: Christof Kheim
- Public transit access: Bus Route 48: East 48th Ave./Commerce City, RTD
- Website: http://www.forneymuseum.org/

The Forney Transportation Museum is a transportation museum located in Denver, Colorado.

It is named after the founder, J.D. Forney, who started Forney Industries, Inc., in Fort Collins.

== Collection ==
The museum maintains a collection of approximately 800 exhibits. Its early years were focused on antique automobiles but the focus soon expanded to other modes of transport. The museum has a slogan, "Experience Transportation History". They feature, among others, the following items:

- Amelia Earhart's "Gold Bug" Kissel.
- Union Pacific Big Boy 4-8-8-4 Steam Locomotive Number 4005 which is one of the 8 surviving Big Boys since the end of revenue steam on the UP.
- Chicago & Northwestern Class R-1 4-6-0 Ten Wheeler number 444 which is the only surviving C&NW steam engine to burn oil.
- A Forney locomotive; (Cora-Texas Plantation Co. 0-4-4T No. 1) locomotive designer Matthias N. Forney was a second cousin to the museum founder, J.D. Forney.
- Union Pacific Rotary Snowplow 900099 was used to clear snow on the track.
- Denver & Rio Grande Western GP30 number 3006 operated various freight trains through the Rocky Mountains
- Henschel 0-4-0T locomotive NR-7, operated by Danish construction contractor Carl Nielsen. Operated on 750mm gauge track throughout Denmark.

== History ==
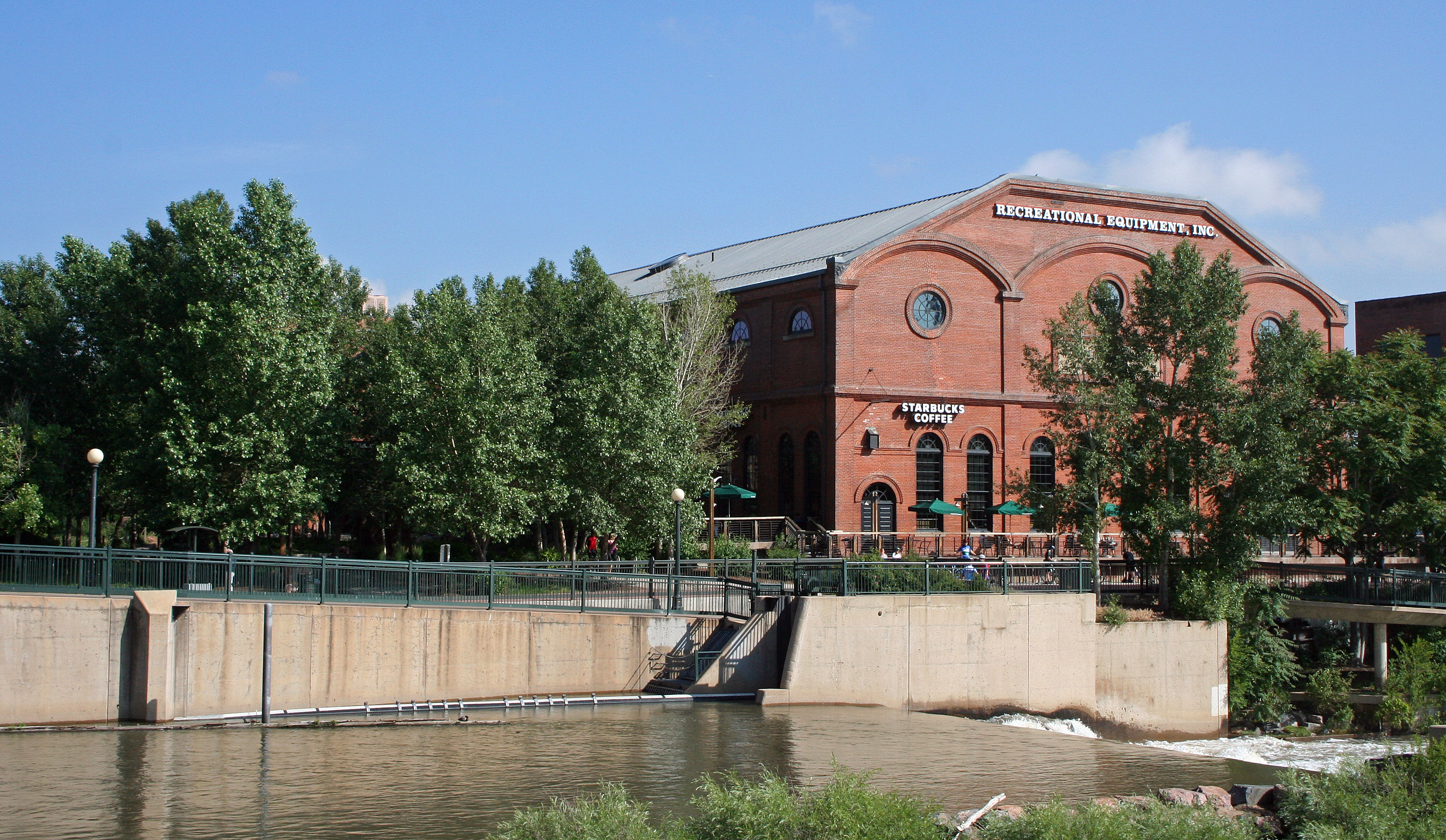
Previous location of the Forney Transportation Museum(now a REI store) which was housed in the historic Denver Tramway Powerhouse.

The Forney Museum of Transportation began as a private collection and has expanded into one of the finest transportation collections in the country. Mr. J.D. Forney, founder of Forney Industries in Ft. Collins, Colorado, became interested in antique and classic cars after his wife and children gave him a 1921 Kissel yellow Tourister, the same model he used to court his wife Rae.

Forney Industries has produced many products such as the Fornaire F-1 Aircoupe developed by Forney Aircraft Companyairplane, a central vacuum system and portable vacuum cleaner, auto generators, and battery chargers, but the best-known products are the different models of electric welders and welding supplies.

Mr. Forney started taking in old cars and carriages as trades on some of the welder sales. In 1955 the Forney Museum was started in Fort Collins, Colorado. In 1964 it became recognized as a 501(c)(3) non-profit organization.

== Locomotives ==
Union Pacific Big Boy number #4005 Built by the American Locomotive Company in 1941 is one of the few remaining examples of the world's largest steam locomotives, a 4-8-8-4 type, Only 25 were ever constructed, & 8 survived (7 on display: 4004, 4005, 4006, 4012, 4017, 4018, & 4023, & 1 in operational condition: 4014). The #4005 was briefly converted to oil fuel from 1946 to 1948, and was also involved in a fatal wreck on April 27, 1953.

The Forney locomotive was designed and patented by Matthias Forney, and this "Forney" tank-type of engine was built by several manufacturers. The one displayed at the Forney Museum of Transportation: Cora-Texas Plantation Co. 0-4-4T No. 1 was built by Porter in Pittsburgh, Pennsylvania, in 1897. This type of engine was commonly used on elevated railways, such as the New York Elevated Railway, the Brooklyn Elevated, and the Chicago Elevated. They were called the "Little Giants," and more than 500 were in service around 1900 hauling both freight and passengers. Steam-powered engines on the elevateds lasted only a few years, as they were replaced by the new electric engines. Forney engines were then sold off to buyers all over the world for mining, lumber, plantations, and short-haul freight and passengers. The Forney locomotives hauled both freight and passengers in the Denver area. The Denver, Lakewood and Golden Railway and the Denver Circle Railroad were the best known systems using this model.

Chicago & Northwestern Class R-1 4-6-0 10 Wheeler number 444 was built in 1906, and it was converted to burn oil in 1925. It last served the C&NW as a switcher in Belle Fourche, before it was retired in 1956. It was left in storage inside a roundhouse in Chadron, Nebraska, until June 1958, when it was acquired by William B. Heckman, the owner of the Black Hills Central Railroad. Crews from the C&NW and the Chicago, Burlington and Quincy Railroad (CB&Q) worked to move No. 444 under its own power from Chadron to the Black Hills Central's location in Hill City, South Dakota. In Hill City, South Dakota Governor Joe Foss performed a Golden Spike ceremony, in commemoration of the locomotive's arrival. It was moved to a siding near the end of the Black Hills Central's line for display. Since 1968, the only surviving C&NW steam engine to burn oil remains on display at Denver. Aside from 444, 2 more of the R-1 Class 10 wheelers survive: 175 in Owosso Michigan, & 1385 at North Freedom Wisconsin which both of them are under restoration back to operational condition.

UP 900099 was built in 1909 as stock, held at Cooke until sold to LHP&P 099, then it got renumbered to LNP&W 099; Moved to UP in December 1951 where it was renumbered to UP 099; & as 8 years have past, the plow was renumbered to UP 900099 in February 1959. After the Leslie Type Rotary itself was retired by UP in October 1969; the plow has since been donated to Museum.

Locomotive NR-7 was built in 1930 at the Henschel & Sohn shops in Kassel, Germany. The engine operated throughout Denmark for a construction contractor, mostly of bridges, including the. The engine was moved to America in 1961, and was purchased by a man named Arthur Seifert. Seifert planned on using the locomotive for a Disneyland style resort, however, this never materialized. The engine was purchased by J.D. Forney in 1962, and between 1962 and 1967, NR-7 was on display at Fort Collins. Since 1968, the locomotive has been sitting in Denver where it resides today."

== Visiting ==
The museum is located in Denver, Colorado. The facility has 70,000 square feet (6,500 m^{2}) open to the public.

== Gallery ==
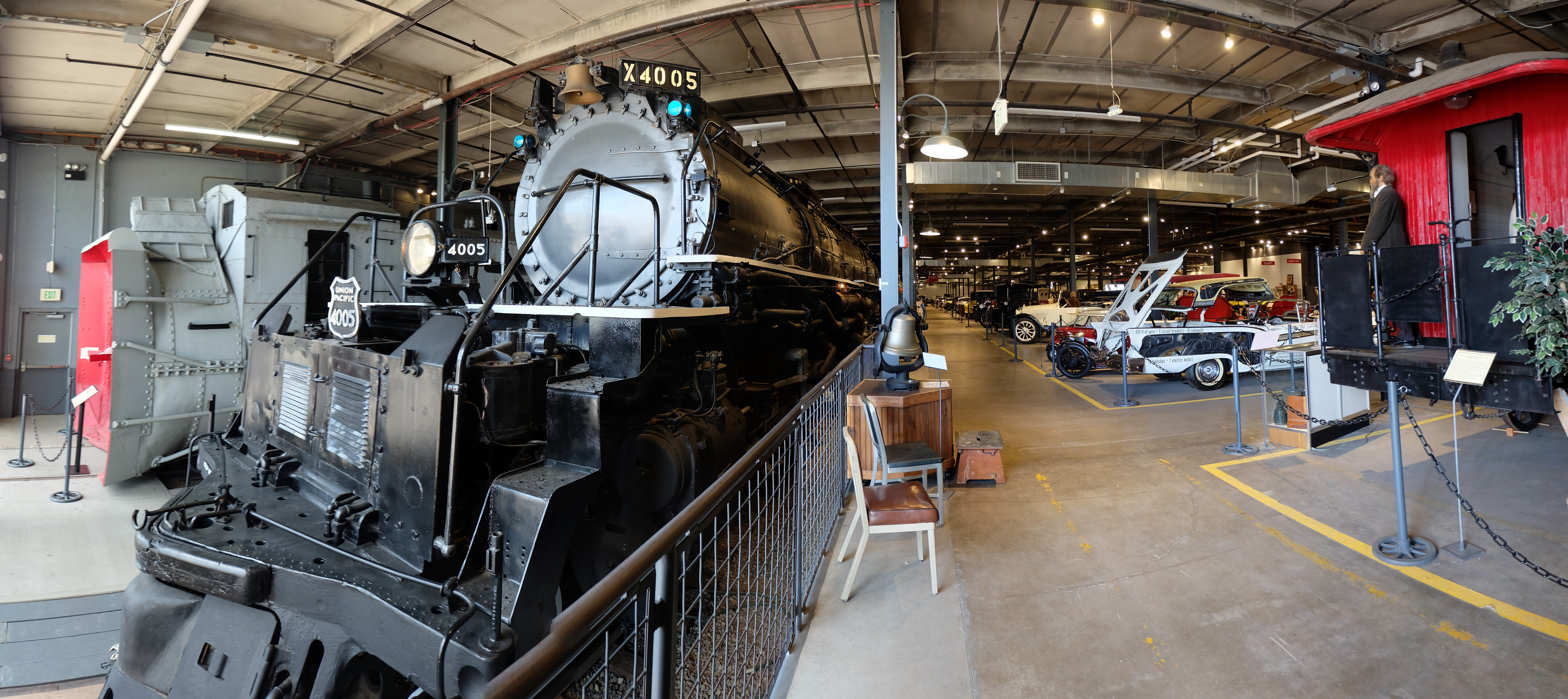
Panorama of the museum interior

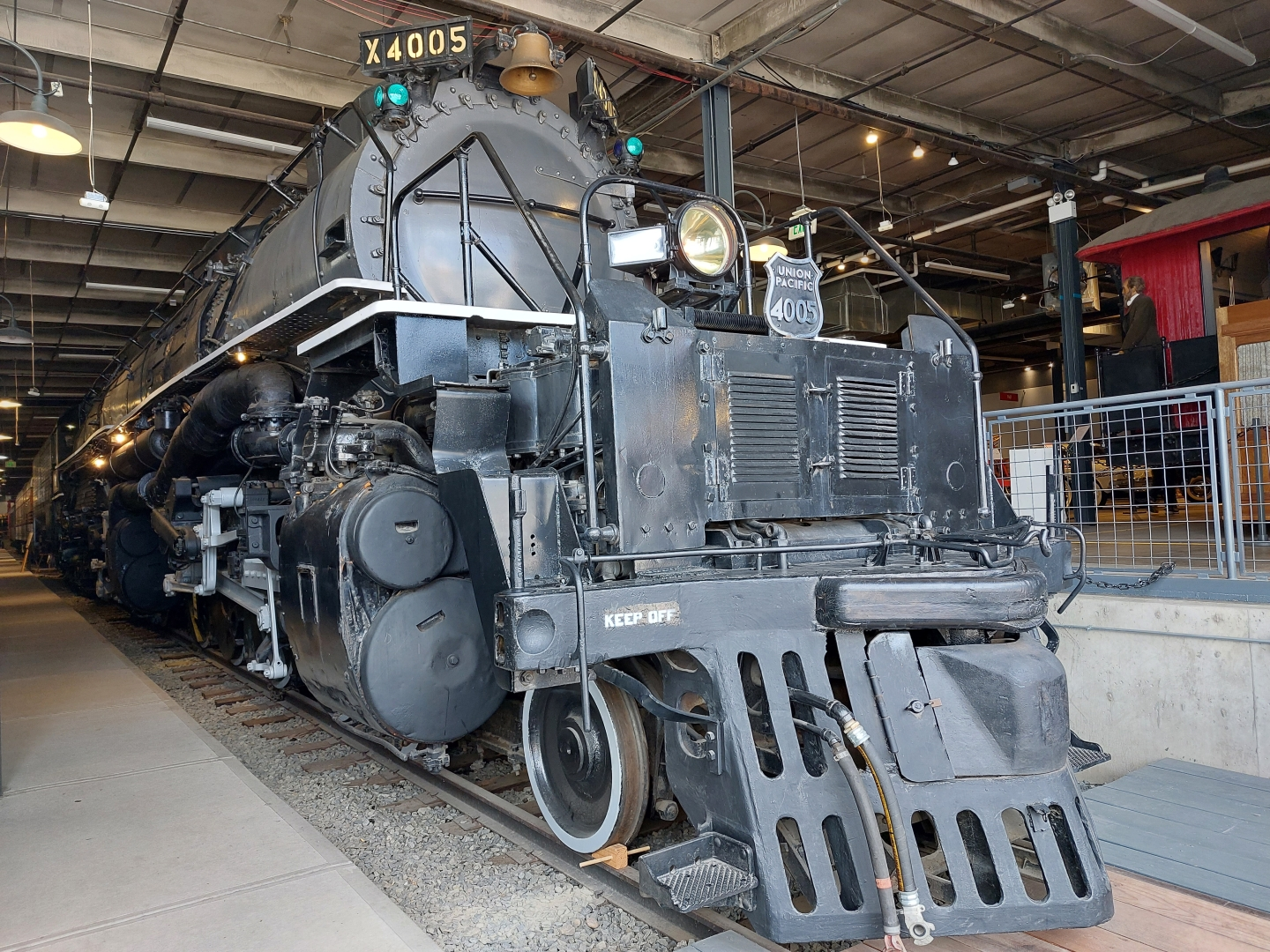
Union Pacific Big Boy No. 4005 inside the museum

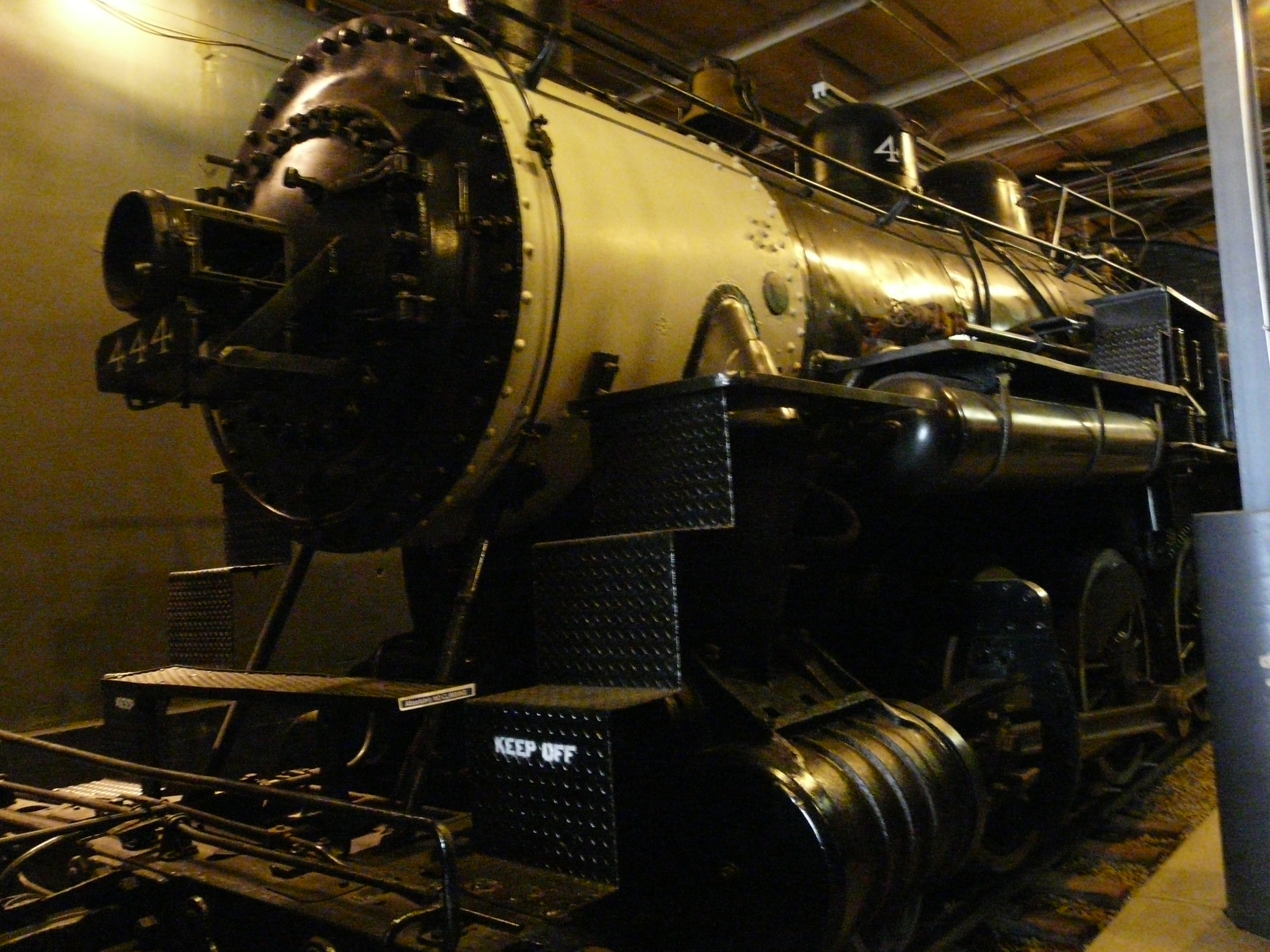
Chicago and North Western R-1 No. 444 inside the museum

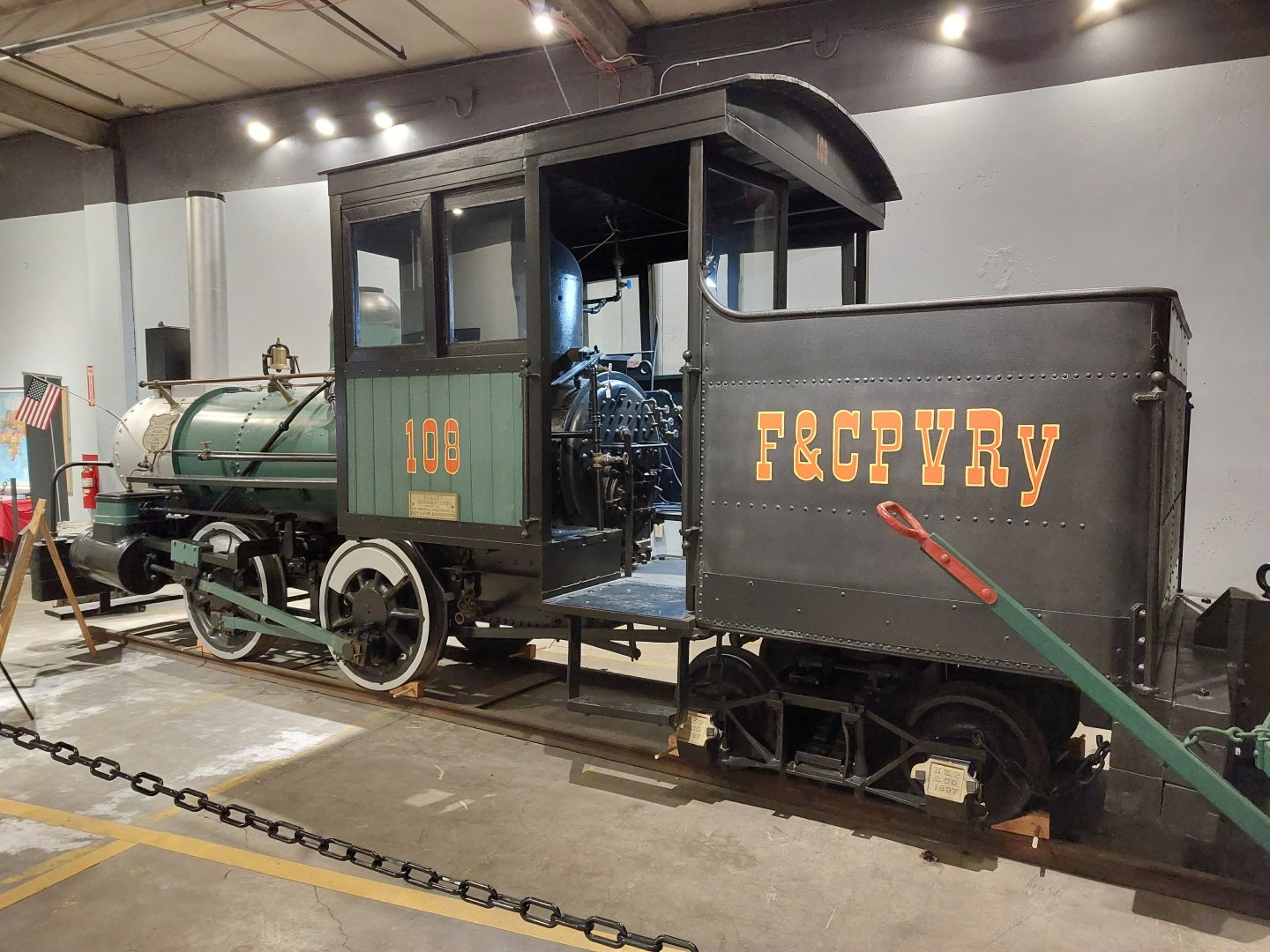
Forney locomotive No. 108 on display inside the museum
