= Union Pacific Big Boy =

Type of American steam locomotive

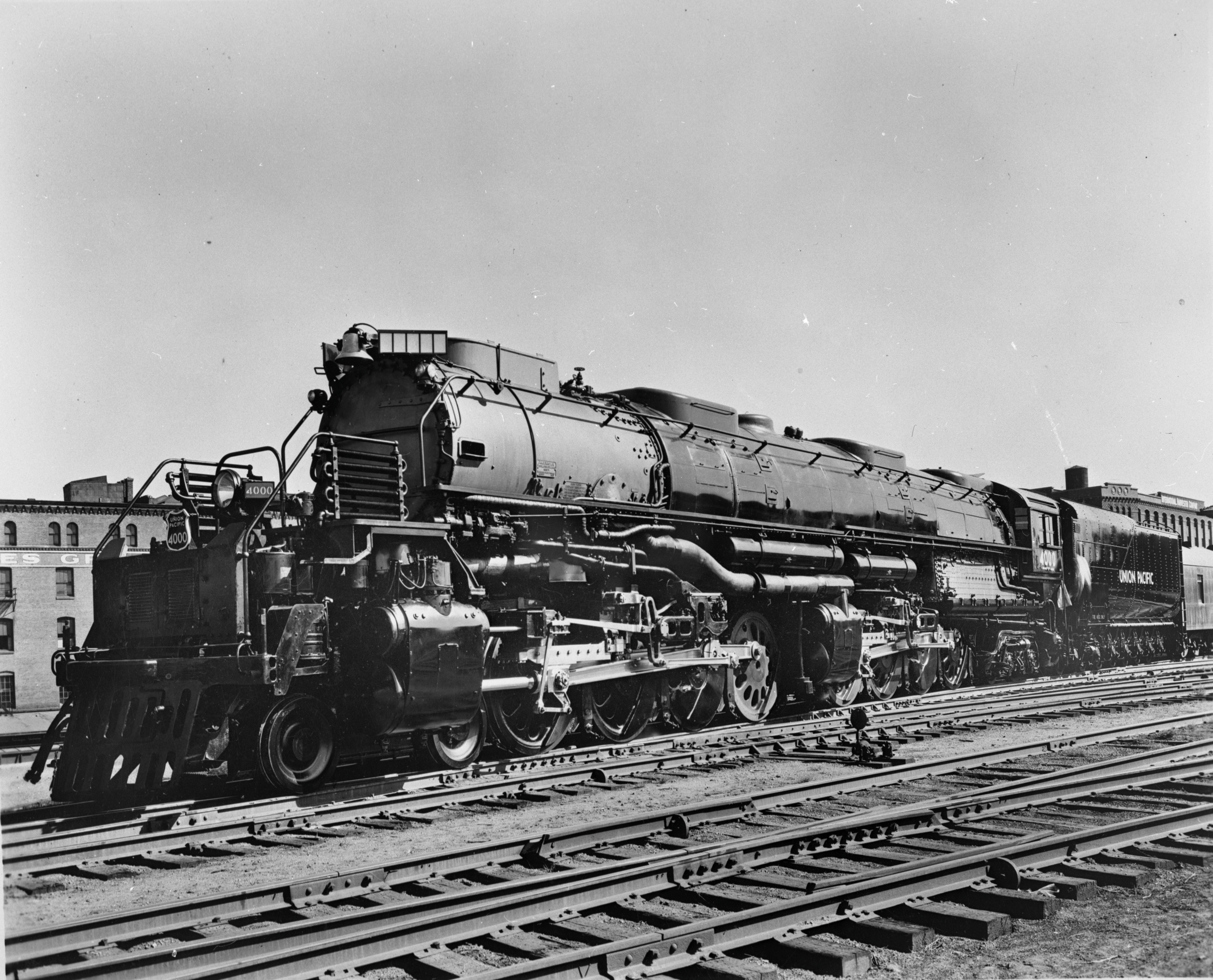
- Publicity photo of Union Pacific Big Boy No. 4000, the first of the class, taken in 1941
Type and origin
- Cost to build US$ 265,000 in 1941, equivalent to $5,800,622 in 2025
- Power type: Steam
- Designer: Otto Jabelmann
- Builder: American Locomotive Company (ALCO)
- Build date: 1941 and 1944
- Total produced: 25
Specifications
- Configuration
  - Whyte: 4-8-8-4
  - UIC: (2′D)D2′h4
- Gauge: 4 ft 8 1/2 in (1,435 mm) standard gauge
- Leading dia.: 36 in (914 mm)
- Driver dia.: 68 in (1,727 mm)
- Trailing dia.: 42 in (1,067 mm)
- Minimum curve: 288 ft (88 m) radius/ 20°
- Wheelbase: Locomotive: 72 ft 5 1/2 in (22.09 m); Overall: 117 ft 7 in (35.84 m)
- Length: Locomotive: 85 ft 3 2/5 in (25.99 m); Overall: 132 ft 9 1/4 in (40.47 m)
- Width: 11 ft (3.35 m)
- Height: 16 ft 2 1/2 in (4.94 m)
- Axle load: 4884-1: 67,500 lb 4884-2: 68,150 lb
- Adhesive weight: 4884-1: 540,000 lb 4884-2: 545,200 lb
- Loco weight: 4884-1: 762,000 lb 4884-2: 772,250 lb
- Tender weight: 4884-1: 427,500 lb 4884-2: 436,500 lb
- Total weight: 4884-1: 1,189,500 lb 4884-2: 1,208,750 lb
- Fuel type: Coal (No. 4014 converted to No. 5 fuel oil)
- Fuel capacity: 28 short tons (25.4 t; 25.0 long tons)
- Water cap.: 4884-1: 24,000 US gal 4884-2: 25,000 US gal
- Fuel consumption: Up to 11 short tons of coal / hr Up to 12,000 US gal of water / hr
- Firebox
  - Grate area: 150 sq ft (14 m^{2})
- Boiler: 107 in (2,718 mm) (OD)
- Boiler pressure: 300 lbf/in^{2} (2.1 MPa)
- Feedwater heater: Elesco Type T.P. 502 Exhaust Steam Injector; 14,000 US gal/hr capacity
- Heating surface
  - Firebox: 704 sq ft (65 m^{2}) (4884-1); 720 sq ft (67 m^{2}) (4884-2)
  - Tubes: 967 sq ft (90 m^{2}) (4884-1); 2,734 sq ft (254 m^{2}) (4884-2)
  - Flues: 4,218 sq ft (392 m^{2}) (4884-1); 2,301 sq ft (214 m^{2}) (4884-2)
  - Tubes and flues: 5,185 sq ft (482 m^{2}) (4884-1); 5,035 sq ft (468 m^{2}) (4884-2)
  - Total surface: 5,889 sq ft (547 m^{2}) (4884-1); 5,735 sq ft (533 m^{2}) (4884-2)
- Superheater
  - Type: Type E (4884-1); Type A (4884-2)
  - Heating area: 2,466 sq ft (229 m^{2}) (Type E); 2,043 sq ft (190 m^{2}) (Type A)
- Cylinders: 4
- Cylinder size: 23.75 in × 32 in (603 mm × 813 mm)
- Valve gear: Walschaerts
- Valve type: Piston valves
- Valve travel: 7 in (178 mm)
- Valve lap: 1 3/8 in (35 mm)
- Valve lead: 1/4 in (6 mm)
- Train heating: Steam heat
- Loco brake: Pneumatic, Schedule 8-ET
- Train brakes: Pneumatic
- Safety systems: Cab signals
Performance figures
- Maximum speed: 80 mph (130 km/h) (design)
- Power output: 6,290–7,000 hp (4,690–5,220 kW) @ 41 mph (66 km/h) (drawbar)
- Tractive effort: 135,375 lbf (602.18 kN)
- Factor of adh.: 3.99 (4884-1); 4.02 (4884-2)
Career
- Operators: Union Pacific
- Class: 4884-1, 4884-2
- Numbers: 4000-4019 (4884-1); 4020-4024 (4884-2)
- Official name: Big Boy
- Last run: July 21, 1959 (revenue service)
- Retired: 1959–1962
- Preserved: Seven on static display and one (No. 4014) operational in excursion service
- Restored: No. 4014; May 1, 2019
- Disposition: Eight preserved, remainder scrapped

The Union Pacific Big Boy is a type of simple articulated 4-8-8-4 steam locomotive manufactured by the American Locomotive Company (ALCO) in Schenectady, New York, between 1941 and 1944 and operated by the Union Pacific Railroad in revenue service until July 1959.

The 25 Big Boy locomotives were built to haul freight over the Wasatch Range between Ogden, Utah, and Green River, Wyoming. In the late 1940s, they were reassigned to Cheyenne, Wyoming, where they hauled freight over Sherman Hill to Laramie, Wyoming. They were the only locomotives to use a 4-8-8-4 wheel arrangement: four-wheel leading truck for stability entering curves, two sets of eight driving wheels and a four-wheel trailing truck to support the large firebox.

Eight Big Boys survive, with most on static display at museums across the United States. One of them, No. 4014, was re-acquired by Union Pacific, and by 2019 it was rebuilt to operating condition for the 150th anniversary of the first transcontinental railroad. It thus regained the title as the largest and most powerful operational steam locomotive in the world.

== History ==
=== Design ===
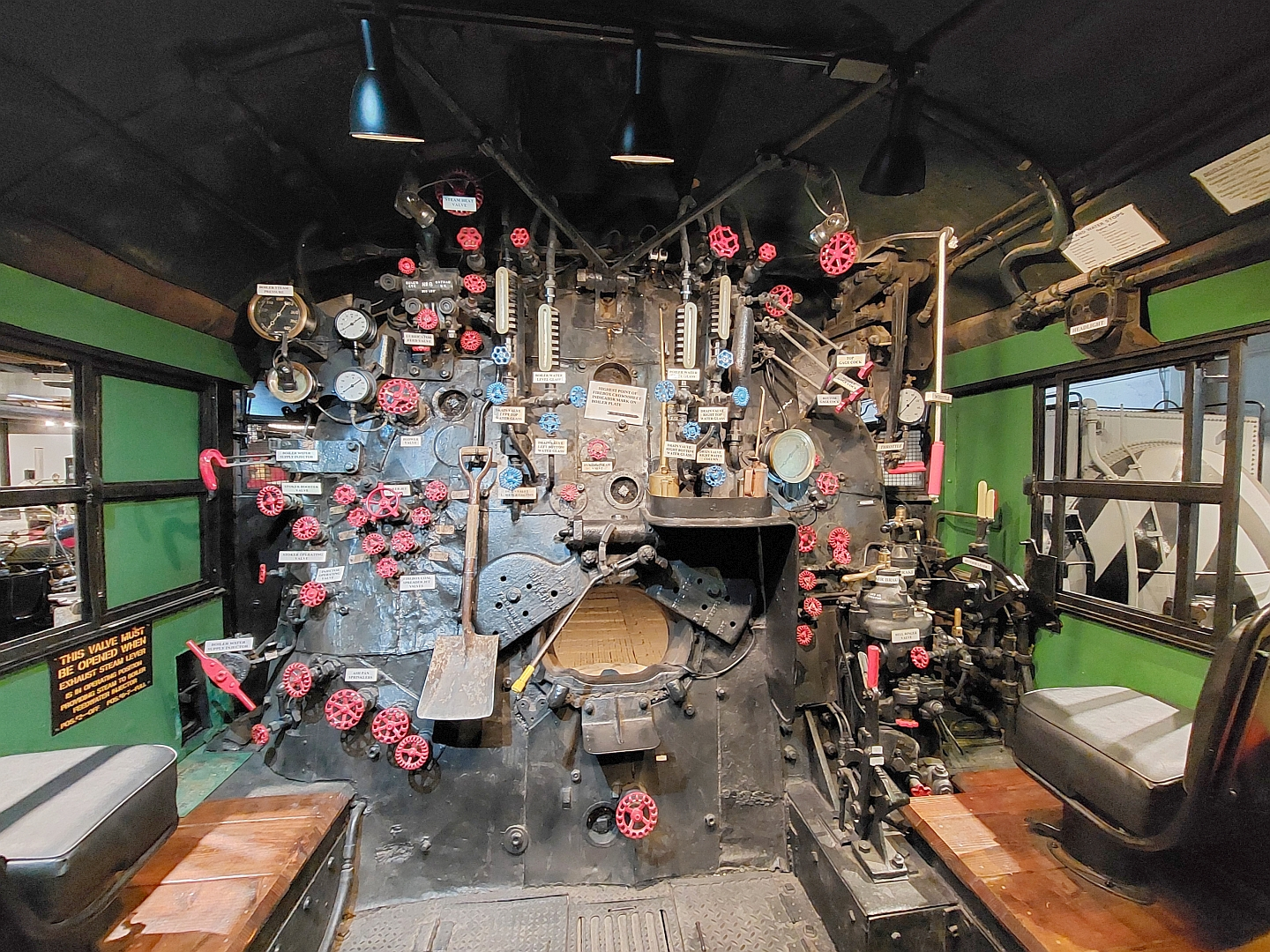
The cab controls of No. 4005, at the Forney Transportation Museum in Denver, Colorado

In 1936, Union Pacific introduced the Challenger-type (4-6-6-4) locomotives on its main line over the Wasatch Range between Green River and Ogden. For most of the route, the maximum grade is 0.82% in either direction, but the climb eastward from Ogden, into the Wasatch Range, reached 1.14%. Hauling a 3,600-short-ton (3,300 t; 3,200-long-ton) freight train demanded double heading and helper operations, which slowed service. Union Pacific therefore decided to design a new locomotive that could handle the run by itself: faster and more powerful than the compound 2-8-8-0s that UP tried after World War I, able to pull long trains at a sustained speed of 60 miles per hour (100 km/h) once past mountain grades.

A Union Pacific design team led by Otto Jabelmann, the head of the Research and Mechanical Standards section of the Union Pacific's Mechanical Department, worked with ALCO (the American Locomotive Company) to re-examine their Challenger locomotives. The team found that the railroad's goals could be achieved by enlarging the Challenger firebox to about 235 by 96 inches (5.97 m × 2.44 m) (about 150 sq ft or 14 m^{2}), increasing boiler pressure to 300 psi (2.1 MPa), adding four driving wheels, and reducing the size of the driving wheels from 69 to 68 in (1,753 to 1,727 mm). The new locomotive was carefully designed not to exceed an axle loading of 67,800 lb (30,800 kg), and it achieved the maximum possible starting tractive effort with a factor of adhesion of 4.0. It was designed to travel smoothly and safely at 80 miles per hour (130 km/h).

To achieve these new engineering goals, the Challenger locomotive was "comprehensively redesigned from first principles", wrote locomotive historian Tom Morrison. The overall design simplified some aspects of previous locomotive designs and added complexity elsewhere. Compounding, booster, and feed water heaters were eliminated, as were Baker valve gear and limited cut-off. But the "proliferation of valves and gauges on the backhead showed that running a Big Boy was an altogether more complicated and demanding task for the crew than running previous existing locomotives", Morrison wrote.

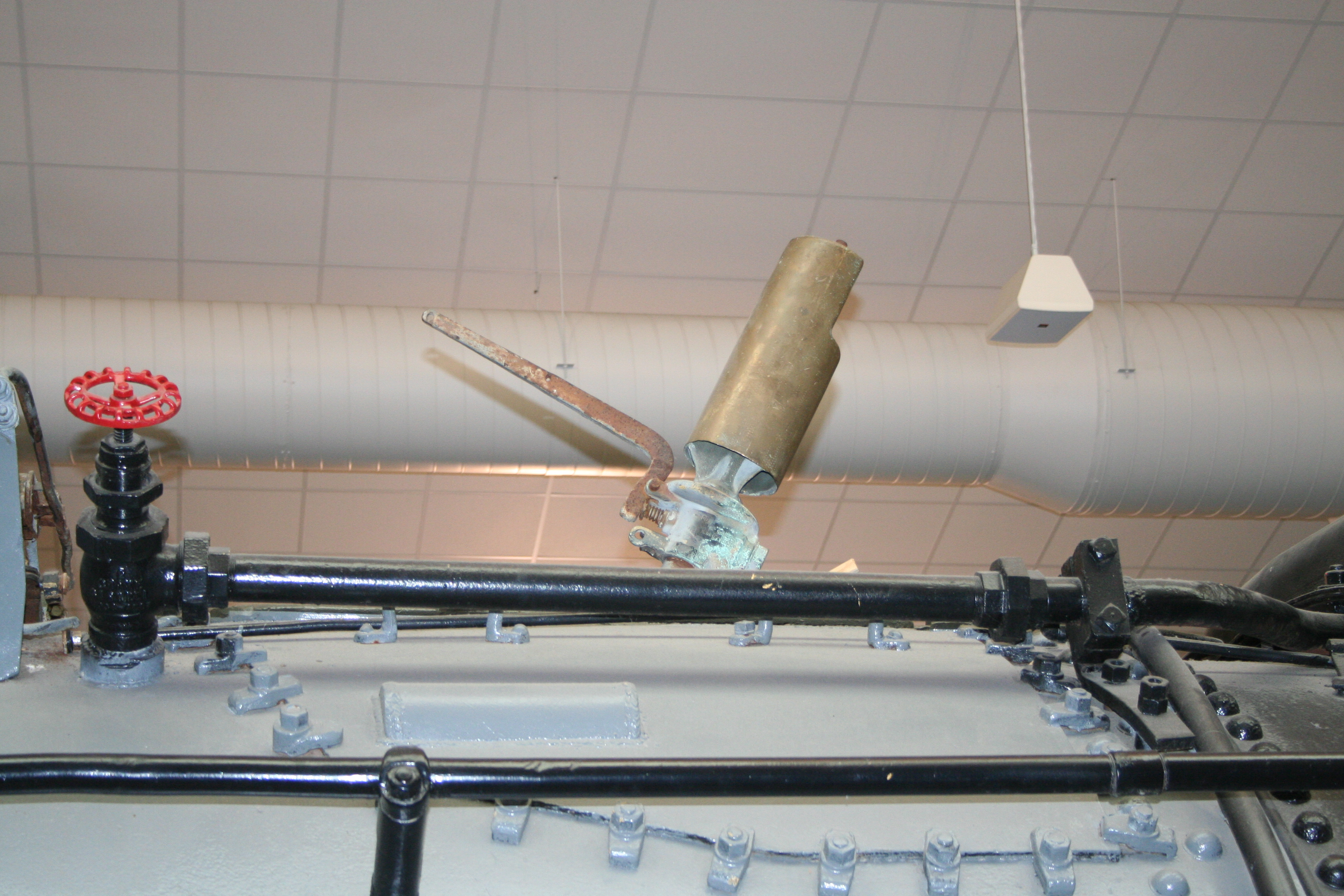
A close-up of a Hancock long-bell three-chime "steamboat" whistle used on No. 4017

The 4-8-8-4 class series, originally rumored to be called the "Wasatch", after the Wasatch Mountains, acquired its nickname after an unknown ALCO worker scrawled "Big Boy" in chalk on the front of No. 4000's smokebox door, then under construction as the first of its class.

The Big Boys were articulated, like the Mallet locomotive design, although lacking the compounding of the Mallet. They were built with a wide margin of reliability and safety, and they normally operated well below 60 miles per hour (100 km/h) in freight service. Peak drawbar horsepower was reached at about 41 mph (66 km/h). The maximum drawbar pull measured during 1943 tests was 138,200 lbf (615 kN) while starting a train. The locomotives were also equipped with a Hancock long-bell three-chime "steamboat" whistle.

The Big Boy has the longest engine body of any reciprocating steam locomotive, longer than two 40-foot (12 m) buses. They were also the heaviest reciprocating steam locomotives ever built; the combined weight of the 772,250 lb (350,290 kg) engine and 436,500 lb (198,000 kg) tender outweighed a Boeing 747. There was some speculation that the first series of Chesapeake and Ohio 2-6-6-6 H-8 “Allegheny” locomotives, built by the Lima Locomotive Works in 1941, may have weighed as much as 778,200 lb (353,000 kg), exceeding the Big Boys, but subsequent re-weighs of early-production H-8s, under close scrutiny by the builder and the railroad, found them to be about half a ton less than 772,250 lb (350,290 kg).

A few experiments were carried out on the Big Boys during their years in revenue service. One experiment saw the conversion of No. 4005 to oil fuel in 1946. Unlike a similar effort with the Challengers, the conversion failed due to uneven heating in the Big Boy's large, single-burner firebox. The locomotive was converted back to coal in 1948. (Decades later, No. 4014 would be successfully converted to oil during its restoration.) Another experiment saw No. 4007 being modified with a single stack in October 1948. The results were unsatisfactory, and the locomotive was reverted to double stack after testing. One final short-term experiment was the fitting of smoke deflectors on locomotive 4019, similar to those found on the railroad's FEF series, as well as some of their Challengers. These were later removed, as the Big Boys' nozzle and blower in the smoke box could blow smoke high enough to keep engineers’ lines of sight clear.

=== Construction and preparation ===
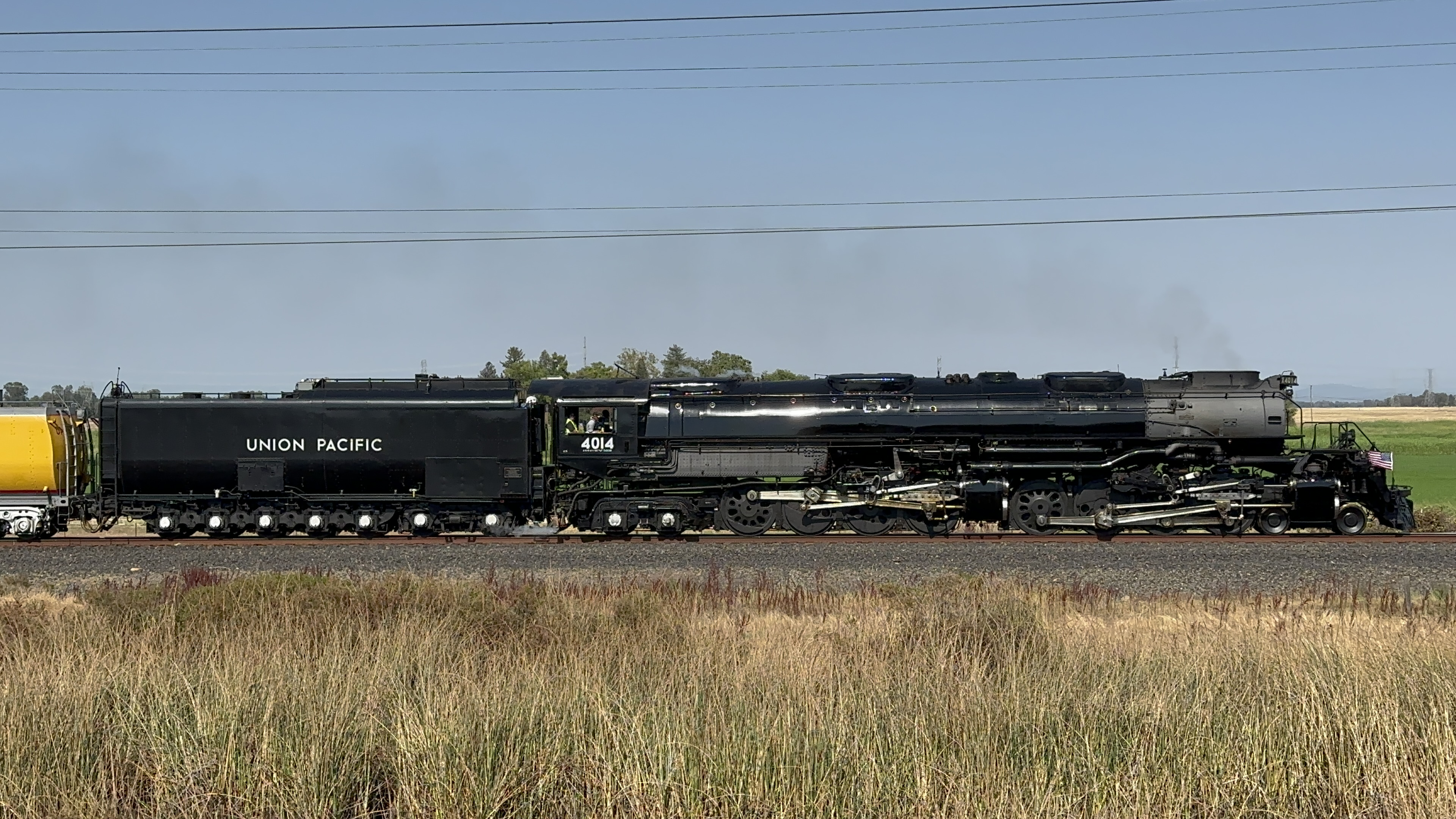
No. 4014 travels the Sacramento Subdivision towards Roseville, California, in July 2024.

The American Locomotive Company manufactured 25 Big Boy locomotives for Union Pacific: 20 were completed in 1941, and five more in 1944. Along with the Challengers, the first Big Boys arrived on the scene just as rail traffic was surging in preparation for likely American participation in World War II. They played a major role in transporting armaments and war materiel during the war. Each Big Boys were delivered from ALCO via the Delaware and Hudson (D&H), New York Central (NYC), and Chicago and North Western (C&NW) to Council Bluffs, Iowa, where a UP steam switcher transported them to the railroad's Omaha Shops in Omaha, Nebraska, where they were tested and approved for service.

While the first 20 Big Boys were being built, UP modified their infrastructure to accommodate them. They rebuilt bridges to handle the weight, realigned the track curves to add clearance, and laid new 130-pound rails between Ogden, Utah, and the Wasatch summit. UP also installed new 135-foot turntables at the servicing points in Ogden and Green River and Laramie, Wyoming, for the new 133-foot locomotives. The roundhouse at Cheyenne, Wyoming, was more constrained on space and received a 126-foot turntable, upon which the Big Boys barely fit.

Orders and numbers
Class	Quantity	Serial Nos.	Year built	UP No.	Notes
4884–1	20	69571–69590	1941	4000–4019	No. 4005 was converted to oil fuel in 1946 and back to coal in 1948. No. 4007 was modified to have a single stack, but reverted to a double stack after unsatisfactory tests in October 1948. No. 4019 carried experimental smoke deflectors from 1944 to 1945. No. 4014 has been in excursion service since May 2019.
4884–2	5	72777–72781	1944	4020–4024	

=== Operation ===
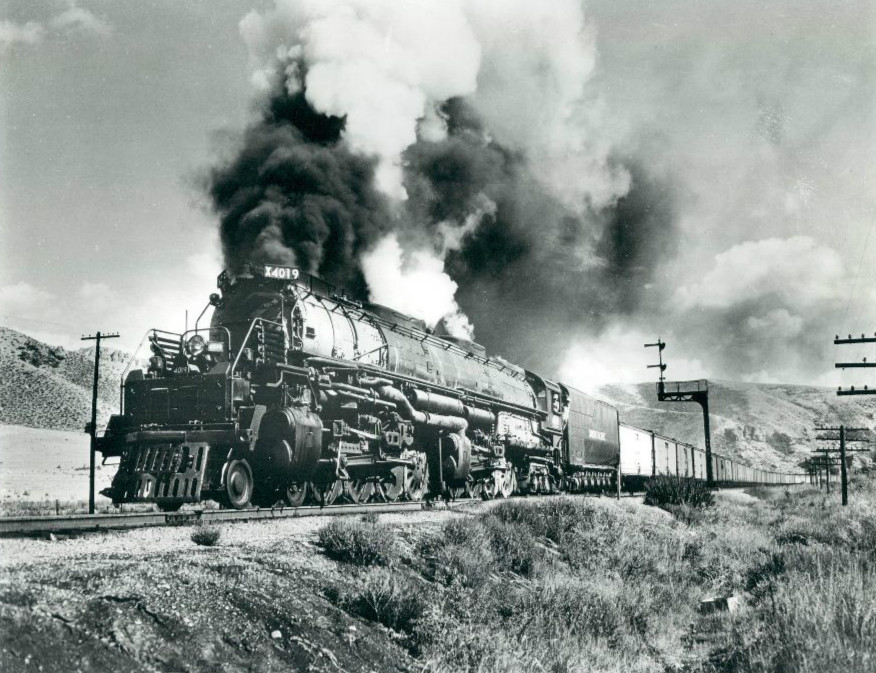
No. 4019 hauls a train through Echo Canyon, Utah.

The Big Boy locomotives had large grates to burn the low-quality bituminous coal supplied by Union Pacific-owned mines in Wyoming. Coal was carried from the tender to the firebox by a Standard Stoker Company type MB automatic stoker that could supply slightly over 12 1/2 short tons (25,000 lb) per hour. Water to the boiler was furnished by a Nathan type 4000C Automatic Restarting injector rated for 12,500 US gal (47,000 L) per hour on the right side and an Elesco T.P. 502 exhaust steam injector rated for 14,050 US gal (53,200 L) per hour on the left side.

Upon their arrival on Union Pacific property in 1941, the Big Boys were assigned to the Utah Division's First Sub, between Ogden and Green River, which included the 1.14% grade for which they were designed. From February 1943 to November of the same year, three Big Boys were assigned to the Los Angeles & Salt Lake Line and ran between Ogden and Milford, Utah. In 1944, with the arrival of additional Challengers and the second order of Big Boys, their operating territory was expanded east from Green River to Cheyenne over the Wyoming Division's Fifth, Sixth, and Seventh Subs. Beginning in 1948, Challenger locomotives took over most service between Ogden and Green River; the Big Boys saw only occasional service on the Utah Division, while their operating territory was expanded to include the line south from Cheyenne to Denver. Between 1950 and 1957, they were occasionally assigned to handle trains east of Cheyenne to North Platte over the Nebraska Division's Third Sub. In the final years of steam on the UP, where the locomotives were fired up only to help with the fall rush traffic, the Big Boys saw service only between Cheyenne and Laramie.

In April 1943, UP borrowed a dynamometer car from AT&SF to evaluate Big Boy performance. Several test runs were made on the Evanston Subdivision from Ogden to Evanston (76 mi; 122 km), and it was found that a Big Boy could consume 11 tons of coal and 12,000 US gal (45,000 L) of water an hour operating at full throttle, producing 6,290 drawbar horsepower at 41.4 mph (66.6 km/h). Designed to haul 3,600 tons up the 1.14% ruling gradient over this subdivision, the tests demonstrated that a Big Boy could handle 4,200 tons, running at an average speed of 18 to 20 mph (29 to 32 km/h) between those two division points.

The locomotives were held in high regard by crews, who found them sure-footed and more “user friendly” than other motive power. They were capable machines, and their rated hauling tonnage was increased several times over the years (see section on tonnage ratings).

Postwar increases in the price of coal and labor, along with the advent of efficient, cost-effective diesel-electric power, spelled the end of their operational lives. They were among the last steam locomotives withdrawn from service on the Union Pacific. The last revenue train hauled by a Big Boy ended its run early in the morning on July 21, 1959. Most were stored in operational condition until 1961; four remained in operational condition at Green River, Wyoming, until 1962. Their duties were assumed by diesel locomotives and gas turbine-electric locomotives.

In 2019, Union Pacific completed the restoration of No. 4014 and placed it in excursion service. The locomotive was sent on a tour in celebration of the 150th anniversary of the completion of the First transcontinental railroad.

==== Tonnage ratings over principal operating territories (1946-1959) ====
Most grades on Union Pacific's Overland Route were no steeper than 0.82%. So for most of the route, Big Boys could handle trains of roughly 6,000 tons in either direction, limited only by the length of sidings and the locomotives' capacity to recharge the train's air brake system. The two exceptions were the 1.14% eastbound gradient between Ogden and Evanston and the 1.55% westbound gradient between Cheyenne and Sherman Hill. In 1953, the latter grade was alleviated by the opening of Track 3 via Harriman, whose 0.82% grade theoretically allowed a Big Boy to haul a 6,000-ton train unassisted the entire 993 mi (1,598 km) from Council Bluffs, Iowa, to Ogden.

Eastbound tonnage ratings
	Ogden to Wasatch	Wasatch to Green River	Green River to Rock Springs	Rock Springs to Wamsutter	Wamsutter to Rawlins	Rawlins to Laramie	Laramie to Buford	Buford to Cheyenne	Cheyenne to Grand Island	Grand Island to Council Bluffs
1946	3,800 tons	5,100 tons		6,700 tons	5,100 tons			4,800 tons	N/A	
1947	4,450 tons	6,090 tons	6,090 tons	8,000 tons	6,090 tons			6,100 tons	N/A	
1949	4,450 tons	6,090 tons	6,000 tons	7,800 tons	5,900 tons		5,800 tons	6,100 tons	9,000 tons	6,800 tons

Westbound tonnage ratings
	Council Bluffs to Grand Island	Grand Island to North Platte	North Platte to Sidney	Sidney to Cheyenne	Cheyenne to Buford	Cheyenne to Hermosa via Harriman trk. 3	Buford to Laramie	Laramie to Rawlins	Rawlins to Green River	Green River to Wasatch	Wasatch to Ogden
1946	N/A				2,800 tons	N/A	5,100 tons				4,900 tons
1947	N/A				3,250 tons	N/A	6,090 tons			6,090 tons	6,100 tons
1949	6,800 tons	8,000 tons	6,500 tons	6,000 tons	3,250 tons	N/A	6,000 tons			6,090 tons	6,100 tons
1953	6,800 tons	8,000 tons	6,500 tons	6,000 tons	3,250 tons	6,000 tons	6,000 tons			6,090 tons	6,100 tons

Tonnage ratings over Greeley Subdivision (Denver - Cheyenne)
Speer Junction to Denver (Southbound)	Denver to La Salle (Northbound)	La Salle to Speer Junction (Northbound)
8,000 tons	5,000 tons	4,000 tons

===== Notes =====
- All tonnage ratings are in exclusion of the engine and tender.
- Tonnage rating from Cheyenne to Buford may be increased by 66.6% with the addition of a helper locomotive.
- Tonnage ratings may be reduced by 10% for fast freight.
- Big Boys saw limited use on the line between Cheyenne and North Platte (in part because they were too long for the turntable in N Platte).

== No. 4005 accident ==
On April 27, 1953, No. 4005 was pulling a freight train through southern Wyoming when it jumped a switch track at 50 mph (80 km/h), throwing the engine onto its left side and derailing its tender and the first 18 freight cars of its 62-car train. Engineer Leo Murry and fireman Lawrence Edward Endres were killed on impact; brakeman James Anderton died of severe burns in a hospital a few days later. The tender destroyed the cab of the locomotive, and the loads from the 18 derailed cars were scattered. The locomotive was repaired by Union Pacific at its Cheyenne facility and returned to service; it served until 1962.

== Preservation ==
Most of the 25 Big Boys were scrapped, but seven remain on static display: two indoors and five outdoors, under the elements. An eighth locomotive, Union Pacific 4014, was rebuilt to operating condition by Union Pacific's steam program.

Surviving Big Boy locomotives
Type	Road Number	Image	Date built	Serial number	Location	Coordinates	Notes
4884-1	4004		September 1941	69575	Holliday Park, Cheyenne, Wyoming	41°08′12.30″N 104°47′59.4″W	Received cosmetic restoration in 2018. Surviving tender No. 25-C-103 from No. 4002.
4884-1	4005		September 1941	69576	Forney Transportation Museum, Denver, Colorado	39°46′37.38″N 104°58′13.8″W	Wrecked on April 27, 1953, and repaired afterwards. Donated to the museum in June 1970. Surviving tender No. 25-C-403 from No. 4022.
4884-1	4006		September 1941	69577	National Museum of Transportation, St. Louis, Missouri	38°34′19.73″N 090°27′40.0″W	Received cosmetic restoration, completed in 2024. Traveled 1,064,625 mi (1,713,348 km) in freight operation, farther than any other Big Boy. Surviving tender No. 25-C-104 from No. 4003.
4884-1	4012		November 1941	69583	Steamtown National Historic Site, Scranton, Pennsylvania	41°24′26.96″N 075°40′10.8″W	Was displayed at Steamtown, USA in Bellows Falls, Vermont, until 1984. Received cosmetic restoration, completed in 2021. Displayed outdoors because it is too large for Steamtown's turntable and roundhouse. Steamtown staff believe No. 4012 could be restored to working order, but recommended first determining whether the surrounding rail infrastructure could handle the engine's weight. Surviving tender No. 25-C-114 from No. 4013.
4884-1	4014		November 1941	69585	Union Pacific Railroad, Cheyenne, Wyoming	41°7′46.9308″N 104°48′49.1688″W	Long displayed at Fairplex RailGiants Train Museum in Pomona, California, No. 4014 was re-acquired and restored to operational condition by Union Pacific, then placed in excursion service in May 2019 at its new home in Cheyenne, Wyoming, as the largest, heaviest, and most powerful operational steam locomotive in the world. Previous surviving tender No. 25-C-116 from No. 4015. Now mated with tender No. 25-C-311 (taken from UP Challenger No. 3985). (Note: In 2019, the tender from Challenger No. 3985, No. 25-C-311, was connected to Big Boy No. 4014 to save time in meeting the restoration deadline. The Railroading Heritage of Midwest America (RRHMA), which acquired No. 3985 in 2022, plans to rebuild No. 4014's original tender, No. 25-C-116, to carry fuel oil instead of coal. Afterwards, it will be returned to the No. 4014 locomotive, while the No. 25-C-311 would be reconnected to the No. 3985 locomotive.)
4884-1	4017		December 1941	69588	National Railroad Museum, Green Bay, Wisconsin	44°29′02.70″N 088°02′55.1″W	Displayed in a climate-controlled shed. It was reportedly attempted to steam by the visiting crew of the Flying Scotsman in 1970, but was aborted after 20 tons of coal failed to do so. Surviving tender No. 25-C-404 from No. 4023.
4884-1	4018		December 1941	69589	Museum of the American Railroad, Frisco, Texas	33.144513°N 96.833444°W	Moved to its current location from the museum's former location in Dallas, Texas, by rail on August 25, 2013. Surviving tender No. 25-C-101 from No. 4000.
4884-2	4023		November 1944	72780	Kenefick Park, Omaha, Nebraska	41°13′55.7″N 095°55′4.1″W	The only surviving Big Boy from the second group built in 1944, and the only Big Boy known to have been moved by highway. Surviving tender No. 25-C-105 from No. 4004.

== See also ==
- Union Pacific Challenger
- Union Pacific FEF Series
- Union Pacific Heritage Fleet
- EAR 59 class – The world's largest metre-gauge steam locomotive, operated by East African Railways
