= 4-8-8-4 =

Articulated locomotive wheel arrangement

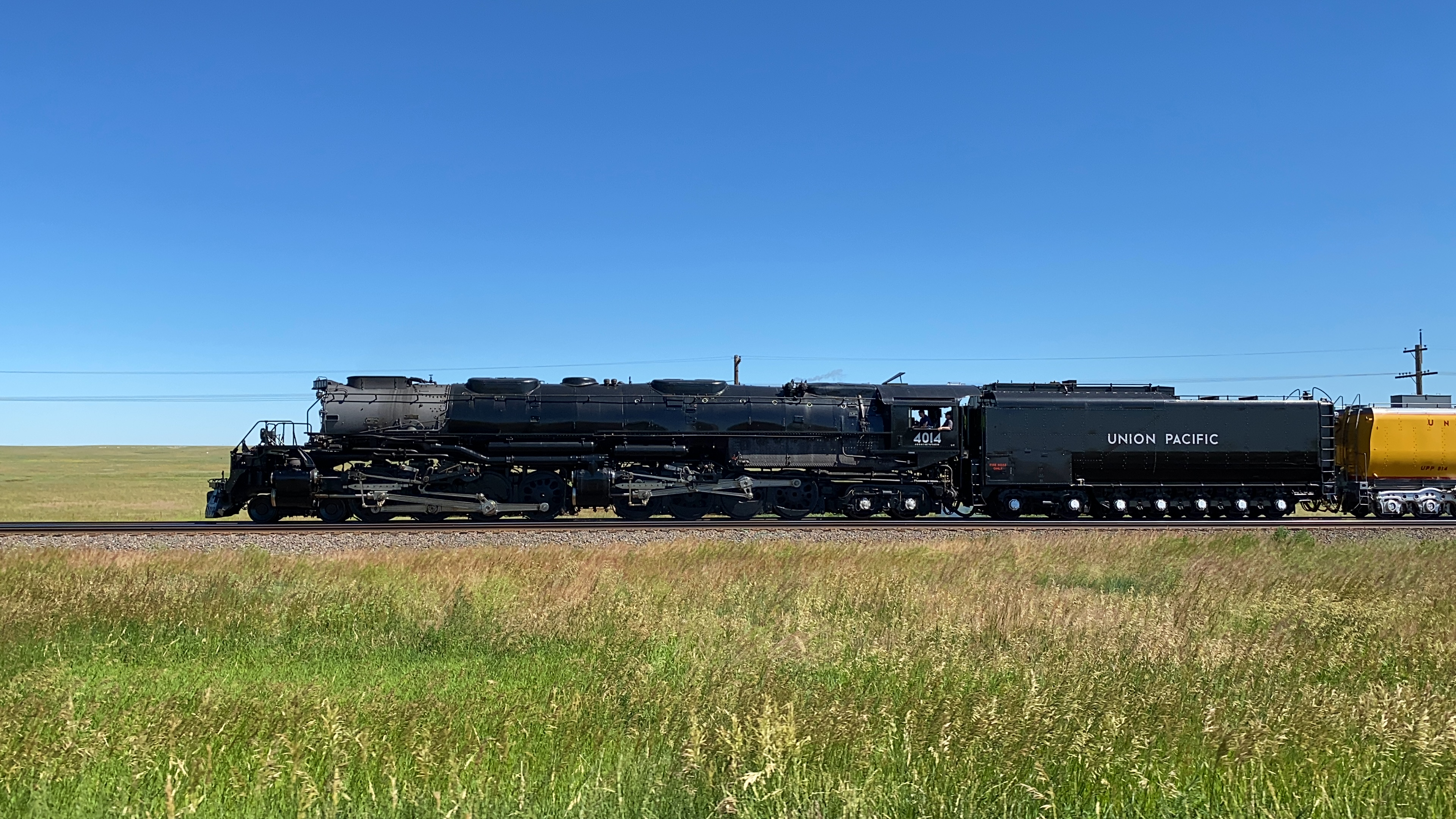
A Big Boy locomotive. This example is Union Pacific 4014.

4-8-8-4 wheel arrangement

A 4-8-8-4, in the Whyte notation for the classification of steam locomotives by wheel arrangement, is a locomotive with a four-wheel leading truck, two sets of eight driving wheels, and a four-wheel trailing truck. Only one model of locomotives has ever used this wheel configuration, and that is commonly known as "Union Pacific Big Boys" after the railroad that operated them.

Other equivalent classifications are:

- UIC classification: '2DD2' (also known as German classification and Italian classification)
- French locomotive classification: '240+042'
- Turkish locomotive classification: '46+46'
- Swiss classification: '4/6+4/6'
- Russian classification: 2-4-4-2 or 2-4-0+0-4-2

The equivalent UIC classification is refined to (2′D)D2′ for simple articulated locomotives.

A similar wheel arrangement exists for Garratt locomotives, but is referred to as 4-8-0+0-8-4 since both engine units swivel.

4-8-8-4 Big Boys were only produced for the Union Pacific Railroad. Twenty-five such engines were built between 1941 and 1944, numbered 4000 to 4024. Eight of these locomotives survive, seven of which are on static public display at various sites in the United States. Union Pacific announced plans in August 2013 to restore No. 4014 to operation for use in mainline excursion service. No. 4014 underwent restoration between 2016 and 2019, and completed its first post-restoration test run on May 2, 2019.

The UP Big Boys were an expansion of the 4-6-6-4 "Challenger" type articulated locomotive. Adding four driving wheels increased the pulling power of the locomotive and reduced the need for helper locomotives over steep grades. Although their wheels were an inch (25.4 mm) smaller than those of the Challengers, they were still able to sustain similar high speeds.

Other American railroads considered buying 4-8-8-4s, including the Western Pacific Railroad, which already rostered large 2-8-8-2s and 4-6-6-4s, but diesel locomotives were gaining popularity and soon were able to displace these Big Boy locomotives.
