= Union Pacific FEF series =

Three classes of American 4-8-4 locomotives

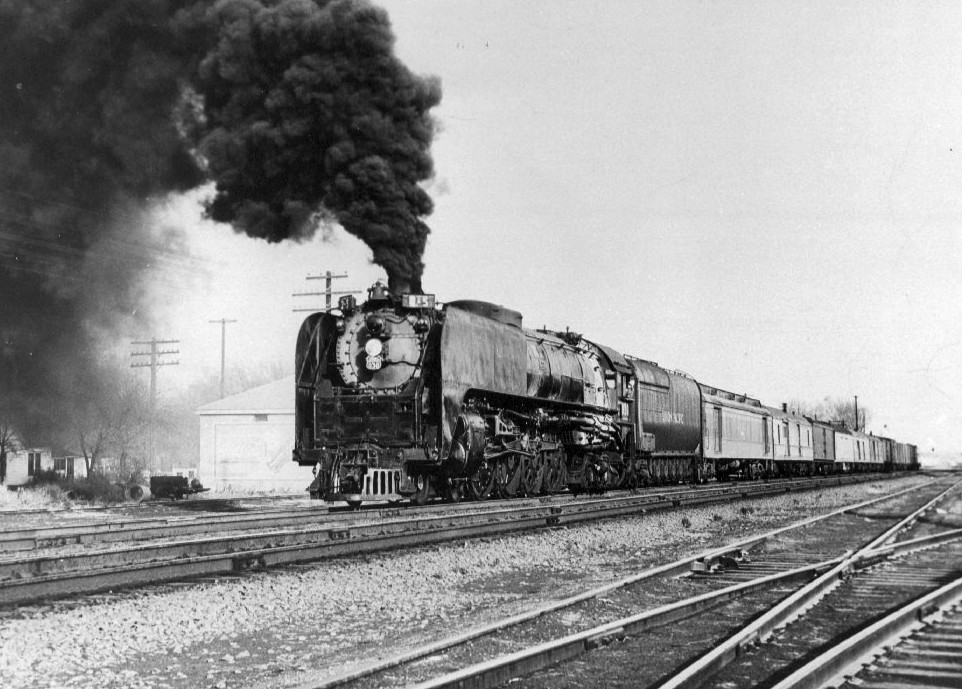
- Union Pacific FEF-2 No. 830 pulls a "Fast Mail" train in November 1954
Type and origin
- Power type: Steam
- Builder: American Locomotive Company (ALCO)
- Build date: 1937–1944
- Total produced: 45
Specifications
- Configuration
  - Whyte: 4-8-4
  - UIC: 2′D2′ h2s
- Gauge: 4 ft 8 1/2 in (1,435 mm)
- Driver dia.: FEF-1: 77 in (1,956 mm), FEF-2/3: 80 in (2,032 mm)
- Wheelbase: Loco & tender: 98 ft 5 in (30.00 m)
- Length: Loco & tender: 114 ft 2 5/8 in (34.81 m)
- Adhesive weight: FEF-1: 270,000 lb (122.5 tonnes), FEF-2: 265,520 lb (120.4 tonnes), FEF-3: 270,300 lb (122.6 tonnes)
- Loco weight: FEF-1: 465,000 lb (210.9 tonnes), FEF-2: 478,640 lb (217.1 tonnes), FEF-3: 486,340 lb (220.6 tonnes)
- Total weight: FEF-1: 830,150 lb (376.5 tonnes), FEF-2: 894,960 lb (405.9 tonnes), FEF-3: 907,890 lb (411.8 tonnes)
- Fuel type: Coal from 1937 to 1946; No. 5 fuel oil from 1946 onwards
- Fuel capacity: Coal: 50,000 lb (22.7 tonnes), Oil: 6,000 US gal (22,712.5 litres; 4,996.0 imperial gallons)
- Water cap.: 20,000 US gal (76,000 L; 17,000 imp gal)
- Firebox
  - Grate area: 100 sq ft (9.3 m^{2})
- Boiler: 86 3/16 in (2189.2 mm) diameter 100 in (2,540 mm) (OD)
- Boiler pressure: 300 lbf/in^{2} (2.07 MPa)
- Heating surface
  - Firebox: 442 sq ft (41.1 m^{2})
  - Tubes: 2,204 sq ft (204.8 m^{2})
  - Flues: 1,578 sq ft (146.6 m^{2})
  - Total surface: 4,224 sq ft (392.4 m^{2})
- Superheater
  - Type: FEF-1/3: Type A FEF-2: Type E
  - Heating area: 1,400 sq ft (130 m^{2})
- Cylinders: Two, outside
- Cylinder size: FEF-1: 24.5 in × 32 in (622 mm × 813 mm), FEF-2/3: 25 in × 32 in (635 mm × 813 mm)
- Valve gear: Walschaerts
- Loco brake: Air
- Train brakes: Air
Performance figures
- Tractive effort: FEF-1: 63,611 lbf (283.0 kN), FEF-2/3: 63,800 lbf (283.8 kN)
- Factor of adh.: FEF-1/3: 4.24; FEF-2: 4.17
Career
- Operators: Union Pacific Railroad
- Class: FEF-1, FEF-2, and FEF-3
- Numbers: FEF-1: 800–819, FEF-2: 820–834, FEF-3: 835–844
- Delivered: FEF-1: 1937, FEF-2: 1939, FEF-3: 1944
- Retired: 1958-1959 (but 844 never retired)
- Preserved: FEF-1: No. 814 preserved, remainder scrapped FEF-2: No. 833 preserved, remainder scrapped FEF-3: Nos. 844 and 838 preserved, remainder scrapped
- Disposition: FEF-1: No. 814 on display FEF-2: No. 833 on display FEF-3: No. 844 operational in excursion service, No. 838 in storage as source of spare parts

The Union Pacific FEF series consists of forty-five 4-8-4 "Northern" steam locomotives built in three classes for the Union Pacific Railroad by the American Locomotive Company (ALCO) between 1937 and 1944. The FEF acronym comes from the first letters of the wheel arrangement, Four Eight Four. They were in operation until overtaken by dieselization, with all but one retired by 1959.

The final steam locomotives built for the Union Pacific, the FEFs represented the apex of dual-service steam locomotive development in the United States, as funds and research were thereafter concentrated into the development of diesel-electric locomotives. Designed to burn coal, they were converted to run on fuel oil in 1946. FEFs pulled a variety of passenger trains, such as the Overland Limited, Los Angeles Limited, Portland Rose and Challenger, until diesel-electric locomotives took over passenger service. Many FEF series locomotives were reassigned to freight service during the last years of their careers.

Four FEF series locomotives survive, including No. 844, which remains in operational condition and runs in excursion service. It is one of the Union Pacific's oldest serving locomotives, and the only steam locomotive never permanently retired by a North American Class I railroad.

== Origins ==
In the late 1930s, rising trainloads started to exceed the traction limits of the 4-8-2s that were the mainstay of UP passenger operations. One day in 1937, with UP President William Jeffer's business car in the rear, a 7000-class 4-8-2 demonstrated the lack of steaming power inherent in the type. Even as the train was waiting for rescue, a telegram was sent to ALCO in Schenectady, New York, asking for an improved design. The result was the FEF series, a class of locomotives that could produce between 4,000 and 5,000 drawbar horsepower and reliably operate at 100 mph. They would run about 14,000 miles a month.

== Models ==
The FEF series consisted of three classes of steam locomotives: FEF-1 (20 units), FEF-2 (15 units), and FEF-3 (10 units). Like other Union Pacific steam classes, the acronym comes from the first letter of the spelling of its wheel arrangement, Four Eight Four.

Table of orders and numbers
Class	Quantity	Manufacturer	Alco Order No.	Serial Nos.	Year built	UP No.	Notes
FEF-1	20	American Locomotive Company	S-1769	68808-68827	1937	800–819	Converted to oil fuel in 1945–1946.
FEF-2	15	American Locomotive Company	S-1811	69161-69175	1939	820–834	Converted to oil fuel in 1945–1946.
FEF-3	10	American Locomotive Company	S-1937	72782-72791	1944	835–844	Converted to oil fuel in 1945–1946. No. 844 in excursion service since 1960; renumbered to 8444 from 1962 to 1989.

=== FEF-1 ===
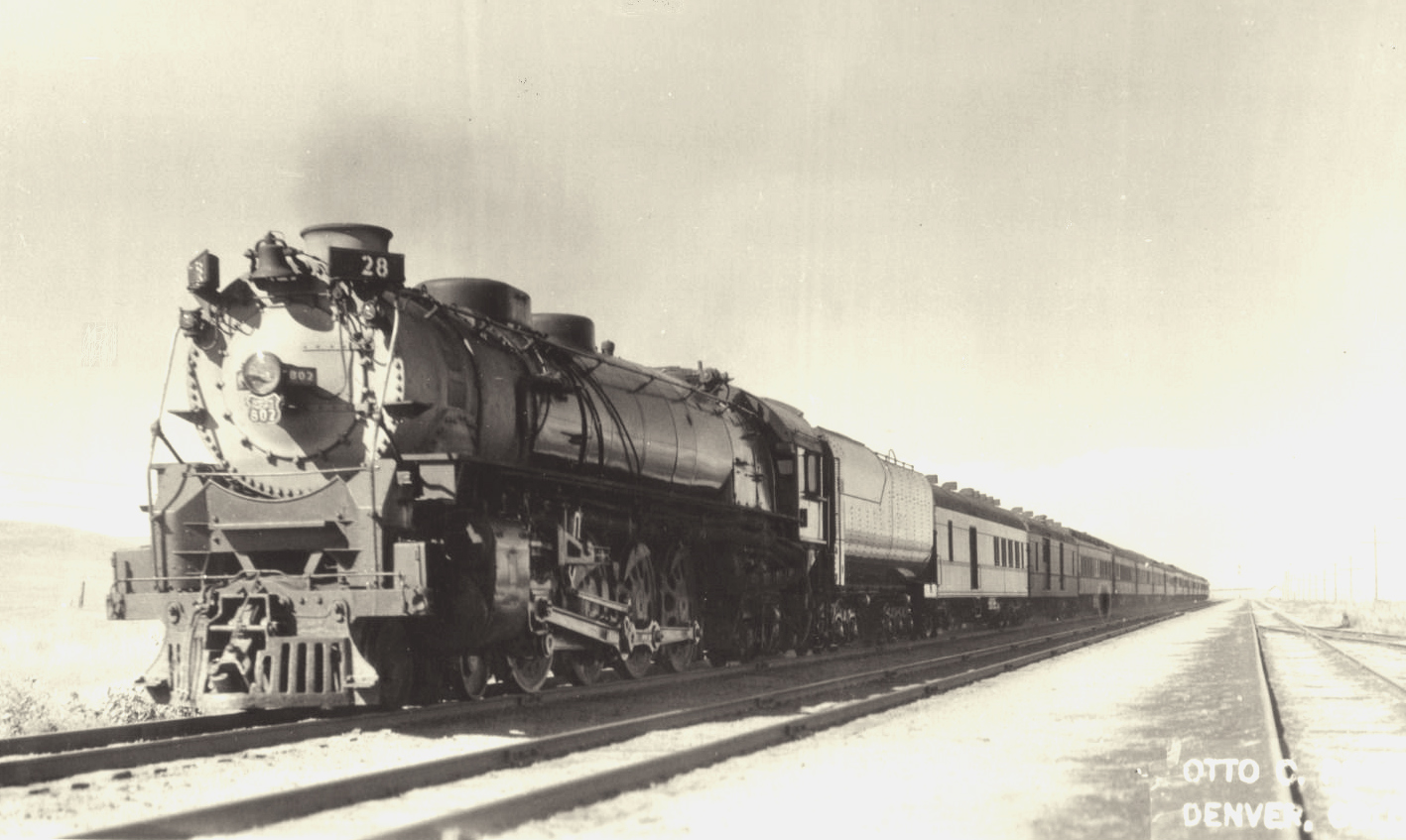
Union Pacific FEF-1 No. 802 pulling the San Francisco Overland Limited in August 1941

The first 20 locomotives, numbered 800–819, were delivered by ALCO in 1937. As a whole they followed the simplest possible arrangement of two outside cylinders, without the complicated accessories on many other locomotives, in order to achieve an uncluttered appearance.. Fitting ALCO's lateral motion devices to the leading coupled wheels eased the negotiation of curves. Despite frequently running faster than 100 mph (161 km/h), the strain on the coupling and connecting rods were kept within acceptable limits. There were many reports of the class reaching the design limit of 110 mph (177 km/h).

=== FEF-2 ===
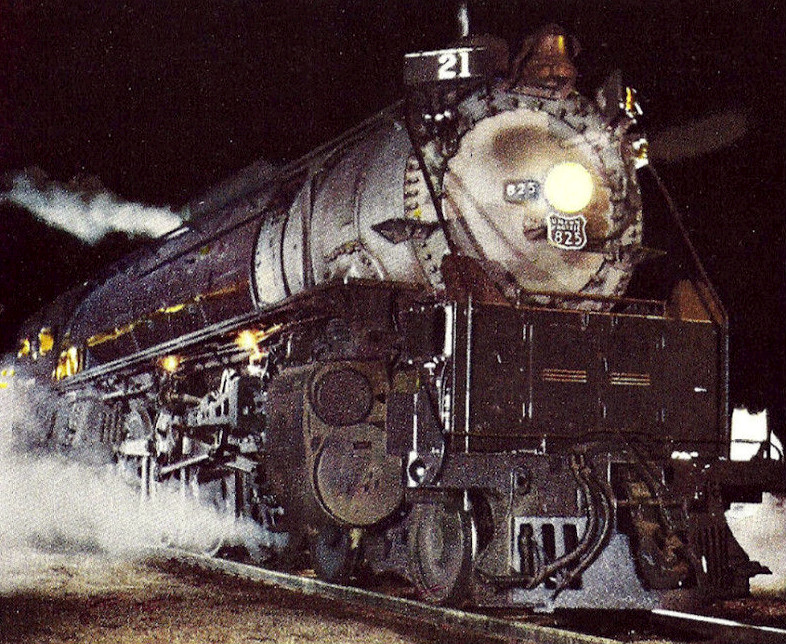
Union Pacific FEF-2 No. 825 in a 1943 World War II publicity photo

The second batch of 15 locomotives, numbered 820–834, was delivered in 1939. Their improvements included larger cylinders, better tractive effort, smoke deflectors on the sides of the smokebox, and driving wheels that were three inches wider in diameter. The biggest change was the replacement of the 12-wheeled tender with a 14-wheeled "pedestal" or "centipede" tender. UP 833 has been tied to claims to have hit the classes' max speed of 120 mph, but was not officially recorded due to the speed violating Union Pacific's corporate rules.

=== FEF-3 ===
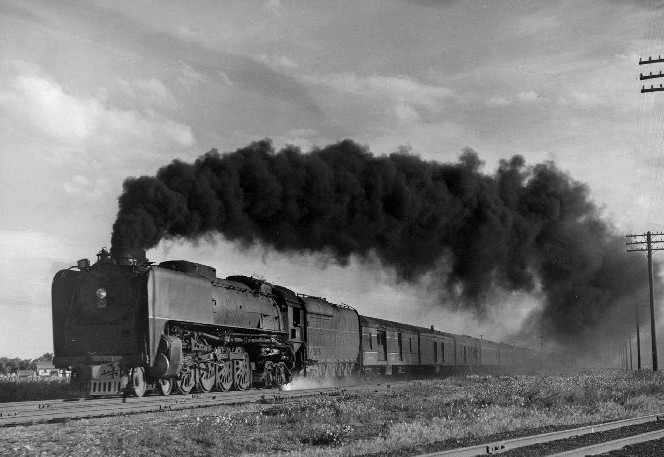
Union Pacific FEF-3 No. 844 hauling the Pony Express in 1949

Except for the use of some substitute materials, the final batch of 10 locomotives, numbered 835–844, were nearly identical to the FEF-2. After World War II, coal supplies were limited by a series of strikes. To continue operations unfettered, UP converted the 800s to burn oil, and fitted a 6,000-US-gallon (23,000 L; 5,000 imp gal) tank in the bunker space. Otherwise, few modifications were needed to ensure years of mainline service. These were the last steam locomotives delivered for the UP. Like many late era steam locomotives, their service lives were short due to rapid dieselization. A former manager of the Union Pacific Steam Program said, "Although it is stated that the UP FEF Series were designed to safely operate at 120 mph (190 km/h), no one really knows how fast the final 4-8-4 could go. The last FEF-3 was actually never retired."

== Surviving examples ==
Four FEF series locomotives survive. No. 814 (FEF-1) and No. 833 (FEF-2) are on static display. No. 844 (FEF-3) has remained operational and is used in excursion service. No. 838 (FEF-3) is used solely as a source of spare parts for No. 844.

Surviving FEF locomotives
Type	Number	Image	Date built	Serial number	Location	Coordinates	Notes
FEF-1	814		September 1937	68822	RailsWest Railroad Museum, Council Bluffs, Iowa	41°14′52″N 95°51′10″W	
FEF-2	833		October 1939	69174	Utah State Railroad Museum, Ogden, Utah	41°13′15″N 111°58′47″W	Originally on display at Pioneer Park in Salt Lake City, Utah.
FEF-3	838		December 1944	72785	Union Pacific Railroad, Cheyenne, Wyoming	41°7′46.9308″N 104°48′49.1688″W	Source of spare parts for 844.
FEF-3	844		December 1944	72791	Union Pacific Railroad, Cheyenne, Wyoming	41°7′46.9308″N 104°48′49.1688″W	The only steam locomotive never retired by a North American Class I railroad.

== See also ==
- Union Pacific Challenger
- Union Pacific Big Boy
