= 8444 =

8444 may refer to:

- The year in the 9th millennium
- 8444 Popovich, a Mars-crossing Asteroid
- Union Pacific 844, a Union Pacific steam locomotive which was numbered 8444 between 1962 and 1989
