= Pittsburgh and Lake Erie class A-2a =

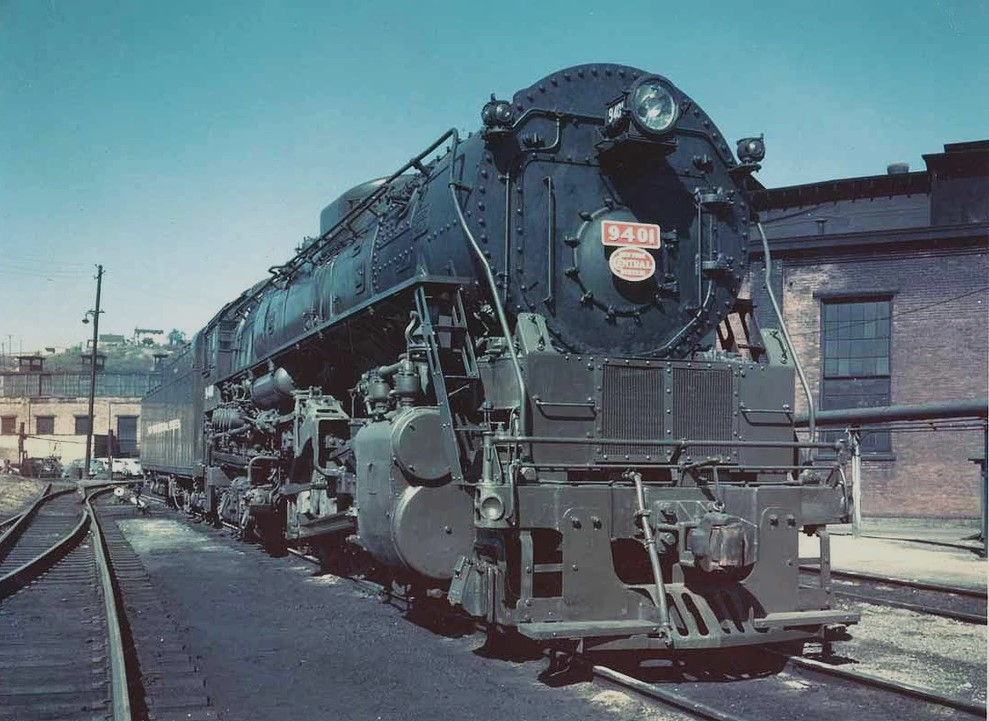
- NYC No. 9401
Type and origin
- Power type: Steam
- Builder: American Locomotive Company (ALCO)
- Build date: May-June 1948
- Total produced: 7
Specifications
- Configuration
  - Whyte: 2-8-4
- Gauge: 4 ft 8 1/2 in (1,435 mm) standard gauge
- Driver dia.: 63 in (1,600 mm)
- Adhesive weight: 280,000 lb (127.0 tonnes)
- Loco weight: 426,000 lb (193.2 tonnes)
- Tender weight: 352,780 lb (160.0 tonnes)
- Fuel type: Coal
- Fuel capacity: 22 tonnes (49,000 lb)
- Water cap.: 20,000 US gallons (76,000 L; 17,000 imp gal)
- Boiler pressure: 230 psi (1.59 MPa)
Career
- Operators: Pittsburgh and Lake Erie Railroad (P&LE); New York Central Railroad (NYC)
- Class: P&LE A-2a
- Numbers: 9400-9406
- Retired: August 1956
- Scrapped: 1957

The Pittsburgh and Lake Erie class A-2a was a class of seven 2-8-4 "Berkshire" type steam locomotives built by American Locomotive Company (ALCO) in Schenectady, New York for the Pittsburgh and Lake Erie Railroad (P&LE) in 1948. They were also the last steam locomotives to be built by ALCO.

== History ==
In 1948, the Pittsburgh and Lake Erie Railroad (P&LE) purchased seven 2-8-4 "Berkshire" type steam locomotives from the American Locomotive Company (ALCO) of Schenectady New York and designated as the class A-2a and assigned road numbers 9400 through 9406. The tenders were built by Lima and carried 22 t (21.7 long tons; 24.3 short tons) of coal.

Delivered between May and June 1948, the class had a short life and were the last steam locomotives ever produced by ALCO. Nos. 9400 through 9406 were retired in August 1956 and all of them were scrapped in 1957.
