= Union Pacific 844 =

Preserved Union Pacific steam locomotive

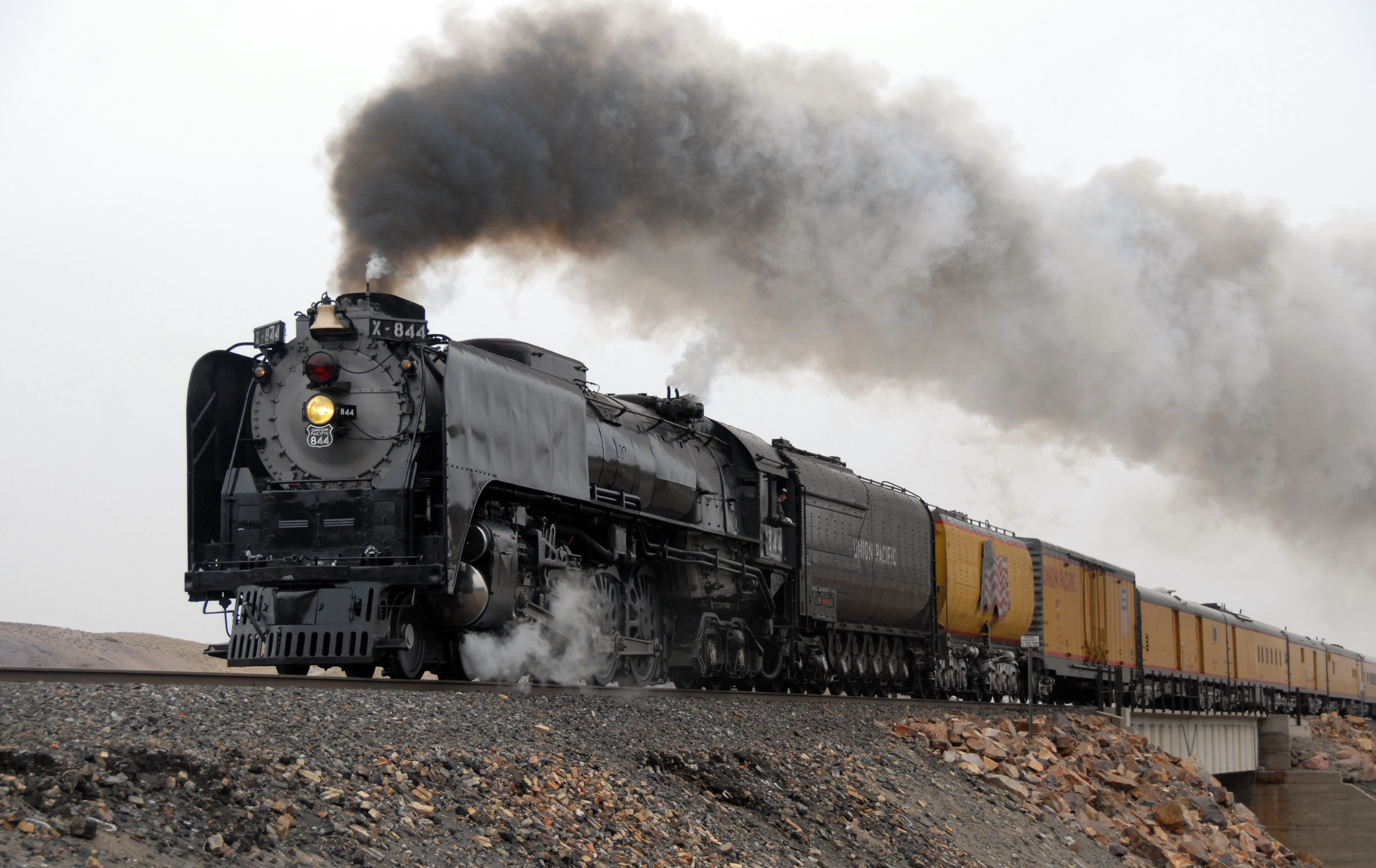
- No. 844 running through Painted Rocks, Nevada on April 15, 2009.
Type and origin
- Power type: Steam
- Builder: American Locomotive Company (Schenectady Works)
- Serial number: 72791
- Build date: December 22, 1944
- Rebuild date: 1960
Specifications
- Configuration
  - Whyte: 4-8-4
  - UIC: 2′D2′ h2
- Gauge: 4 ft 8 1/2 in (1,435 mm) standard gauge
- Leading dia.: 36 in (914 mm)
- Driver dia.: 80 in (2,032 mm)
- Trailing dia.: 42 in (1,067 mm)
- Wheelbase: Loco & tender: 98 ft 5 in (30.00 m)
- Length: 114 ft 2 5/8 in (34.81 m)
- Width: 11 ft 1 1/8 in (3.38 m)
- Height: 16 ft 2 in (4.93 m)
- Axle load: 66,622.5 lb (30,219.5 kg)
- Adhesive weight: 266,490 lb (120,878 kg)
- Loco weight: 486,340 lb (220,600 kg)
- Tender weight: 421,550 lb (191,212 kg)
- Total weight: 907,890 lb (411,812 kg)
- Fuel type: New: Coal; Now: No. 5 fuel oil
- Fuel capacity: 6,200 US gal (23,000 L)
- Water cap.: 23,500 US gal (89,000 L)
- Fuel consumption: 15–25 US gal (57–95 L) of fuel oil per mile 100–200 US gal (380–760 L) of water per mile
- Firebox
  - Grate area: 100.2 sq ft (9.31 m^{2}) (grate removed in 1945)
- Boiler: 86 3/16 in (2189.2 mm) diameter 100 in (2,540 mm) (OD)
- Boiler pressure: 300 lbf/in^{2} (2.07 MPa)
- Heating surface
  - Firebox: 442 sq ft (41.1 m^{2})
  - Tubes: 2,204 sq ft (204.8 m^{2})
  - Flues: 1,579 sq ft (146.7 m^{2})
  - Total surface: 4,225 sq ft (392.5 m^{2})
- Superheater
  - Type: Type A
  - Heating area: 1,400 sq ft (130 m^{2})
- Cylinders: Two, outside
- Cylinder size: 25 in × 32 in (635 mm × 813 mm)
- Valve gear: Walschaerts
- Valve type: Piston valves
- Loco brake: Air
- Train brakes: Air
- Couplers: Knuckle
Performance figures
- Maximum speed: 120 mph (190 km/h)
- Power output: 4,850 hp (3,620 kW)
- Tractive effort: 63,800 lbf (283.8 kN)
- Factor of adh.: 4.18
Career
- Operators: Union Pacific Railroad
- Class: FEF-3
- Numbers: UP 844; UP 8444
- Nicknames: The Living Legend
- Delivered: December 1944
- First run: 1944 (revenue service); 1960 (excursion service)
- Last run: 1959 (revenue service)
- Current owner: Union Pacific Railroad (Union Pacific heritage fleet)
- Disposition: Operational

Union Pacific 844 is a FEF-3 class 4-8-4 "Northern" type steam locomotive, owned and operated by the Union Pacific Railroad (UP) for its heritage fleet. Built in December 1944 by the American Locomotive Company (ALCO) of Schenectady, New York, No. 844 is one of four surviving FEF series locomotives and the only one in operation.

The locomotive operated in revenue service until 1959. It was stored along with the rest of the UP steam locomotive fleet. In 1960, railroad officials recognized the benefits of having a legacy steam program and retained No. 844 for special activities, the kernel of what has become the Union Pacific's heritage fleet. Today, it is one of UP's oldest serving locomotives and the only steam locomotive never to be retired by a North American Class I railroad.

== History ==
=== Background ===
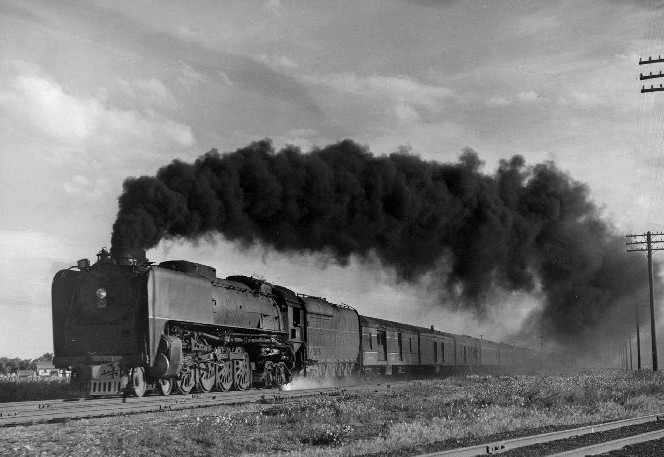
No. 844 hauling the Pony Express in 1949.

In the late 1930s, Union Pacific (UP) appointed Otto Jabelmann as vice president of research and mechanical standards, where he and his team began building a brand-new 4-8-4 design; the FEF class, which could handle both freight and passenger service. In 1937, the American Locomotive Company (ALCO) of Schenectady, New York, collaborated on building the first batch of FEFs, which were designated as FEF-1s and were the first UP steam locomotives to operate at a boiler pressure of 300 psi (2.07 MPa).

The FEF-3 could reach and regularly run at 120 mph; one locomotive reportedly pulled a 1,000-ton passenger train at 100 mph. Union Pacific considered all FEF classes to be capable of producing between 4,000 and 5,000 drawbar horsepower.

The FEF-3 class represented the apex of dual-service steam locomotive development; funds and research were being concentrated on the development of diesel-electric locomotives. Originally designed to burn coal, they were converted to run on fuel oil in 1946. Like the earlier FEF-1 and FEF-2 classes, the FEF-3 locomotives were ultimately reassigned to freight service.

UP 844 was the last steam locomotive delivered to the Union Pacific Railroad, constructed as a member of the FEF-3 class of 4-8-4 "Northern" type locomotives. Upon its entry into service, the locomotive spent most of its career pulling a variety of passenger trains, such as the Challenger, Idahoan, Los Angeles Limited, Overland Limited, Pacific Limited, and Portland Rose. From 1957 to 1959, UP 844 was reassigned to fast freight service in Nebraska when diesel-electric locomotives took over passenger service.

After commercial steam operations ended in 1959, No. 844 was retained to be kept as an experimental snow melter along with Challenger class No. 3710 while the rest of the FEF-3s were scrapped. In 1960, UP saw the potential of having a steam locomotive for public relations and excursions in a world where steam locomotives are a rare sight. As such, No. 844 was chosen for rebuilding and is now used on company and public excursion trains, along with hauling revenue freight trains during ferry moves, it has since become the only steam locomotive to never be fully retired from service by a North American Class I railroad.

=== Excursion service ===
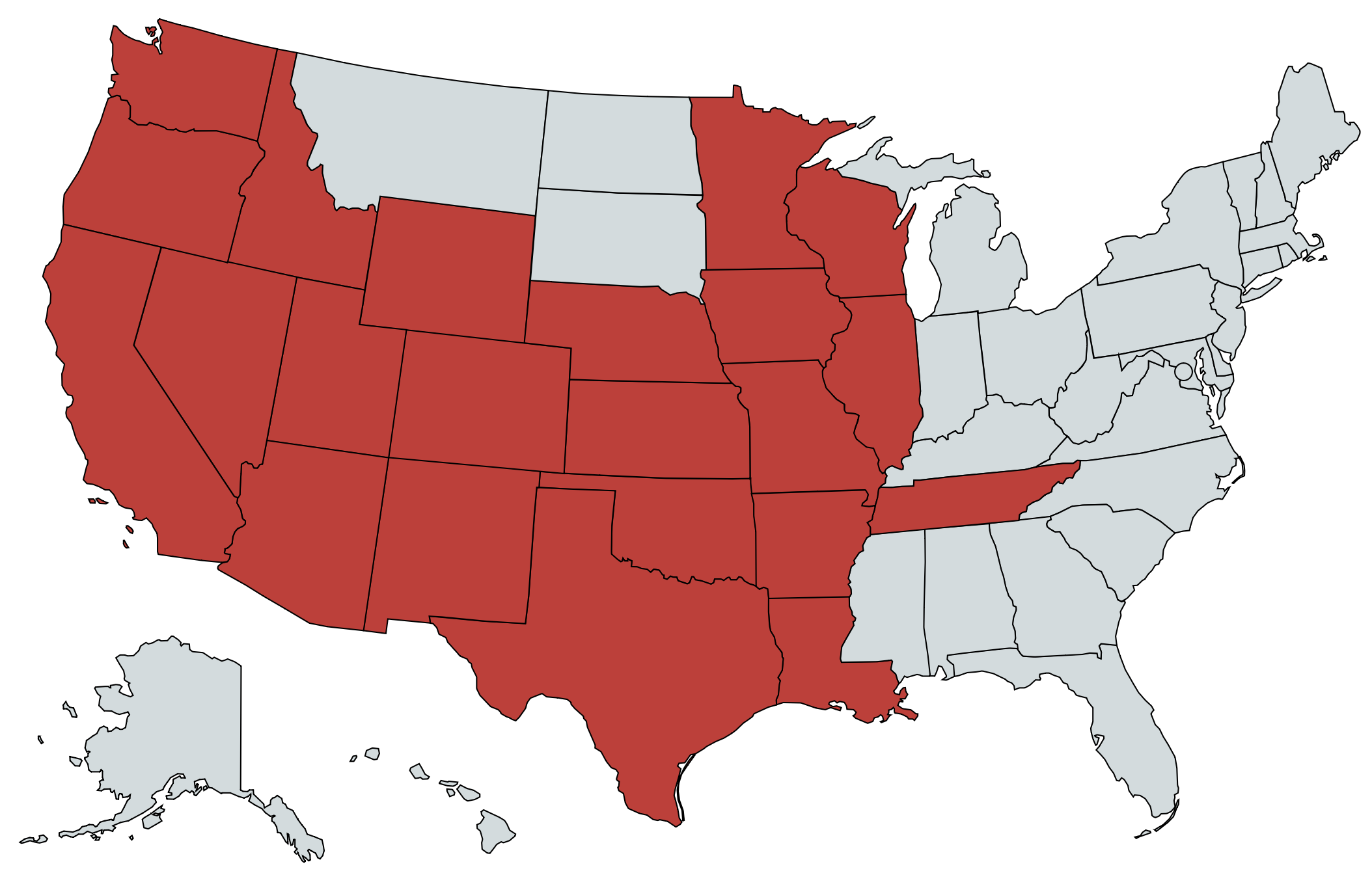
US states visited by No. 844 in excursion service.

Since 1960, No. 844 has run hundreds of thousands of miles as Union Pacific's publicity locomotive. The locomotive often pulled the annual Denver Post-sponsored Cheyenne Frontier Days train that ran round-trip from Cheyenne to Denver every July before it was discontinued in early 2019. In 1962, No. 844 was renumbered UP 8444 because the railroad had given the number 844 to an EMD GP30 locomotive.

No. 8444 appeared at Expo '74 in Spokane, Washington; the 1978 dedication of the Utah State Railroad Museum in Ogden, Utah; the 1984 World's Fair in New Orleans; and the 50th anniversary celebration of Los Angeles Union Passenger Terminal in 1989, when No. 844 performed a side-by-side run with Southern Pacific 4449. On February 14, 1975, it pulled Amtrak's San Francisco Zephyr from Denver, Colorado to Cheyenne, Wyoming. with a pair of EMD SDP40Fs. In 1981, it traveled to the opening of the California State Railroad Museum in Sacramento, along with Union Pacific 3985, which had recently been restored to operational condition.

In 1987, No. 8444 was repainted into UP's Greyhound Scheme and was invited to an event in 1989 to celebrate LAUPT's 50th anniversary along with No. 4449, UP E9A No. 951, SP E9A No. 6051, and ATSF F7A No. 347c. Then, No. 8444 raced No. 4449 up Cajon Pass on their respective trackage with No. 8444 winning by default as No. 4449 had to stop due to a roller bearing issue. (Note: No. 8444 was expected to reunite with No. 4449 in 1986, with the two scheduled to travel to Vancouver, British Columbia, for attendance in the Steam Expo event, as part of that year's World Exposition, Expo 86, but their participation was cancelled at the last moment, since Burlington Northern (BN) banned steam locomotives on their trackage, and UP tried and failed to gain permission to operate them over the Canadian Pacific Railway.) In June 1989, after UP GP30 No. 844 was retired from active service, No. 8444 was renumbered back to 844. (Note: The GP30 is now owned by Nevada State Railroad Museum in Boulder City, Nevada, and operates periodically at the Nevada State Railroad Museum Boulder City on excursion runs. Additionally, there is now an EMD SD70ACe on the UP roster numbered 8444.)

Over the weekend of October 14, 1990, No. 844 led a procession of special trains from Kansas City Union Station to Abilene, Kansas. for World War II veterans to celebrate the 100th birthday of U.S. President Dwight D. Eisenhower. The "Eisenhower Centennial Special" was composed of cars from the Union Pacific, Burlington Northern and Santa Fe Railway business fleets, with additional passenger cars provided by the Norfolk Southern and Chicago and North Western railroads. Also present in Abilene was General Eisenhower's command train, code-named "Bayonet", including the British A4 steam locomotive No. 60008 and communication and staff cars from WWII's European Theater of Operations.

After the end of the 1991 excursion season, No. 844 was put in the shop for a major running gear overhaul in addition to other repairs. During that time, No. 844 was repainted from the passenger greyhound scheme to the traditional black paint. It emerged from the shop in 1996.

On June 21, 1997, on the way to the National Railway Historical Society (NRHS)'s annual convention in Salt Lake City, Utah, No. 844 and Union Pacific's E units pulled 18 passenger cars on the Union Pacific's soon-to-close Tennessee Pass line, which included tracks on a narrow canyon shelf along the Arkansas River.

On June 24, 1999, while on display during Railfair '99, one of the 844's boiler tubes failed, and the locomotive was subsequently towed dead back to Cheyenne by the recently overhauled No. 3985. The tube was found to have been made of the wrong material during the overhaul in 1996, a discovery that prompted the replacement of the firebox in a complete overhaul that lasted from September 2001 to 2004. On September 9, 2004, the UP steam crew successfully test-fired the 4-8-4. It returned to operating service on November 10, 2004.

On May 18–19, 2007, No. 844 doubleheaded with No. 4449 to pull the "Puget Sound Excursion", a round trip from Tacoma to Everett, Washington, on BNSF Railway tracks.

On June 25 and 26, 2010, No. 844 made an excursion trip to Milliken, Colorado's, centennial celebration. In June 2012, No. 844 went to Omaha, Nebraska to be on display at the Union Pacific's Home Plate near the Charles Schwab Field for UP's 150th anniversary. In September 2012, No. 844 was used in "UP 150", a celebration of Union Pacific's 150th-anniversary celebration, hosted by the California State Railroad Museum (CSRM). During that time, No. 844's tender derailed on a tightly-curved track from the Union Pacific's Martinez Subdivision to the CSRM. The tender was rerailed at 7:30 p.m.

In June 2013, No. 844's gyrating Mars Light, installed in 1946, was removed because its mounting bolts had deteriorated. It was also announced that year that No. 844 and No. 3985 would eventually be joined in the Union Pacific steam locomotive heritage fleet by Big Boy No. 4014. After the 2013 season, No. 844 was taken out of service for boiler work required by a change in the water treatment. It spent the year 2014 in Cheyenne and then received an early 15-year inspection the following year.

No. 844 passing through Leavenworth, Kansas on October 15, 2016.

On June 16 and 17, 2016, No. 844 was test-fired. On July 12, the Union Pacific Steam Team took the locomotive on a "break-in run" as a sort of all-systems check and dress rehearsal for its return to service. The run was described as a complete success. On July 23, 2016, No. 844 pulled the annual Cheyenne Frontiers Day excursion.

In April 2017, No. 844 made its first run on the Oregon Short Line Railroad to celebrate the 92nd anniversary of the Boise Union Pacific Depot. Because of heavy snows and a wet spring, the trip was cut short, and the engine had to run light across the Malad River because of a washed-out bridge.

On July 21, 2018, while pulling the Cheyenne Frontier Days Special to Denver, Colorado, No. 844 accidentally struck and killed a pedestrian in Henderson, Colorado. The pedestrian was standing too close to the track photographing the train, and the operation of the train was not at fault. The train stopped immediately following the accident.

In December 2018, Union Pacific requested Federal Railroad Administration (FRA) waivers to exempt Nos. 844, 3985, and 4014 from federal Positive Train Control (PTC) requirements; in February 2019, the FRA officials responded that such waivers were not needed.

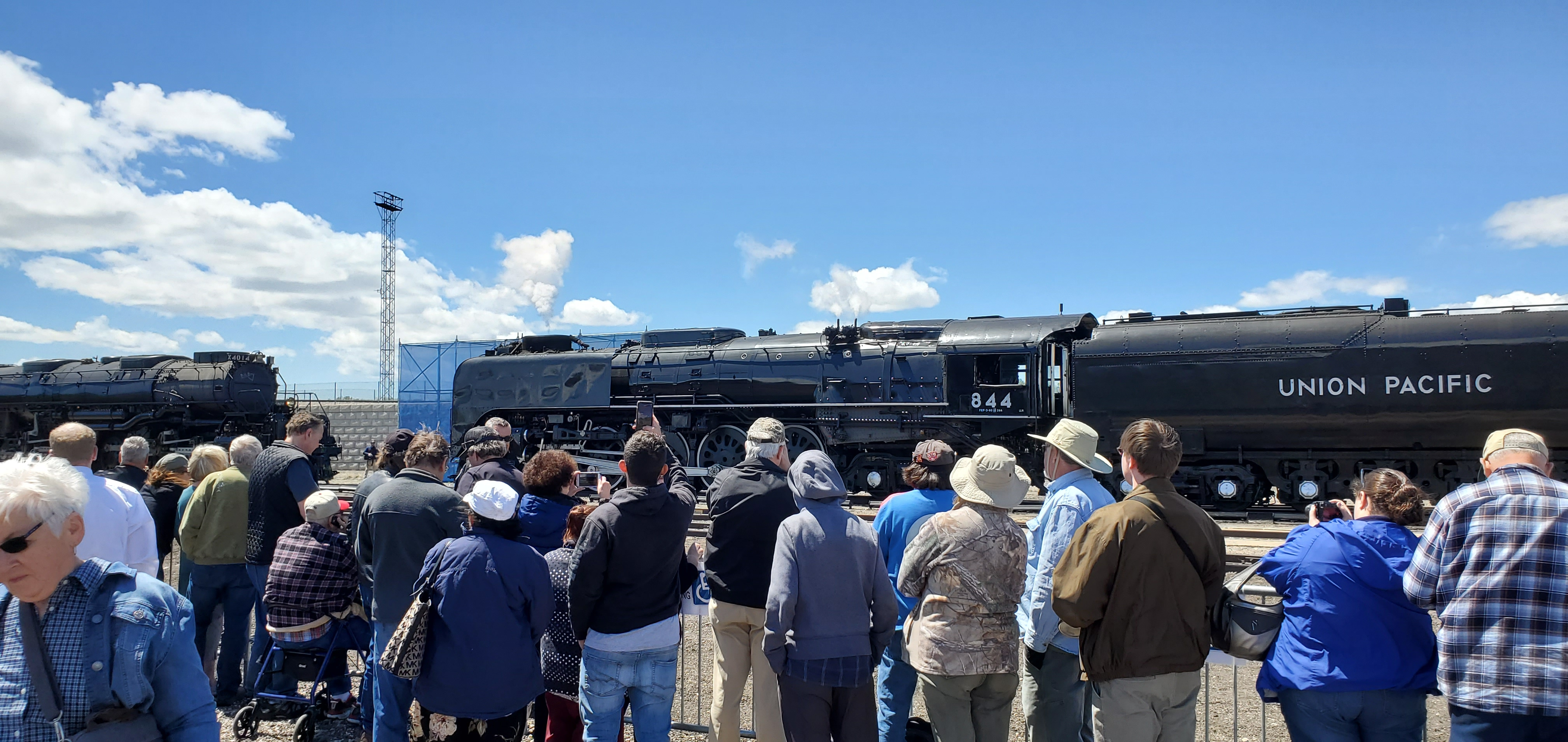
No. 844 (right) and No. 4014 on display in Ogden, Utah, in May 2019.

On May 4, 2019, No. 844 participated in the inaugural run of newly restored No. 4014. The train departed the historic Cheyenne Depot following a christening ceremony for No. 4014. The two locomotives arrived at the Ogden Union Station on May 9 for the city's Heritage Festival. They were on display at the station until May 12, when the return trip to Cheyenne began. They arrived at Cheyenne on May 19, concluding the first run of No. 4014 in excursion service.

Since January 2020, Nos. 844 and 4014 are the only two operational UP steam locomotives left on the active roster, following the retirement of No. 3985 from excursion service due to its poor mechanical condition. (Note: No. 3985 was eventually donated to the Railroading Heritage of Midwest America on April 28, 2022.) However, due to the COVID-19 pandemic in March 2020, UP cancelled all of its 2020 steam excursions and stated that Nos. 844 and 4014 would not operate for the 2020 operating season. UP eventually resumed excursion operations with No. 4014 beginning in August 2021. No. 844 did not undertake any excursions between 2019 and 2026, although it was confirmed that the locomotive was maintained to keep it in operational condition. UP also considered equipping the locomotive with PTC using a setup similar to the one on 4014.

On October 5, 2026, Union Pacific officially announced that No. 844 would be participating in the upcoming 2026 excursion season alongside No. 4014 between Greeley and Denver on November 21, 2026, marking its first excursion trip in seven years. On October 15, the locomotive was fired up, and the next day, it ran under its own power for the first time since 2019. On November 21, No. 844 and No. 4014 traveled from Cheyenne to Denver, where they will stay until returning to Cheyenne on November 24.

== Film history ==
No. 844, then numbered as No. 8444, was documented in the 1981 film "Eighty-Four Forty-Four" by the Union Pacific Railroad. Some of those clips would be later used for the opening and closing credits of the PBS show Shining Time Station, which ran from 1989 until 1995 (including the four hour-long Family Specials).

No. 844 also appears in Extreme Trains in the episode "Steam Train", in which it pulled the Frontier Days special from Denver to Cheyenne.

No. 844 also makes an appearance in the 2nd episode of the 3rd season on the TLC TV series, Mostly True Stories?: Urban Legends Revealed.

In the 1990 PBS special Ghost Trains of the Old West, No. 8444, as it was numbered at the time of filming, is seen pulling a Union Pacific diesel locomotive and passenger train through Wyoming.

No. 844 (and several other restored steam locomotives) appear in the music video with the Pat Metheny Group's "Last Train Home".

The 2014 short film "Locomotive Song" features No. 844—particularly its running gear—accompanied by the song of the same name by boogie-woogie pianist Honey Piazza.
