= Extreme Trains =

- DVD Cover for Extreme Trains with Matt Bown
- Starring: Matt Bown – Host
- Country of origin: United States
- Original language: English
- No. of seasons: 1
- No. of episodes: 8

Production
- Running time: approx. 45 minutes

Original release
- Network: History Channel
- Release: November 11 – December 30, 2008

Extreme Trains is a television program on the History Channel that describes the daily operations of railroads in the United States, from coal trains to passenger trains and famous routes. It is hosted by Matt Bown, a train conductor for Pan Am Railways in Maine, whose interest is railways and the technology of them. In the show Matt is living his lifelong dream.

The series was first aired in the United States on November 11, 2008 and ran until December 30, 2008. The show has since been shown in the United Kingdom in April 2009.

== Conception and development ==
History Channel program executive said the show was developed to appeal to the channels core audience, who "love to be wowed by big machinery and fun facts". Bown was chosen to host the show after responding to an open-call audition. McKillop said Bown "has a sense of authenticity and a wonderful, boyish enthusiasm...when the camera's on him, he's infectious."

== Production ==
The show's producers occasionally had difficulty convincing railroads to participate in the show, due to the possibility of film crews disrupting crews and workers. The show's crew was required to take a special safety course before filming with Amtrak.

== Broadcast history ==
Episode Number	Episode Name	Original Air Date	Description	Featured train
1	Coal Train	November 11, 2008	Journey of a Norfolk Southern coal train from a coal mine to a PPL Electric power station in Pennsylvania	Norfolk Southern coal train
2	Freight Train	November 18, 2008	High priority freight train from Los Angeles to Dallas/Fort Worth	BNSF double container stack train
3	High Speed Train	November 25, 2008	Riding the Acela train from Washington Union Station to South Station (Boston)	Acela Express
4	Ice Cold Express	December 2, 2008	A look into refrigeration trains	Union Pacific Produce Express
5	Steam Train	December 9, 2008	A journey with the Union Pacific 844 steam locomotive	Union Pacific 844
6	Overnight Traveler	December 16, 2008	Riding Amtrak's Empire Builder train from Chicago to Seattle	Empire Builder
7	Circus Train	December 23, 2008	The circus train from Ringling Brothers and Barnum & Bailey	Ringling Bros. and Barnum & Bailey Circus train
8	Transcontinental	December 30, 2008	The Union Pacific Transcontinental line from Omaha to Sacramento	Union Pacific Transcontinental

== Reception ==
Extreme Trains received mixed reviews from critics. Library Journal recommended the DVD set, with reviewer Lawrence Maxted commending Matt Bown's enthusiasm and "solid job of explaining rail operations." Maxted said the show featured "superb camerawork" and "dramatic background music", adding that the show would be "coveted by rail fans and of interest to general viewers". The Times called the show "trainspotting for adrenaline junkies" giving railroading a "full-on, hyperbolic treatment". Writing for the Daily News (New York), David Hinckley said Extreme Trains was "not a bad show", but he criticized Bown's hosting style and the focus on technical details. Hinckley said that Bown "borders on self-parody" with his "dramatic inflection" describing "every move to the camera lens". He said the show would be better if Bown would "trust the trains" and not "frame a routine daily coal train run as a life-or-death drama", saying that Bown's tone makes it seem "a miracle any train completes its run at all".
