= Perry T. Egbert =

American engineer

Perry T. Egbert (April 22, 1893 – July 13, 1970) was an American engineer specializing in internal combustion engines, particularly diesel engines. Most of his career was spent at the American Locomotive Company (ALCo), America's pre-eminent manufacturer of steam and diesel locomotives in those times.

Egbert graduated from Cornell University in 1915 with a degree in mechanical engineering and, after a stint in the military during World War I, taught engineering there in 1919 and 1920. In 1921 he became ALCo's technical representative in East Asia, where his work included efforts to provide diesel engines for the Peking Suiyuan Railway. Following the acquisition of the firm of McIntosh & Seymour in 1929 he was placed in charge of ALCo's diesel engine development program. He became manager of railroad diesel sales in 1934 and vice president in charge of diesel locomotive sales in 1944. After World War II, he led ALCo's shift from steam to diesel locomotive production. He became president of the company in 1952. Perry Egbert had 3 sons. Perry, Leigh and John (12/14/30- 12/08/67) . John married Marilyn Robinson. They had 3 children. Leigh (5/23/56), Perry(4/59) and Alexandra. Leigh married Lynn Pfuntner 7/2/77. They have 1 daughter Elizabeth (12/16/85). Perry has 2 daughters. Kristin and Shelby.
