= Portland Rose (train) =

Passenger train

Portland Rose originally Portland Limited
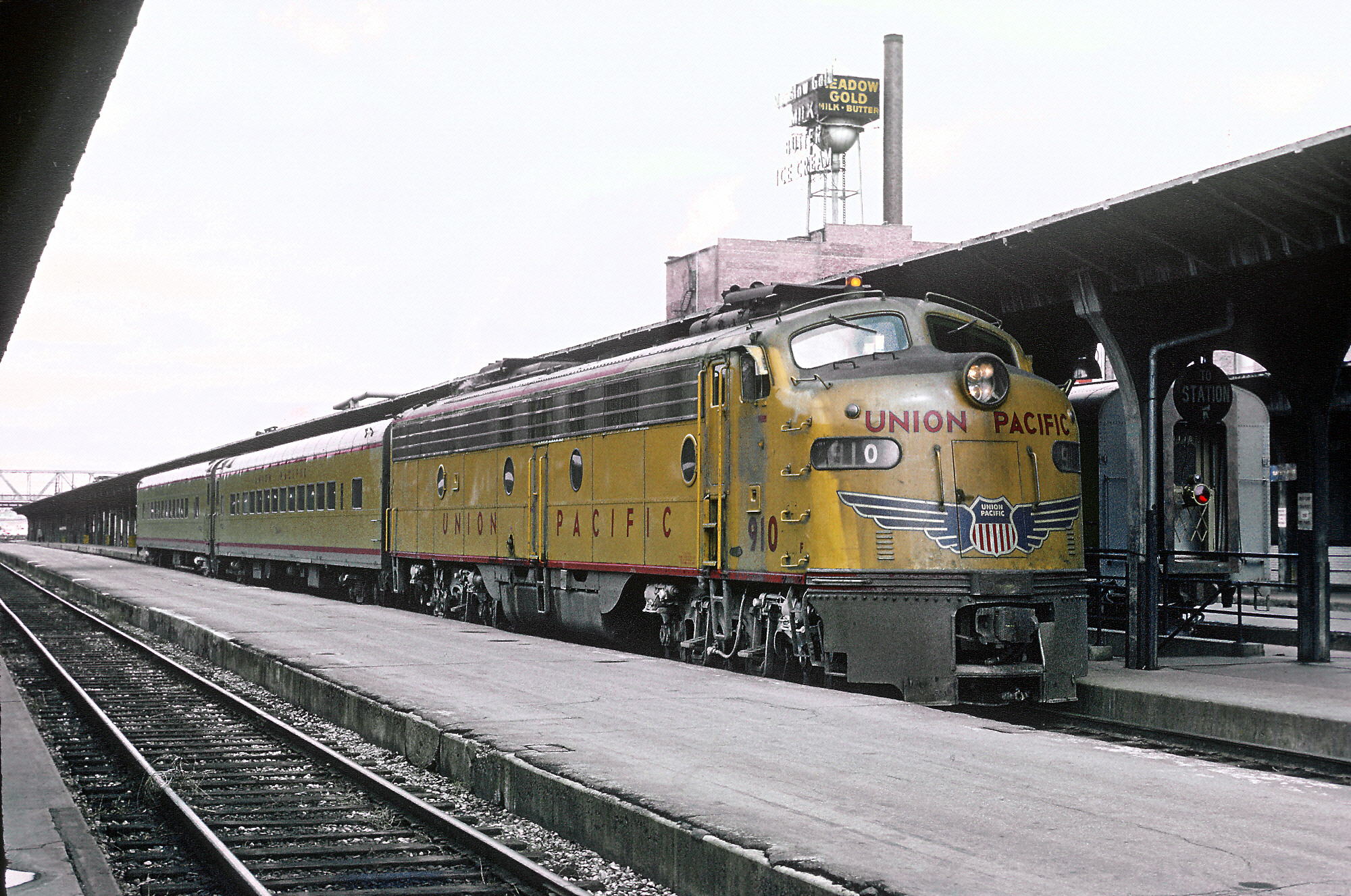
- The final remnant of the Portland Rose at Denver Union Station, reduced to just two coaches on the eve of Amtrak

Overview
- Service type: Inter-city rail
- Status: Discontinued
- Locale: Central and Western United States
- First service: 1923
- Last service: 1971
- Former operators: UP and CNW/MILW

Route
- Termini: East: Chicago, Illinois; Cheyenne, Wyoming (1942); Denver, Colorado; St. Louis, Missouri; Kansas City, Missouri (1964); West: Portland, Oregon; Pool service to Tacoma and Seattle, Washington
- Train numbers: 17 (westbound); 18 (eastbound)
- Line used: Overland Route

Technical
- Track gauge: 4 ft 8 1/2 in (1,435 mm)

The Portland Rose (renamed from Portland Limited in 1930) was a named passenger train that featured through-service to Portland, Tacoma, and Seattle. It was operated by the Union Pacific Railroad, but sections of the train scheduled east of Omaha operated over the Chicago and North Western Railway before 1955, and after over the Milwaukee Road.

== Features ==
The Portland Limited featured a lady's lounge, men's club, sightseeing salon, library, barbershop, and bath with shower which remained intact through the entire route. Renamed Portland Rose in 1930, the train was assigned heavyweight passenger equipment, but was regularly upgraded with streamlined equipment in line with the premiere "city trains". The 1930s service continued these features, adding a fully equipped soda fountain, a radio, and a glass-enclosed sun parlor.

== Service changes and demise ==
The 1935 introduction of the City of Portland replaced the Portland Rose as the premier Union Pacific train to the Northwest, but the Rose remained important and operated through to the establishment of Amtrak in 1971.

In 1937, the year that Union Pacific introduced the Chicago–Los Angeles discount tourist-class train, The Challenger, Portland Rose split sections at Omaha, one through section to Chicago over the CNW, the other through to St. Louis over the Wabash. A section of Challenger sleepers were at that time exchanged between the Portland Rose and The Challenger (San Francisco #87/88) at Green River.

In 1942, Cheyenne, Wyoming, then became the east terminus of the Pacific Rose, (temporarily designated as trains 11/12) with a through section carried between there and Chicago by the Los Angeles Limited (trains #1/2), and another section via Denver and through Kansas to Kansas City and St. Louis carried by the City of St. Louis.

With the demise of the Pony Express, with which it had been combined east of Denver, the Portland Rose operated under that name alone from Portland to St. Louis as trains 17/18 by way of Cheyenne and Denver.

But by 1964, the Portland Rose terminated in Kansas City and in late 1969, service was curtailed to Denver.

In continuous service from its inception, the Rose outlasted some other more premiere Union Pacific trains until 1971, when Amtrak took over the nation's passenger services.

== Gallery ==
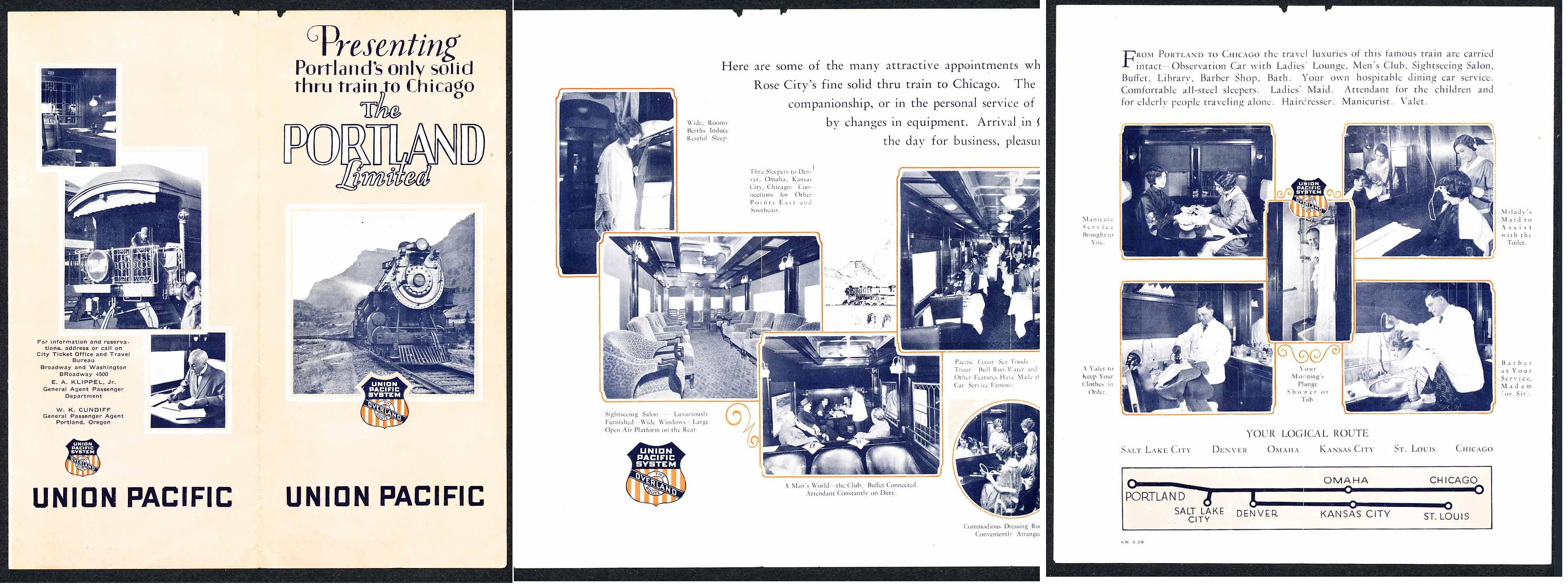
Portland Limited brochure, 1923

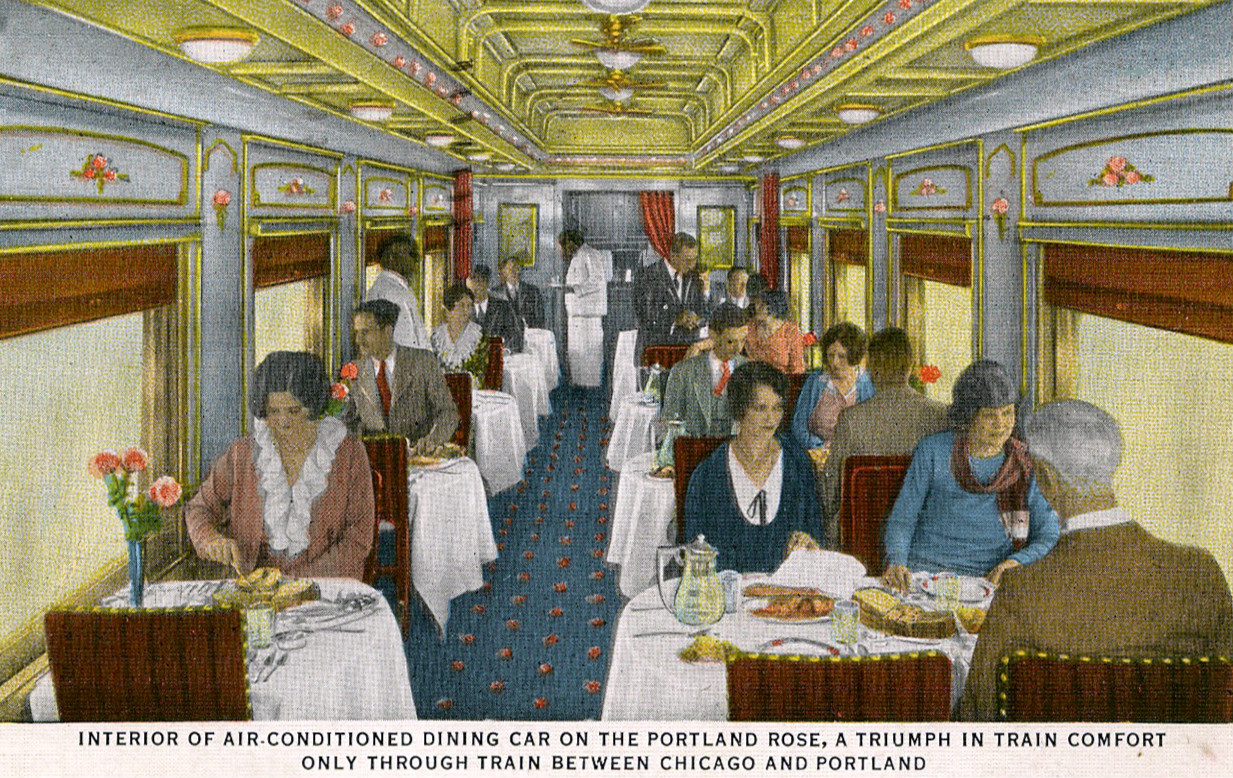
Inaugural Portland Rose decor of the 1930s heavyweight era dining car

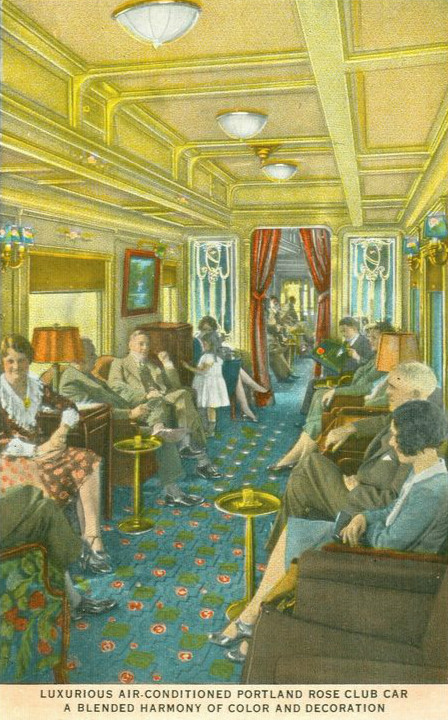
Portland Rose heavyweight club car, c. 1930s

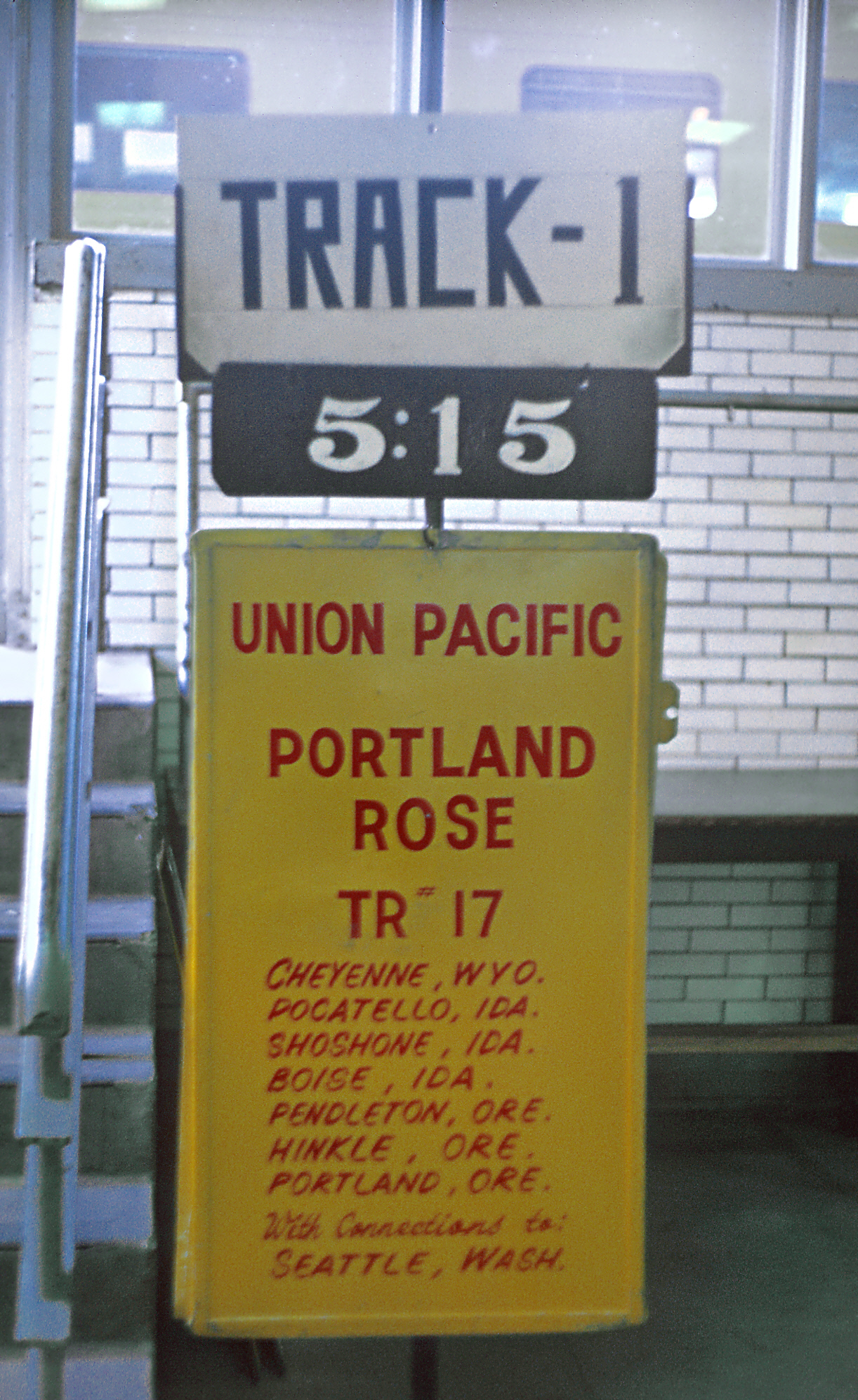
Portland Rose track sign at Denver Union Station

== Legacy ==
As part of the Union Pacific Heritage Fleet, 44-seat coach No. 5473 was renamed the Portland Rose in 1990.
