= List of preserved Union Pacific Railroad rolling stock =

A large quantity of rolling stock formerly owned and operated by Union Pacific Railroad have been preserved in museums, on tourist railroads, and various other locations all across North America.

== Preserved steam locomotives ==
Photograph	Number	Build date	Builder	Class	Wheel arrangement (Whyte notation)	Disposition and location	Notes	References
	237	August 1906	Baldwin Locomotive Works (BLW)	C-2	2-8-0	On static display at the Hastings Museum in Hastings, Nebraska		
	264	May 1907	Baldwin Locomotive Works (BLW)	C-2	2-8-0	On static display at the Nevada Southern Railroad Museum at Boulder City, Nevada		
	407	July 1900	Baldwin Locomotive Works (BLW)	C-57	2-8-0	On static display at Sidney, Nebraska		
	421	September 1900	Baldwin Locomotive Works (BLW)	C-57	2-8-0	On static display at City Park in Fairbury, Nebraska		
	423	September 1900	Baldwin Locomotive Works (BLW)	C-57	2-8-0	On static display at Gering, Nebraska		
	428	October 1900	Baldwin Locomotive Works (BLW)	C-57	2-8-0	Undergoing restoration at the Illinois Railway Museum, Union, Illinois		
	437	November 1900	Baldwin Locomotive Works (BLW)	C-57	2-8-0	On static display at the Stuhr Museum in Grand Island, Nebraska		
	440	1900	Baldwin Locomotive Works (BLW)	C-57	2-8-0	On static display at Antigo, Wisconsin		
	460	June 1901	Baldwin Locomotive Works (BLW)	C-57	2-8-0	On static display at the Pony Express Museum in Marysville, Kansas		
	477	July 1901	Baldwin Locomotive Works (BLW)	C-57	2-8-0	On static display at Kenwood Park at Salina, Kansas		
	480	March 1903	Baldwin Locomotive Works (BLW)	C-57	2-8-0	On static display at Memorial Park in North Platte, Nebraska		
	481	April 1903	Baldwin Locomotive Works (BLW)	C-57	2-8-0	On static display at the Rails and Trails Museum in Kearney, Nebraska		
	485	April 1903	Baldwin Locomotive Works (BLW)	C-57	2-8-0	On static display at the Dawson County Museum at Lexington, Nebraska		
	529	March 1903	Baldwin Locomotive Works (BLW)	C-57	2-8-0	On static display at the Northwest Railway Museum at Snoqualmie, Washington		
	535	1903	Baldwin Locomotive Works (BLW)	C-57	2-8-0	On static display at the Railroad Heritage Park in Laramie, Wyoming		
	561	1906	Baldwin Locomotive Works (BLW)	C-2	2-8-0	On static display at the Pawnee Park at Columbus, Nebraska		
	616	July 1907	Baldwin Locomotive Works (BLW)	C-2	2-8-0	Undergoing cosmetic restoration for the potential of operational restoration at the Lakeview Park in Nampa, Idaho		
	618	July 1907	Baldwin Locomotive Works (BLW)	C-57	2-8-0	Undergoing restoration to operating condition at the Heber Valley Railroad in Utah		
	737	1887	Baldwin Locomotive Works (BLW)	-	4-4-0	On static display at the Double-T Agricultural Museum in Stevinson, California		
	814	September 1937	American Locomotive Company (ALCO)	FEF-1	4-8-4	On static display at the RailsWest Railroad Museum in Council Bluffs, Iowa		
	833	October 1939	American Locomotive Company (ALCO)	FEF-2	4-8-4	On static display at the Utah State Railroad Museum in Ogden, Utah		
	838	December 1944	American Locomotive Company (ALCO)	FEF-3	4-8-4	In storage as source of spare parts based in Cheyenne, Wyoming		
	844	December 1944	American Locomotive Company (ALCO)	FEF-3	4-8-4	Operational, never retired by UP		
	1242	October 1890	Cooke Locomotive and Machine Works (CL&MW)	T-57	4-6-0	On static display at the Cheyenne Botanic Gardens in Cheyenne, Wyoming		
	1243	October 1890	Cooke Locomotive and Machine Works (CL&MW)	T-57	4-6-0	On static display at the Durham Museum in Omaha, Nebraska		
	2005	April 1911	Baldwin Locomotive Works (BLW)	MK-1	2-8-2	On static display at Ross Park in Pocatello, Idaho		
	2295	June 1920	American Locomotive Company (ALCO)	MK-9	2-8-2	On static display at the Boise Depot in Boise, Idaho		
	2537	December 1918	American Locomotive Company (ALCO)	MK-7	2-8-2	On static display at Jefferson Park at Walla Walla, Washington		
	2564	February 1921	American Locomotive Company (ALCO)	MK-10	2-8-2	On static display at the Southern California Railway Museum in Perris, California.		
	3203	May 1905	Baldwin Locomotive Works (BLW)	P-2	4-6-2	Undergoing restoration to operating condition at the Oregon Rail Heritage Center in Portland, Oregon	Built as Oregon Railroad and Navigation Company 197, renumbered as UP 3203 and is being restored as 197.	
	3206	August 1904	American Locomotive Company (ALCO)	P-1	4-6-2	On static display at the Inland Northwest Rail Museum in Reardan, Washington	Built as Oregon Railroad and Navigation Company 192, renumbered as UP 3206.	
	3977	June 1943	American Locomotive Company (ALCO)	4664-4	4-6-6-4	On static display at Cody Park in North Platte, Nebraska		
	3985	July 1943	American Locomotive Company (ALCO)	4664-4	4-6-6-4	Undergoing restoration to operational condition at the Railroading Heritage of Midwest America in Silvis, Illinois		
	4004	September 1941	American Locomotive Company (ALCO)	4884-1	4-8-8-4	On static display at Holliday Park in Cheyenne, Wyoming		
	4005	September 1941	American Locomotive Company (ALCO)	4884-1	4-8-8-4	On static display at the Forney Transportation Museum, Denver, Colorado	Involved in an accident and failed oil conversion.	
	4006	September 1941	American Locomotive Company (ALCO)	4884-1	4-8-8-4	On static display at the National Museum of Transportation, St. Louis, Missouri		
	4012	November 1941	American Locomotive Company (ALCO)	4884-1	4-8-8-4	On static display at the Steamtown National Historic Site, Scranton, Pennsylvania		
	4014	November 1941	American Locomotive Company (ALCO)	4884-1	4-8-8-4	Operational by UP		
	4017	December 1941	American Locomotive Company (ALCO)	4884-1	4-8-8-4	On static display at the National Railroad Museum, Green Bay, Wisconsin		
	4018	December 1941	American Locomotive Company (ALCO)	4884-1	4-8-8-4	On static display at the Museum of the American Railroad, Frisco, Texas		
	4023	November 1944	American Locomotive Company (ALCO)	4884-2	4-8-8-4	On static display at Kenefick Park, Omaha, Nebraska		
	4420	1914	Lima Locomotive Works (LLW)	-	0-6-0	Undergoing restoration at the Evanston Roundhouse		
	4436	March 1918	Baldwin Locomotive Works (BLW)	S-5 or S-51	0-6-0	On static display at the Utah State Railroad Museum in Ogden, Utah		
	4439	1918	Baldwin Locomotive Works (BLW)	S-5	0-6-0	On static display at the Travel Town Museum, Los Angeles, California		
	4442	1918	Baldwin Locomotive Works (BLW)	-	0-6-0	On static display at the Clark County Museum in Clark County, Nevada		
	4455	1920	Lima Locomotive Works (LLW)	S-6	0-6-0	On static display at the Colorado Railroad Museum in Golden, Colorado		
	4466	October 1920	Lima Locomotive Works (LLW)	S-6 (Cabside class S-51)	0-6-0	On static display at the California State Railroad Museum in Sacramento, California		
	5511	September 1923	Baldwin Locomotive Works (BLW)	TTT-6	2-10-2	Undergoing restoration to operational condition at the Railroading Heritage of Midwest America in Silvis, Illinois		
	6051	1907	Baldwin Locomotive Works (BLW)	C-2	2-8-0	On static display at Fairmount Park in Riverside, California		
	6072	December 1907	American Locomotive Company (ALCO)	C-2	2-8-0	On static display at Wyman Park in Fort Riley, Kansas		
	9000	1926	American Locomotive Company (ALCO)	UP-1	4-12-2	On static display at the RailGiants Train Museum, in Pomona, California.	Prototype of the 9000 class, last of the 9000s to be retired.	

== Preserved diesel locomotives ==
Photograph	Number	Build date	Builder	Model	Wheel arrangement	Disposition and location	Notes	References
	200	April 1954	Electro-Motive Division (EMD)	GP9	B-B	Operational on the Nickel Plate Express		
	296	September 1954	Electro-Motive Division (EMD)	GP9	B-B	Operational at the Heber Valley Railroad in Heber City, Utah		
	300	September 1955	Electro-Motive Division (EMD)	GP9	B-B	Undergoing restoration at the Western Pacific Railroad Museum in Portola, California	Originally built as Western Pacific 725	
	306	September 1955	Electro-Motive Division (EMD)	GP9	B-B	On static display at the Western Pacific Railroad Museum in Portola, California	Originally built as Western Pacific 731	
	844	August 1962	Electro-Motive Division (EMD)	GP30	B-B	Operational at the Nevada State Railroad Museum in Boulder City, Nevada		
	909	August 1961	Electro-Motive Division (EMD)	E9A	C-C	On static display at the Louisiana Steam Train Association in New Orleans, Louisiana		
	912	December 1963	Electro-Motive Division (EMD)	E9A	C-C	On static display at the C&O Heritage Center in Clifton Forge, Virginia, as NYC 4096		
	942	May 1953	Electro-Motive Division (EMD)	E8A	C-C	Operational at the Southern California Railway Museum in Perris, California.		
	949	May 1955	Electro-Motive Division (EMD)	E9A	C-C	Stored with the Union Pacific heritage fleet based in Cheyenne, Wyoming		
	951	May 1955	Electro-Motive Division (EMD)	E9A	C-C	Stored with the Union Pacific heritage fleet based in Cheyenne, Wyoming		
	966B		Electro-Motive Division (EMD)	E9B	C-C	Awaiting restoration at the Railroading Heritage of Midwest America in Silvis, Illinois		
	1000	October 1939	Electro-Motive Division (EMD)	NW2	B-B	Operational at the Nevada State Railroad Museum in Boulder City, Nevada		
	1001	May 1940	Electro-Motive Division (EMD)	NW2	B-B	On static display at the Western Pacific Railroad Museum in Portola, California		
	1011	July 1940	Electro-Motive Division (EMD)	NW2	B-B	On static display at Heber City, Utah		
	1098	March 1942	American Locomotive Company (ALCO)	S2	B-B	Boone & Scenic Valley Railroad	Built for TRRA.	
	1848	August 1988	General Electric (GE)	B40-8	B-B	Operational at the Illinois Railway Museum, Union, Illinois.		
	2804	June 1966	General Electric (GE)	U28C	C-C	On static display at the National Museum of Transportation, St. Louis, Missouri	Sectioned	
	3105	June 1979	Electro-Motive Division (EMD)	SD40-2C	C-C	On static display at the RailGiants Train Museum, in Pomona, California.		
	3423	March 1978	Electro-Motive Division (EMD)	SD40-2	C-C	Operational at the Branson Scenic Railway (BSR) in Branson, Missouri		
	3593	August 1979	Electro-Motive Division (EMD)	SD40-2	C-C	Donated to the American Heartland Railroad Society in Sioux City, Iowa.	Former "Desert Victory" unit, to be returned to this livery by November.	
	6900	April 1969	Electro-Motive Division (EMD)	DDA40X	D-D	On static display at the Kenefick Park, Omaha, Nebraska		
	6901	June 1969	Electro-Motive Division (EMD)	DDA40X	D-D	On static display at the Ross Park in Pocatello, Idaho.		
	6911	September 1969	Electro-Motive Division (EMD)	DDA40X	D-D	On static display at the Mexico Museum of Technology in Mexico City, Mexico		
	6913	October 1969	Electro-Motive Division (EMD)	DDA40X	D-D	On static display at the Museum of the American Railroad in Frisco, Texas		
	6915	October 1969	Electro-Motive Division (EMD)	DDA40X	D-D	On static display at the RailGiants Train Museum, in Pomona, California		
	6916	November 1969	Electro-Motive Division (EMD)	DDA40X	D-D	On static display at the Utah State Railroad Museum in Ogden, Utah		
	6922	December 1969	Electro-Motive Division (EMD)	DDA40X	D-D	On static display at Cody Park, North Platte, Nebraska.		
	6925	June 1970	Electro-Motive Division (EMD)	DDA40X	D-D	was neglected in Chamberlain, South Dakota until Midwest Rail Preservation Society bought it.		
	6930	August 1970	Electro-Motive Division (EMD)	DDA40X	D-D	On static display, to be restored to operating condition at the Illinois Railway Museum, Union, Illinois.	Originally donated to Smoky Hill Railway & Historical Society (Kansas City area); traded and moved to the IRM in 1991.	
	6936	January 1971	Electro-Motive Division (EMD)	DDA40X	D-D	Operational at the Railroading Heritage of Midwest America in Silvis, Illinois		
	6938	January 1971	Electro-Motive Division (EMD)	DDA40X	D-D	on static display at Little Rock, Arkansas		
	6944	August 1971	Electro-Motive Division (EMD)	DDA40X	D-D	On static display at the National Museum of Transportation in St. Louis, Missouri		
	6946	September 1971	Electro-Motive Division (EMD)	DDA40X	D-D	On static display at Western Pacific Railroad Museum in Portola, California		
	7773	May 1979	General Electric (GE)	B30-7	B-B			
	8755	January 1979	Electro-Motive Division (EMD)	SD40T-2	C-C	Stored at Fire Training Academy, at San Antonio, Texas	Originally built as Southern Pacific 8540	
	9950	April 1980	Electro-Motive Division (EMD)	SD40-2	C-C	On static display at the Western America Railroad Museum in Barstow, California	Originally built as Missouri Pacific 3320	
	9871	March 1980	Electro-Motive Division (EMD)	SD40T-2	C-C	On static display at the Colorado Railroad Museum in Golden, Colorado	Originally built as D&RGW 5401	
	903999	February 1947	General Electric (GE)	44-ton	B-B	Owned by the Danbury Railroad Museum at Danbury, Connecticut		

== Preserved rebuilt diesel locomotives ==
Photograph	Number	Build date	Original builder	Rebuild date	Rebuilder	Model	Wheel arrangement	Disposition and location	Notes	References
	96	November 1950	Electro-Motive Division (EMD)	November 30, 1982	UP's Omaha shops	SW10	B-B	Operational at the Oregon Rail Heritage Foundation in Portland, Oregon		
	427B	August 1959	Electro-Motive Division (EMD)	October 24, 1979	ICG's Paducah, Kentucky shops	SD20	C-C	Operational at the Illinois Railway Museum in Union, Illinois		
	936B	October 1955	Electro-Motive Division (EMD)	June 1992	VMV Enterprises (VMVX)	E9BM	C-C	Stored with the Union Pacific heritage fleet based in Cheyenne, Wyoming		
	7362	May 1966	Electro-Motive Division (EMD)	April 10, 1981	SP's Sacramento shops	SD40R	C-C	On static display at Mid-Plains Community College in North Platte, Nebraska	Originally built as Southern Pacific 8475	

== Preserved electric locomotives ==
Photograph	Number	Build date	Builder	Model	Disposition and location	Notes	References
	LA&SL E-100	August 1923	Baldwin-Westinghouse	50-ton	Under ownership of the Orange Empire Railway Museum based in Perris, California		

== Preserved gas turbine-electric locomotives ==
Photograph	Number	Build date	Builder	Generation	Wheel arrangement	Disposition and location	Notes	References
	X-18	August 1960	General Electric (GE)	3rd	(C-C)+(C-C)	On static display at the Illinois Railway Museum in Union, Illinois		
	X-26	February 1961	General Electric (GE)	3rd	(C-C)+(C-C)	On static display at the Utah State Railroad Museum in Ogden, Utah		

== Preserved passenger cars ==
Photograph	Number	Build date	Builder	Type	Disposition and Location	Notes	References
	T8	1908	McKeen	RPO Trailer Car	Illinois Railway Museum in Union, Illinois		
	102	1926	Pullman Company	Business Car	California State Railroad Museum in Sacramento, California		
	105	1917	Pullman Company	Business-Observation Car	Operational, Western Pacific Railroad Museum in Portola, California		
	115	1912	Pullman-Standard	Business Car	Operational at Railroading Heritage of Midwest America in Silvis, Illinois.	Named "Selma"	
	140	1928	Pullman Company	Business Car	Operational at Railroading Heritage of Midwest America in Silvis, Illinois.	Named "Stanford"	
	204	1922	Pullman Company	Rules Examiner	Southern California Railway Museum in Perris, California.		
	501	1928	Pullman Company	Chair Car	Illinois Railway Museum in Union, Illinois		
	542	1926	PC&M	Chair Car	Southern California Railway Museum in Perris, California.	LA&SL	
	692	1911	Pullman Company	Coach	Southern California Railway Museum in Perris, California.	OSL	
	1432	1950	Budd Company	10-6 Sleeping	Operational at the Illinois Railway Museum in Union, Illinois	Named "Pacific Peak". Currently lettered for the CB&Q.	
	1446	1950	Budd Company	10-6 Sleeping car	Operational, owned by Webb Rail	Named "Pacific Union"	
	1530	1924	PC&M	Dormitory Club	Southern California Railway Museum in Perris, California.		
	2065	1914	Pullman Company	Railway Post Office	Southern California Railway Museum in Perris, California.		
	3669	1921	Pullman Company	Dining car	Static display, Travel Town Museum, Los Angeles, California		
	4051	1928	Pullman	Buffet-Lounge	Southern California Railway Museum in Perris, California.		
	4801	-	-	Dining car	On static display at the Colorado Railroad Museum in Golden, Colorado.		
	5016	1959	St. Louis Car Company	Dining car	Awaiting restoration at Railroading Heritage of Midwest America in Silvis, Illinois.		
	5442	1953	American Car & Foundry	44 Seat Coach	On static display at the Colorado Railroad Museum in Golden, Colorado.		
	5468	1953	American Car & Foundry	44 Seat Coach	Operational at Railroading Heritage of Midwest America in Silvis, Illinois.	Named "Katy Flyer"	
	5473	1953	American Car & Foundry	44 Seat Coach	Operational at Railroading Heritage of Midwest America in Silvis, Illinois.	Named "Portland Rose"	
	5480	1953	American Car & Foundry	44 Seat Coach	Operational at Railroading Heritage of Midwest America in Silvis, Illinois.	Named "Sunshine Special"	
	5486	1953	American Car & Foundry	44 Seat Coach	Operational at Railroading Heritage of Midwest America in Silvis, Illinois.	Named "City of Salina"	
	5746	1962	St. Louis Car Company	Postal Storage Car	Awaiting restoration at Railroading Heritage of Midwest America in Silvis, Illinois.		
	5812	1949	American Car & Foundry	Baggage-RPO	National Museum of Transportation in St. Louis, Missouri	UPMW #903673	
	5810	January 1942	Pullman Company	Floor Plan 7470	Static display, Western Pacific Railroad Museum in Portola, California		
	6636	1937	Pullman Company	Sleeping car	Static display, Travel Town Museum, Los Angeles, California		
	LA-701	1937	Pullman Company	-	Static display, Travel Town Museum, Los Angeles, California	Nicknamed "Little Nugget"	
	906201	1927	Pullman Company	Dining car	Southern California Railway Museum in Perris, California.		
	-	1956	Pullman-Standard	6-6-4 Sleeper	Southern California Railway Museum in Perris, California.	Named "National Scene"	

== Preserved freight cars ==
Photograph	Number	Build date	Builder	Type	Disposition and Location	Notes	References
	20305		Pullman-Standard	Reefer	Southern California Railway Museum in Perris, California.	PFE	
	28504		PRSS	Gondola	Southern California Railway Museum in Perris, California.		
	37022	1973	BSC	Open Hopper	Operational at the Illinois Railway Museum in Union, Illinois		
	43535	1937	Pullman-Standard	Reefer	Southern California Railway Museum in Perris, California.	PFE	
	56004	1928	Bettendorf	Flatcar	Southern California Railway Museum in Perris, California.		
	85727	1926	PC&M	Open Hopper	Southern California Railway Museum in Perris, California.		
	100000	1906	McKeen	Boxcar	On static display at the Illinois Railway Museum in Union, Illinois		
	183206	1936	Union Pacific	Boxcar	Southern California Railway Museum in Perris, California.		
	498376	1965	Union Pacific	Boxcar	Operable at the California State Railroad Museum in Sacramento, California		
	903658	-	-	Boxcar	Stored, Western Pacific Railroad Museum in Portola, California		
	907149	1939	Union Pacific	Boxcar	Illinois Railway Museum in Union, Illinois		
	913140	1951	GSC	Flatcar	National Museum of Transportation in St. Louis, Missouri		
	917138	1979	-	Boxcar	Stored, Western Pacific Railroad Museum in Portola, California		

== Preserved snowplows ==
Photograph	Number	Build date	Builder	Power	Disposition and Location	Notes	References
	900002	September 1949	Union Pacific	-	Western Pacific Railroad Museum in Portola, California		
	900015	1952	Union Pacific	-	Railroad Heritage Park in Laramie, Wyoming		
	900016	1951	Chicago, Rock Island and Pacific	-	Limon Heritage Museum in Limon, Colorado	Originally Chicago, Rock Island and Pacific Railroad 95580.	
	900051	November 1912	ALCO-Rogers	Steam	Mid-Continent Railway Museum, in North Freedom, Wisconsin	Built as Oregon Short Line Railroad 762	
	900061	November 1912	ALCO-Rogers	Steam	Utah State Railroad Museum in Ogden, Utah		
	900075	December 1949	Lima-Hamilton	Steam	Illinois Railway Museum in Union, Illinois		
	900076	December 1949	Lima-Hamilton	Steam	Hermiston, Oregon		
	900081	1966	UP's Omaha Shops	Diesel	National Museum of Transportation in St. Louis, Missouri		
	900083	February 1910	ALCO-Cooke	Electric	Hermiston, Oregon		
	90098	December 1917	ALCO-Cooke	Steam	Hanna, Wyoming		
	90099	December 1909	ALCO-Cooke	Steam	Forney Transportation Museum in Denver, Colorado		

== Preserved cabooses ==
Photography	Number	Build date	Class	Disposition and Location	Notes	References
	3786	1942	CA-3	Operational at the Illinois Railway Museum in Union, Illinois		
	24535	October 1967	CA-13-1	Static display at the City of Wasco, Oregon		
	24592	December 1967	CA-13-2	On static display at the Western Pacific Railroad Museum in Portola, California		
	24567	November 1967	CA-13-2	On static display at the RailGiants Train Museum, in Pomona, California.		
	25049	June 1942	CA-3	On static display at the Western Pacific Railroad Museum in Portola, California		
	25232	1952	-	On static display at the Railroad Heritage Park in Laramie, Wyoming		
	25256	June 1959	CA-5	On static display at the California State Railroad Museum in Sacramento, California		
	25283	August 1952	CA-5	On static display at the Western Pacific Railroad Museum in Portola, California		
	25599	December 1964	CA-8	On static display at the Western America Railroad Museum in Barstow, California		
	25670	July 1967	-	On static display at the Limon Heritage Museum in Limon, Colorado		
	25729	August 1975	CA-10	On static display at Milford, Utah		
	25732	September 1975	CA-10	On static display at the Western Pacific Railroad Museum in Portola, California		
	25740	September 1975	CA-10	Railroading Heritage of Midwest America in Silvis, Illinois		

== Formerly preserved, scrapped ==
Photograph	Number	Build date	Builder	Model	Last seen	Scrap date	Cause of scrapping	Notes	References
	928	July 1950	Electro-Motive Division (EMD)	E9A	Cheyenne, Wyoming	May 19, 2013	Negligence and vandalism		

== See also ==
- List of preserved Missouri Pacific Railroad rolling stock
