= Union Pacific 6916 =

Preserved diesel-electric locomotive

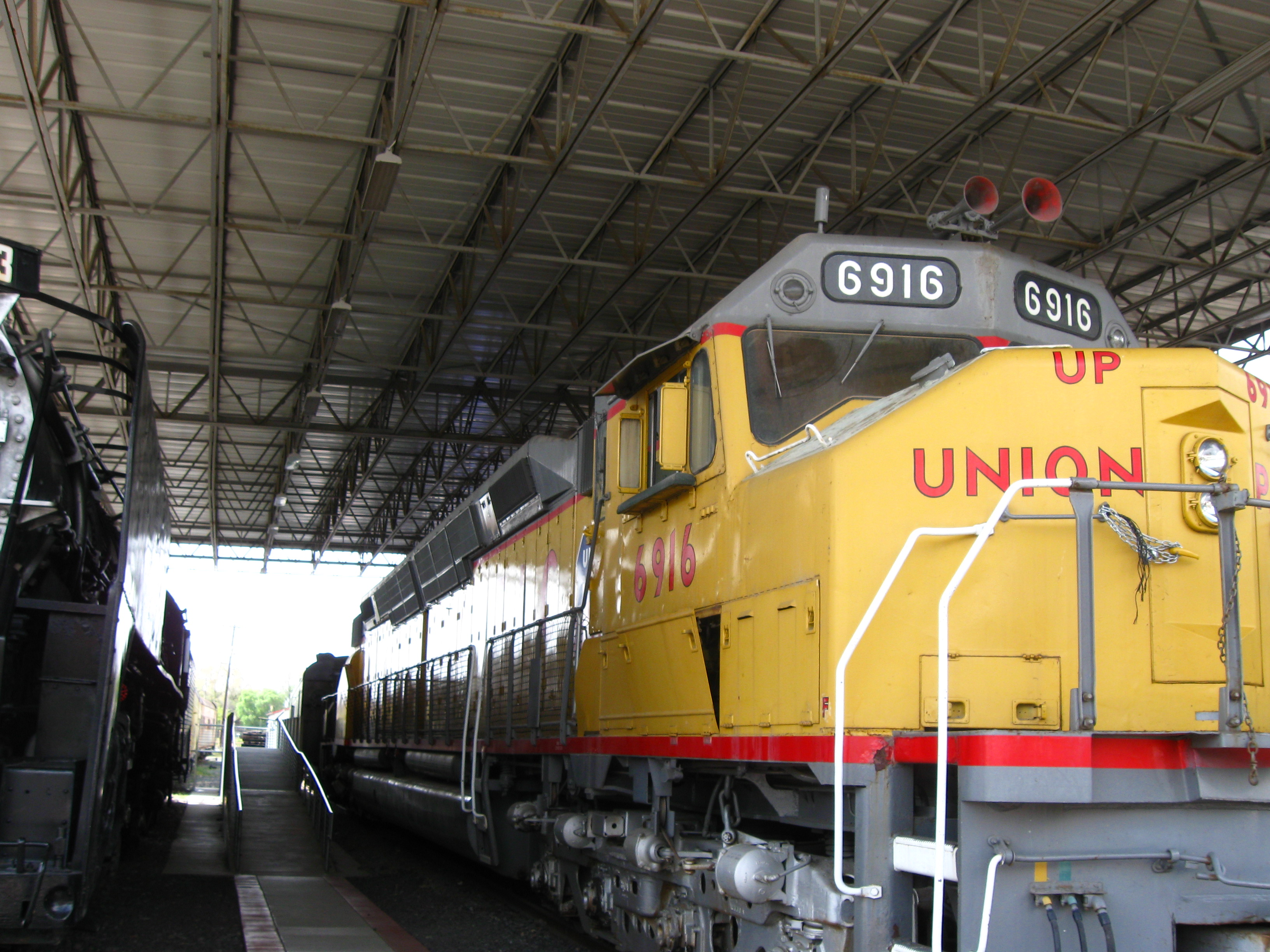
- Union Pacific 6916 on display at the Utah State Railroad Museum
Type and origin
- Power type: Diesel-electric
- Builder: EMD
- Model: DDA40X
Specifications
- Configuration
  - AAR: D-D
- Gauge: 4 ft 8 1/2 in (1,435 mm)
- Safety systems: Leslie S3LR
Career
- Operators: Union Pacific
- Numbers: 6916
- Nicknames: "Centennial"
- Disposition: Static display at the Utah State Railroad Museum, Ogden, Utah

Union Pacific 6916 is a DDA40X diesel locomotive built for the Union Pacific Railroad. It now resides in the Eccles Rail Center at the Utah State Railroad Museum in Ogden, Utah.

== History ==
Union Pacific 6916 is one of 47 DDA40X locomotives built. The DDA40X was nicknamed "Centennial" after the 100th anniversary of the driving of the Golden Spike in 1869, which signified the completion of the Transcontinental Railroad. They are unique in that they are actually two power units on a single 98-foot-long (30 m) frame, and are noted as being the largest diesel locomotives in the world. The locomotives weighed 542,432 lb (246,043 kg) and utilized two EMD 645E3A V-16 diesel engines, each rated at 3,300 hp (2,500 kW), for a combined rating of 6,600 hp (4,900 kW). Maximum speed was set at 80 mph (130 km/h).

UP 6916 was built by the Electro-Motive Division of General Motors in November 1969, as one of a series of 47 locomotives of the same type. By June 22, 1980, 6916 was placed in storage due to a decrease in traffic. It was returned to service soon after, but by 1983, most of the DDA40X types were stored out of service in Yermo, California. In 1984, a motive power crunch caused Union Pacific to reinstate 25 of the locomotives, including 6916. The locomotive was finally retired from service on May 16, 1985, and internally gutted as a parts source for SD40 and SD40-2 diesels. The unit was donated "as is" to the Utah State Railroad Museum in 1986.

As of 2024, Union Pacific 6916 remains on static display, being one of thirteen surviving Centennials.

== In popular culture ==
- UP 6916 was featured on the cover of the March 1985 issue of Pacific RailNews.
- The unit served as the prototype for an O-scale brass model released by Ajin and imported to the United States by Overland Models, in 1999.

== Gallery ==
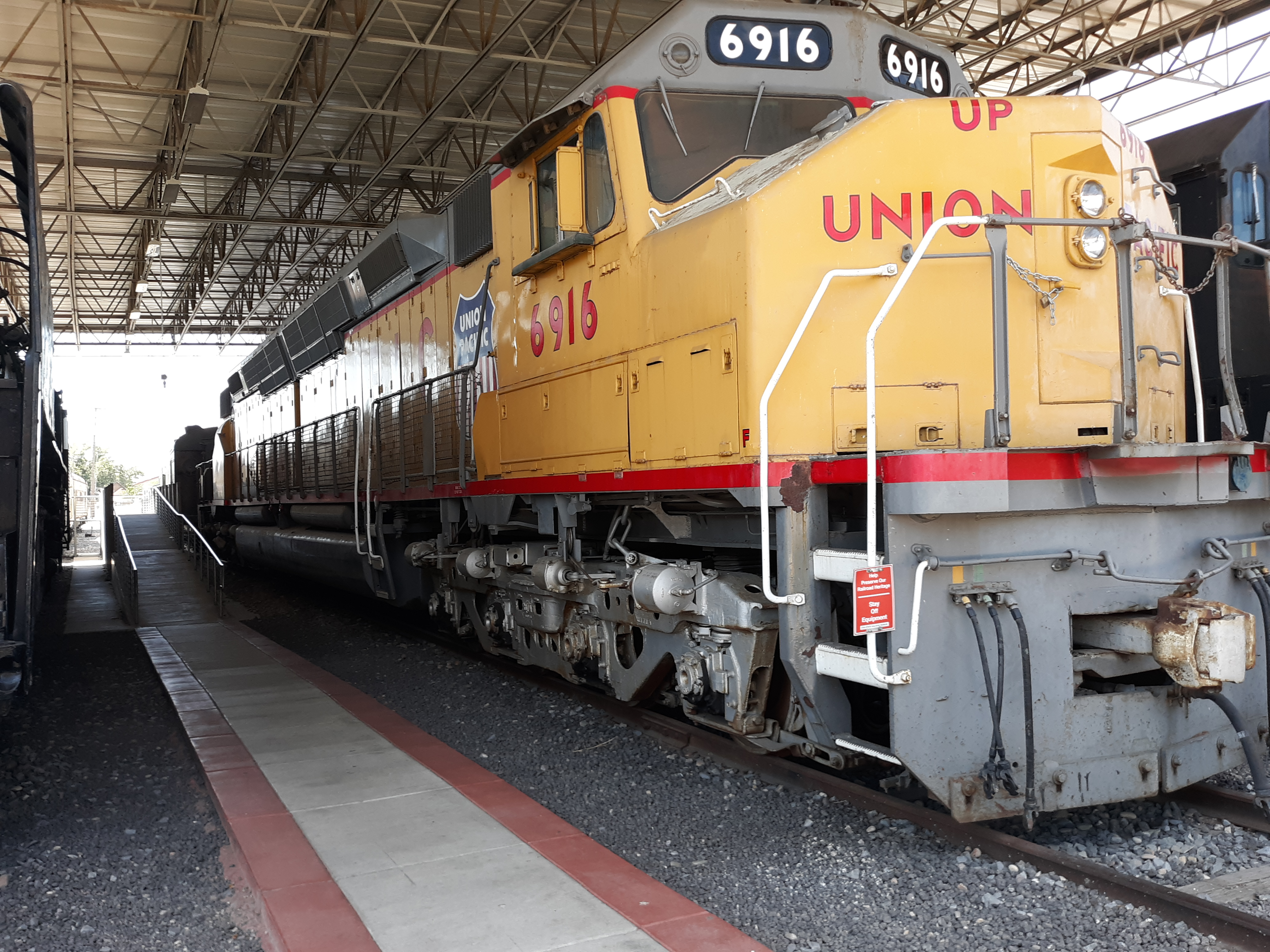
UP 6916 on display

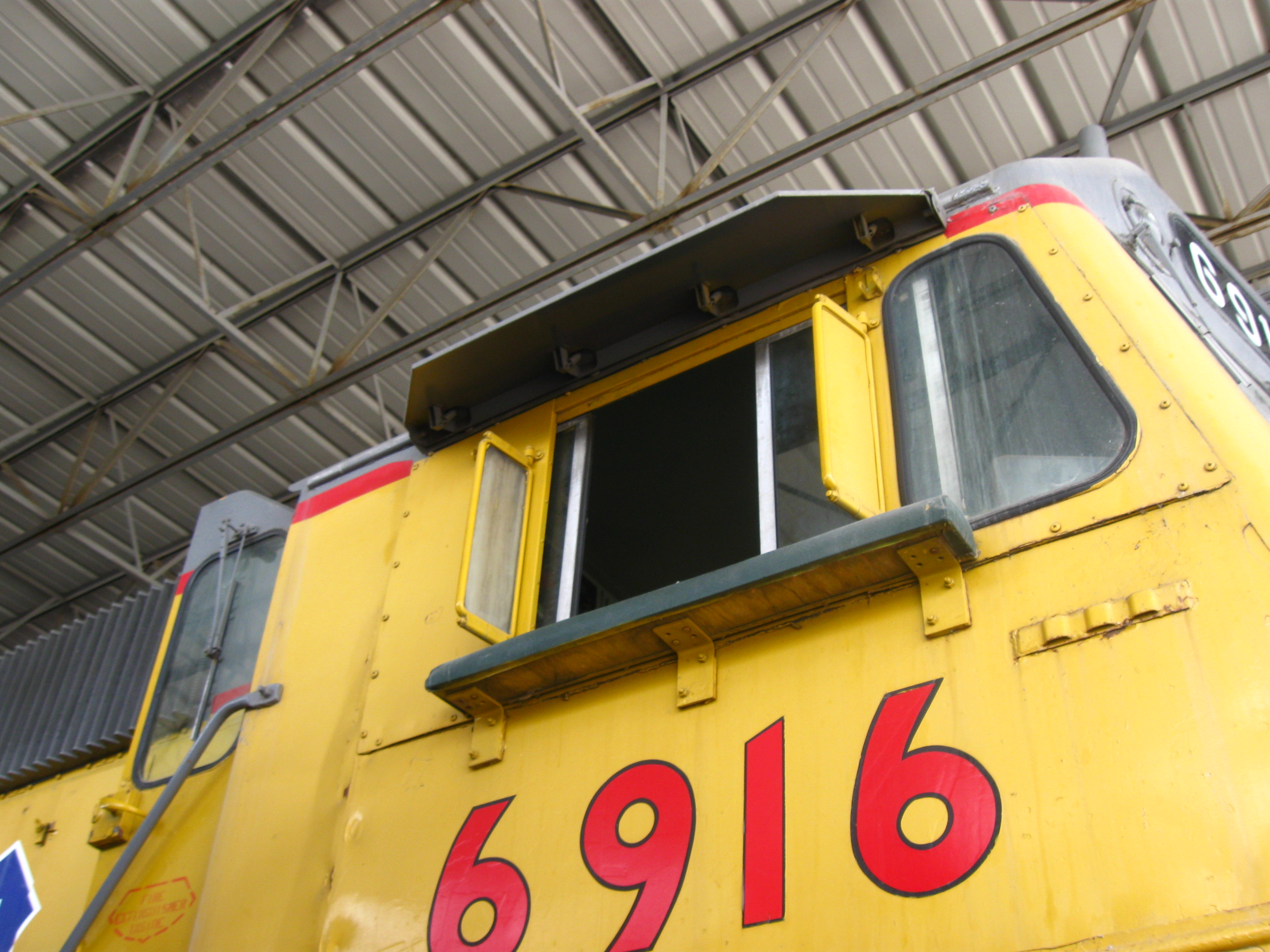
The cab of the 6916

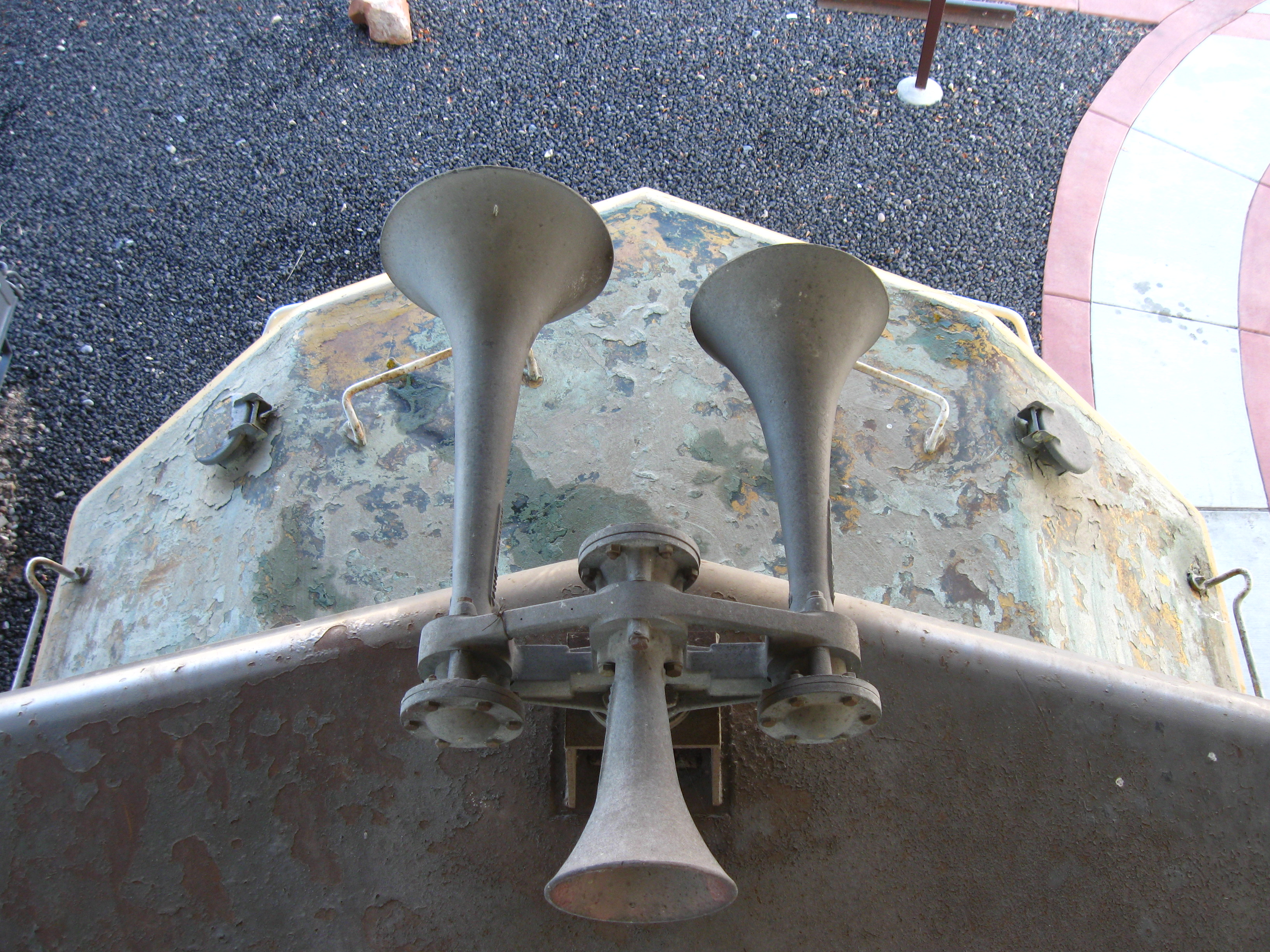
Leslie type S3LR 3-chime air horn

== See also ==
- Union Pacific 6936 - another surviving DDA40X
- List of preserved Union Pacific Railroad rolling stock
