= List of preserved Missouri Pacific Railroad rolling stock =

A large quantity of rolling stock formerly owned and operated by Missouri Pacific Railroad have been preserved in museums, on tourist railroads, and various other locations all across North America.

== Preserved steam locomotives ==
Image	Number	Build date	Builder	Class	Wheel arrangement (Whyte notation)	Disposition and location	Notes	Ref.
	124	1909	ALCO-Brooks	C-63	2-8-0	Owned by a private owner at St. Louis, Missouri	Front of locomotive preserved	
	635	1889	Baldwin	-	4-6-0	Display at the National Museum of Transportation in Kirkwood, Missouri	Built for the St. Louis, Iron Mountain and Southern. Acquired by the Missouri Pacific with the 1917 acquisition of the Iron Mountain.	
	2522	1898	Cooke	-	4-6-0	Display at the Paris-Logan County Coal Miners Memorial in Paris, Arkansas		

=== Preserved steam locomotive tenders ===
Image	Number	Build date	Builder	Class	Wheel arrangement (Whyte notation)	Disposition and location	Notes	Ref.
	1208	1911	ALCO-Schenectady	MK-63	2-8-2	On static display at the Mid-Continent Railway Museum in North Freedom, Wisconsin, behind OSL 762		

== Preserved diesel locomotives ==
Image	Number	Build date	Builder	Model	AAR wheel arrangement	Disposition and location	Notes	Ref.
	1973	June 1962	Electro-Motive Division (EMD)	GP18	B-B	Owned by the AAR Test track at Avondale, Colorado		
	3320	April 1980	Electro-Motive Division (EMD)	SD40-2	C-C	On static display at the Western America Railroad Museum in Barstow, California		
	4502	January 1955	American Locomotive Company (ALCO)	RS-3	B-B	Operational at the National Museum of Transportation in St. Louis County, Missouri		
	6027	June 1979	Electro-Motive Division (EMD)	SD40-2C	C-C	On static display at the RailGiants Train Museum in Pomona, California		

== Preserved freight cars ==
Image	Number	Build date	Builder	Car type	Disposition and location	Notes	Ref.
	27171			Gondola	On display at the Western Pacific Railroad Museum in Portola, California.		
	252476	1971	ACF	Boxcar	On display at the Temple Railroad & Heritage Museum in Temple, Texas.		
	265589	-	ACF	Boxcar	On display at the New Braunfels Railroad Museum in New Braunfels, Texas.		
	643595	June 1981	CNCF	Gondola	On display at the Western Pacific Railroad Museum in Portola, California.		

== Preserved passenger cars ==
Image	Number	Build date	Builder	Car type	Disposition and location	Notes	Ref.
	11	-	-	Business car	Operational at the Age of Steam Roundhouse in Sugarcreek, Ohio		
	501		Budd	Dining Car	Awaiting restoration at the Austin Steam Train Association in Cedar Park, Texas.		
	640		American Car and Foundry	Sleeper-Lounge	Out of service at the Austin Steam Train Association in Cedar Park, Texas.	Named "Eagle Cliff"	
	750	1940	American Car and Foundry	Observation car	Operational at the National Museum of Transportation in St. Louis County, Missouri		
	6210		Pullman	Coach	On display at the National Museum of Transportation in St. Louis County, Missouri		

== Preserved cranes ==
Image	Number	Build date	Builder	Car type	Disposition and location	Notes	Ref.
	X-250	1967	American Hoist and Derrick Company	Wrecker	On static display at the Utah State Railroad Museum in Ogden, Utah		

== Preserved cabooses ==
Image	Number	Build date	Builder	Disposition and location	Notes	Ref.
	1155	1940		On display at the National Museum of Transportation in St. Louis County, Missouri		
	11018	1937	Magor Car Corporation	On static display at Market Street, Bald Knob, Arkansas		
	13047	1981-1982	-	On static display at North Memphis, Tennessee		
	13057	1981-1982	-	On static display at the northeast corner of Washington and Broadway in West, Texas		
	13077	1981-1982	-	Owned by a private owner, Opelousas, Louisiana		
	13082	1981-1982	-	On static display at Wewoka, Oklahoma		
	13385		-	On static display at the New Braunfels Railroad Museum in New Braunfels, Texas.		
	13495	1950	-	On static display at the Great Plains Transportation Museum in Wichita, Kansas		
	13496	1950	-	Undergoing restoration at the Missouri and North Arkansas Railroad Depot Museum in St. Joe, Arkansas		
	13499	1950	-	On static display at New Roads, Louisiana		
	13504	1950	-	On static display at Earle, Arkansas		
	13506	1956	International Car Corporation	On static display at Independence, Missouri		
	13508	1956	International Car Corporation	On static display at Marshall, Missouri		
	13522	1971	International Car Corporation	On static display at History Park in San Jose, California		
	13523	1971	International Car Corporation	On static display at Alma, Arkansas		
	13540	1971	International Car Corporation	On static display at Wagoneer, Oklahoma		
	13546	1972	International Car Corporation	On display at the National Museum of Transportation in St. Louis County, Missouri		
	13558	1972	International Car Corporation	On static display at Aurora, Missouri		
	13562	1972	International Car Corporation	On static display at the Belton, Grandview and Kansas City Railroad in Belton, Missouri		
	13591	1972	International Car Corporation	On static display at the Children's Museum of Houston in Houston, Texas		
	13595	1972	International Car Corporation	On static display at the City of Conway Springs, Kansas		
	13597	1972	International Car Corporation	On static display at the City of Poplar Bluff, Missouri		
	13600	1972	International Car Corporation	On static display at the City of Russellville, Missouri		
	13602	1972	International Car Corporation	On static display at the Wolf House Historical Museum in Norfork, Arkansas		
	13607	1972	International Car Corporation	Owned by a private individual and stored at the Austin Steam Train Association in Cedar Park, Texas.		
	13612	1973	International Car Corporation	On static display at the City of Crystal City, Texas		
	13641	1973	International Car Corporation	On static display at the Cabot Public Schools in Cabot, Arkansas		
	13644	1973	International Car Corporation	On static display at the Lees Summit Chamber of Commerce in Lee's Summit, Missouri		
	13645	1973	International Car Corporation	On static display at the City of Concordia, Missouri		
	13649	1973	International Car Corporation	On static display at the Beecher Community Historical Society in Beecher, Illinois		
	13653	1973	International Car Corporation	On static display at the City of Dexter, Missouri		
	13664	1973	International Car Corporation	On static display at the City of Lonoke, Arkansas		
	13665	October 1976	International Car Corporation	On static display at WestArk Area Scout Council in Fort Smith, Arkansas		
	13674	October 1976	International Car Corporation	Owned by a private individual at Doniphan, Missouri		
	13675	October 1976	International Car Corporation	On static display at Market Street in Bald Knob, Arkansas		
	13679	October 1976	International Car Corporation	On static display at the Chamber of Commerce in Baird, Texas		
	13878	July 1980	International Car Corporation	Operational at the Western Pacific Railroad Museum in Portola, California		
	13889	1980		On display at the National Museum of Transportation in St. Louis County, Missouri		

== Formerly preserved, scrapped ==
=== Freight cars ===
Image	Number	Build date	Builder	Car type	Last seen	Scrap date	Notes	Ref.
	X-1064	-	-	Idler flat car	Mid-Continent Railway Museum in North Freedom, Wisconsin	July 2015		

=== Cranes ===
Image	Number	Build date	Builder	Type	Last seen	Scrap date	Notes	Ref.
	X-105	1914	Industrial Works	Wrecker	Mid-Continent Railway Museum in North Freedom, Wisconsin	July 2015		

== Bibliography ==
- Goneau, Ralph (2004). Tourist Trains 2004. Kalmbach Publishing Company. ISBN 978-0-87116-207-6.
