= Temple Railroad and Heritage Museum =

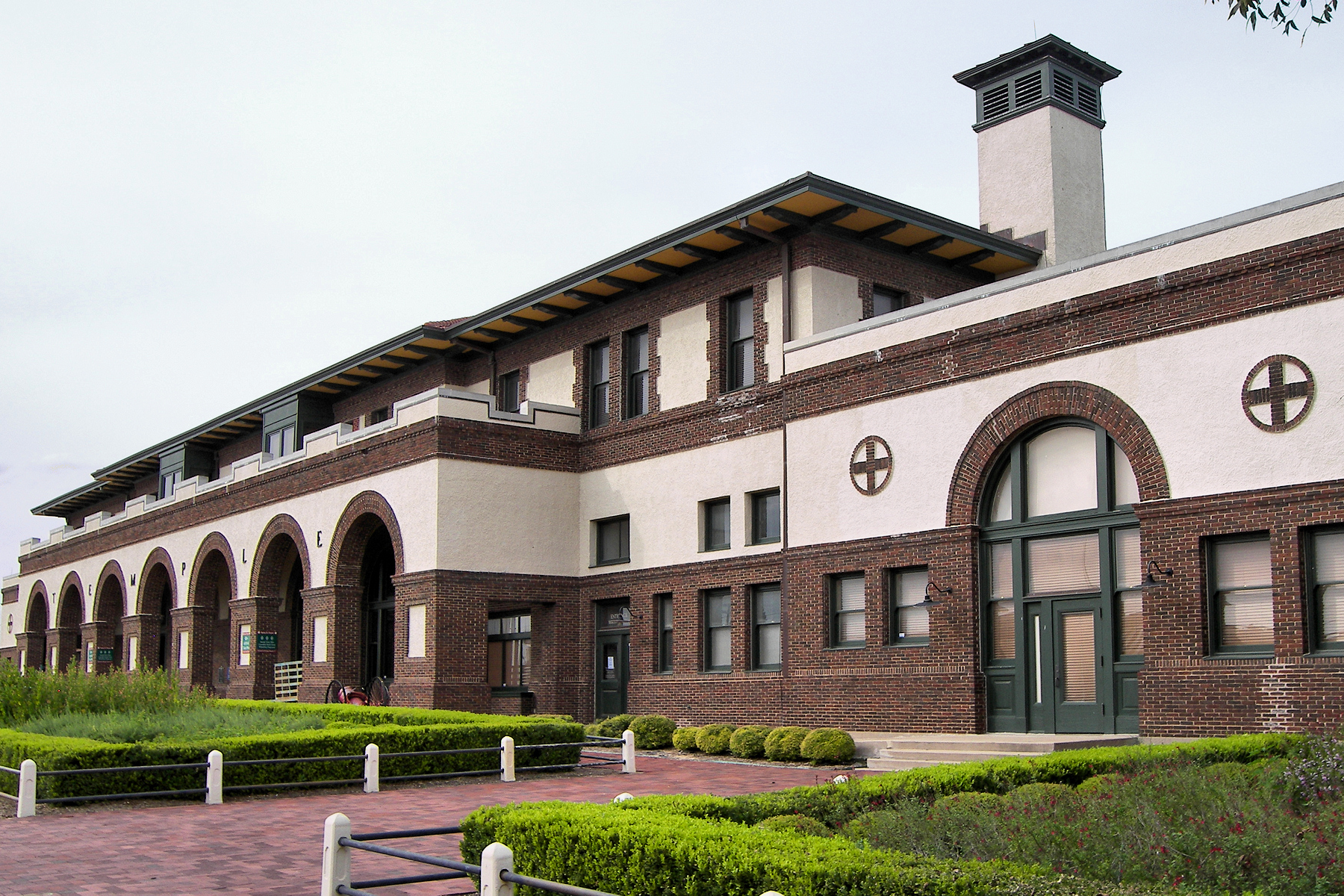
- Location: Temple, Texas
- Coordinates: 31.0957°N 97.3452°W
- Type: Railroad Museum
- Website: www.templeparks.com/facilities___rentals/temple_railroad___heritage_museum/index.php

The Temple Railroad and Heritage Museum is a railroad museum located in Temple, Texas.

The museum is housed in the 1911 Santa Fe depot, donated by the Atchison, Topeka, and Santa Fe Railroad in 1995.

== Collection ==
=== Steam locomotive ===
- ATSF Baldwin 4-6-2 "Pacific" #3423

=== Diesel locomotives ===
- ATSF #2301; ALCO HH600
- BNSF #1680; EMD GP9u

=== Rolling stock ===
- ATSF #1637 "Pine Mesa"; Budd 10-6 sleeper
- ATSF #999556; end-cupola caboose
- Missouri Pacific #1243; wide vision caboose (damaged by arson in 2015)
- Missouri Pacific #252476; 50' boxcar
- Missouri-Kansas-Texas #140; wide vision caboose
- Missouri-Kansas-Texas "Clover Glade"; Pullman heavyweight sleeper
- US Army #9826; Pullman troop sleeper
