= Union Pacific class MK-1 =

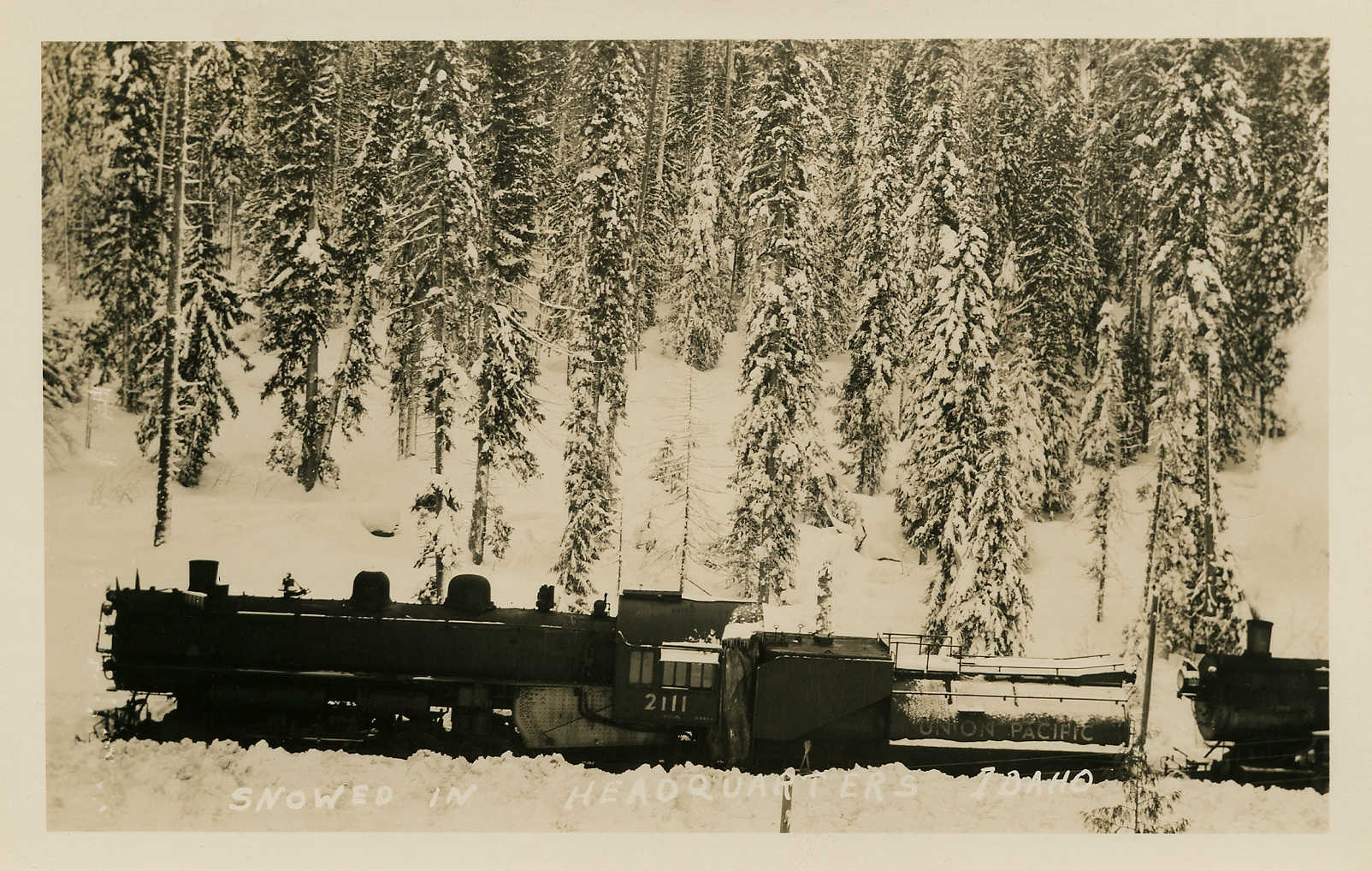
- 2111 in the snow in Idaho in the 1930s
Type and origin
- Power type: steam
- Builder: Baldwin Locomotive Works
- Build date: 1910-1911
- Total produced: 86
Specifications
- Configuration
  - Whyte: 2-8-2
- Gauge: 4 ft 8 1/2 in (1,435 mm)
- Leading dia.: 30½"
- Driver dia.: 57"
- Trailing dia.: 36"
- Wheelbase
  - Engine: 34 ft 8 in
  - Drivers: 16 ft
  - incl. tender: 64 ft 7 in
- Axle load
  - Leading: 24,100 lb
  - Trailing: 34,550 lb
- Adhesive weight: 204,450 lb
- Loco weight: 263,100 lb
- Tender type: Vanderbilt tender in later batches
- Fuel type: lignite
- Fuel capacity: 10 tons
- Water cap.: 9,000 US gallons
- Firebox
  - Grate area: 70 sq ft
- Boiler
  - Tube plates: 20 ft 6 in
  - Small tubes: 495× 2"
- Boiler pressure: 180 psi
- Heating surface
  - Firebox: 267 sq ft
  - Tubes: 5,292 sq ft
  - Total surface: 5,559 sq ft
- Cylinders: 2
- Cylinder size: 23¾" × 30"
- Valve gear: Walschaerts
Performance figures
- Tractive effort: 45,300 lbf
Career
- Class: UP: MK-1
- Numbers: 1900-1929, 2000-2014, 2100-2140
- Preserved: No. 2005
- Disposition: One preserved, remainder scrapped

The Union Pacific class MK-1 was a class of 2-8-2 'Mikado' type steam locomotives that were built by the Baldwin Locomotive Works originally for the Oregon Railroad and Navigation Company (OR&N), Oregon Short Line Railroad (OSL) and Union Pacific Railroad (UP) in 1910 and 1911.

== History ==
In 1910, the Oregon-Washington Railroad and Navigation Company (OWR&N) purchased a 2-8-2 'Mikado' locomotive from the Baldwin Locomotive Works and had this single locomotive numbered 440, this locomotive would be renumbered as 500 in 1911, and renumbered to 2100 in 1915.

In 1911, the OWR&N would order another 40 of these locomotives from Baldwin where they were originally numbered as 501–540, but renumbered as 2101–2140. The Oregon Short Line Railroad (OSL) would order 15 locomotives from Baldwin and numbered them as 1100–1114, but renumbering them to 2000–2014 in 1915. The Union Pacific Railroad (UP) would order 30 locomotives from Baldwin where they numbered them as 500–529, renumbering them to 1900–1929 in 1915

OSL No. 2000 was sold to the Spokane International Railroad (SI) in 1947.

== Design ==
The locomotives were designed from the outset to burn low-quality lignite coal as a fuel. In general they followed typical practice of the day for Baldwin designs and locomotives for Harriman's Associated Lines, but with some changes to the boiler and firebox. The boiler was cylindrical and the firebox was stayed with 400 radial rod stays, rather than girder crown stays. Given the poor quality of the fuel, a larger boiler was needed than usual for the power of the locomotive. The heating surface of 5,559 sq ft considerably exceeded that of the nearest comparable design, with 4,466. (Note: Virginian Railway Mikados) The grate bars were arranged as large cast grate sections spanning half the width of the firebox and arranged for rocking to clear ash. Airflow was provided by an unusually great number of narrow slots, to suit lignite. The brick arch was deeper than usual, again to suit lignite, and was supported by four arch tubes. The boiler, as built, was unsuperheated and had 495× 2" tubes.

At the time this was the largest Mikado built, although not quite the most powerful or with the most weight on its drivers.

=== Superheating ===
In 1912, the boiler was rebuilt to provide superheating. Half of the tubes were removed in favour of 36 larger flues containing superheater elements. Total heating area was reduced to 5,118 sq ft, although still large in its class.

=== Oil firing ===
Some were later converted to oil firing.

== Preservation ==
Only one member of the class is in preservation, No. 2005, which is on static display at Ross Park based in Pocatello, Idaho.

== Fleet numbers ==
=== Union Pacific ===
Extended content

Road number	Built date	Serial number	First run date	Retirement date	Disposal date	Notes
1900	1911	-	-	-	-	Scrapped
1901	1911	-	-	-	-	Scrapped
1902	1911	-	-	-	-	Scrapped
1903	1911	-	-	-	-	Scrapped
1904	1911	-	-	-	-	Scrapped
1905	1911	-	-	-	-	Scrapped
1906	1911	-	-	-	-	Scrapped
1907	1911	-	-	-	-	Scrapped
1908	1911	-	-	-	-	Scrapped
1909	1911	-	-	-	-	Scrapped
1910	1911	-	-	-	-	Scrapped
1911	1911	-	-	-	-	Scrapped
1912	1911	-	-	-	-	Scrapped
1913	1911	-	-	-	-	Scrapped
1914	1911	-	-	-	-	Scrapped
1915	1911	-	-	-	-	Scrapped
1916	1911	-	-	-	-	Scrapped
1917	1911	-	-	-	-	Scrapped
1918	1911	-	-	-	-	Scrapped
1919	1911	-	-	-	-	Scrapped
1920	1911	-	-	-	-	Scrapped
1921	1911	-	-	-	-	Scrapped
1922	1911	-	-	-	-	Scrapped
1923	1911	-	-	-	-	Scrapped
1924	1911	-	-	-	-	Scrapped
1925	1911	-	-	-	-	Scrapped
1926	1911	-	-	-	-	Scrapped
1927	1911	-	-	-	-	Scrapped
1928	1911	-	-	-	-	Scrapped
1929	1911	-	-	-	-	Scrapped
2000	April 1911	-	-	-	-	Sold to the Spokane International Railroad in 1947. Scrapped
2001	1911	-	-	-	-	Scrapped
2002	1911	-	-	-	-	Scrapped
2003	1911	-	-	-	1952	Scrapped
2004	1911	-	-	-	-	Scrapped
2005	April 1911	36367	-	1958	-	On static display at the Ross Park in Pocatello, Idaho.
2006	1911	-	-	-	-	Scrapped
2007	1911	-	-	-	-	Scrapped
2008	1911	-	-	-	-	Scrapped
2009	1911	-	-	-	-	Scrapped
2010	1911	-	-	-	-	Scrapped
2011	1911	-	-	-	-	Scrapped
2012	1911	-	-	-	-	Scrapped
2013	1911	-	-	-	-	Scrapped
2014	1911	-	-	-	-	Scrapped
2100	1910	-	-	-	1955	Scrapped
2101	1911	-	-	-	-	Scrapped
2102	1911	-	-	-	-	Scrapped
2103	1911	-	-	-	1951	Scrapped
2104	1911	-	-	-	-	Scrapped
2105	1911	-	-	-	-	Scrapped
2106	1911	-	-	-	-	Scrapped
2107	1911	-	-	-	-	Scrapped
2108	1911	-	-	-	-	Scrapped
2109	1911	-	-	-	-	Scrapped
2110	1911	-	-	-	-	Scrapped
2111	1911	-	-	-	-	Scrapped
2112	1911	-	-	-	-	Scrapped
2113	1911	-	-	-	-	Scrapped
2114	1911	-	-	-	-	Scrapped
2115	1911	-	-	-	-	Scrapped
2116	1911	-	-	-	-	Scrapped
2117	1911	-	-	-	-	Scrapped
2118	1911	-	-	-	-	Scrapped
2119	1911	-	-	-	-	Scrapped
2120	1911	-	-	-	-	Scrapped
2121	1911	-	-	-	-	Scrapped
2122	1911	-	-	-	-	Scrapped
2123	1911	-	-	-	-	Scrapped
2124	1911	-	-	-	-	Scrapped
2125	1911	-	-	-	-	Scrapped
2126	1911	-	-	-	-	Scrapped
2127	1911	-	-	-	-	Scrapped
2128	1911	-	-	-	-	Scrapped
2129	1911	-	-	-	-	Scrapped
2130	1911	-	-	-	-	Scrapped
2131	1911	-	-	-	-	Scrapped
2132	1911	-	-	-	-	Scrapped
2133	1911	-	-	-	-	Scrapped
2134	1911	-	-	-	-	Scrapped
2135	1911	-	-	-	-	Scrapped
2136	1911	-	-	-	-	Scrapped
2137	1911	-	-	-	-	Scrapped
2138	1911	-	-	-	-	Scrapped
2139	1911	-	-	-	-	Scrapped
2140	1911	-	-	-	-	Scrapped
