= Missouri Pacific Railroad =

Defunct American Class I railroad

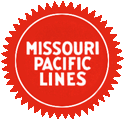

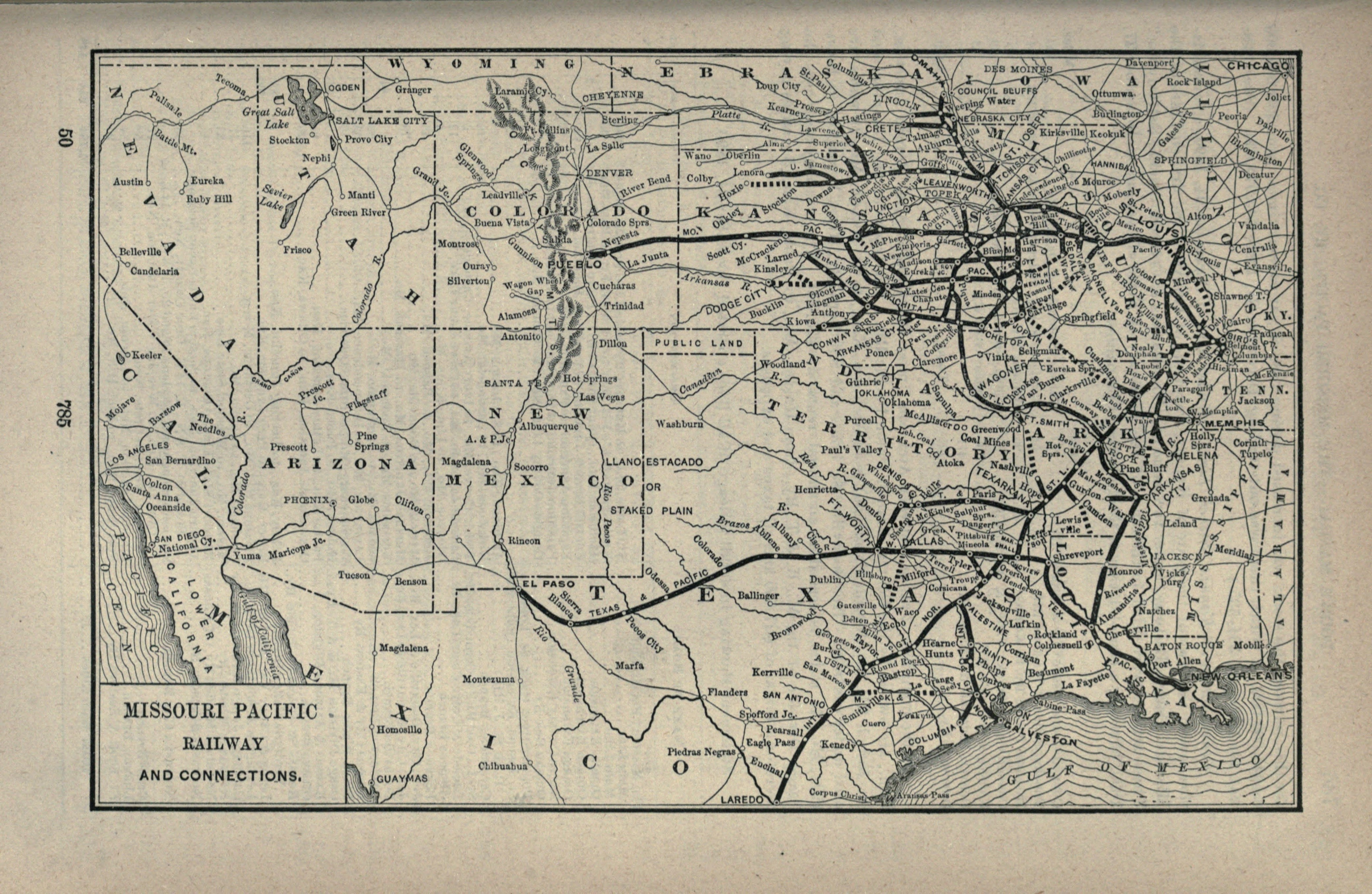
- MP system map, c. 1891

Overview
- Headquarters: St. Louis, Missouri
- Founders: Thomas Allen; Wayman Crow; John O'Fallon; Daniel D. Page
- Reporting mark: MP
- Locale: Arkansas, Colorado, Illinois, Kansas, Louisiana, Mississippi, Missouri, Nebraska, Oklahoma, and Texas
- Dates of operation: 1872–1997
- Predecessor: Pacific Railroad
- Successor: Union Pacific Railroad

Technical
- Track gauge: 4 ft 8 1/2 in (1,435 mm) standard gauge

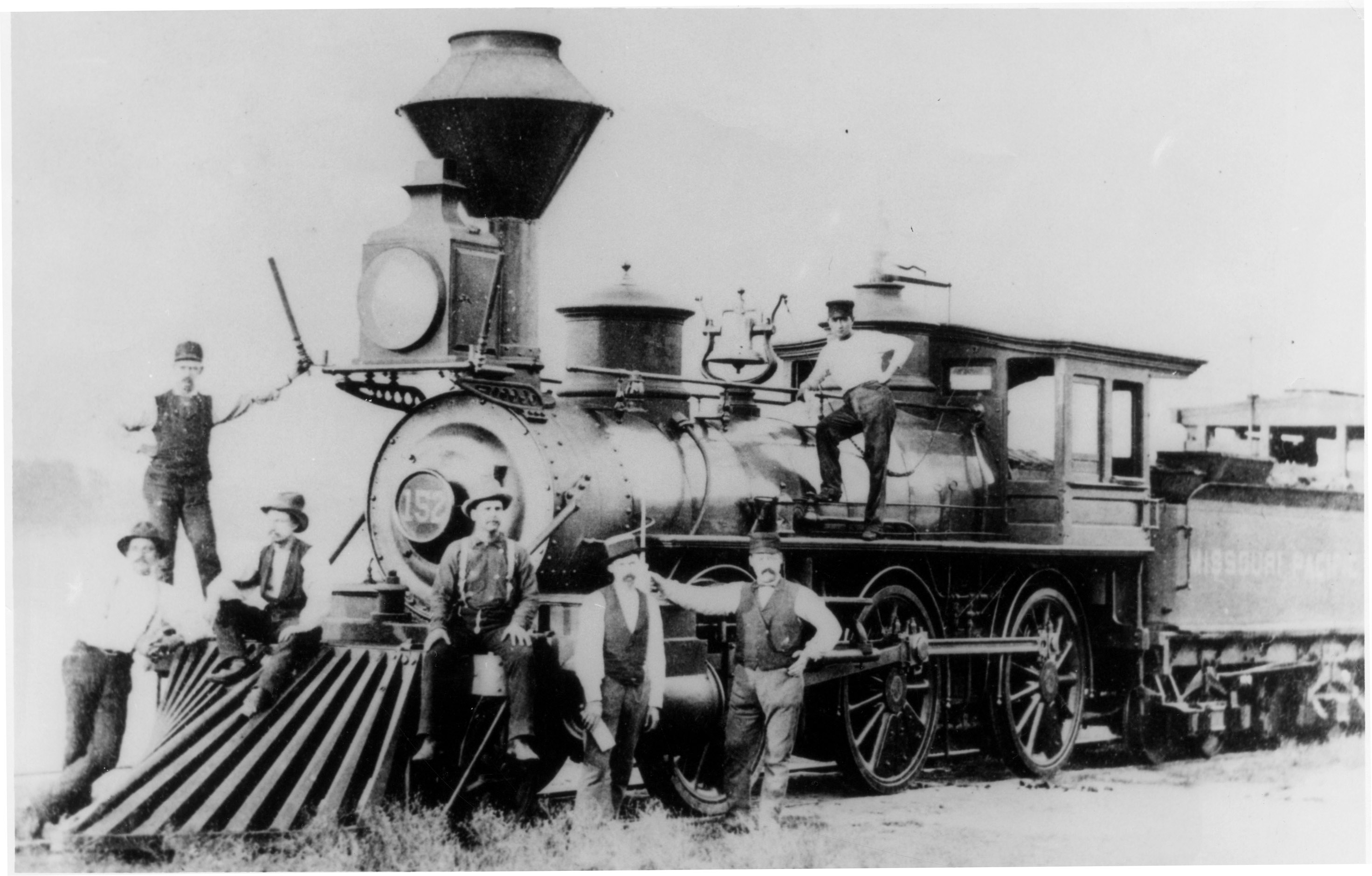
Missouri Pacific Locomotive #152

The Missouri Pacific Railroad (reporting mark MP), commonly abbreviated as MoPac, was one of the first railroads in the United States west of the Mississippi River. MoPac was a Class I railroad growing from dozens of predecessors and mergers. In 1967, the railroad operated 9,041 miles of road and 13,318 miles of track, not including DK&S, NO&LC, T&P, and its subsidiaries C&EI and Missouri-Illinois.

Union Pacific Corporation, the parent company of the Union Pacific Railroad, agreed to buy the Missouri Pacific Railroad on January 8, 1980. Lawsuits filed by competing railroads delayed approval of the merger until September 13, 1982. After the Supreme Court denied a trial to the Southern Pacific, the merger took effect on December 22, 1982. However, due to outstanding bonds of the Missouri Pacific, its full merger into the Union Pacific Railroad did not become official until January 1, 1997.

== History ==
On July 4, 1851, ground was broken at St. Louis on the Pacific Railroad, the predecessor of the Missouri Pacific Railroad. The first section of track was completed in 1852. Construction was interrupted by the American Civil War, but in 1865, it became the first railroad in Kansas City. In 1872, the Pacific Railroad was reorganized as the Missouri Pacific Railway by new investors after a railroad debt crisis. At one time, it advertised itself as "The First Railroad West of the Mississippi".

Other predecessors included the St. Louis, Iron Mountain and Southern Railway (SLIMS), Texas and Pacific Railway (TP), Chicago and Eastern Illinois Railroad (C&EI), St. Louis, Brownsville and Mexico Railway (SLBM), Kansas, Oklahoma and Gulf Railway (KO&G), Midland Valley Railroad (MV), San Antonio, Uvalde and Gulf Railroad (SAU&G), Gulf Coast Lines (GC), International-Great Northern Railroad (IGN), Kansas, Nebraska & Dakota Railroad, New Orleans, Texas and Mexico Railway (NOTM), Missouri-Illinois Railroad (MI), as well as the small Central Branch Railway (an early predecessor of MP in Kansas and south-central Nebraska), and joint ventures such as the Alton and Southern Railroad (AS).

Missouri Pacific was under the control of New York financier Jay Gould from 1879 until his death in 1892. Gould developed a system extending through Colorado, Nebraska, Arkansas, Texas, and Louisiana. His son George Gould inherited control upon his father's death, but lost control of the company after it declared bankruptcy in 1915. The line was merged with the St. Louis, Iron Mountain and Southern Railway (SLIMS) and reorganized as the Missouri Pacific Railroad in 1917. Missouri Pacific later acquired or gained a controlling interest in other lines in Texas, including the Gulf Coast Lines, International-Great Northern Railroad, and the Texas and Pacific Railway.

The railroad's first heavy repair shops were built in Sedalia, Missouri in 1872. In 1905 several smaller shop sites were consolidated at Sedalia when the old shops were closed and moved to a new site along Marshall Avenue. The MoPac began using SLIMS' Baring Cross Shops in North Little Rock, Arkansas, in 1882. A fire in 1900 caused them to be rebuilt on a larger scale that would ultimately become the primary MoPac shop site (now known as the Downing B. Jenks Shops). Minor locomotive repairs were carried out at the terminals in St. Louis and Kansas City.

MoPac declared bankruptcy again in 1933, during the Great Depression, and entered into trusteeship. The company was reorganized and the trusteeship ended in 1956.

By the 1980s, the system owned 11,469 miles (18,458 km) of rail line over 11 states bounded by Chicago to the east, Pueblo, Colorado, in the west, north to Omaha, south to the U.S.-Mexico border in Laredo, Texas, and southeast along the Gulf seaports of Louisiana and Texas. MoPac operated a fleet of more than 1,500 diesel locomotives, almost all purchased within the previous 10 years. Under the leadership of Downing B. Jenks, who became president and chief executive in 1961, the company became a pioneer in the early days of computer-guided rail technology. It was a major hauler of coal, grain, ore, autos, dry goods and shipping containers. At the time of its mega-merger in 1982, the MoPac owned more and newer locomotives and operated more track than partner Union Pacific Railroad.

On December 22, 1982, the Missouri Pacific was purchased by the Union Pacific Corporation and combined with the Western Pacific Railroad and Union Pacific Railroad to form one large railroad system. The corporation dubbed its rail subsidiary "Pacific Rail Systems", though all three railroads maintained their own corporate and commercial identity. The UP acquired the Missouri Kansas Texas and the Galveston, Houston & Henderson in 1988 and merged them into the Missouri Pacific on December 1, 1989.

By 1994, all motive power of the Missouri Pacific was repainted and on January 1, 1997, the Missouri Pacific was officially merged into the Union Pacific Railroad by the Union Pacific Corporation. UP continued to use the MoPac headquarters building at 210 N. 13th St. in downtown St. Louis for its customer service center until February 15, 2005. The former MoPac building has undergone rehab as apartments and is now known as Park Pacific.

Revenue Freight Ton-Miles (Millions)
	MP	Missouri-Illinois	C&EI	Doniphan Kensett & Searcy	New Orleans & Lower Coast	Asherton & Gulf	San Antonio Southern	Sugar Land Ry
1925	11,282	84	2,355	0.2	0.8	0.8	4	9
1933	7,457	44	1,066	0.1	1.4	(with MP)	(with MP)	(with MP)
1944	25,910	188	3,456	0.1	7			
1960	19,238	183	2,335	0.5	9			
1970	26,907	359	2,309	?	?			

In this table, "MP" includes New Orleans Texas & Mexico and all its subsidiary railroads (Beaumont Sour Lake & Western, I-GN, StLB&M, etc.) that officially merged into MP in 1956. Ton-miles for C&EI in 1970 presumably don't include the L&N portion.

By that same definition, MP operated 10,431 route-miles at the end of 1929, after A&G, SAS and Sugar Land had come under NOT&M; NO&LC operated 60 and DK&S (not subsidiary until 1931) operated 6. At the end of 1960, MP operated 9,362 route-miles, NO&LC and DK&S were the same, and M-I operated 172 miles.

Revenue Freight Traffic (Millions of Net Ton-Miles)
	T&P	KO&G/KO&G of TX	Midland Valley	Cisco & Northeastern	Pecos Valley Southern	Texas Short Line
1925	1,763	193	230	4	7	0.8
1933	1,498	163	84	(with T&P)	(with T&P)	(with T&P)
1944	4,761	412	113			
1960	4,168	495	97			
1970	5,854	150 (merged Apr 1970)	(merged 1967)			

"T&P" includes its subsidiary roads (A&S, D&PS, T-NM etc.); operated route-miles totaled 2,259 at the end of 1929 (after C≠, PVS and TSL had become subsidiaries) and 2,033 at the end of 1960.

== Passenger train service ==
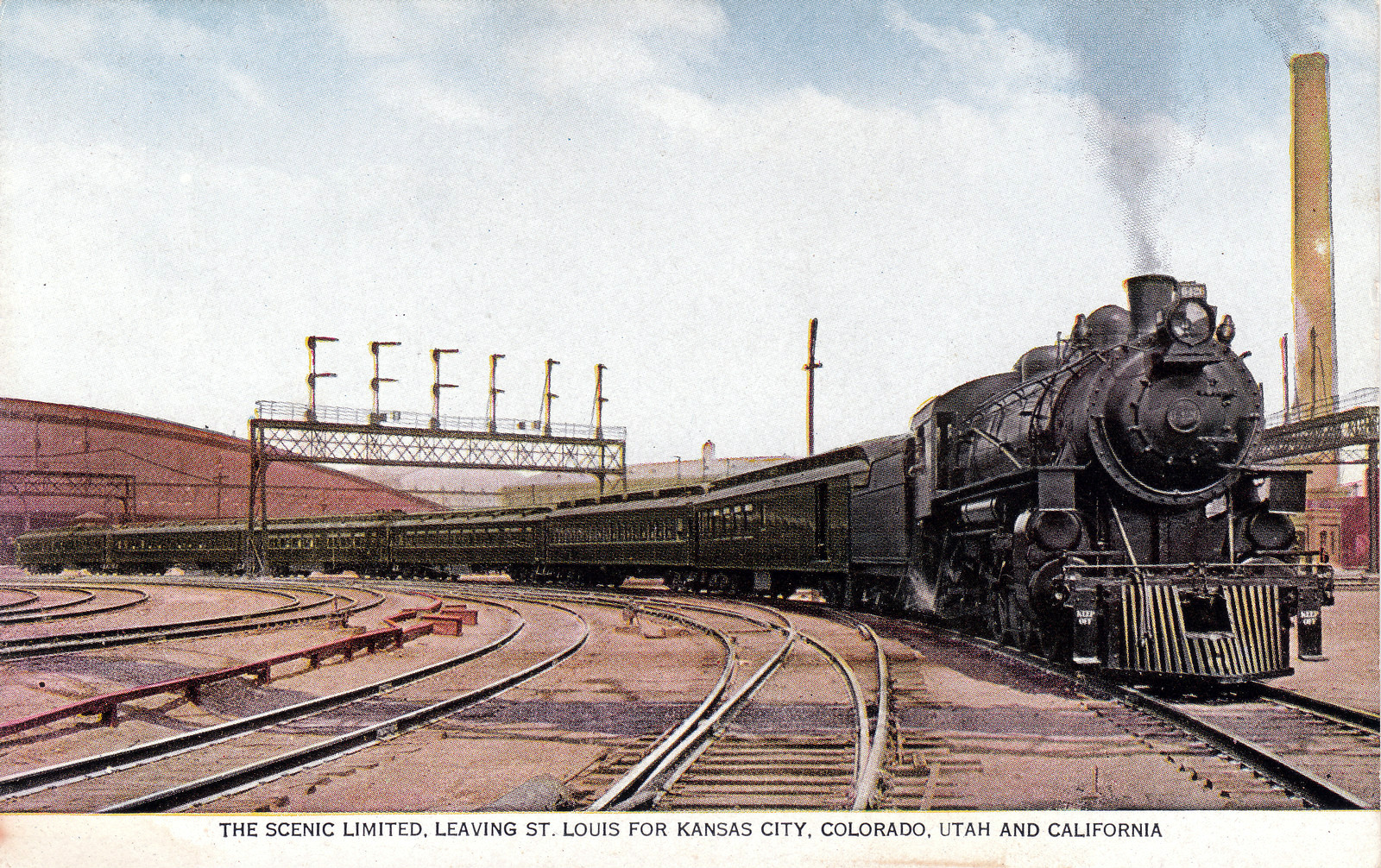
The Scenic Limited leaving St. Louis

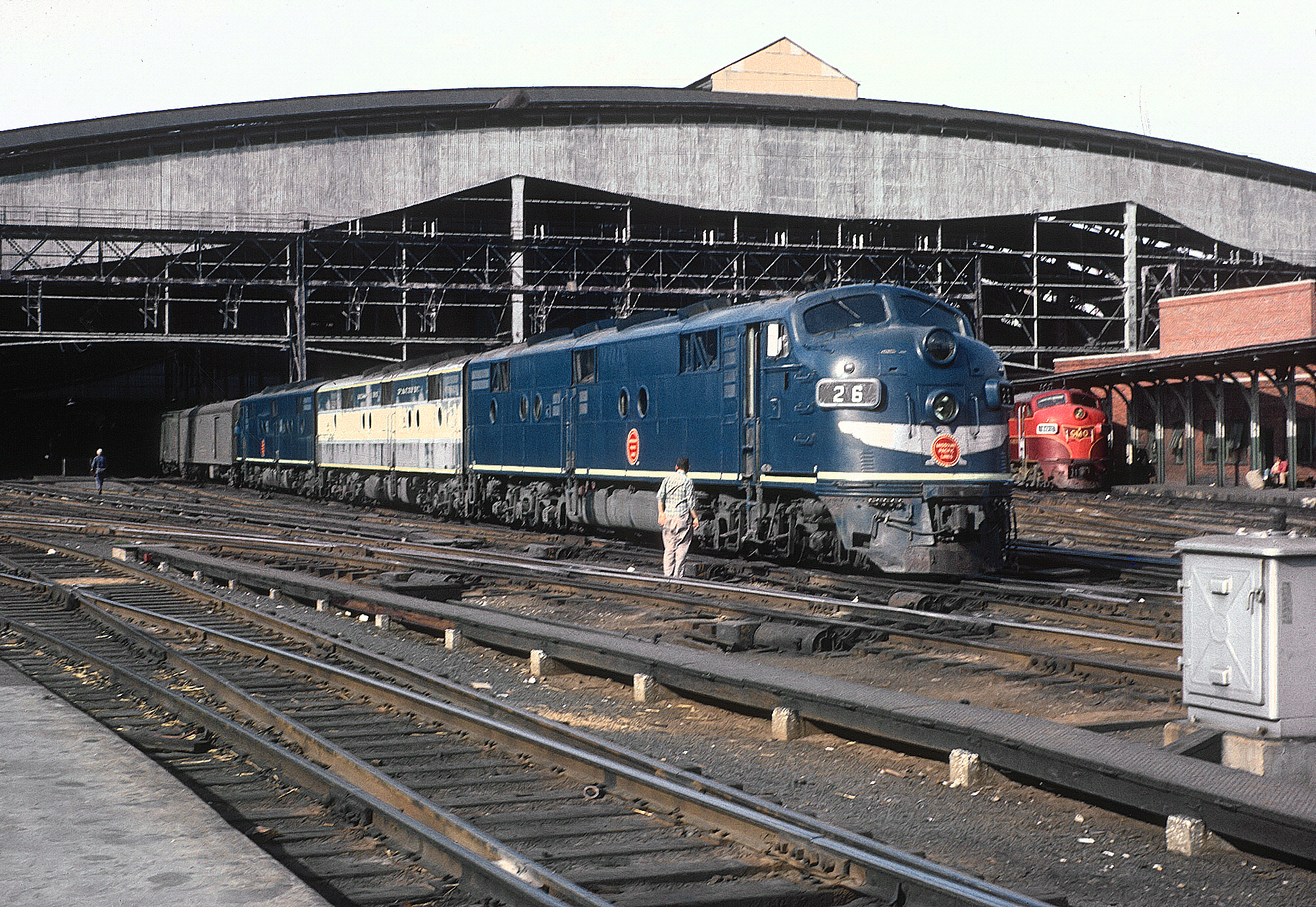
Missouri Pacific's Colorado Eagle, waiting to depart St. Louis's Union Station on April 17, 1963

In the early years of the 20th century, most Missouri Pacific and St. Louis, Iron Mountain and Southern passenger trains were designated by number only, with little emphasis on premier name trains. This changed in May, 1915, with the inauguration of the Scenic Limited between St. Louis, Kansas City, and San Francisco. Between Pueblo, Colorado and Salt Lake City, the Scenic Limited operated through the Royal Gorge over the tracks of the Denver and Rio Grande Railroad. From Salt Lake City to San Francisco, the Scenic Limited operated over the Western Pacific Railroad. A second premier train, the Sunshine Special began operating on December 5, 1915, between St. Louis and San Antonio via Little Rock and Austin. Another named train, the Rainbow Special, was placed in service in July 1921 between Kansas City and Little Rock. The Sunshine Special soon eclipsed the other trains in travel volume, becoming the signature train of the Missouri Pacific Railroad. An advertising slogan in 1933 proclaimed: "It's 70-degrees in the Sunshine when it's 100-degrees in the shade," referring to the fact that the Sunshine Special was one of the first air-conditioned trains in the southwest. When new streamlined trains were delivered, the Scenic Limited and Rainbow Special names faded, but the Sunshine Special had sufficient name recognition to co-exist along with the new streamliners into the late 1950s.

In the streamliner era, the Missouri Pacific's premier passenger trains were collectively known as the Eagles. A variety of Eagle trains were operated, with the first such train inaugurated in 1940. These routes included the Missouri River Eagle (St. Louis-Kansas City-Omaha), the Delta Eagle (Memphis, Tennessee-Tallulah, Louisiana), the Colorado Eagle (St. Louis-Pueblo-Denver), the Texas Eagle (St. Louis to Texas), and the Valley Eagle (Houston-Corpus Christi-Brownsville, Texas).

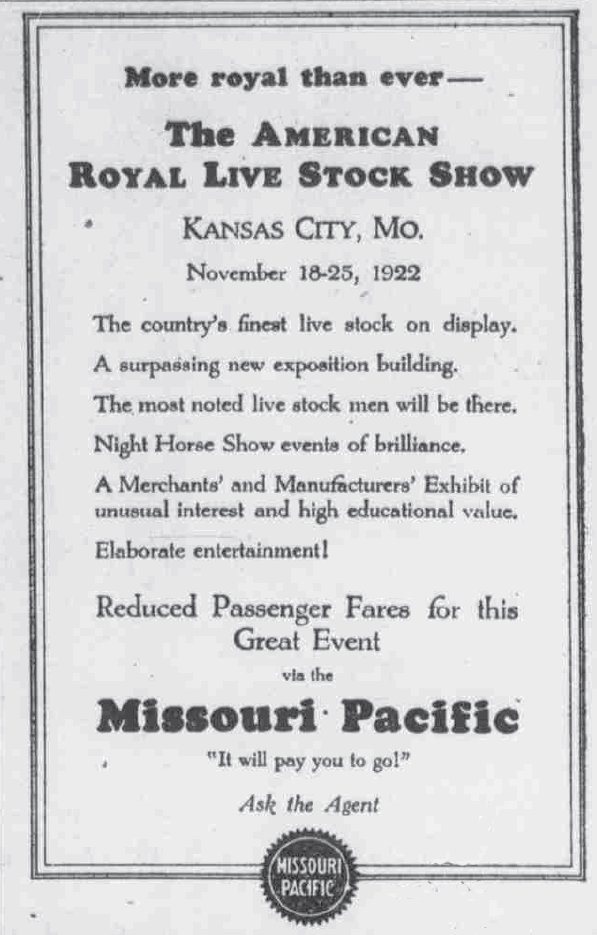
MoPac newspaper ad for travel to the American Royal livestock show, 1922.

Other notable MoPac trains operated included:

- the Houstonian (between New Orleans and Houston);
- Missourian (between St. Louis and Kansas City);
- Orleanean (between Houston and New Orleans);
- Ozarker (between St. Louis and Little Rock);
- Pioneer (between Houston and Brownsville);
- Southerner (service from Kansas City and St. Louis to New Orleans, via Little Rock);
- Southern Scenic (between Kansas City and Memphis);
- Sunflower (between St. Louis and Wichita); and
- the Texan (between St. Louis and Fort Worth).

Missouri Pacific aggressively discontinued passenger trains after the mid-1960s. When Amtrak assumed national passenger train operations on May 1, 1971, the only Missouri Pacific route that was part of its initial network was St. Louis–Kansas City, which is now served by the Missouri River Runner. On March 13, 1974, Amtrak restored passenger train service over segments of Missouri Pacific-Texas and Pacific's original Texas Eagle route between St. Louis, Little Rock, Dallas, Austin, San Antonio, and Laredo with the Inter-American. This train was renamed the Texas Eagle in 1981, resurrecting the name of the famous MoPac train. The Amtrak version runs over former MoPac and T&P trackage for much of its route.

== Preserved equipment ==
List of preserved Missouri Pacific Railroad rolling stock

== Honorary tribute ==
On July 30, 2005, UP unveiled a brand new EMD SD70ACe locomotive, Union Pacific 1982, with Missouri Pacific paint and logos, as part of a new heritage program.
