= Rock Island Snow Plow No. 95580 =

- U.S. National Register of Historic Places
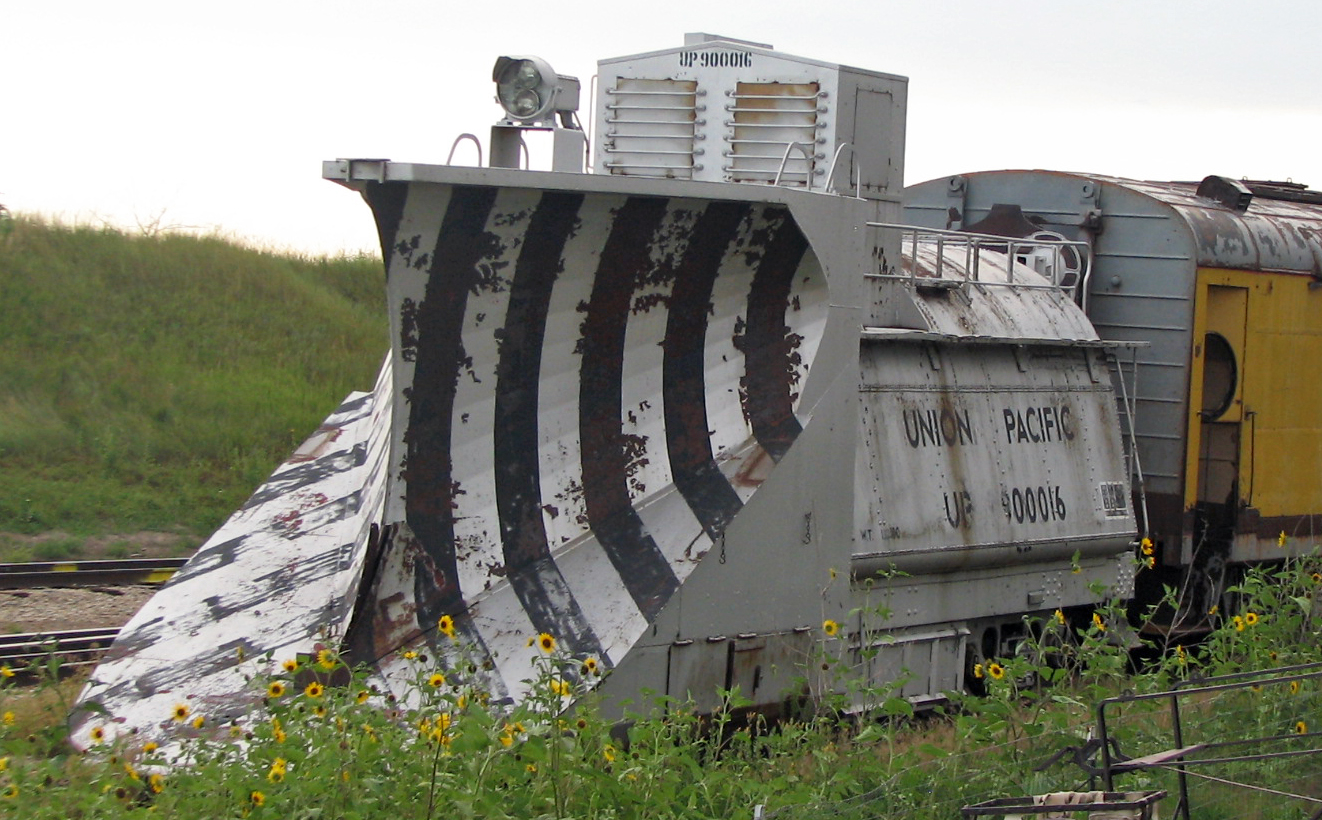

- Location within Colorado
- Location: 899 1st St., Limon, Colorado
- Coordinates: 39°15′39″N 103°41′12″W
- Built: 1951
- NRHP reference No.: 100002680
- Added to NRHP: July 23, 2018

The Rock Island Snow Plow No. 95580 in Limon, Colorado is a railway snowplow which was listed on the National Register of Historic Places in 2018.

It is termed a "Single-Track Wedge Plow". It was created as a snowplow by the Chicago, Rock Island and Pacific Railroad in 1951, rebuilding from a retired steam locomotive tender. It was transferred to the Union Pacific Railway in 1981 and assigned to serve from Oakley, Kansas.

In 2018 it is located at the Limon Heritage Museum, which is in the former Rock Island Depot, in Limon, Colorado.

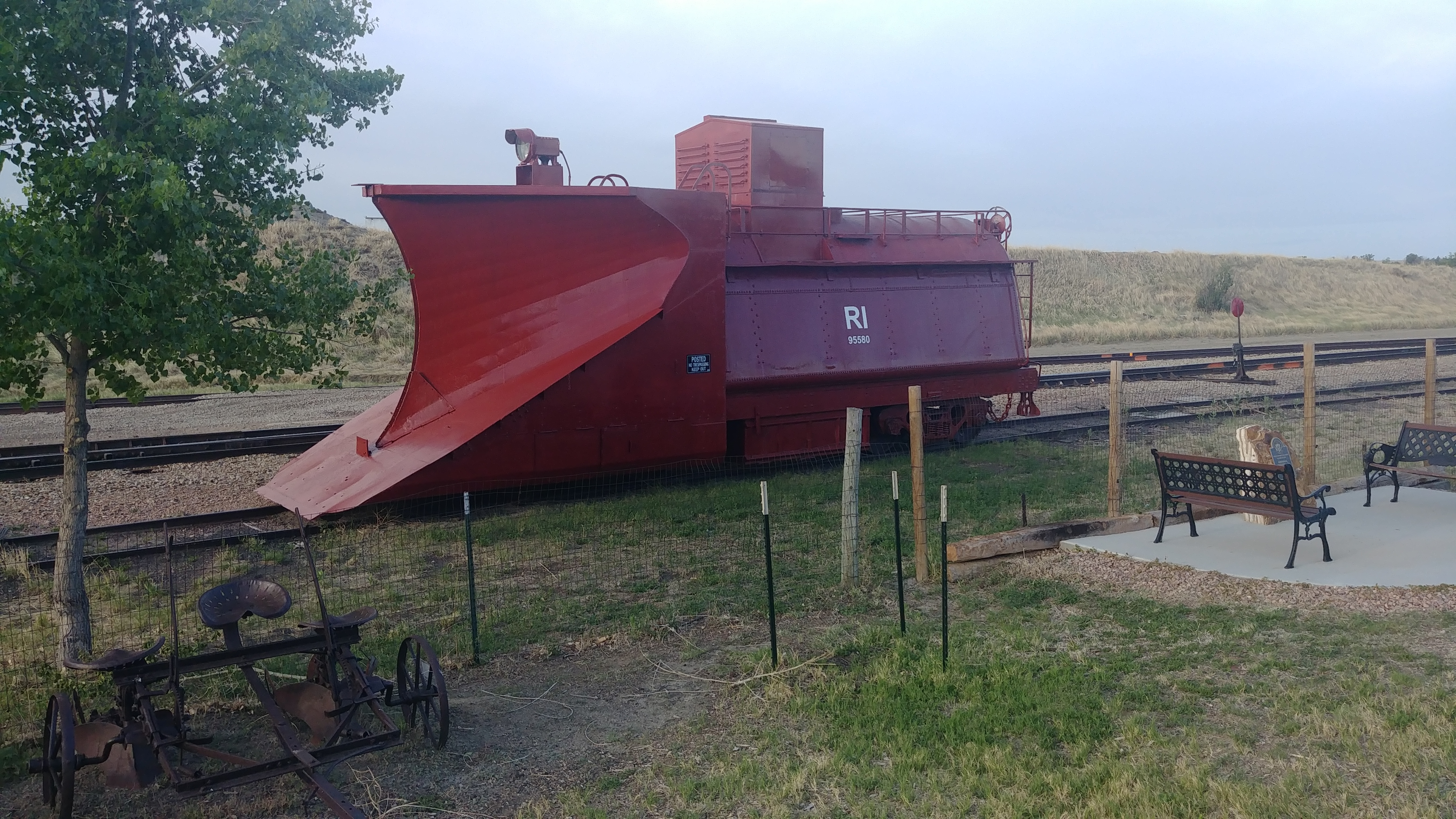
Snow plow 95580 in May of 2022, it has been restored to its Rock Island guise.
