= Limon station =

Railway station in Limon, Colorado, United States

Limon
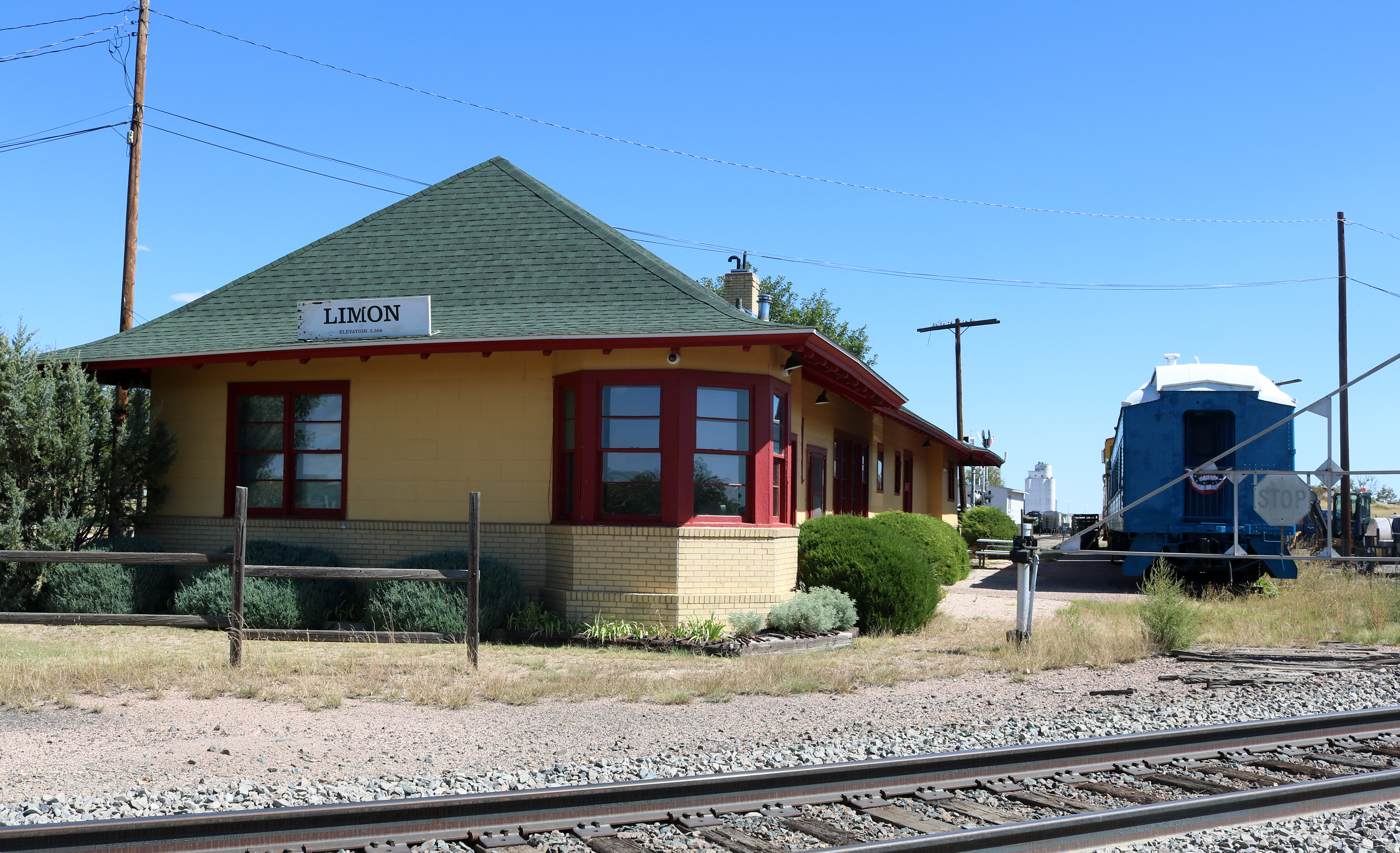
- The Depot in 2019.

General information
- Location: 897 First Street; Limon, Colorado
- Coordinates: 39°15′37″N 103°41′14″W
- System: Former Rock Island Line and Union Pacific station
- Owner: Limon Historical Society
- Tracks: 1

Construction
- Structure type: at-grade

History
- Opened: 1889
- Rebuilt: 1904, 1910

Services
Preceding station	Chicago, Rock Island and Pacific Railroad	Following station
Mattison toward Colorado Springs	Main Line	Bovina toward Chicago
Preceding station	Union Pacific Railroad	Following station
River Bend toward Denver	Kansas Pacific Railway	Hugo toward Kansas City
- Limon Railroad Depot
- U.S. National Register of Historic Places
- Location within Colorado Location within the United States
- Location: 897 First St., Limon, Colorado
- Coordinates: 39°15′37″N 103°41′14″W
- Area: Less than 1 acre (0.4 ha)
- Architect: Chicago, Rock Island & Pacific RR
- Architectural style: Late 19th And Early 20th Century American Movements
- MPS: Railroads in Colorado, 1858-1948 MPS
- NRHP reference No.: 03000038
- Added to NRHP: February 20, 2003
Location

Limon Railroad Depot (also known as Limon station) was a major Union Pacific and Chicago, Rock Island and Pacific Railroad station in Limon, Colorado. It has been on the National Register of Historic Places since 2003. It is included in what is now the Limon Heritage Museum and Railroad Park. It is one of seven still standing Rock Island Line stations in Colorado, and the only one restored.

== History ==
In 1870, the Kansas Pacific railroad, now Union Pacific, was the first railroad to pass where the town of Limon is today. The town was not incorporated (and didn't have a station) yet so trains passed by without stopping on their way to Denver.

In 1888, the Rock Island Line constructed a camp for workers building the main line to Colorado Springs. The track intersected the Union Pacific track where the depot is now. The town was named after the construction supervisor for the railroad, John Limon. The Chicago, Rock Island and Pacific (Rock Island Line) then decided that Denver would be a better western terminus for their trains. In 1889, the two railroads reached an agreement to allow "The Rock" to use Union Pacific's Limon Subdivision line on trackage rights. Before that, trains went to Colorado Springs and used Denver and Rio Grande Western Railroad track north to Denver. Limon became a major junction for the two railroads, since it was where trains such as the Rocky Mountain Rocket split to Denver or Colorado Springs, respectively.

In the 1980s, approximately 70 miles of former Rock Island and Cadillac and Lake City Railway track between Limon and Colorado Springs was removed. Evidence of the former right-of-way can still be easily seen along the route. In Colorado Springs, a 5.8 mile part of the right-of-way has been turned into a rail trail known as the Rock Island Trail. Northeast of Colorado Springs, the track closely followed U.S. Highway 24 and included a large trestle over Big Sandy Creek.

The building was damaged by the 1990 tornado that tore through Limon, destroying 50 to 75 percent of the business district. The first major event after the tornado was the Weekend Western Festival in June 1992.

== Service ==
=== Passenger ===
Limon was considered a union depot for the Union Pacific and Rock Island Line railways. It served many trains on the ex-Kansas Pacific Kansas City—Denver main line and Rock Island Line Omaha—Colorado Springs main line. It was the end of the "Limon Shuffle" where the popular Rocky Mountain Rocket train split into two trains.

=== Freight ===
Limon is at the western end of the Kyle Railroad, a regional railroad that operates on the former Rock Island Line to Nebraska. The railroad entered service in 1982. The line often interchanges cars with the Union Pacific. Union Pacific also runs about 12 trains a day on the Limon Subdivision, the ex-Kansas Pacific main line.

== Limon Heritage Museum and Railroad Park ==
The depot is now home to the Limon Heritage Museum and Railroad Park, a large historical museum. Railroad Park includes a Union Pacific caboose, a model railroad layout of the 1940s Limon Yard, and a 1914 dining car. It is the site of the annual Limon Railroad Days, which happens in June.

It also includes the Rock Island Snow Plow No. 95580, a single-track wedge plow, which was listed on the National Register of Historic Places in 2018.
