= Union Pacific Class S-6 =

Union Pacific S-6
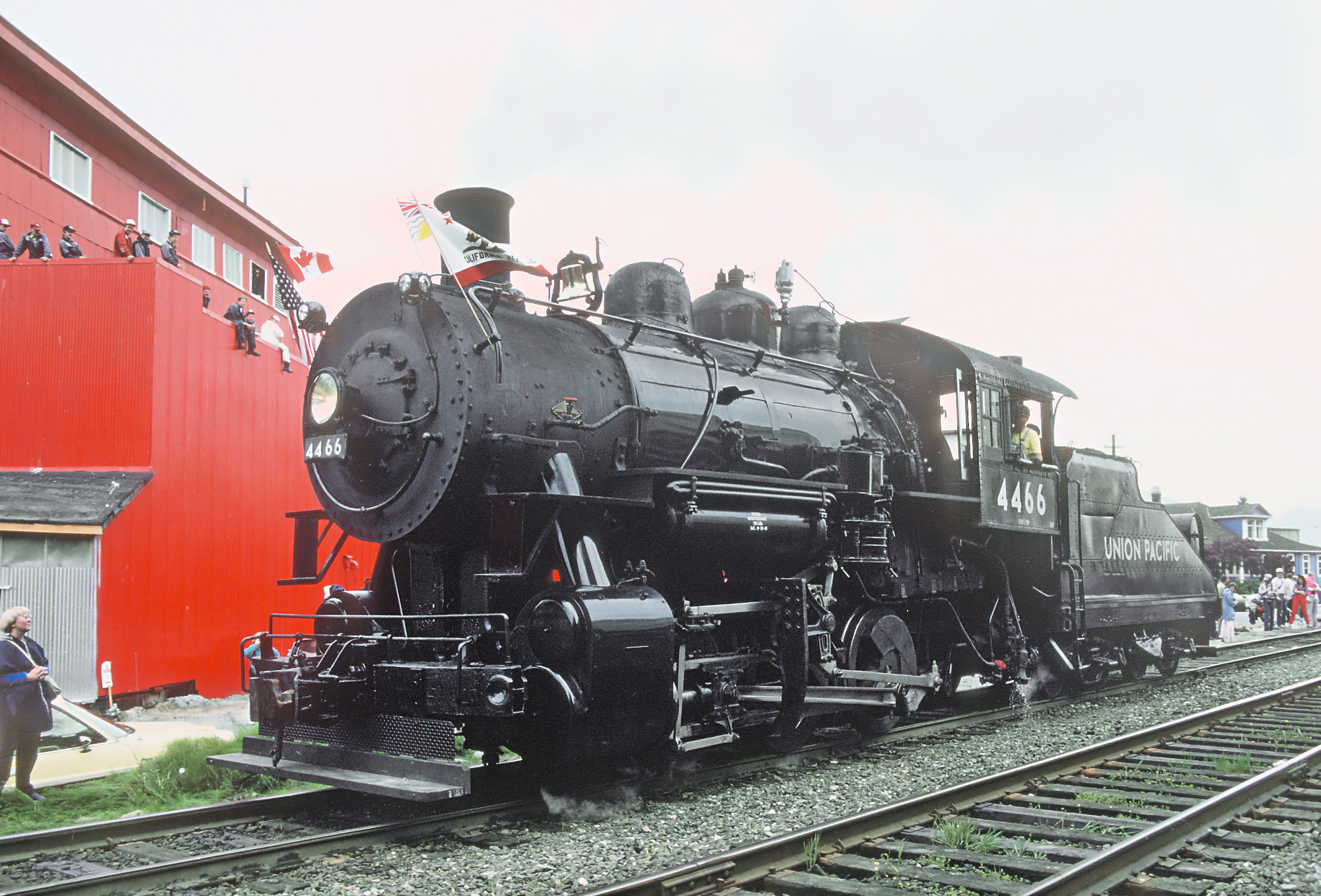
- Union Pacific 4466 at Expo 86
Type and origin
- Power type: Steam
- Builder: Lima Locomotive Works (LLW)
- Build date: 1920
- Total produced: 30
Specifications
- Gauge: 4 ft 8 1/2 in (1,435 mm) standard gauge
Career
- Operators: Union Pacific Railroad (UP)
- Class: S-6
- Numbers: LA&SL 4243-4246; UP 4451-4480
- Preserved: 4455, 4466
- Disposition: Two preserved, remainder scrapped

The Union Pacific Class S-6 was a class of 0-6-0 switcher type steam locomotives built by the Lima Locomotive Works (LLW) for the Union Pacific Railroad (UP).

== History ==
Between October and November 1920, the Lima Locomotive Works (LLW) had manufactured 30 locomotives for the Union Pacific Railroad (UP), the 30 locomotives were designed as switchers, performing switch work in the railroad's yards.

The class was retired by Union Pacific, with the first being taken out of service in 1947, and the last locomotive was removed from service in 1962.

- 4453 and 4455 were sold to the Monolith Portland Cement Company based in Laramie, Wyoming, with 4455 being sold in 1949, and 4453 being sold in 1955.
- 4457 was sold to St. Joseph Terminal Company based in St. Joseph, Missouri.
- 4464 was sold to Bunker Hill and Sullivan Mining and Concentrate Company based in Kellogg, Idaho.
- 4466 was assigned as the Cheyenne shop switcher until it was moved to Grand Island, Nebraska, prior to April 1960.

== Accidents and incidents ==
- UP 4476 had derailed and had wrecked itself on March 7, 1947, at Grand Island, Nebraska, it was retired in April 1947 and was scrapped.

== Fleet numbers ==
No.	Built date	Serial number	First run date	Retirement date	Disposal date	Notes
UP 4451	October 1920	5988	-	-	December 1953	
UP 4452	October 1920	5989	-	-	May 1947	
UP 4453	October 1920	5990	-	1968	October 1955	
UP 4454	October 1920	5991	-	-	November 1947	
UP 4455	October 1920	5992	-	1970	January 1949	On static display at the Colorado Railroad Museum in Golden, Colorado.
UP 4456	October 1920	5993	-	-	April 1954	Scrapped
UP 4457	October 1920	5994	-	-	March 1948	
UP 4458	October 1920	5995	-	-	March 1947	
UP 4459	October 1920	5996	-	-	June 1956	Scrapped
UP 4460	October 1920	5997	-	-	December 1953	
UP 4461	October 1920	5998	-	-	July 1956	
UP 4462	October 1920	5999	-	-	July 1956	
UP 4463	October 1920	6000	-	-	May 1947	
UP 4464	October 1920	6001	-	-	July 1954	
UP 4465	October 1920	6002	-	-	February 1947	
UP 4466	October 1920	6003	-	July 1962 (revenue service); 1999 (excursion service)	July 1962	On static display at the California State Railroad Museum in Sacramento, California.
UP 4467	October 1920	6004	-	-	March 1954	
UP 4468	October 1920	6005	-	-	March 1952	
UP 4469	October 1920	6006	-	-	May 1947	
UP 4470	October 1920	6007	-	-	July 1947	
UP 4471	October 1920	6008	-	-	July 1956	Scrapped
UP 4472	October 1920	6009	-	-	November 1947	
UP 4473	October 1920	6010	-	-	April 1947	
UP 4474	October 1920	6011	-	-	March 1957	
UP 4475	October 1920	6012	-	-	July 1956	
UP 4476	October 1920	6013	-	April 1947	April 1947	Wrecked on March 7, 1947, at Grand Island, Nebraska.
UP 4477	October 1920	6014	-	-	July 1956	
UP 4478	October 1920	6015	-	-	March 1954	
UP 4479	October 1920	6016	-	-	March 1954	
UP 4480	November 1920	6017	-	-	February 1954	

== Preservation ==
Two locomotives were preserved:

- UP 4455 - On static display at the Colorado Railroad Museum in Golden, Colorado.
- UP 4466 - On static display at the California State Railroad Museum in Sacramento, California.

== Bibliography ==
- Gore, Verne (2021-03-11). Midnight Magic at the Railroad Museum. Christian Faith Publishing, Inc. ISBN 978-1-0980-4806-8.
- Ostresh, Lawrence; Hansen, Jerry (2014-04-28). Laramie Railroads. Arcadia Publishing. ISBN 978-1-4396-4281-8.
