= Union Pacific 4466 =

Preserved American 0-6-0 locomotive

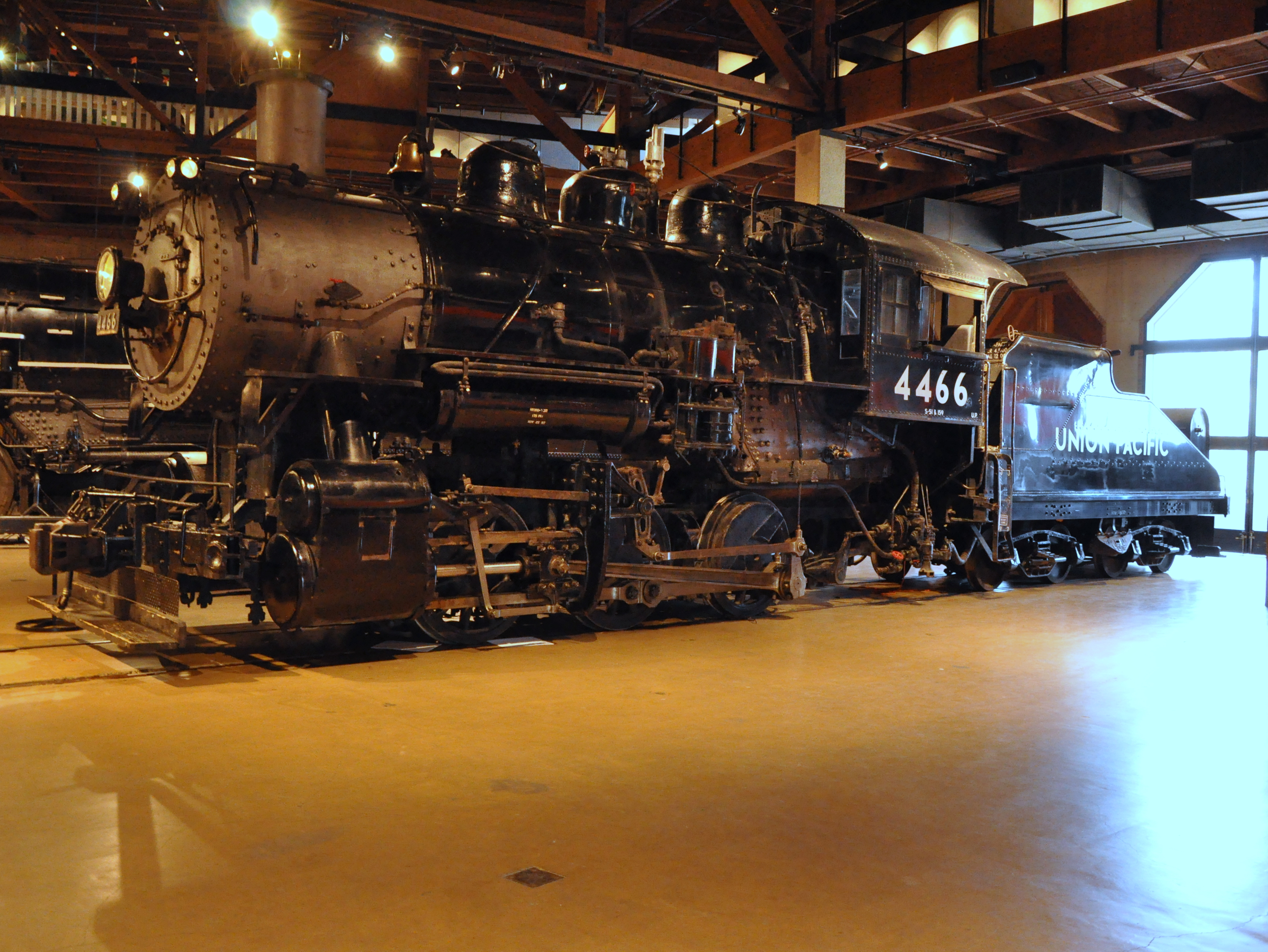
- UP No. 4466 on static display at the California State Railroad Museum
Type and origin
- Power type: Steam
- Builder: Lima Locomotive Works
- Serial number: 6003
- Build date: October 1920
Specifications
- Configuration
  - Whyte: 0-6-0
- Gauge: 4 ft 8 1/2 in (1,435 mm)
- Driver dia.: 51 in (1,295 mm)
- Adhesive weight: 159,000 lb (72,000 kg)
- Loco weight: 159,000 lb (72,000 kg)
- Fuel type: Coal
- Boiler pressure: 180 psi (1,200 kPa)
- Cylinders: Two, outside
- Cylinder size: 21 in (530 mm) dia × 26 in (660 mm) stroke
- Valve gear: Walschaerts
- Loco brake: Air
- Train brakes: Air
- Couplers: Knuckle
Performance figures
- Tractive effort: 34,400 lbf (153,000 N), 78,000 lbf (350,000 N) with booster
Career
- Operators: Union Pacific Railroad; California State Railroad Museum
- Class: S-6
- Numbers: UP 4466
- Retired: 1958 (revenue service); 1999 (excursion service)
- Restored: 1984
- Current owner: California State Railroad Museum
- Disposition: On static display

Union Pacific 4466 is an S-6 class 0-6-0 "Switcher" type steam locomotive, built in 1920 by the Lima Locomotive Works (LLW) for the Union Pacific Railroad (UP) for switching and transfer runs.

== History ==
No. 4466 was built in October 1920 by the Lima Locomotive Works (LLW) for the Union Pacific Railroad (UP), it spent most of its career in Cheyenne, Wyoming, as a shop switcher and was the UP Cheyenne Shop's last steam shop switcher. After Cheyenne, No. 4466 was transferred to Grand Island, Nebraska in 1960. The locomotive was retired from revenue service in 1958. It continued to remain in storage at Grand Island until March 1973 when it was donated to the Railway and Locomotive Historical Society.

In June 1978, No. 4466 was donated to the California State Railroad Museum. In 1984, it was restored to operating service and pulled excursion trains for the museum. In 1986, 4466 ventured to Vancouver, British Columbia, to be part of Steam Expo 86. The engine and tender were loaded onto flatcars in Sacramento, and headed to Vancouver, via rail on a Union Pacific freight train. Once it arrived in Vancouver, the locomotive and tender were unloaded onto the tracks and fired up for a safety test before it could operate in Canada. At the conclusion of Expo 86, engine and tender were again loaded onto flatcars and moved back to the CSRM via Union Pacific. This was not the only time No. 4466 took part in such a celebration, as it later went to Sacramento (its current home) for Railfair 1991; the engine would make its final runs for Railfair 1999 before its FRA ticket expired, after the event, the engine was retired from service for a second time and placed on permanent static display at CSRM.
