= Union Pacific 4023 =

Preserved American 4-8-8-4 locomotive (UP class 4884-2)

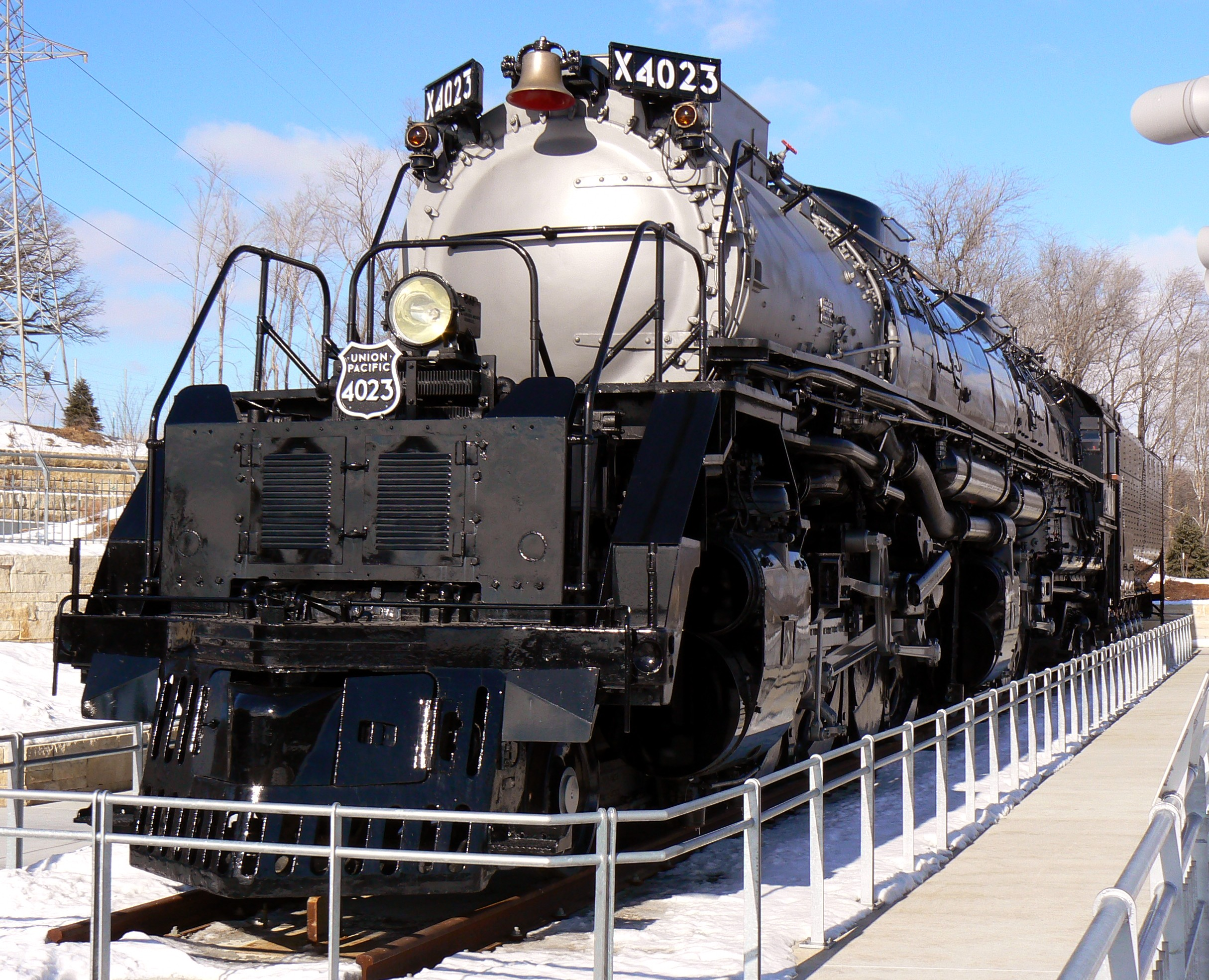
- No. 4023 in its current display site in 2007
Type and origin
- Power type: Steam
- Builder: American Locomotive Company (Schenectady Works)
- Serial number: 72780
- Build date: November 1944
- Rebuild date: 1957
Specifications
- Configuration
  - Whyte: 4-8-8-4
  - UIC: (2′D)D2′ h4
- Gauge: 4 ft 8 1/2 in (1,435 mm) standard gauge
- Leading dia.: 36 in (914 mm)
- Driver dia.: 68 in (1,727 mm)
- Trailing dia.: 42 in (1,067 mm)
- Wheelbase: Locomotive: 72 ft 5 1/2 in (22.09 m); Overall: 117 ft 7 in (35.84 m)
- Length: Locomotive: 85 ft 3.4 in (25.99 m); Overall: 132 ft 9 1/4 in (40.47 m)
- Width: 11 ft (3.4 m)
- Height: 16 ft 2 1/2 in (4.94 m)
- Adhesive weight: 545,200 lb (247,000 kg)
- Loco weight: 772,250 lb (350,300 kg)
- Tender weight: 436,500 lb (197,990 kg)
- Total weight: 1,208,750 lb (548,300 kg)
- Fuel type: Coal
- Fuel capacity: 28 short tons (25.4 t; 25.0 long tons)
- Water cap.: 25,000 US gal (95,000 L; 21,000 imp gal)
- Firebox
  - Grate area: 150 sq ft (14 m^{2})
- Boiler: 95 in (2,400 mm)
- Boiler pressure: 300 lbf/in^{2} (2.1 MPa)
- Heating surface
  - Firebox: 720 sq ft (67 m^{2})
  - Tubes and flues: 5,035 sq ft (468 m^{2})
  - Total surface: 5,735 sq ft (533 m^{2})
- Superheater
  - Type: Type A
  - Heating area: 2,043 sq ft (190 m^{2})
- Cylinders: Four
- Cylinder size: 23.75 in × 32 in (603 mm × 813 mm)
- Valve gear: Walschaerts
- Valve type: Piston valves
- Loco brake: Air
- Train brakes: Air
- Couplers: Knuckle
Performance figures
- Maximum speed: 80 mph (130 km/h)
- Power output: 7,000 hp (5,200 kW) @ Cylinder
- Tractive effort: 135,375 lbf (602.18 kN)
- Factor of adh.: 4.02
Career
- Operators: Union Pacific Railroad
- Class: 4884-2
- Numbers: UP 4023
- Last run: 1959
- Retired: 1962
- Preserved: 1963
- Restored: 1974 (cosmetically)
- Current owner: City of South Omaha, Nebraska
- Disposition: On static display

Union Pacific 4023 is a 4000-class 4-8-8-4 "Big Boy" type steam locomotive, preserved on permanent static display at Kenefick Park in South Omaha, Nebraska. Built in November 1944 by the American Locomotive Company's (ALCO) Schenectady Works, No. 4023 is one of eight surviving Big Boys and the only one that is part of the class' second group built in 1944, as all seven of the other survivors were part of the first group built in 1941.

== History ==
In the early 1940s, the Union Pacific Railroad designed the only simple articulated steam locomotive with a 4-8-8-4 wheel arrangement, which would be the largest steam locomotive in the world. The first of these Big Boys were built in 1941 by the American Locomotive Company in Schenectady, New York. No. 4023 is one of the last five built in November 1944, forming part of the second generation of the Big Boys which had more tractive effort than the first generation and produced 6,250 horsepower rather than the first generation's 7,000 hp.

No. 4023 was assigned for fast and heavy freight trains through the Wasatch Mountains and over Sherman Hill. It was given a class 3 overhaul in 1957.

After its last run took place in 1959, No. 4023 was stored in Union Pacific's scrapline with the other Big Boy locomotives. In 1963, No. 4023 was repainted to be put on display for that year's National Railway Historical Society Convention in Cheyenne, Wyoming alongside 4-6-6-4 "Challenger" No. 3985 and 4-8-4 "Northern" No. 844. After the convention, No. 4023 was stored along with No. 3985 in the Cheyenne roundhouse.

In 1974, No. 4023 was cosmetically restored and towed to Omaha, Nebraska, for static display in front of the Union Pacific's locomotive shops. When the shops were closed in 1988, No. 4023 was moved to the original Kenefick Park on Abbott Drive, near the former Union Pacific shop site. After the park's land was taken for an arena and convention center, No. 4023 was temporarily housed outside of the Durham Museum in Downtown Omaha.

In spring 2005, No. 4023 was moved by truck on a highway to the new location of Kenefick Park, where it was put on static display alongside EMD DDA40X No. 6900. During one of its cosmetic restorations, several functional appliances were replaced with new, fake appliances, including the safety valves, whistle, lubricators, and a new boiler jacket. As of 2025, No. 4023 is still on permanent static display at Kenefick Park.
