= Kenefick Park =

Public park in South Omaha, Nebraska

Coordinates: 41°13′56″N 95°55′05″W

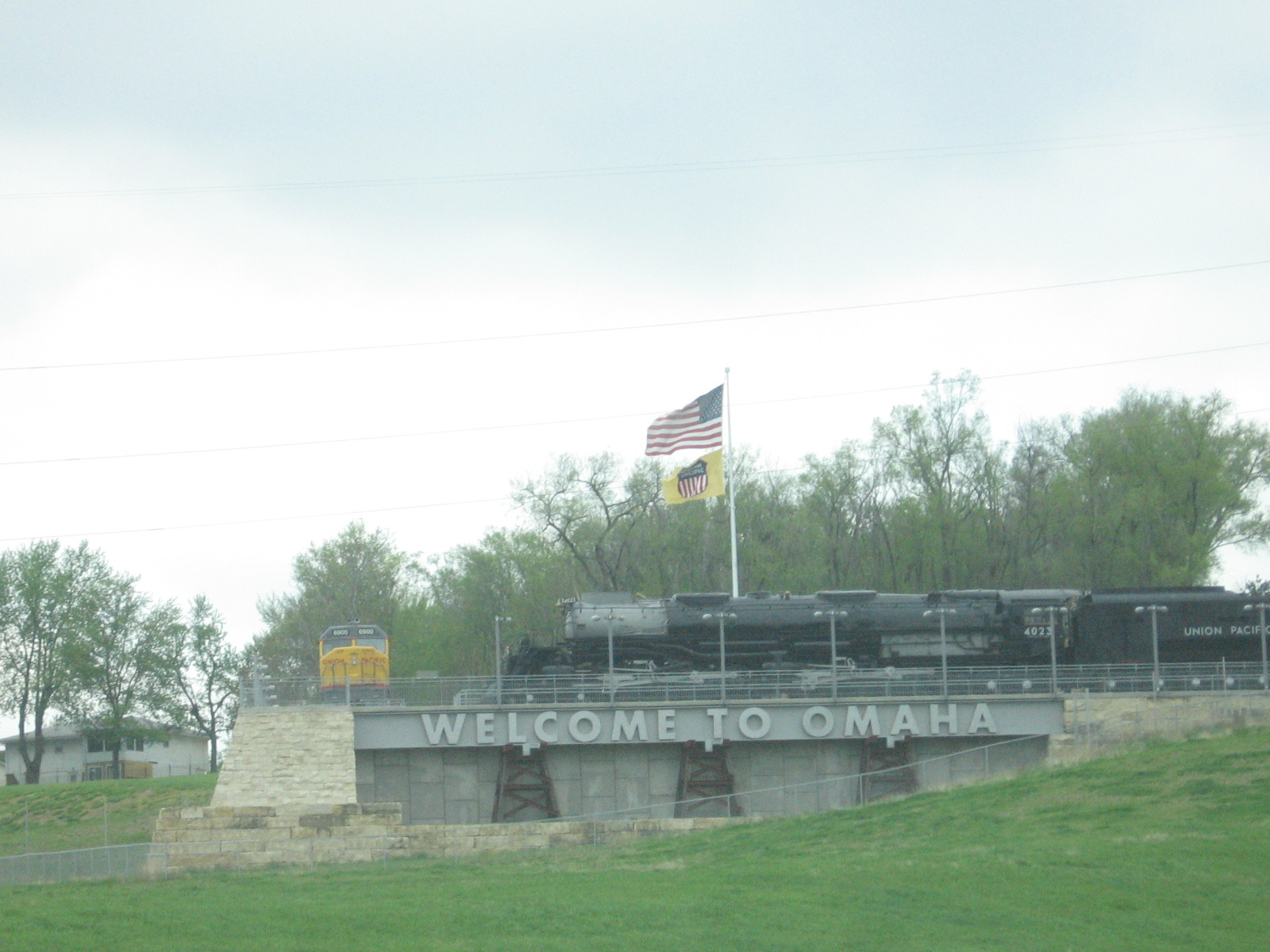
- Kenefick Park as seen from I-80.
- Interactive map of Kenefick Park
- Type: Municipal (Omaha)
- Location: South Omaha
- Area: 78 acres (320,000 m^{2})
- Created: 1891
- Status: Open all year

Kenefick Park is a public park at 100 Bancroft Street in South Omaha, Nebraska, named for John Kenefick, a former chairman and CEO of Union Pacific Railroad.

It is located at the southwest point of the Lauritzen Gardens, Omaha's botanical gardens, just north of Interstate 80, and just west of the Missouri River and the Iowa state border. On static display in the park are examples of two of Union Pacific's most powerful locomotives: EMD DDA40X No. 6900, the first of the class, and Big Boy No. 4023.

In 2004, Kenefick Park was moved from Abbott Drive north of downtown to make way for CenturyLink Center Omaha, an arena and convention center.

== See also ==
- Parks in Omaha
