= Las Vegas Union Plaza station =

Former passenger railroad station in Las Vegas, Nevada

Las Vegas, NV
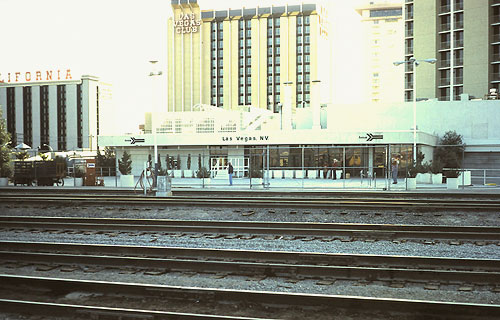
- Las Vegas station, November 1982

General information
- Location: 100 South Main Street Las Vegas, NV 89101; United States
- Coordinates: 36.172355°N 115.147114°W
- Owner: Plaza Hotel & Casino
- Line: UP Cima Subdivision
- Platforms: 1 side platform
- Tracks: 4

History
- Opened: July 7, 1979
- Closed: May 10, 1997

Former services
Preceding station	Amtrak	Following station
Barstow toward Los Angeles	Desert Wind	Caliente toward Chicago
Barstow toward Los Angeles	Las Vegas Limited	Terminus
Preceding station	Union Pacific Railroad	Following station
Bracken toward Los Angeles	Los Angeles and Salt Lake Railroad	Wann toward Salt Lake City
Preceding station	Las Vegas and Tonopah Railroad	Following station
Tule toward Beatty	Main Line	Terminus
Location

Las Vegas Union Plaza station was a passenger railroad station in Las Vegas, Nevada. It was connected to the rear of the Plaza Hotel & Casino and was in service from 1971 until the demise of the Desert Wind in 1997.

== Las Vegas Union Pacific Station ==
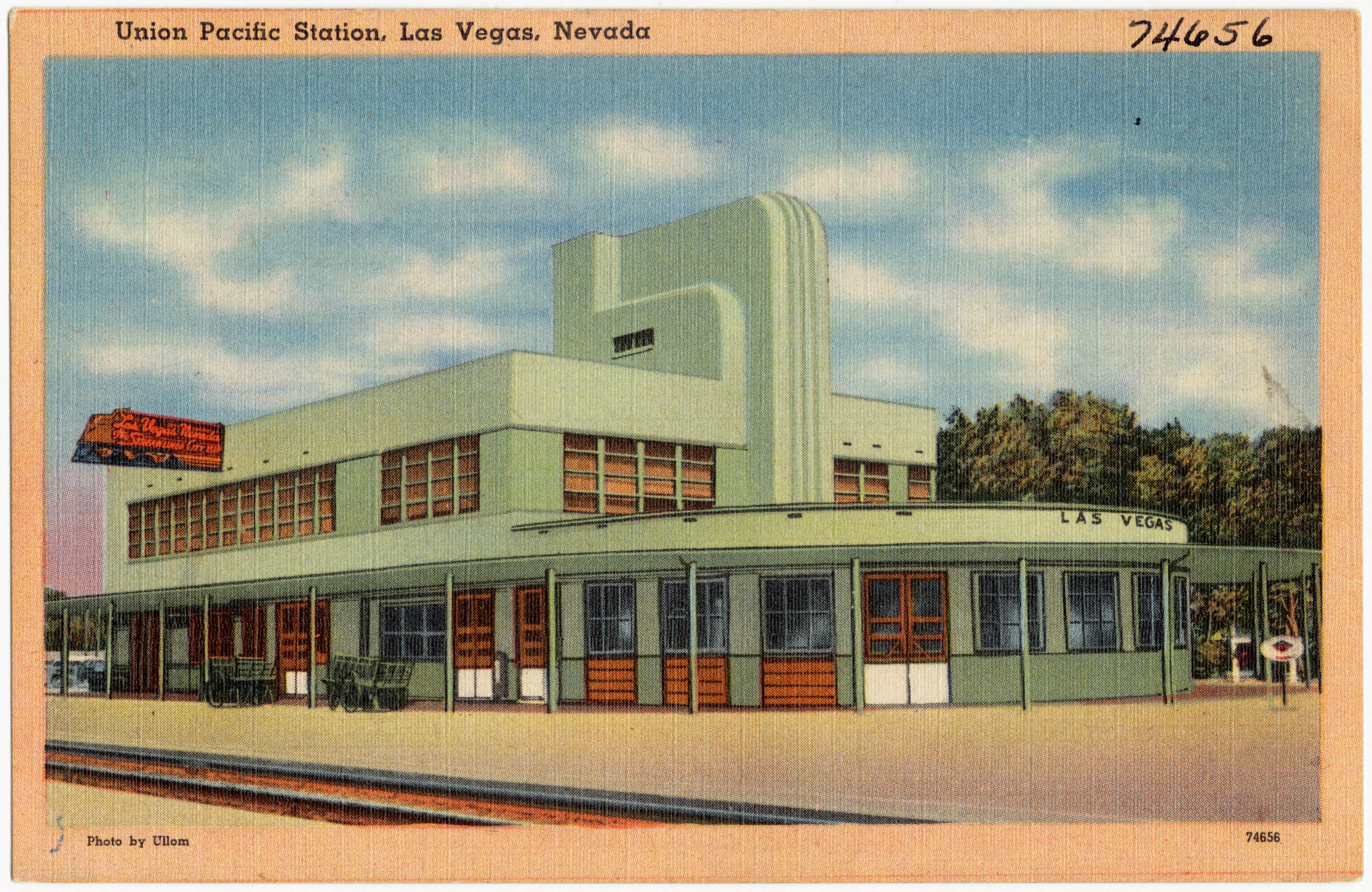
The former Union Pacific Station, Las Vegas, c. 1940–1945

Prior to the construction of the casino, part of the site was used for a Streamline Moderne train station. Constructed in 1940, the station was upgraded with neon lights in 1946.

The station served several Union Pacific trains a day, due for Los Angeles to the west and Salt Lake City, then St. Louis and Chicago to the east. In 1954 early morning departures, the City of Los Angeles and the City of St. Louis headed to Los Angeles headed from the station, and afternoon and evening trains, the Challenger and the Gold Coast-Pony Express departed for Los Angeles. All of these trains, save for the Gold Coast, lasted until Amtrak assumed responsibility for the Union Pacific's passenger operations in May 1971.

This station was demolished in 1971 and replaced by the Union Plaza Hotel, which included a small waiting room to be used as a station for Amtrak trains.

== Union Plaza Hotel and Casino station ==
The Union Plaza Hotel and Casino, originally called the Union Plaza in reference to the Union Pacific railroad station that stood at the site, opened on July 2, 1971. Its original owners included local business people Sam Boyd, Howard Cannon, Jackie Gaughan, and Frank Scott.

Passenger service returned briefly in 1976 with Amtrak's Las Vegas Limited and in 1979 with the Desert Wind.

Before the discontinuation of the Desert Wind train route on May 10, 1997, Amtrak's Las Vegas station was located at the Plaza. The station and ticket windows were directly connected to the hotel. It was the only train station in the U.S. located in a casino. The former station area is now the hotel's gym, and memorabilia from the hotel when it was an Amtrak station is located on the second floor of the casino.

Today, Las Vegas is served by Greyhound Bus from the Salt Lake City Intermodal Hub in Salt Lake City, Utah to Los Angeles Union Station. Greyhound provided service to a station on the first floor of the Plaza Hotel until 2021, when service moved to the South Strip Transit Terminal near Harry Reid International Airport.

== Plans for new rail service to Las Vegas ==
Amtrak planned for restoration of Las Vegas rail service surfaced almost immediately after the discontinuation of the Desert Wind. These plans recommended using Talgo trains between Los Angeles and Las Vegas, similar to Amtrak's Cascades route in the Pacific Northwest. This plan was never implemented and Las Vegas went without passenger rail service. Las Vegas is the largest metro area in the US without passenger rail service.

In 2005 DesertXpress Enterprises LLC was formed in an attempt to restore passenger rail service to Las Vegas Valley, though their terminal is planned to be a newly constructed station in Enterprise, south of Downtown Las Vegas and the Las Vegas Strip. The project was acquired by Florida-based Brightline and changed its name to Brightline West in 2020.

A competing company, Las Vegas Railway Express, also plans to begin passenger rail service between Las Vegas and Southern California, though at lower speeds.
