= Las Vegas station =

Las Vegas station may refer to:

- Las Vegas station (New Mexico), an Amtrak station in San Miguel County, New Mexico
- Las Vegas Union Plaza station, a former Amtrak station in Nevada
- Las Vegas station (Brightline West), a proposed high-speed rail station in Nevada
