= MRB =

MRB could refer to:

- Eastern WV Regional Airport, Martinsburg, West Virginia, United States; IATA airport code
- Maidenhead Railway Bridge
- Malaysian Rubber Board
- Manorbier railway station, Wales; National Rail station code MRB
- Maribo railway station, Denmark (code Mrb)
- Mariënberg railway station, Mariënberg, the Netherlands (code Mrb)
- Marijuana-related businesses, business activities that are related to marijuana and might be sanctioned in some countries
- Marina Bay MRT station, Singapore; station abbreviation MRB
- Martinsburg (Amtrak station), West Virginia, United States; Amtrak station code MRB
- Metallica Resources; New York Stock Exchange symbol MRB
- Michael Reilly Burke
- Mobile Riverine Base, see Mobile Riverine Force
- Mortgage revenue bond loan
- MrBookmaker.com cycling team, see Cycle Collstrop
- MRB constant
- MRB Productions
- Murrumbeena railway station, Melbourne, Australia; station code MRB
- Mullamangalath Raman Bhattathiripad, Malayali social reformer and writer
- Mother Russia Bleeds, a 2016 video game
- Modified reflected binary code, a code similar to a Gray code
- Main Roads Board, former government agency in New South Wales, Australia
