= High Desert Corridor =

Proposed multi-modal corridor in Southern California

Overview
- Owner: Caltrans and Los Angeles Metro
- Locale: Los Angeles and San Bernardino Counties
- Termini: Palmdale Transportation Center; Victor Valley station
- Connecting lines: California High-Speed Rail, Brightline West
- Stations: 2
- Website: highdesertcorridor.org

Service
- Type: High-speed railway

Technical
- Line length: 54 mi (87 km)
- Number of tracks: 2
- Track gauge: 4 ft 8 1/2 in (1,435 mm) standard gauge
- Electrification: 25 kV 60 Hz AC overhead line

The High Desert Corridor is a proposed multimodal corridor in northern Los Angeles and San Bernardino Counties in the U.S. state of California. The project, which will travel between Palmdale and Apple Valley through the High Desert region, would mainly consist of a high-speed rail line connecting the California High-Speed Rail system at its proposed Palmdale station with the Brightline West route at its proposed Victor Valley station.

== Current status ==
As of August 2024, the project has been in an early planning phase. Regulatory approval according to federal environmental legislation NEPA as well as funding for construction was still outstanding.

The project is managed by the High Desert Corridor Joint Powers Agency (HDC JPA), a Joint powers authority owned by LA County, Los Angeles Metro, and surrounding cities. Project development has been funded mainly with contribution from the state of California and Los Angeles Metro. Federal funding has been limited to a $500,000 grant from the Corridor ID program administered by the FRA, which provides seed funding for early planning and prioritizes the project for further federal funding, but does not guarantee it.

== Project history ==
The High Desert Corridor along with current and planned future rail connections in Southern California.

The first public meetings for the project were held in 2011 when the project was mainly a road project: The proposed freeway between Palmdale and Victorville would include a sufficient median as an option for any future high-speed rail or Metrolink connection. The first 50 out of 63 miles were estimated to cost $3 billion and were planned to be funded via a public-private partnership. At the time, the California High-Speed Rail project had received its initial federal funding only two years prior and had not yet begun construction, whereas the planned high-speed link between Las Vegas and Southern California now being undertaken by Brightline West was a private project still under development under the name "DesertXpress".

In 2016, final documents of the environmental impact review led by Caltrans were published, clearing a requirement for planning approval set by Californian state law CEQA. The documents stated the intention to acquire enough right-of-way to sustain space for up to five freeway lanes in each direction and a high-speed rail line.

As of February 2018, the freeway project cost was estimated at $8 billion and land acquisition was planned to commence in June that year, funded by $274 million in Measure M funds. The environmental advocacy group Climate Resolve filed a lawsuit challenging the validity of the environmental impact review.

In September 2019, Caltrans settled the lawsuit put forth by Climate Resolve in 2016, which included the provision that the freeway portion of the project could not proceed absent a Supplemental Environmental Review (SEIR). However, the freeway was reportedly put on hold before the settlement due to a lack of necessity and funding. The rail and bike lane portion of the project were not affected.

In June 2022, San Bernardino County withdrew from the then joint powers authority (JPA). The current JPA is a successor entity set up by its continuing members.
