= Placid series =

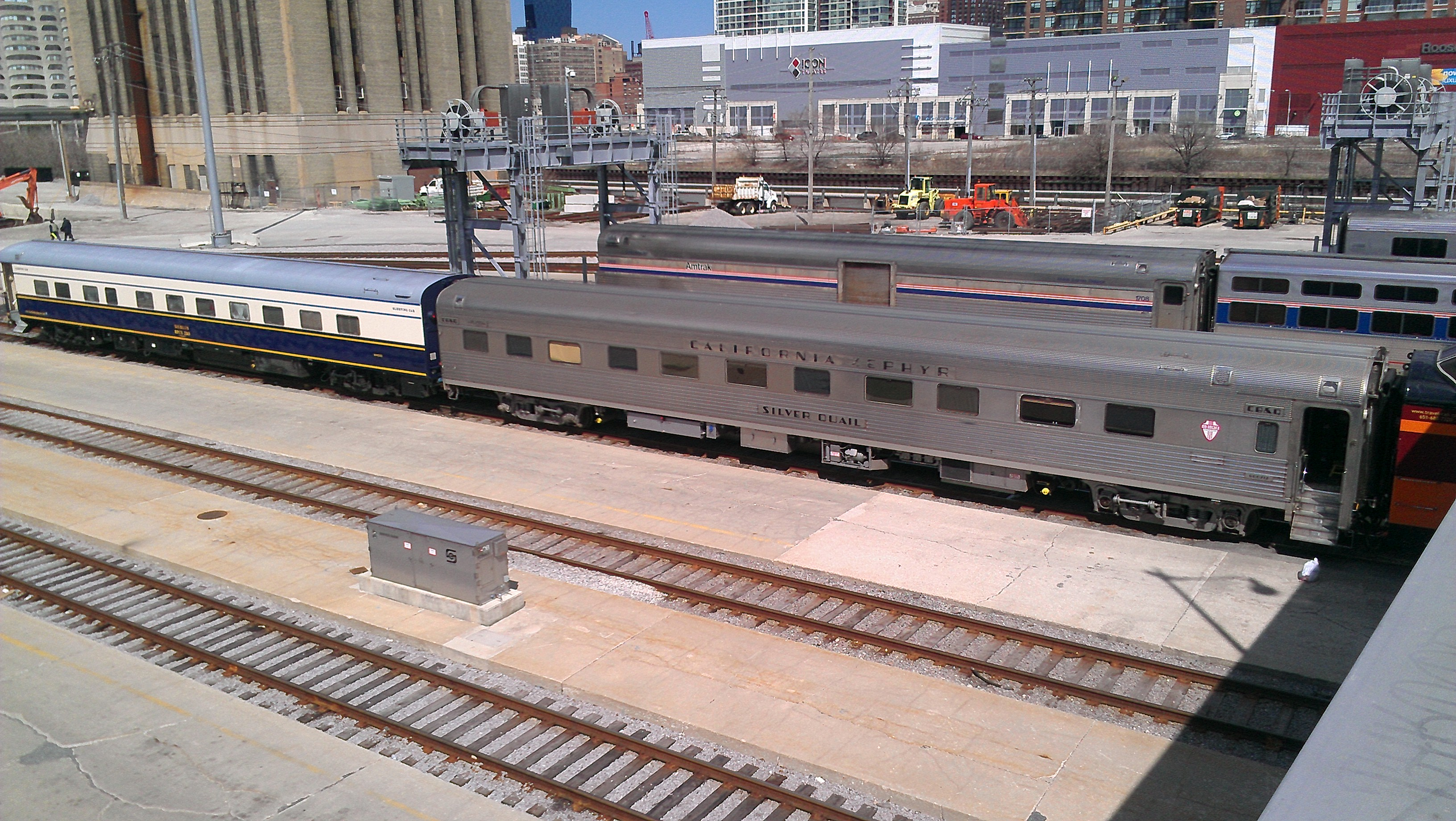
- At left is the former Placid Lake, now the private sleeping car Berlin, still in American Orient Express colors.
- In service: 1956–1984
- Manufacturer: Pullman-Standard
- Order no.: Lot 6958
- Constructed: 1956
- Number built: 10
- Diagram: Plan 4198
- Fleet numbers: UP: 1501–1510; Amtrak: 2260–2269
- Capacity: 11 double bedrooms
- Operators: Pullman Company; Union Pacific Railroad; Amtrak; American Orient Express

Specifications
- Car length: 85 feet 0 inches (25.91 m)
- Track gauge: 4 ft 8 1/2 in (1,435 mm)

The Placid series was a fleet of ten lightweight streamlined sleeping cars built by Pullman-Standard for the Union Pacific Railroad in 1956. Each car contained eleven double bedrooms. Amtrak acquired all ten from the Union Pacific and operated them into the 1980s; it retired the last in 1996. Several cars remain in private use.

== Design ==
As with all cars built for the Union Pacific, save the Pacific series sleeping cars, the Placid series cars were smooth-sided, not corrugated.

== Service history ==
The Union Pacific took delivery of all ten cars in 1956 and they saw service on a variety of trains, including the City of Portland and City of Los Angeles.

Amtrak acquired all ten cars from the Union Pacific in 1971 and operated them through the 1970s; all but one were retired by 1981. The remainder, Placid Scene, it converted from steam heating to head end power (HEP) in 1984 as part of its Heritage Fleet program, part of a pool of nine 11-bedroom sleeping cars. Amtrak assigned Placid Scene to the revived Auto Train. In 1996 Amtrak sold it to American Orient Express, who renamed it Grand Canyon. There it was reunited with three other of the Placid series: Berlin (ex-Placid Lake), Vienna (ex-Placid Waters), and Placid Bay.

Table of names and numbers
Name	UP No.	Amtrak No.	Notes
Placid Bay	1501	2260	
Placid Harbor	1502	2261	
Placid Haven	1503	2262	
Placid Lake	1504	2263	Renamed "Berlin" during its time in the American Orient Express
Placid Meadow	1505	2264	
Placid Scene	1506	2265	Renamed "Grand Canyon" during its time in the American Orient Express. After the dissolution of the AOE, it was renamed back to Placid Scene. Currently for sale as of Feb 2024
Placid Sea	1507	2266	
Placid Vale	1508	2267	
Placid Valley	1509	2268	
Placid Waters	1510	2269	Renamed "Vienna" during its time in the American Orient Express
