= Victor Valley station =

Brightline West Rail station in California

Victor Valley

General information
- Location: Apple Valley, California
- Coordinates: 34°38′15″N 117°13′07″W
- System: Brightline West station
- Owner: DesertXpress Enterprises, LLC
- Operator: Brightline West
- Tracks: 2

Construction
- Structure type: Train station, Retail, Parking

History
- Opening: 2029

Future service
Preceding station	Brightline	Following station
Las Vegas Terminus	Brightline West Cajon Pass Route	Hesperia toward Rancho Cucamonga
Las Vegas Terminus	Brightline West High Desert Corridor	Palmdale Terminus
Location

Victor Valley is a future high-speed rail station of Brightline West, running to Las Vegas Boulevard in the Las Vegas Valley and south to Rancho Cucamonga.

The station will be at the north end of Apple Valley adjacent to Interstate 15 at Dale Evans Parkway. Passenger platforms will be in the median of I-15 and accessed via walkway under the northbound lanes of the highway. Construction permits were acquired in March 2020 by Brightline. The area will include a maintenance facility. The site also sits near existing freight rail tracks with existing Amtrak Southwest Chief services to Chicago and Los Angeles and future connections possible with the location of both sites.

== History ==
Then developer DesertXpress signed a document with Los Angeles County Metropolitan Transportation Authority officials in June 2012 to explore the plan to build a 50-mile (80 km) high-speed rail link between Victor Valley and Palmdale. The link would initially connect to the Metrolink commuter rail system in Palmdale. This would allow passengers to complete a train ride between Los Angeles and Las Vegas with one transfer by using Metrolink in the Los Angeles area and a transfer to the high-speed train at Palmdale station with Victor Valley serving as a through station for the line. The original plan was that the train would travel at speeds of up to 150 miles per hour (240 km/h) averaging 130 miles per hour (210 km/h) and making the 186-mile (299 km) trip from Victor Valley to Las Vegas Valley in about 1 hour 24 minutes. That was subject to funding that never was allocated for the project. In 2018, Brightline West bought the projects plans and made a newer plan with 200-mile-per-hour (320 km/h) trains making the journey from Victor Valley much faster and slightly changing the station design.

In 2023, the station was reconfigured to have passenger platforms in the highway median. The vehicle maintenance facility was moved from the Victor Valley site to a 5-acre parcel (2.0 ha) west of I-15 in Sloan, Nevada and will connect to the Union Pacific mainline at this location.
