= California–Nevada Interstate Maglev =

Former proposed Maglev in California and Nevada

Overview
- Status: Proposed
- Locale: California, Nevada
- Termini: Anaheim, California (West); Las Vegas, Nevada (East)
- Stations: 7

Service
- Type: Maglev
- Operator(s): TBD

Technical
- Line length: 269 mi (432.9 km)

The California–Nevada Interstate Maglev project was a proposed 269 mi (433 km) Maglev train line from Las Vegas, Nevada, to Anaheim, California. One segment would run from Las Vegas to Primm, Nevada, with proposed service to the Las Vegas area's forthcoming Ivanpah Valley Airport. The top speed would be 310 mph (500 km/h). Though $45 million was appropriated in 2005 for the planning phase for the first 40 mi (64 km) segment, the money was never spent, and was finally reallocated to a highway project in a Las Vegas Airport in June 2010. The maglev project was not in the 2012 transportation plan under consideration by the Southern California Association of Governments. Removing it from the plan means that the project cannot receive federal funds, even for studies. The Southern California Association of Governments did leave a portion of the route – from Anaheim to Ontario – in their 2012 transportation plan.

American Magline Group, working with the California-Nevada Super Speed Train Commission, has received most of the government funds released so far. The German consortium famous for the Shanghai Maglev Train, Transrapid International, has performed some research into it as well; hoping to demonstrate its technology on a long-distance route. In August 2014, the backers of the scheme were seeking to revive interest in the proposal. In October 2018, it was reported that the LA-LV maglev project was over in 2012.

In September 2019, it was reported that Brightline West, formerly known as XpressWest, and Virgin Trains USA, intended to begin construction in the first half of 2020 of a competing non-maglev route between Victor Valley and Las Vegas.

== History ==
In the late 1970s and 1980s, Nevada politicians talked of a "bullet train" to connect Southern California to Las Vegas. Since the 1997 termination of the Amtrak-run Desert Wind, Las Vegas has been without any passenger train service. Plans to resume service using a Talgo train have failed to gain traction due to the high cost of upgrades to the existing track, much of it being only a single track as of 2006. With McCarran International Airport expected to reach capacity in a few years and I-15 upgrades for more lanes an ongoing project, an alternative mode of transportation between Southern California and Las Vegas is considered important by multiple transportation planners. As a result, a maglev train was proposed in the late 1990s.

Operating on a dedicated track, it would not be subject to delays from freight trains, a problem that plagued the old Amtrak service. As a high-speed service, it would be able to compete with airlines for passengers, especially from the outlying areas of Southern California.

Funding allocated to date:

- $1 million on December 8, 2004, in the 2005FY appropriation bill.
- $45 million (later withdrawn) for planning in the 2006FY Federal appropriation bill for the Las Vegas to Primm segment. The money was redirected to a highway project at McCarran International Airport.

The maglev project's cost has recently been estimated to be around $12 billion. In June 2010, it lost key support from Senator Harry Reid, who then stated support for the privately financed Desert Xpress (later Brightline West) project. The availability of these funds for the Maglev project were withdrawn at the direction of Reid by language contained in the Federal "Jobs Bill" passed in March 2010. In a press release, the Senator claimed the Maglev Commission had failed to raise the required matching funds of 20%; a claim subsequently disputed by American Magline Group President Neil Cummings, who reported raising $10 million. Reid then noted that the commission had "failed to complete an environmental impact statement", the value of which was counted as part of the "$10 million" in matching funds claimed to have been raised by the Magline Group, despite the statement being unfinished. The project's technology also remains controversial among rail enthusiasts since it is untried in the United States.

The application for $83 million was filed by the California-Nevada Super Speed Commission, but according to the federal department, "only states, groups of states, interstate compacts, and public agencies established by one or more states" were eligible. While the Super Speed Train Commission is ostensibly a bi-state body, there is a wrinkle, a senior Transportation Department official said. Nevada established its part as a state agency, but in California, it was formed as a "nonprofit public benefit corporation."

== Route ==
- Las Vegas, Nevada
- Ivanpah Valley Airport
- Primm, Nevada
- Barstow, California
- Victorville, California
- Ontario, California
- Anaheim, California

== Alternative projects ==
=== Amtrak ===
Amtrak proposed upgrading the existing rail line to allow high-speed Talgo trains. A high-profile publicity event was staged in December 1999. The implementation of this option is in limbo since the Union Pacific claims to lack capacity on the existing rail line. As of 2009, the project has been on hold and is unlikely to be revived.

=== Brightline West ===
Through a series of acquisitions, Brightline (then known as Virgin Trains USA) acquired rights to a privately owned high-speed rail line running nonstop from Victorville, California, to Las Vegas, a 200-mile run (320 km) along the I-15 corridor. The project was first proposed by Desert Xpress Enterprises as Desert Xpress. The name of the project was changed to XpressWest, and finally Brightline West. Construction had begun in 2024 with service in 2028.

== See also ==
- California High-Speed Rail
