= City of Los Angeles (train) =

Union Pacific passenger train

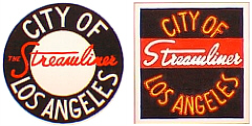

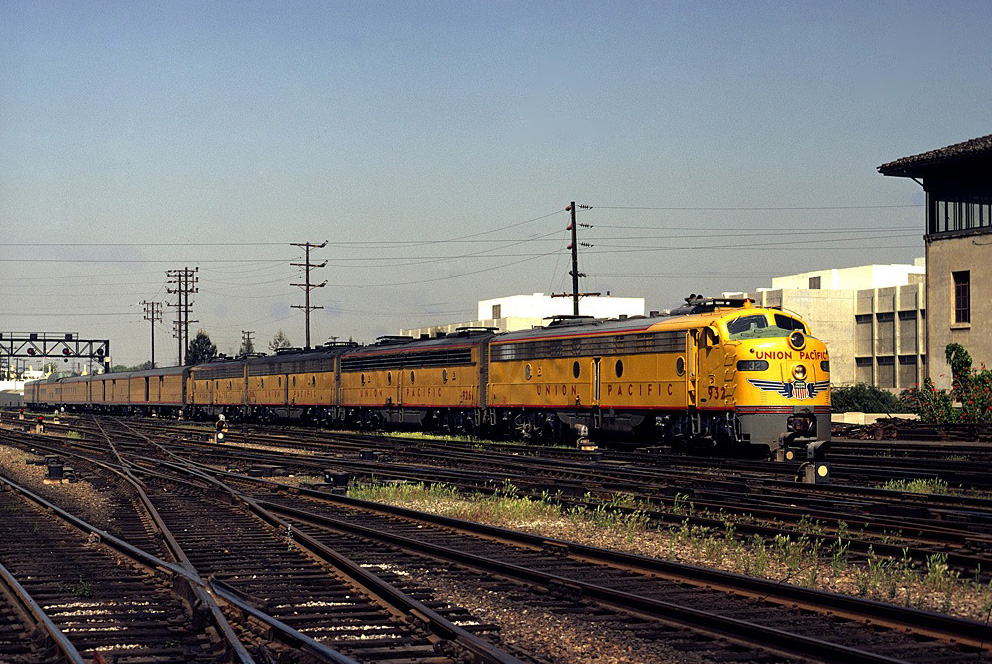
- UP #932, an EMD E8, leads the City of Los Angeles into Union Station in Los Angeles in March 1971, just prior to discontinuance.

Overview
- Service type: Inter-city rail
- Status: Discontinued
- Locale: Western United States
- First service: May 15, 1936
- Last service: May 2, 1971
- Successor: Desert Wind
- Former operators: Chicago and North Western Railway; Union Pacific Railroad; Milwaukee Road

Route
- Termini: Chicago, Illinois; Los Angeles, California
- Stops: 20
- Average journey time: 40 hours, 45 minutes (Chicago - Los Angeles); 40 hours, 30 minutes (Los Angeles - Chicago)
- Service frequency: Daily
- Train numbers: 103 (Chicago - Los Angeles); 104 (Los Angeles - Chicago)
- Line used: Overland Route

On-board services
- Class: Coach Class
- Sleeping arrangements: Streamlined Sleeping cars; Double Bedrooms; Drawing Rooms; Compartments; Roommates
- Catering facilities: Cafe Lounge Car; Dome Dining Car
- Observation facilities: Dome lounge
- Baggage facilities: Limited handling

Technical
- Track gauge: 4 ft 8 1/2 in (1,435 mm)
- Operating speed: 56.4 mph (Chicago - Los Angeles); 56.8 mph (Los Angeles - Chicago)

The City of Los Angeles was a streamlined passenger train between Chicago, Illinois, and Los Angeles, California, via Omaha, Nebraska, and Ogden, Utah. Between Omaha and Los Angeles, it ran on the Union Pacific Railroad; east of Omaha, it ran on the Chicago and North Western Railway until October 1955, and on the Milwaukee Road thereafter. The train had number 103 westbound and number 104 eastbound.

This train was the top-of-the-line for UP, which marketed it as a competitor to the Super Chief, a streamlined passenger train on the Atchison, Topeka and Santa Fe Railway, and the Golden State, a streamlined passenger train jointly operated by the Rock Island and Southern Pacific railroads. Many of the train's cars bore the names of locales in and around its namesake city.

== History ==
City of Los Angeles service began in May 1936 using the diesel-powered custom streamliner M-10002. It was the second of Union Pacific's diesel streamliners to the west coast, following the City of Portland that started service nearly a year earlier. Initial service consisted of five runs monthly. CNW / UP replaced that set with a fourteen unit full-sized train pulled by a three-unit set of EMC E2 locomotives in December 1937. Service frequency was doubled in July 1938 with the former City of San Francisco streamliner M-10004. That set was replaced in March 1939 with a full-size train pulled by two-unit EMC E3 locomotive set. After World War II service was expanded with additional trains until daily service was achieved in 1947.

The UP scored a public relations coup in the mid-1950s when the City of Los Angeles was featured in two episodes of the popular television series I Love Lucy. Starting in 1955 the Milwaukee Road tracks were used in place of the Chicago and North Western between Chicago and Omaha. Actor Ronald Reagan often traveled on this train and even did a full-page print ad for it that appeared in the National Geographic magazine. In a cost-cutting move, the City of Los Angeles was combined with the City of San Francisco in 1960. City of Los Angeles service was terminated after Amtrak took over Union Pacific's passenger rail services on May 1, 1971.

Amtrak operated several excursion services on the Los Angeles–Las Vegas segment from 1972 to 1976, ending with the short-lived Las Vegas Limited. From 1979 to 1997, Amtrak operated the Salt Lake City–Los Angeles (Ogden–Los Angeles until 1983) Desert Wind; it connected to the Oakland–Chicago California Zephyr at its northern end, once again offering Chicago–Los Angeles through service.

=== Timeline ===
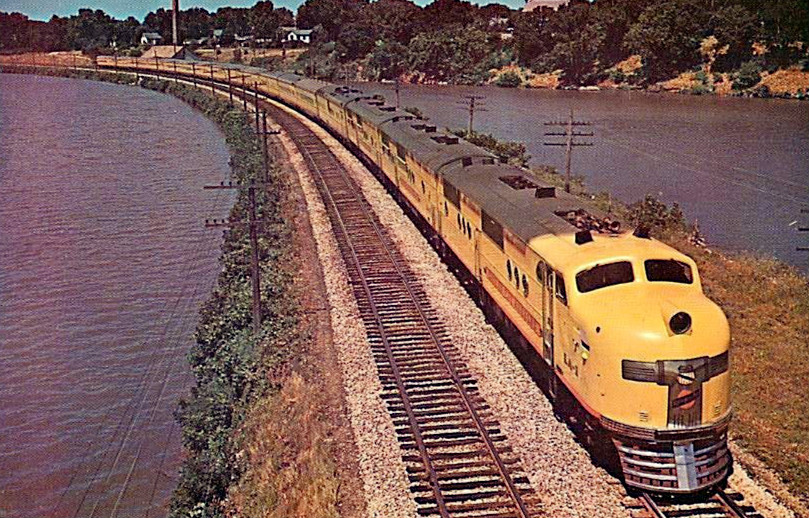
The E2-powered train circa 1941. Slate gray crudely painted over originally brown roof.

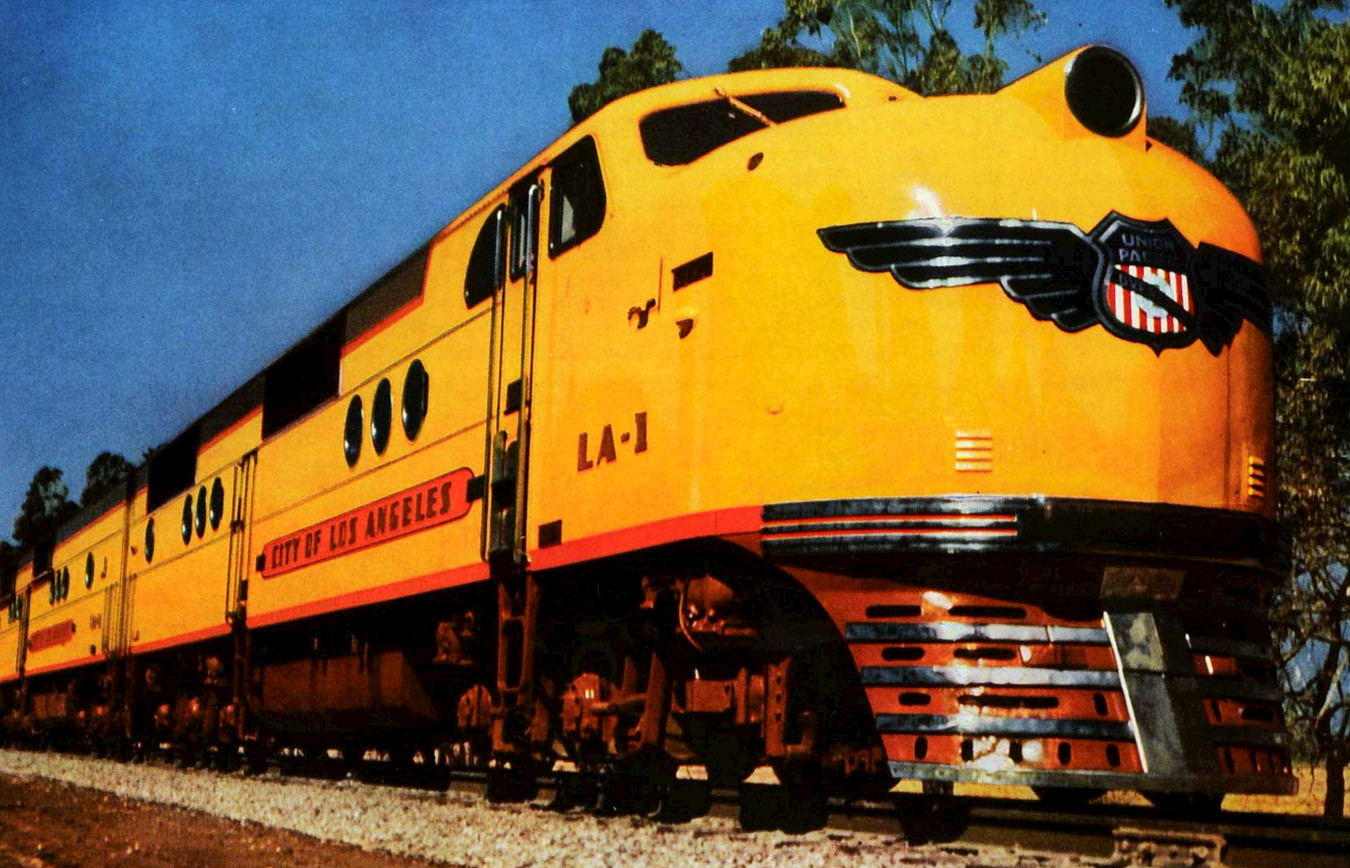
1944 advertisement. Winged emblem has replaced badge plates. Roof trim complete.

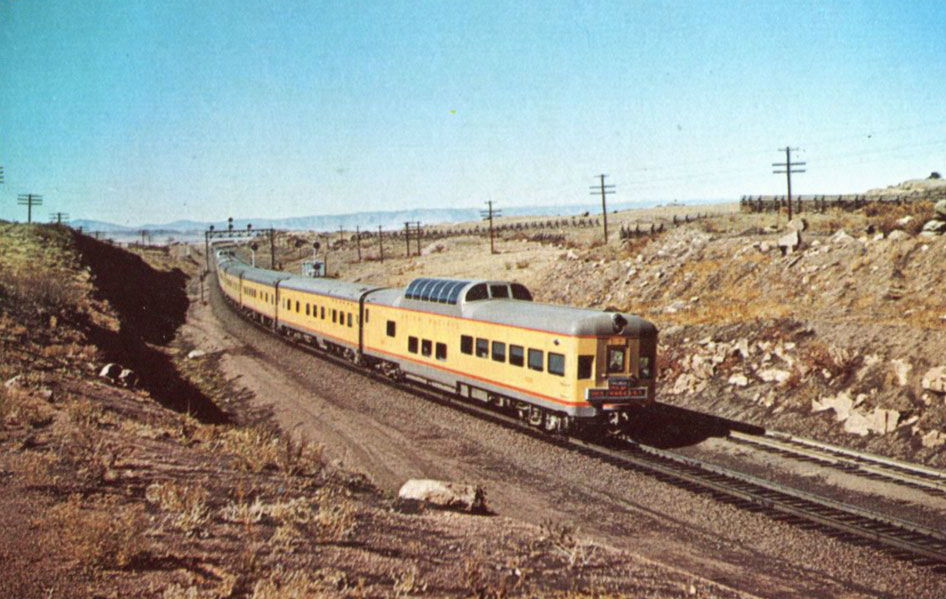
Circa 1955 westbound at Hermosa, WY.

- May 15, 1936: City of Los Angeles makes its first run between Chicago, Illinois and Los Angeles, California. One trainset (the M-10002) leaves each terminal five times a month.
- December 1937: 14-car 791-ton train powered by three EMC E2s replaces the older trainset, reassigned as City of Portland.
- July 1938: Former City of San Francisco trainset M-10004 joins service, allowing departures ten times a month.
- March 1939: New train powered by two unit EMC E3 set enters service, replacing M-10004; frequency remains ten departures per month. The Hollywood, a lounge car built for the City of Los Angeles, is the first passenger car with an interior built entirely of synthetic materials, including the newly invented formica (plastic) and naugahyde.
- July 1941: EMC E6 three unit set replaces E3 set; consist of train expanded to 14 cars.
- 1947: City of Los Angeles begins running daily.
- 1955: Astra Dome dome cars are added to the City of Los Angeles. The Milwaukee Road takes over operation of the City of Los Angeles from the Chicago and North Western Railway between Chicago and Omaha.
- 1956: Challenger and City of Los Angeles are combined and operate on the City of Los Angeles schedule. (The Challenger operated on its own schedule during a couple of summers thereafter.)
- 1970: Dome dining cars retired and replaced with standard flat top cars.
- 1971: Amtrak took over intercity passenger operations in the United States on May 1, 1971. The final City of Los Angeles trips left their terminals on April 30 and arrived on May 2, ending UP passenger service.

=== Other railroad uses of the name City of Los Angeles ===
The City of Los Angeles name has also been applied to a 48-seat diner built by the St. Louis Car Company in 1949. The car was originally UP No. 4808 and is currently owned and operated by the Union Pacific as part of their excursion fleet.

== Equipment ==
The City of Los Angeles began running in 1936 using the articulated M-10002 trainset. Behind the two power units were an RPO-baggage car, a baggage-dormitory-kitchen, a diner-lounge, an 11-section sleeping car, a 7-double bedroom 2-compartment sleeper, two more 11-section sleepers, a 48-seat coach, and a 38-seat coach-buffet car. All the passenger-carrying cars were air-conditioned. The Union Pacific replaced it with a non-articulated train in late 1937. A trio of EMC E2 diesel locomotives pulled a baggage-dormitory car, two 52-seat coaches, a coffee shop-kitchen car, a dining car, a dormitory-buffet lounge, seven sleeping cars of varying configurations, and a buffet-lounge-observation car. Union Pacific added a second articulated trainset in 1938, the M-10004. Its configuration was similar to the M-10002: two power units, a baggage-dormitory, 40- and 48-seat coaches, a coffee-shop kitchen, a diner, an 11-section sleeper, two 7-double bedroom 2-compartment sleepers, two more 11-section sleepers, and a buffet-lounge-observation car. The second articulated trainset was replaced with an eleven car non-articulated train powered by an EMC E3 twin locomotive set in March 1939. In July 1941 the E3 locomotive set was replaced with a three unit E6 set and the consist expanded to 14 cars. The two three-locomotive, 14 car trains were joined after the end of the war by new E7-powered trains, establishing daily service in 1947. The E2 locomotives were traded in 1953.

A typical City of Los Angeles train consist around 1955 included:

- EMD E9 A-B-A diesel locomotive set
- Mail express 5707
- Baggage 5606
- Baggage dormitory 3107
- Placid series sleeper 11-double bedroom Placid Lake
- Placid series sleeper 11-double bedroom Placid Dune
- Sleeper 4-4-2 Imperial Hill
- Astra Dome diner 8008
- Sleeper 4-4-2 Imperial Club
- Sleeper 5-2-2 Ocean Beach
- Sleeper 5-2-2 Ocean Bay
- Astra Dome lounge observation 9009

=== Gallery ===
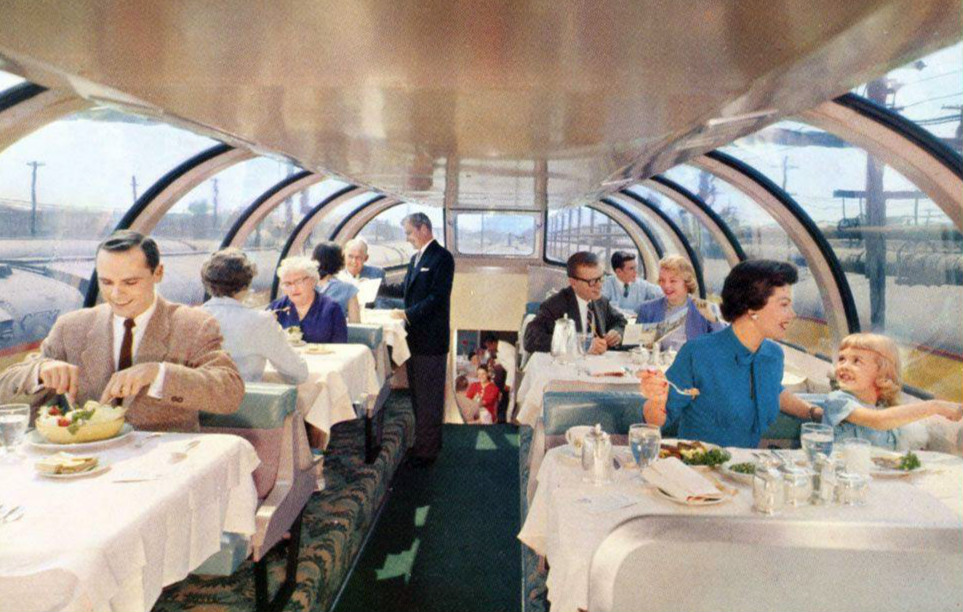
Domeliner diner upper level.

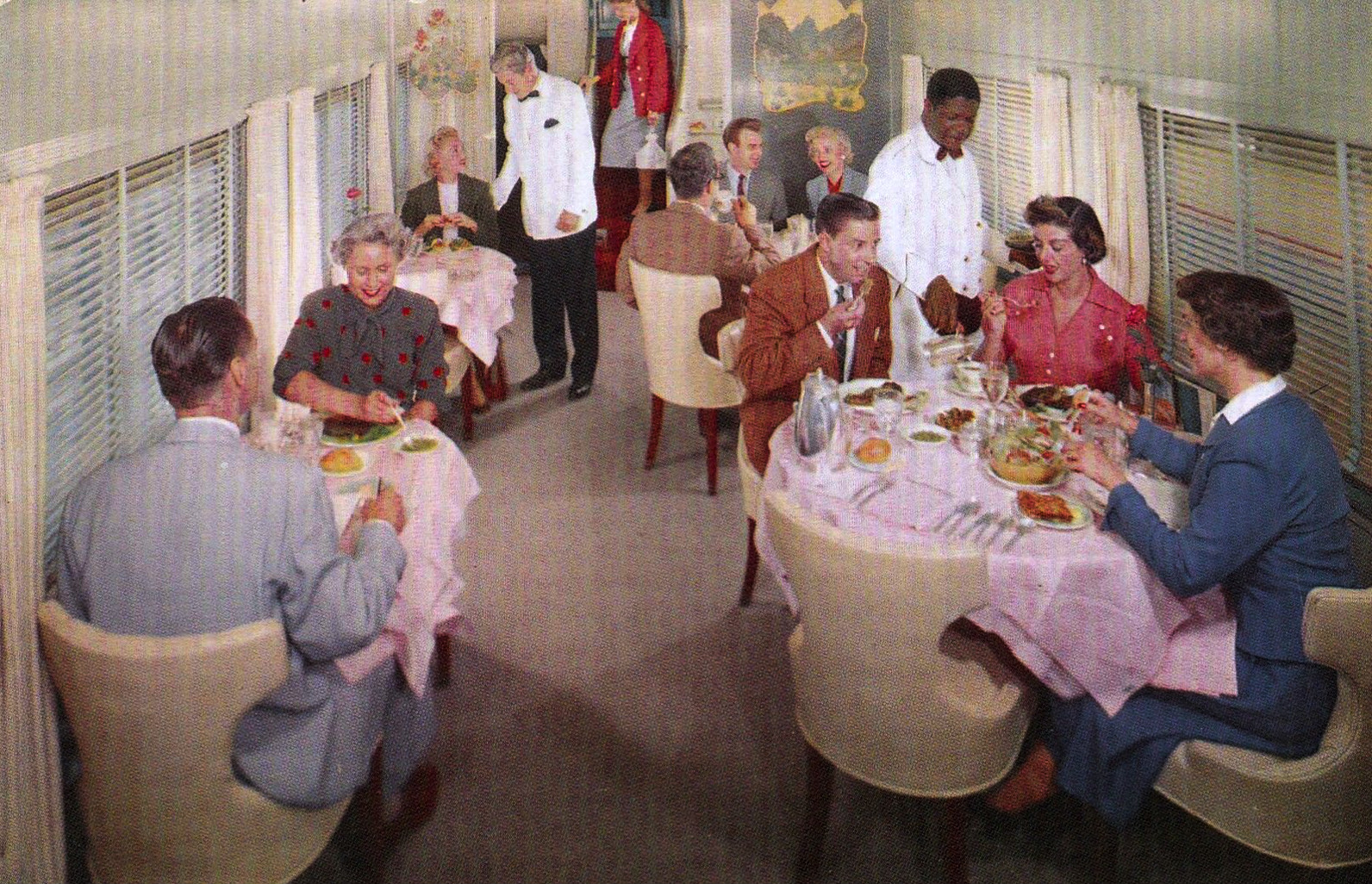
Domeliner diner lower level.

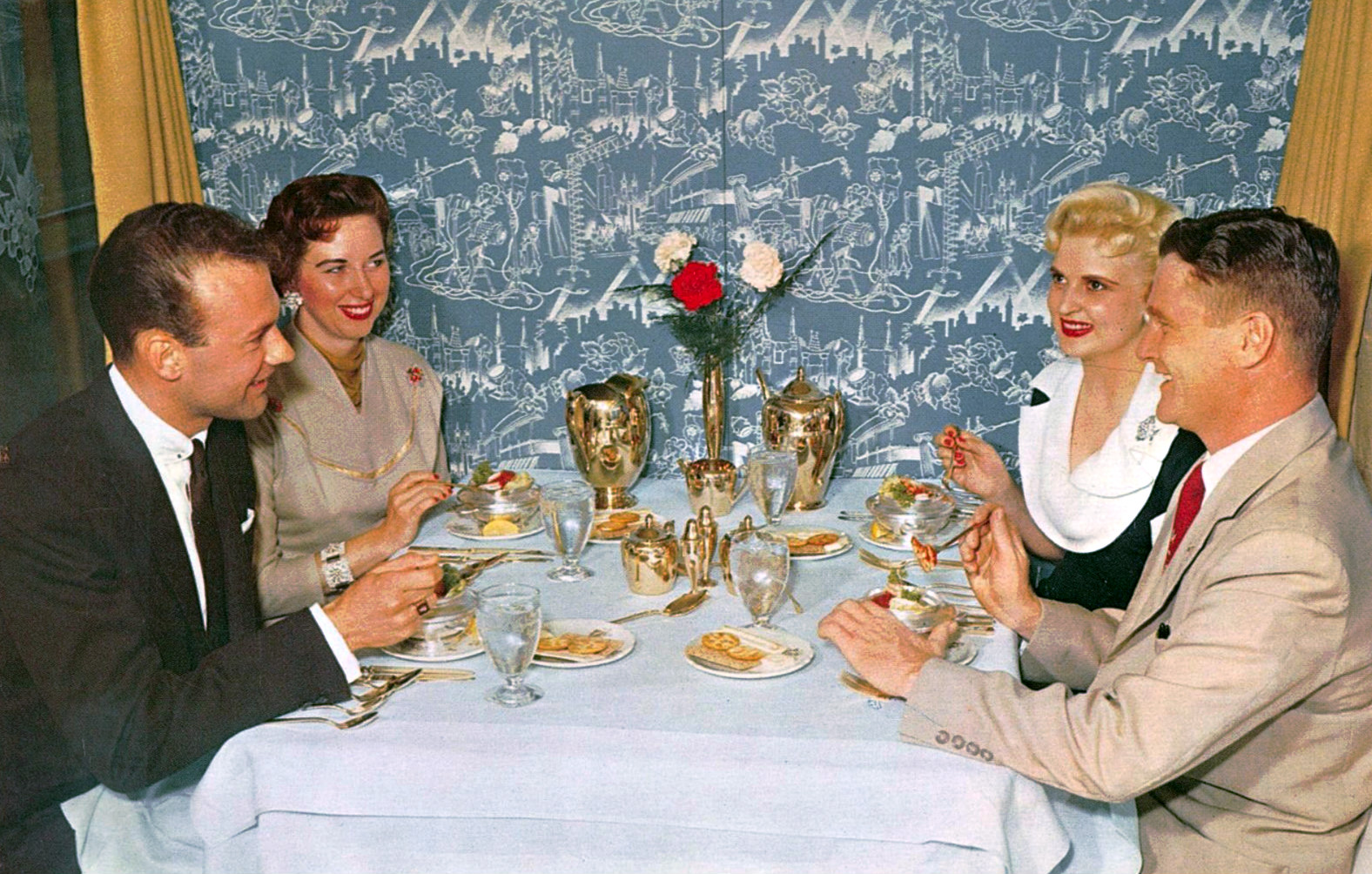
The Gold Room, a private dining room available by reservation.

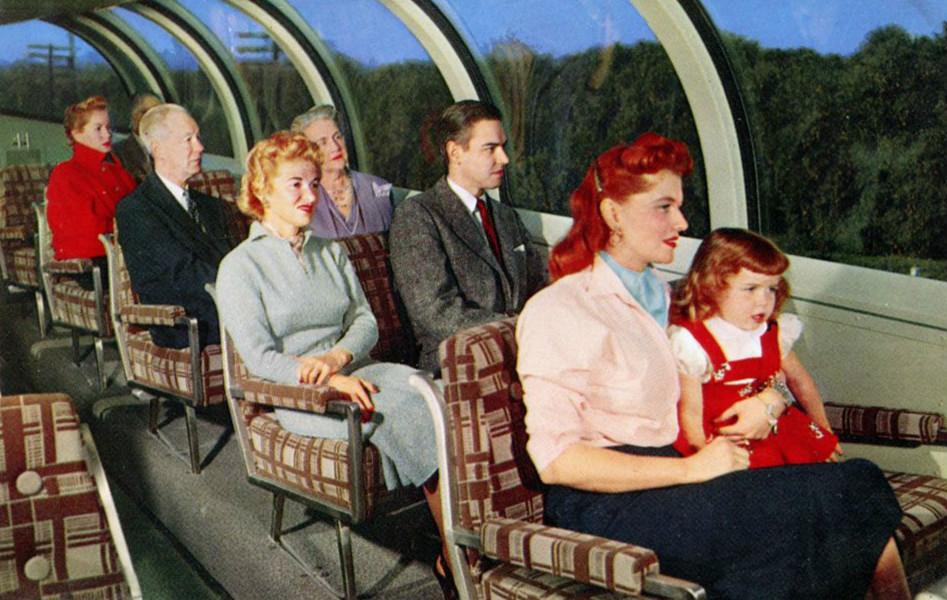
Astra Dome observation car.

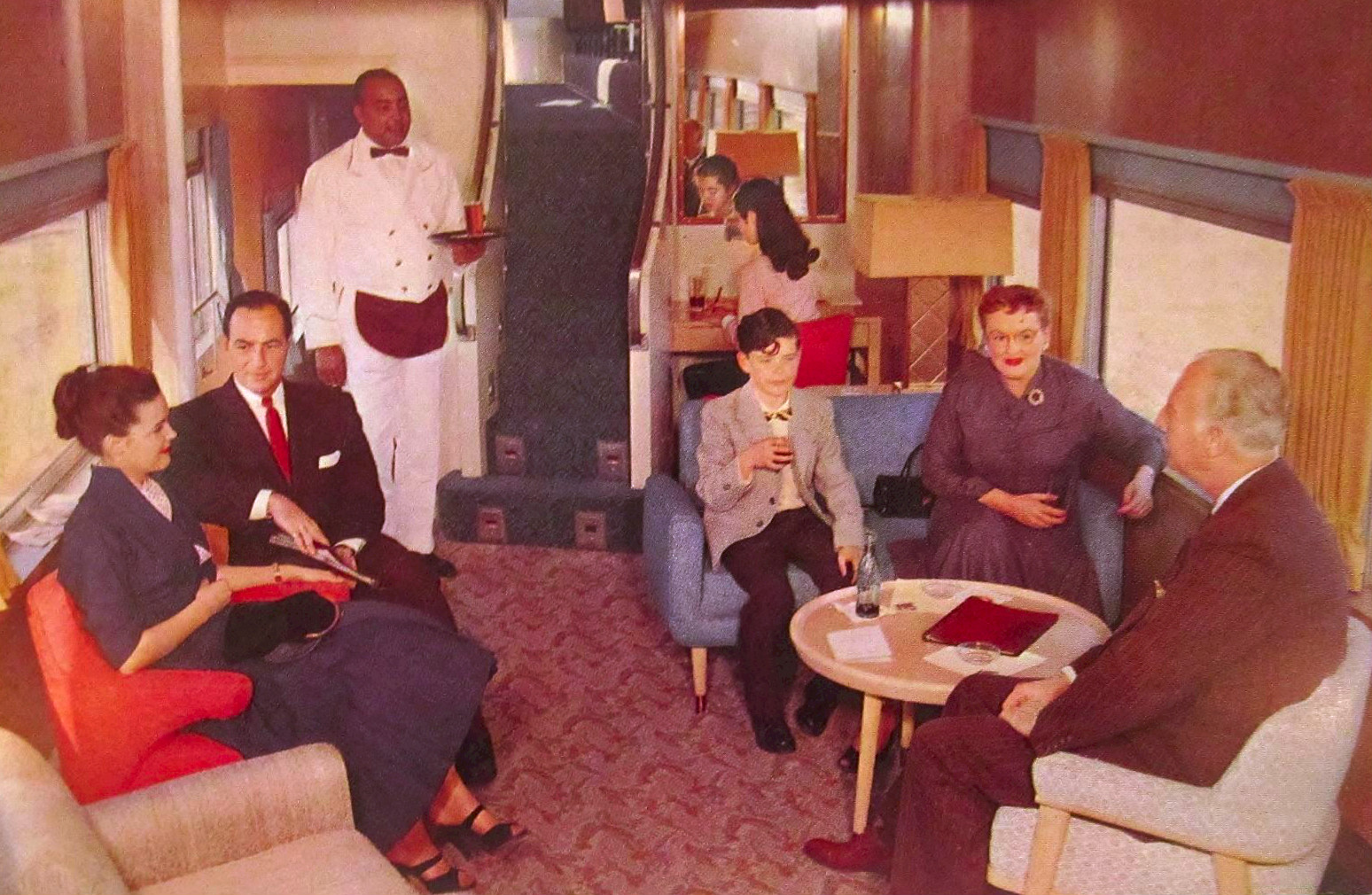
Astra Dome lower level.

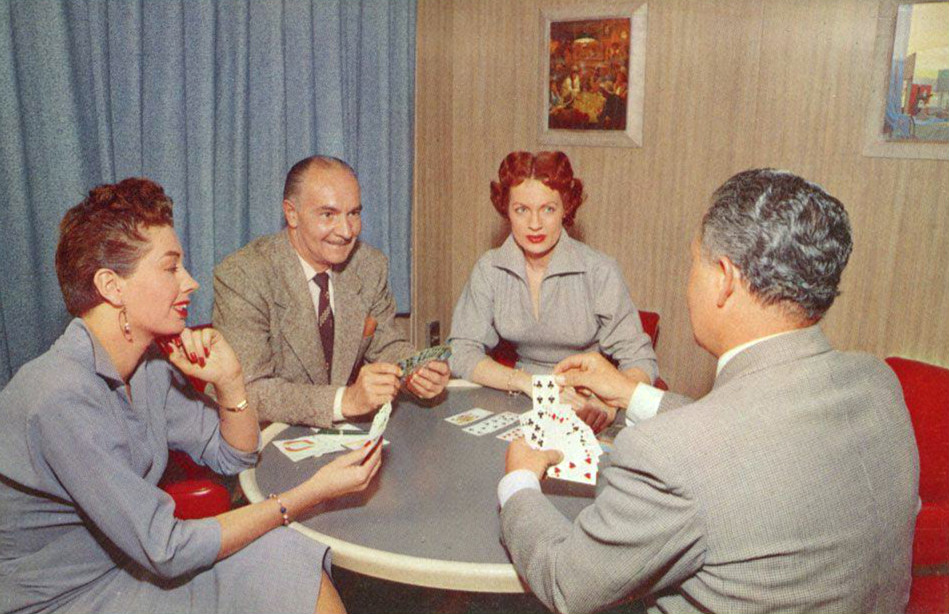
Observation car room for playing cards.

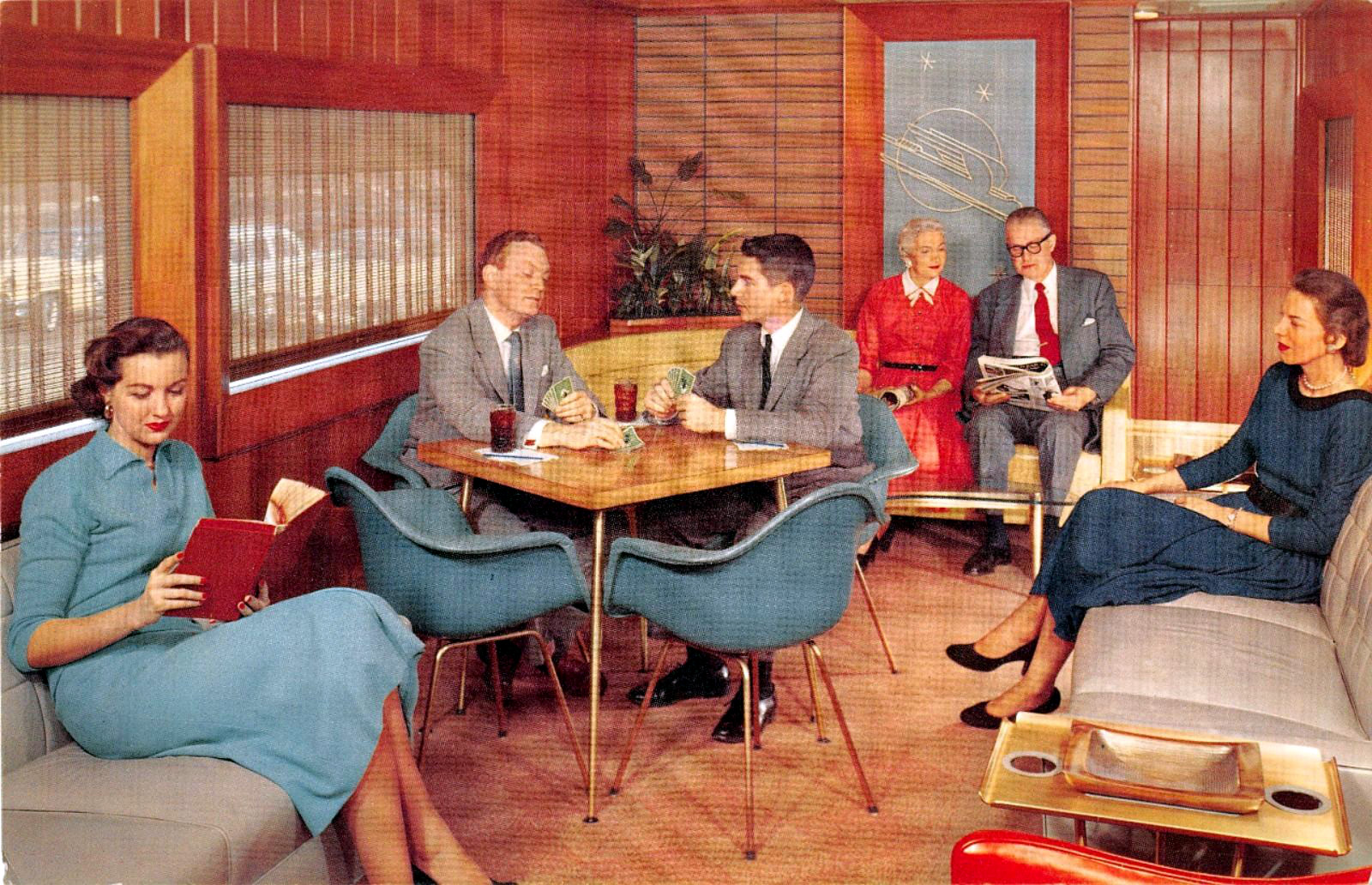
The Redwood Lounge.

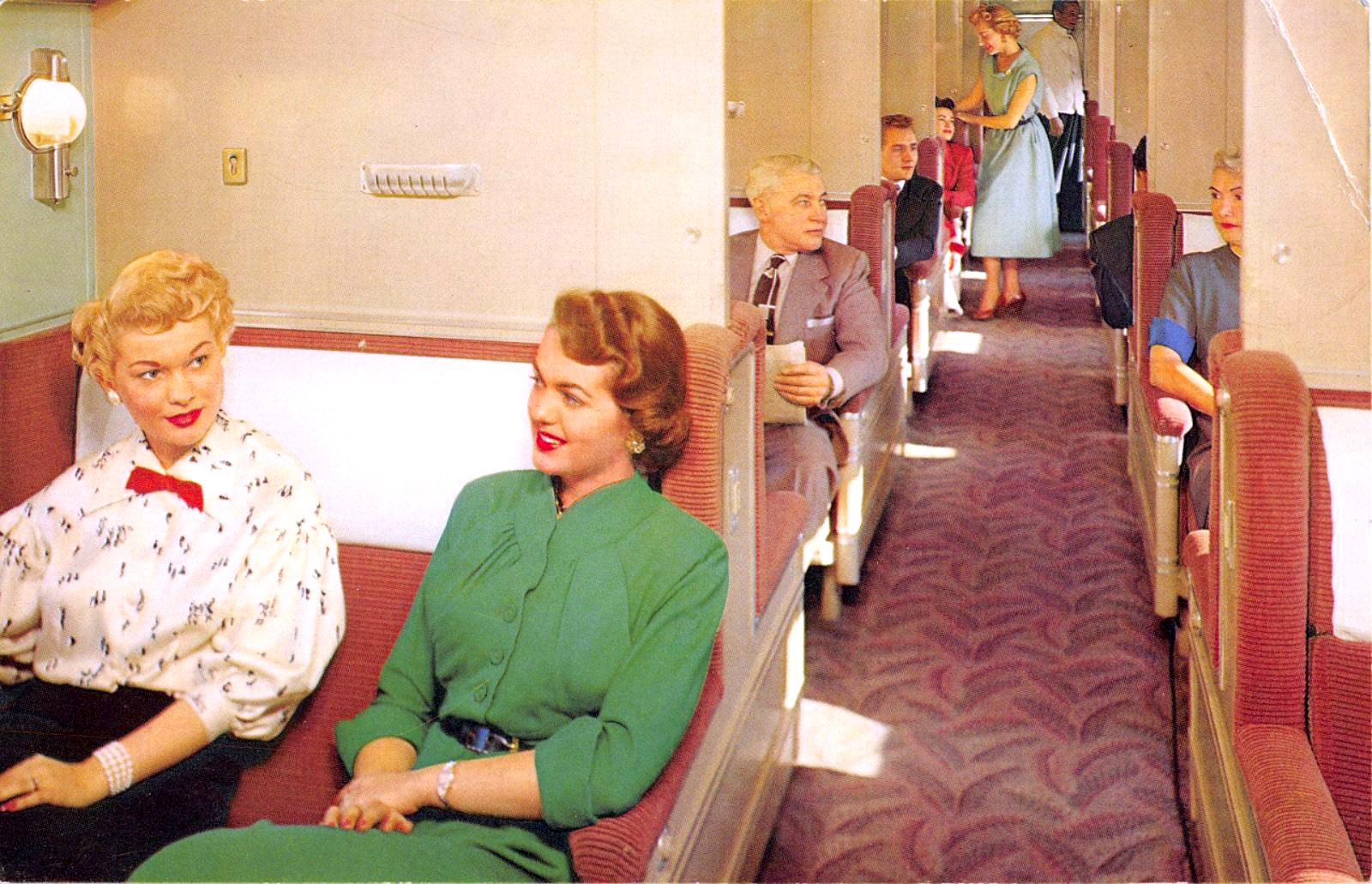
Pullman car in day mode.

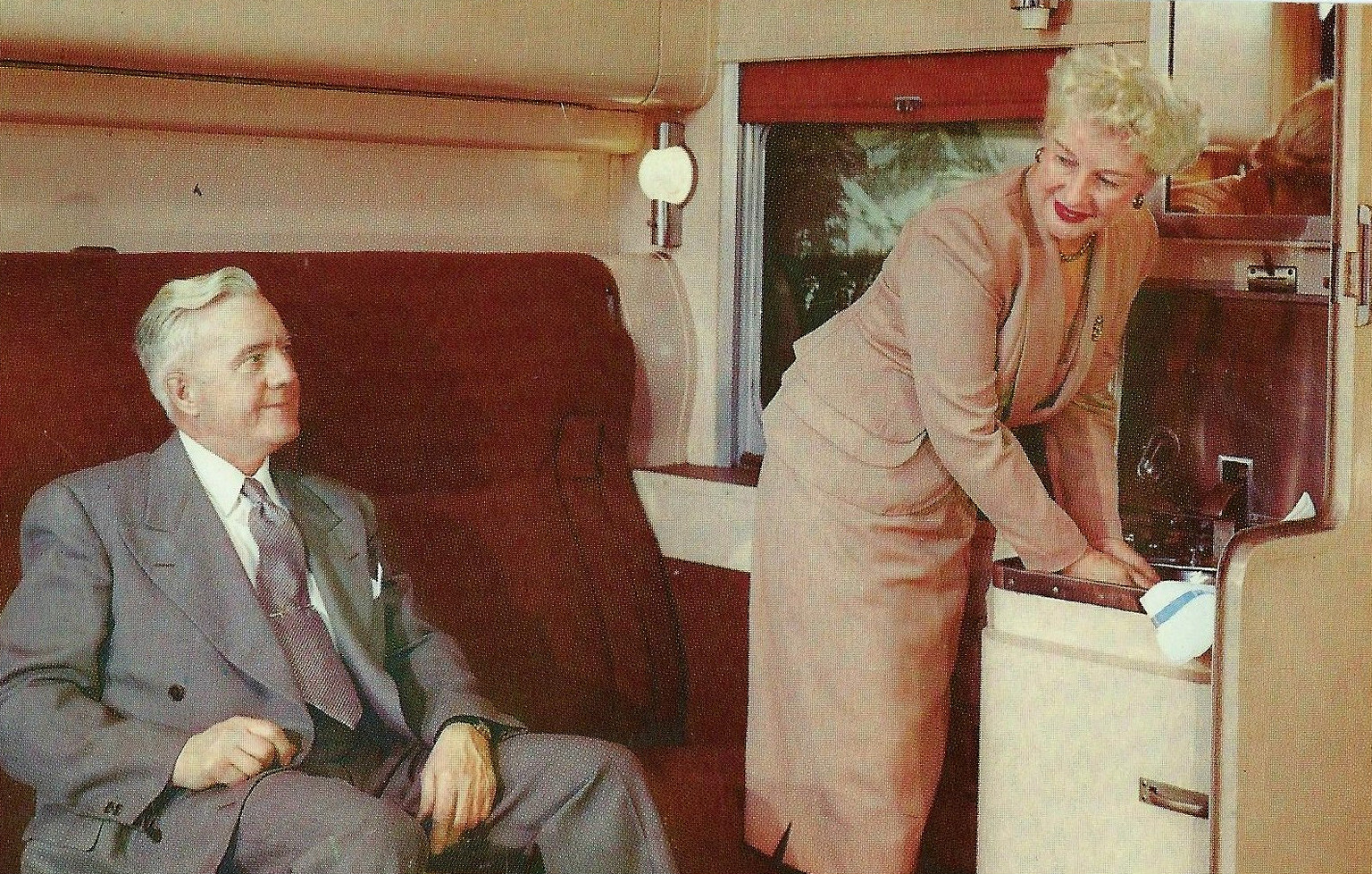
Pullman private compartment.

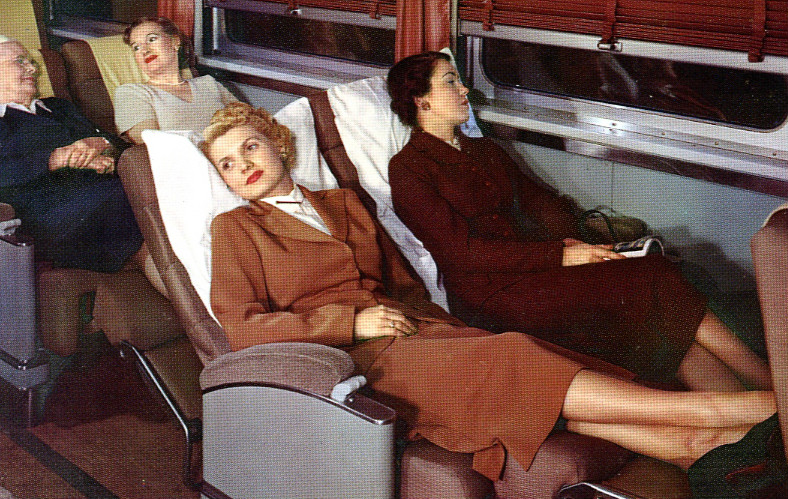
Seating in a coach car.

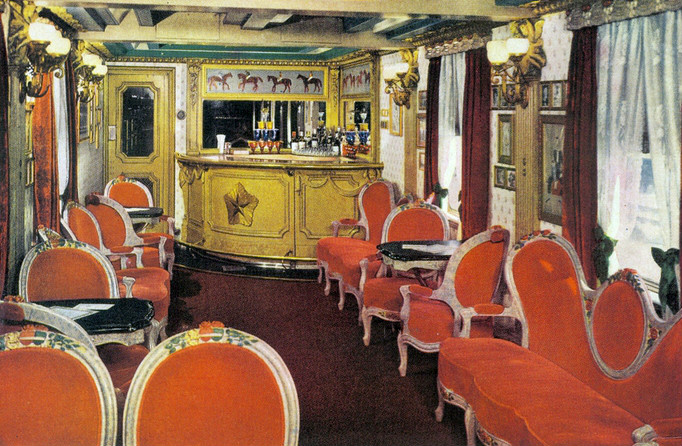
"The Little Nugget"-one of the streamliner's club cars.

== Station stops ==
=== Station stops, 1950 ===
- Chicago, IL (Chicago & North Western)
- Clinton, IA
- Cedar Rapids, IA
- Ames, IA
- Boone, IA
- Omaha, NE (Union Station)
- Fremont, NE (departing passengers only)
- Columbus, NE (departing passengers only)
- Kearney, NE (departing passengers only)
- Grand Island, NE
- North Platte, NE
- Sidney, NE
- Cheyenne, WY
- Laramie, WY
- Rawlins, WY
- Green River, WY
- Evanston, WY
- Ogden, UT
- Salt Lake City, UT
- Milford, UT
- Las Vegas, NV
- San Bernardino, CA
- Riverside, CA
- East Los Angeles, CA
- Los Angeles, CA

== Time Table ==
=== Sample Time Tables, 1947 - 1953 ===
Westbound
Read Down
Condensed Schedules

All trains daily

Eastbound
Read Up
City of Los Angeles
**103**
City of Los Angeles
**104**
Sep. 11, 1949
May, 1950
Sep. 27, 1953
Sep. 27, 1953
May, 1950
Sep. 11, 1949
**7.15**
**7.15**
**7.15**
Lv.
Chicago C.& N.W.
Ar.
10.40 +2
10.40 +2
10.45 +2
3.00 +1
3.00 +1
3.00 +1
Ar.
Omaha C.& N.W.
Lv.
2.50 +2
2.50 +2
2.50 +2
3.10 +1
3.10 +1
3.10 +1
Lv.
Omaha Un. Pac.
Ar.
2.40 +2
2.40 +2
2.40 +2
9.25 +1
9.25 +1
9.25 +1
Ar.
Cheyenne
Lv.
**6.30** +1
**6.30** +1
**6.30** +1

9.35 +1
9.35 +1
9.35 +1
Lv.
Cheyenne
Ar.
**6.20** +1
**6.20** +1
**6.20** +1
**6.20** +1
**6.20** +1
**6.15** +1
Ar.
Ogden
Lv.
9.45 +1
9.45 +1
9.40 +1
**6.30** +1
**6.30** +1
**6.25** +1
Lv.
Ogden
Ar.
9.35 +1
9.35 +1
9.30 +1
**7.10** +1
**7.10** +1
**7.10** +1
Ar.
Salt Lake City
Lv.
8.50 +1
8.50 +1
8.50 +1

**7.20** +1
**7.20** +1
**7.20** +1
Lv.
Salt Lake City
Ar.
8.40 +1
8.40 +1
8.40 +1
9.00 +2
9.00 +2
9.00 +2
Ar.
Los Angeles
Lv.
**5.00**
**5.00**
**5.00**
39 h 45 m
39 h 45 m
39 h 45 m
---Elapsed Time---
39 h 40 m
39 h 40 m
39 h 40 m

Notes:
Bold numbers indicate P.M.
+1 indicates the day after departure
+2 indicates two days after departure

Compare the run time to that of Amtrak's Desert Wind in 1979: Westbound (train 35) 48 hours and 30 minutes. Eastbound (train 36) 48 hours and 00 minutes.

== See also ==
- Passenger train service on the Chicago and North Western Railway
- Passenger train service on the Milwaukee Road
- Passenger train service on the Union Pacific Railroad
