= Texas State Affordable Housing Corporation =

The Texas State Affordable Housing Corporation (TSAHC) is a nonprofit affordable housing provider in Texas.

== Mission ==
According to its website, the organization's mission is to "serve the housing needs of low-income families and other underserved populations in Texas who do not have acceptable housing options through conventional financial channels."

== Organization oversight ==
TSAHC's five-member Board of Directors is appointed by the Governor of Texas. The agency also undergoes reviews by the state of Texas as part of the Texas Sunset Act and will undergo its next Sunset Review in 2027.

Lemuel Williams is Chair of the Board of Directors.

== Programs and services ==
=== Homeownership programs ===
Provides fixed-rate mortgage loans, down payment assistance, and mortgage credit certificates for qualified home buyers. TSAHC also operates the Texas Financial Toolbox consumer website.

Down Payment Assistance programs are all different with certain requirements for each. State or local housing authorities, a non-profit organization, or lender usually set the requirements and conditions for the DPA program. Some programs require you or your loan officer to take a short course on Down Payment Assistance for first time home buyers.

=== Affordable Communities of Texas (ACT) Program ===
A statewide land bank/land trust program. TSAHC acquires foreclosed and vacant properties from financial institutions and partners with local entities to sell or lease them as affordable housing.

=== Texas Housing Impact Fund ===
Provides financing to developers to build or rehabilitate housing for low-income households.

=== Multifamily Private Activity Bond Program ===
TSAHC issues tax-exempt multifamily private activity bonds to finance multifamily rental housing projects that meet one of the following priorities: 1) at-risk preservation and rehabilitation, 2) rural and smaller urban markets, 3) senior and supportive housing developments, or 4) disaster relief housing.

=== Texas Foundations Fund ===
A grant-making program that offers grants to nonprofit organizations to support the following services: 1) critical home repairs, and 2) supportive housing services for households at risk of homelessness.

=== Housing Connection Initiative ===
Provides training to nonprofits that develop affordable housing and provide home buyer and financial education.

== Funding sources ==
TSAHC issues mortgage revenue bonds and other private activity bonds to fund its affordable housing programs. The organization also seeks grants and other private investments from both private contributors and government entities to support programs not funded through private activity bonds.
