= Mortgage revenue bond loan =

A Mortgage Revenue Bond Loan or bond loan is a type of mortgage loan where the cost of borrowing is partially subsidized by a mortgage revenue bond. Although details differ between programs, mortgage revenue bond loan programs are in general designed to lower the cost of homeownership for low to medium income borrowers, sometimes for targeted occupations or neighborhoods. In the United States, mortgage revenue bond loans have supported an average of 100,000 home purchases for low-income buyers between 1986 and 2006. Example mortgage revenue bond loan programs include the Los Angeles Housing Department's mortgage revenue bond program, the Arizona Housing Finance Authority Mortgage Revenue Bond Program, and the Texas State Affordable Housing Corporation Professional Educators Single Family Mortgage Revenue Bond Program.
