= Rancho Cucamonga station =

Commuter rail station in California

Rancho Cucamonga
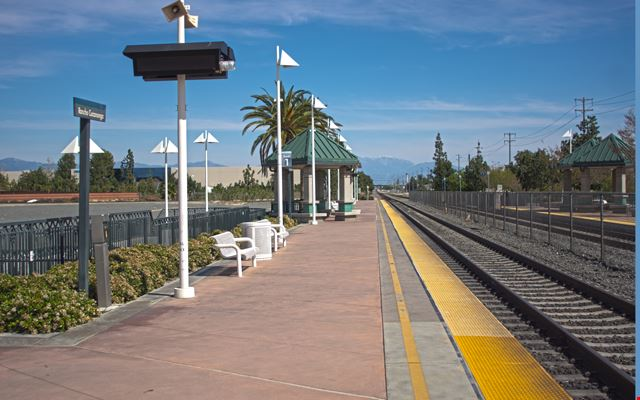
- Rancho Cucamonga station platform

General information
- Location: 11208 Azusa Court; Rancho Cucamonga, California; United States
- Coordinates: 34.0918°N 117.5599°W
- Owner: City of Rancho Cucamonga
- Line: SCRRA San Gabriel Subdivision
- Platforms: 2 side platforms
- Tracks: 2
- Connections: Omnitrans: 82, 380 (ONT Connect); Ontario International Airport (via ONT Connect)

Construction
- Parking: 960 spaces, 24 accessible spaces
- Cycle facilities: Racks, lockers
- Accessible: Yes

History
- Opened: November 1, 1994

Passengers
- FY 2026: 432 (avg. wkdy boardings)

Services
Preceding station	Metrolink	Following station
Upland toward L.A. Union Station	San Bernardino Line	Fontana toward San Bernardino or Redlands
Former services
Preceding station	Metrolink	Following station
Upland toward L.A. Union Station	San Bernardino Line	Auto Club Speedway (race days) toward San Bernardino or Redlands
Future services
Preceding station	Brightline	Following station
Hesperia toward Las Vegas	Brightline West	Terminus
Preceding station	Omnitrans	Following station
Ontario Mills toward Pomona Transit Center	Purple Line	Foothill Bl/Milliken Way toward Victoria Gardens
Location

Rancho Cucamonga station in Rancho Cucamonga, California, serves the Metrolink San Bernardino Line commuter rail. With the under construction Brightline high-speed rail and a potential underground tunnel project to Ontario International Airport, local officials expect increased tourism and economic growth for the Inland Empire. The station is owned by the city of Rancho Cucamonga and is near the former Empire Lakes Golf Course. It is located just west of Milliken Avenue and has 330 parking spaces.

== Current services ==
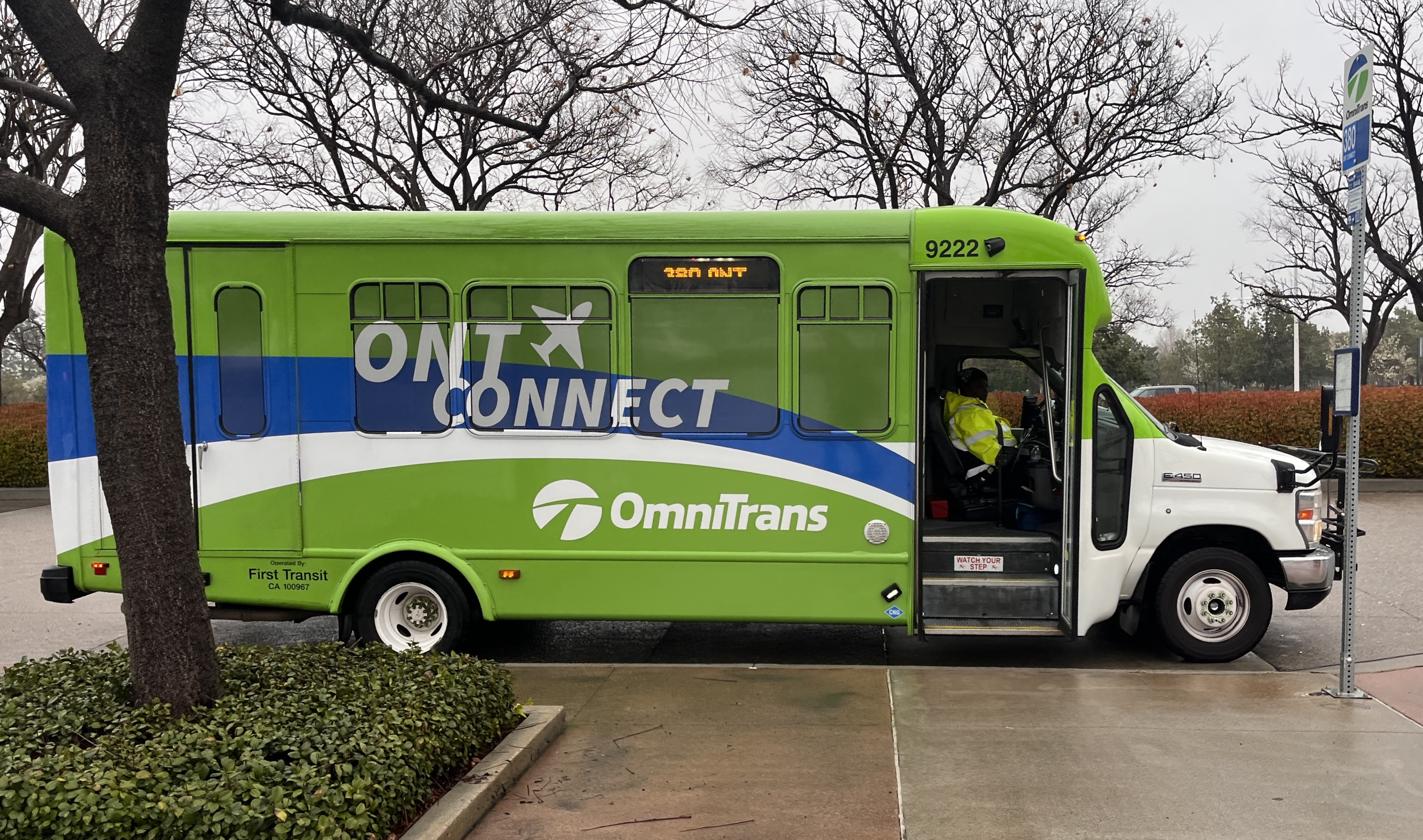
Omnitrans Route 380 (ONT Connect) provides regular bus service to Ontario International Airport from Rancho Cucamonga Station.

Rancho Cucamonga station is served by 32 Metrolink San Bernardino Line trains (16 in each direction) on weekdays, between 4:11 a.m. and 11:01 p.m. Weekend train service is less: 16 trains (8 in each direction) on Saturdays and Sundays, between 7:04 a.m. and 10:52 p.m.

Omnitrans routes 82 and 380 serve a bus loop near the train platform. Route 380, also called ONT Connect, provides non-stop service between the station and Ontario International Airport and meets every train. It operates daily, every 35 to 60 minutes.

== Brightline West ==
Brightline West service is planned at the site. Brightline purchased an adjacent 5-acre (2.0 ha) parcel for the high speed rail station in 2022.

== Future Airport people mover ==
The city is designing this as a multi-modal station as part of a new transit district. A proposed 2.8 miles (4.5 km) underground people-mover would provide a link to the Ontario International Airport.
