= American Orient Express =

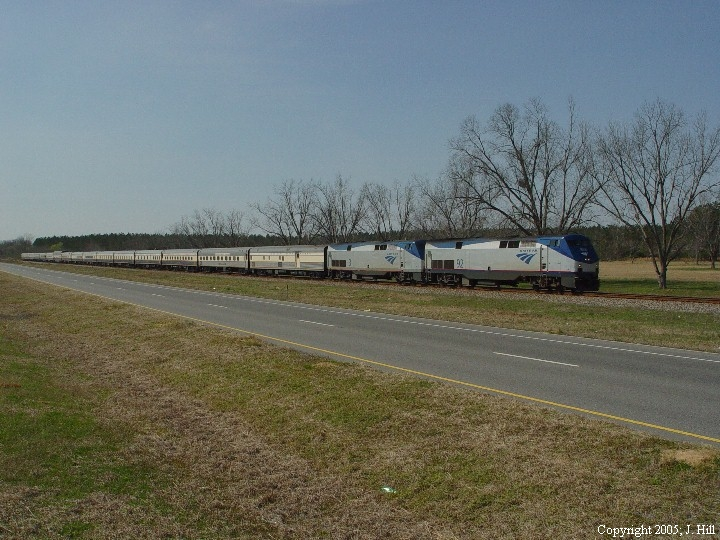
The American Orient Express passes through the countryside west of Butler, GA in April 2005.

The American Orient Express, formerly the American European Express, operated a single luxury passenger train set in charter service between 1989 and 2008 and operated on routes throughout North America. The company was based in Seattle, Washington.

== Background ==
A full dome car was added to the consist in the mid 2000s and offered a panoramic view of the passing landscape. The train was priced from $2,000 to $10,000 per trip one way and included meals, entertainment, and hotel stays. The train operated under contract with Amtrak and used both Amtrak locomotives and crews. It typically ran on freight only routes that had not seen passenger service in more than 50 years. Some of the more popular routes included the Los Angeles–Washington, D.C., transcontinental (taking eight days) and the Rocky Mountain Adventure. Both featured scenic segments with long layovers at certain stops, similar to a cruise ship. The trips were only one way, requiring debarking passengers to either take a bus or airplane to return to their home terminal.

Luxury passenger train excursions, including the AOE, ceased operations during the late 2000s recession. During the final excursions, it was not uncommon for there to be more crew members than passengers on the train. As part of a restructuring, the train was briefly renamed GrandLuxe Journeys with trips primarily running into Mexico. These final trips proved costly and unpopular, and operations were terminated in 2008. Most of the equipment was either sold off or scrapped.

There is no relation between this train and the Venice-Simplon Orient Express or any other Orient Express service.
