= Brightline West =

Future American high-speed rail route

- A map of planned high-speed rail routes in California and Nevada on I-15 corridor. The separate California High-Speed Rail is indicated in black, grey and light grey.

Overview
- Service type: High-speed rail
- Status: Under construction
- Locale: California, Nevada
- Predecessor: Desert Wind
- First service: Late 2029
- Current operator: Brightline
- Website: brightlinewest.com

Route
- Termini: Rancho Cucamonga, California, US; Enterprise, Nevada, US
- Stops: Victor Valley and Hesperia, California, US
- Distance travelled: 218 miles (351 km)
- Average journey time: Approx. 2h 10m

Technical
- Track gauge: 4 ft 8 1/2 in (1,435 mm) standard gauge
- Electrification: Overhead line, 25 kV 60 Hz AC
- Operating speed: Maximum (TBC): 180 or 200 mph (290 or 320 km/h); Average: 101 mph (165 km/h)
- Track owners: DesertXpress Enterprises, LLC (Fortress Investment Group)

Brightline West is a privately run high-speed rail line under construction in California and Nevada. When complete, it will link the Las Vegas Valley and Rancho Cucamonga in Greater Los Angeles through the California High Desert via Interstate 15. The line will connect with existing rail at the Rancho Cucamonga station of Metrolink's San Bernardino Line, a commuter rail line in Southern California. The project is intended to provide an alternative to air and automobile travel between Southern California and Las Vegas, a popular leisure destination. In December 2023, the United States Department of Transportation awarded Brightline West a $3 billion grant as part of the Infrastructure Investment and Jobs Act. Construction, initially expected to begin shortly after the grant was announced in 2023, began on April 22, 2024. Revenue service was planned to start by late 2029. However, as of October 2026, the project is stalled due to funding delays.

The line was developed starting in 2005 as DesertXpress and has passed through several developers and investors. In September 2018, the project known as XpressWest, was acquired by Fortress Investment Group, which owns Brightline in Florida, the only privately run inter-city rail route in the United States. An extension of Brightline West from Victor Valley to the California High-Speed Rail station in Palmdale is also under consideration.

== Context ==
Brightline West will connect Rancho Cucamonga, California, and Las Vegas, Nevada, along Interstate 15, with stops in Hesperia, California, and Victor Valley, California

Las Vegas is a gambling and tourist destination for the Greater Los Angeles area. Interstate 15 is a direct route between the two regions. An estimated 50 million people travel between Los Angeles and Las Vegas annually, with 85% using a car. Travel by automobile takes over four hours while scheduled buses cover the route in five to seven hours. Interstate 15 is an important freight route, so reduced congestion on the route would benefit the supply chain.

The highway carries heavy traffic on Thursday, Friday, and Sunday, which causes significant delays. Motorists returning to Los Angeles on Sunday can create an 18-mile (29 km) backup. Airlines have direct flights, but traffic and security at the airport add time to the short flight. Las Vegas lost its last passenger train service in 1997 when Amtrak canceled the Desert Wind.

== Brightline project ==
In September 2018, Fortress Investment Group, which owns an inter-city rail route in Florida called Brightline, announced that it would acquire the federally approved XpressWest rail corridor project, indicating that it would begin construction of the rail line in the second half of 2020 with expected completion in the second half of 2024. After some delays, groundbreaking began on April 22, 2024 with service expected to start in late 2029. The project is expected to generate around 18,000 jobs at its peak. Los Angeles County finished an environmental assessment for the project in 2016. In October 2019, design plans were almost 30% complete. In September 2020, the line was rebranded to Brightline West, and is being called "a Brightline affiliated company."

=== Funding assistance ===
A high speed line following the Palmdale–Apple Valley–Las Vegas route was included in the 2018 California State Rail Plan as part of the 2040 timeline of projects. Subsequently, the state of California issued tax-exempt, private activity bonds to XpressWest to partially fund construction. These bonds are meant to assist private ventures for the public interest.

In September 2019, it was announced that California would assist the project in funding. In October 2019 California Infrastructure and Economic Development Bank approved $3.25 billion in bonds. In April 2020, California government officials signed off on issuing $600 million in tax-exempt private activity bonds for XpressWest. The state of Nevada allocated the company an additional $200 million in private activity bonds in July 2020.

Cofounder and co-CEO of Fortress, Wes Edens, estimated the cost of construction at $8 billion in 2020. In September 2020, up to $3.2 billion in the tax-exempt, private activity bonds were offered. In November, it was decided to let the rights for the sale of the bonds lapse. A bond sale was planned for 2021 but was moved to 2022 to allow continued progress on project planning and for the bonds to be more attractive to investors.

Los Angeles Metro is considering re-programming around $2 billion in Measure M funding slated for the High Desert Corridor, a proposed freeway between Victorville and Palmdale, canceled in October 2019, to instead create a development plan for an extension of the XpressWest route between the two cities.

In February 2023, the company applied for $3.75 billion in funding from Infrastructure Investment and Jobs Act. A bipartisan congressional group from Nevada and California wrote a letter in April 2023 in support of the funding. In December 2023, the United States Department of Transportation awarded Brightline West $3 billion of the grant request and in September 2024 signed it. In January 2024, Brightline West received $2.5 billion of private activity bonds from the US Department of Transportation in addition to $1 billion given in 2020. The remainder of the cost (estimated at $12 billion as of April 2024) is expected to be privately financed.

Due to rising costs of labor force and materials, the company requested a $6 billion loan from the U.S. Department of Transportation. The costs are now estimated to be $21.5 billion.

=== Rancho Cucamonga extension ===
The company initiated planning on a rail line over the Cajon Pass to Rancho Cucamonga in June 2020. The Infrastructure Investment and Jobs Act passed in November 2021 has billions of dollars for rail projects which provides expanded opportunities for companies such as Brightline. In January 2022, the Federal Transportation Department's Federal Rail Administration began reviewing the 49-mile segment (79 km) that would allow speeds of up to 180 miles per hour (290 km/h).

The environmental report for the Rancho Cucamonga route was released in October 2022. The environmental report includes the location of the proposed intermediate station in Hesperia. The report notes some mitigation measures will be necessary: temporary impacts on noise and wetlands, temporary and permanent impacts on some threatened or endangered species, visual impacts on views in the San Gabriel and San Bernardino Mountains, and traffic impacts around stations in Hesperia and Rancho Cucamonga. The report concludes that the project "will not result in a significant impact on the environment" or have "disproportionately high and adverse impacts" on low-income or minority populations. The environmental permit was approved in July 2023.

The San Bernardino County Transportation Authority was awarded a $25-million grant in July 2023 from the Rebuilding American Infrastructure with Sustainability and Equity (RAISE) program to fund design and construction costs of the stations in Hesperia and Apple Valley.

=== Construction ===
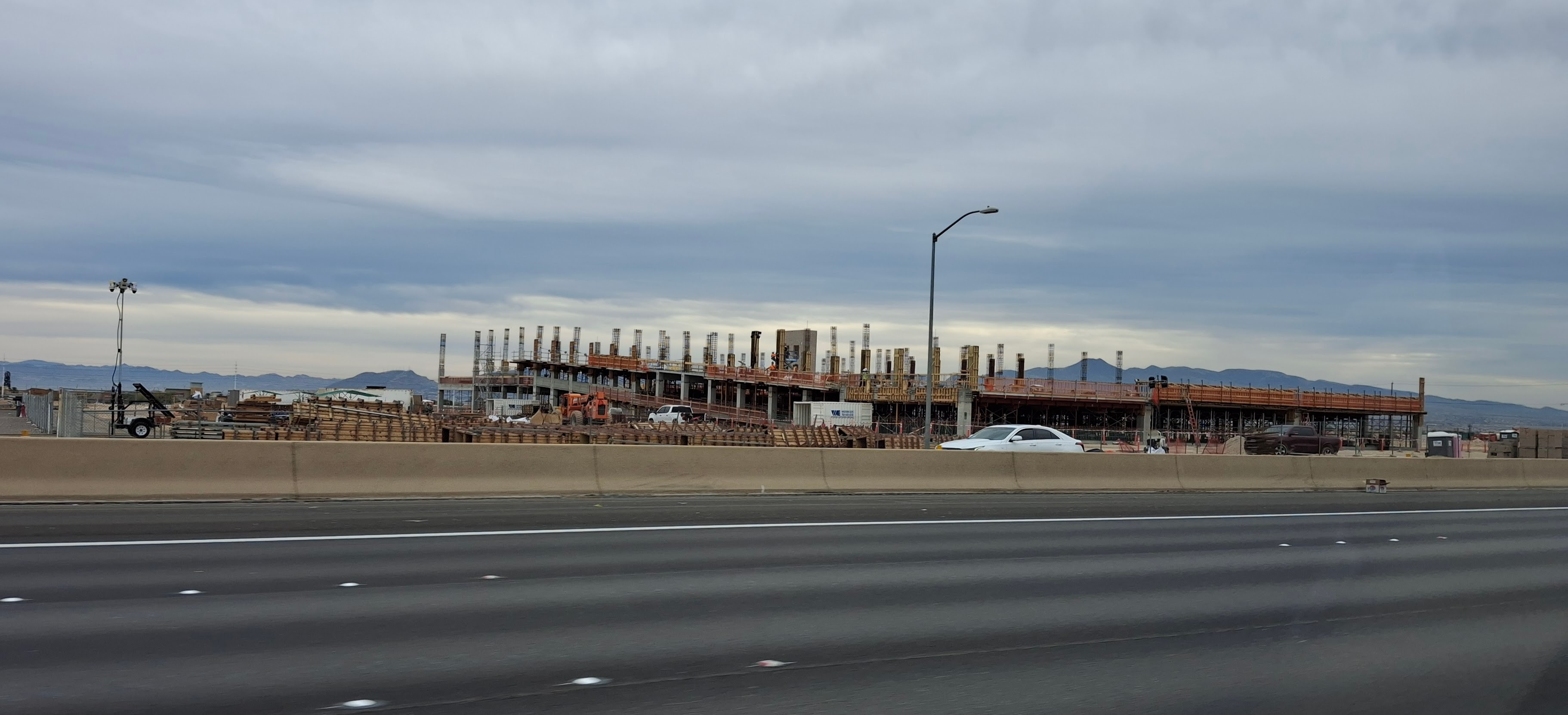
Las Vegas station parking garage construction along I-15 in late 2025

Preparatory work involving ground surveys in the right of way of Interstate 15 and recruitment of up to 11,000 workers began in January 2024. A groundbreaking ceremony was held on April 22, 2024, at the planned Las Vegas station site, marking the official start of construction. Heavy construction was scheduled to begin in early 2025, with the Nevada DOT saying work could start in April 2025. However, as of October 2025, the major construction for the rail line is expected to begin in April 2026. To oversee this critical phase, former CEO Michael Reininger transitioned to a new role in January 2026 as Managing Director dedicated exclusively to the delivery of the brightline West project.

The company originally aimed to have the line operational for the 2028 Summer Olympics in Los Angeles. However, as of April 2025, officials now anticipate the line will begin service September 2029, too late for the Olympics. In January 2026, updated financial disclosure revealed that the estimated cost of the project had risen to $21.5 billion.

Since the groundbreaking, field investigations and early-site activities has advanced throughout both Nevada and California. By mid-2025, Brightline West crews were performing geotechnical borings, utility potholing, and survey operations along the Interstate 15 corridor, including bridge-potholing work near the I-15/SR-210 interchange in Rancho Cucamonga. In California's High Desert, crews expanded operations through Victor Valley and Hesperia, conducting soil sampling and drainage surveys. Field work continued to intensify into early 2026, focusing on the I-15 median preparation.

In North Las Vegas, PCM Railone announced construction of a US $20 million concrete-tie production facility dedicated to the Brightline West project, with tie shipments were expected to begin in late 2025. According to updated planning documents, main civil works, including embankment grading, drainage, and bridge pier construction, were scheduled to accelerate through 2025-2026, with fully heavy-construction activity beginning by early 2026. However, as of October 2026, heavy construction along the route has not begun, and work on the Las Vegas station is stalled, all due to funding delays.

== Route ==
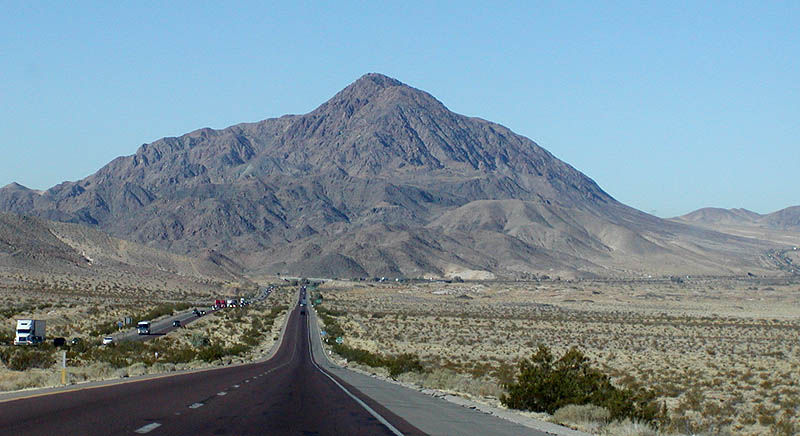

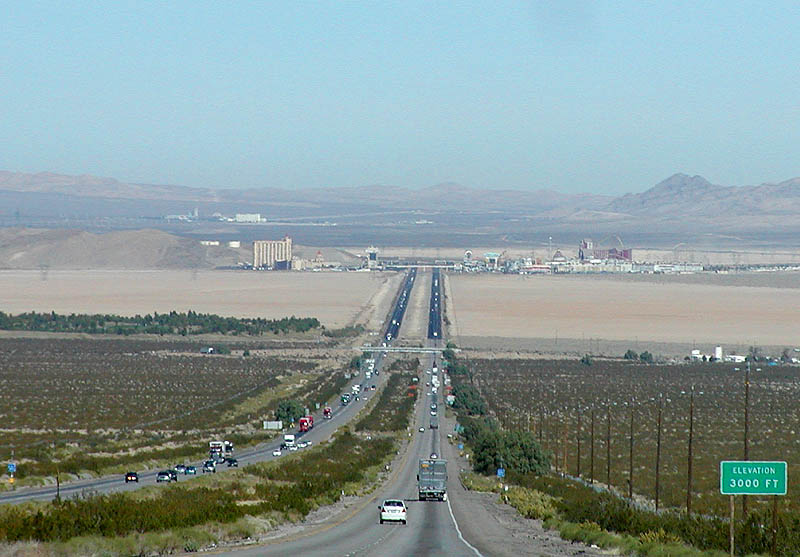
Interstate 15 approaching Cave Mountain, California (above) and in the Ivanpah Valley, Nevada (below). The line is planned to run in the highway median strip for most of its length.

The tracks are planned to be laid in the median of Interstate 15, aside from a short section connecting to Rancho Cucamonga and a section on the east side of the highway approaching the Las Vegas station. Sections will pass through federal land controlled by the Bureau of Land Management and the National Park Service. While plans at first called for a fully double-track railway along the route, Brightline intends initially to build the project as a mostly single-track route with passing sidings, partly because additional sections were moved to the highway median where space is more limited.

In the original plan, the route did not extend into Los Angeles due to the high cost of building rail in urban areas. The 50-mile (80 km) extension from Victor Valley to the city of Palmdale, where it would connect to the California High-Speed Rail system currently in development, in order to provide service to Los Angeles, was not included in the initial phase. In June 2012, the new plan included the link between Victor Valley and Palmdale as part of construction for the first phase of the project. Passengers would transfer to Metrolink to access the Los Angeles area.

In June 2020, the company initiated planning on a rail line south of Apple Valley over the Cajon Pass to Rancho Cucamonga to provide more direct Los Angeles service, while not ruling out the Palmdale expansion. The details of other sections have not been announced. Later phases may include extensions to Phoenix, Arizona; Salt Lake City, Utah; or Denver, Colorado.

In 2009, XpressWest estimated that it would carry around five million round trip passengers in the first full year of operation, with the company charging fares of around $50 for a one-way trip between Victorville and Las Vegas. In 2012, the round-trip fare was planned to be around $89 (equivalent to $125 in 2025), with trains expected to run every 20 minutes on peak, and up to every 12 minutes as demand requires. As of 2020, the stated frequency is 45 minutes between departures.

In 2023, Brightline West relocated more sections of the route into the median of I-15. The Victor Valley station was reconfigured to have passenger platforms in the highway median. The vehicle maintenance facility was moved from the Victor Valley site to a 246-acre parcel (100 ha) west of I-15 in Sloan, Nevada, and will connect to the Union Pacific mainline at this location.

=== Stations ===
The Las Vegas station will be south of the Las Vegas Strip on Las Vegas Boulevard in Enterprise. The 110-acre site (45 ha) is across from the Premium Outlets South mall. The two-story station will feature retail and restaurant space. The Las Vegas station on Las Vegas Boulevard was announced in 2020. The land was acquired in July 2021. In April 2023, renderings of the Las Vegas station were released.

Victor Valley station will be in the northeast portion of the town of Apple Valley, adjacent to I-15 at Dale Evans Parkway. Passenger platforms will be in the median of I-15 and accessed via walkway under the northbound lanes of the highway.

A station in Hesperia will be built in the median of I-15 at the Joshua Street exit. Trains will make limited stops here in the morning and evening.

The line will continue into the Greater Los Angeles area, terminating at Rancho Cucamonga Metrolink station. Service to a planned transit center incorporating the station will operate under the jurisdiction of the San Bernardino County Transportation Authority (SBCTA). SBCTA and the city of Rancho Cucamonga approved the sale of a 5-acre parcel (2.0 ha) to Brightline for the high speed rail station in 2022. A proposed 2.8 miles (4.5 km) underground people-mover would provide a link to the Ontario International Airport. Omnitrans currently offers direct bus service to the airport from this station.

=== High Desert Corridor ===
The High Desert Corridor along with current and planned future rail connections in Southern California.

The High Desert Corridor is a proposed high-speed rail connection between Brightline West and California High-Speed Rail. It will connect Victor Valley station and Palmdale station. At Palmdale, passengers can connect to the existing Metrolink service or continue into Los Angeles using California High-Speed Rail's tracks.

=== Right-of-way agreements ===
In June 2020, the company entered into an agreement to lease the state-owned Interstate 15 right-of-way between Las Vegas and Victor Valley from Caltrans. The 50-year lease is in the amount of $842,000 per year starting in 2020, adjusted according to the consumer price index every three years. A similar agreement for the Apple Valley to Rancho Cucamonga segment was signed in March 2023.

Brightline entered into a memorandum of understanding (MOU) with the San Bernardino County Transportation Authority in 2020 for the spur between Apple Valley to Rancho Cucamonga, as it provided connectivity within the Inland Empire. Metrolink also approved a MOU to study the links to the Rancho Cucamonga and Palmdale Metrolink stations. A MOU was signed in October 2021 with the California State Transportation Agency (CalSTA), Caltrans, and California High-Speed Rail Authority, for the use of 48 miles (77 km) within Interstate 15 to Rancho Cucamonga.

=== Environmental impact ===
The Brightline West project underwent detailed federal and state environmental reviews led by the Federal Railroad Administration (FRA) and Caltrans. The final Environmental Impact Statement (EIS) was approved in July 2023, determining that the rail line would not cause significant adverse impacts with appropriate mitigation measures.

=== Wildlife crossings ===
A 6-foot-high concrete barrier will keep vehicles away from the rail line along the center divider of Interstate 15. This will prevent animals from making what is already a dangerous crossing of the freeway. Desert bighorn sheep once thrived in these mountain ranges, though they now face many challenges. Wildlife researchers determined that wildlife crossings at Soda, Cady and Clark mountains could help sustain the sheep and other wildlife.

Under an agreement with Caltrans and the California Department of Fish and Wildlife, wildlife crossings will cross over the freeway and the rail line at the three proposed locations. Hundreds of existing culverts and crossings under the Interstate will be maintained or improved. Fencing to protect the desert tortoise and to exclude wildlife will be restored or installed as part of the project.

Brightline West has also pledged to offset its construction-related emission through pilot programs using battery-electric machinery and solar-powered construction offices.

== Rolling stock ==
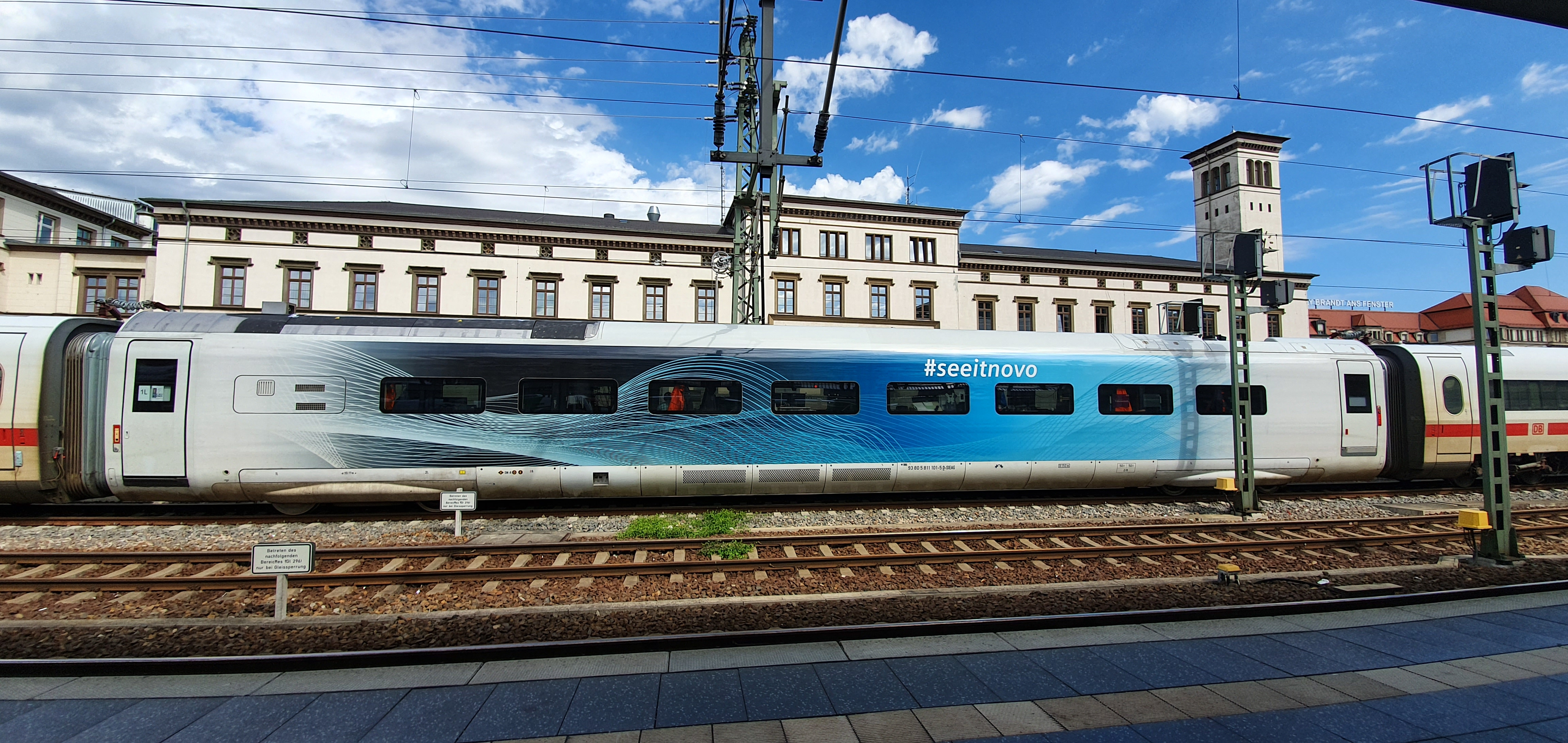
Prototype car of Siemens Velaro Novo high speed train, similar to platform proposed for Brightline West

Vehicles will require a high power-to-weight ratio to climb steep grades on the planned route – up to 4.5% between Victorville and Las Vegas, and up to 6% through Cajon Pass.

Brightline was in active discussion until mid-2024 with Alstom and Siemens Mobility to procure rolling stock for the service and for potential future routes. In May 2024, Siemens announced that Brightline had selected them as the preferred train vendor for Brightline West service. The initial order consists of 10 seven-car American Pioneer 220 trainsets, with a capacity of 434–450 passengers.

The service plans to use the American Pioneer 220, an American variant of the Siemens Velaro Novo high-speed electric multiple unit. Brightline would be the first customer of the Siemens Velaro Novo platform, which has been tested in Germany using the ICE-S train, and has a designed top speed of 225 mph (360 km/h).

The service will use up to 25 train pairs, traveling up to 200 miles per hour (320 km/h), at 45 minute intervals.

The Siemens rolling stock will be assembled at a new factory in Horseheads, New York.

In 2025, Siemens Mobility began detailed work on the American Pioneer 220 trainsets, incorporating energy-efficient systems and interior layouts customized for the Las Vegas-Southern California corridor. Each train will feature two service classes, onboard Wi-Fi, touchless ticketing, and dedicated accessibility areas. Siemens confirmed that the units will meet full Buy America standards, with the majority of components produced domestically, including traction systems and bogies manufactured in Sacramento, California.

The Horseheads facility, which opened in late 2024, will serve as Siemens Mobility's North American high-speed rail assembly hub, producing Brightline West's carshells, final train integration, and testing before delivery to Nevada for commissioning. Siemens has indicated that the first completed trainset is expected to roll out by late 2027, allowing for testing and certification ahead of the planned 2029 service launch.

== Impacts ==
Oak View Group plans a 20,000-seat arena on a 25-acre (10 ha) site adjacent to the Las Vegas station. This project is part of a larger 66-acre (27 ha) development envisioned as a sports and entertainment district. According to Tim Leiweke, CEO of Oak View Group, this is a prime location for future growth in Las Vegas' gaming and entertainment corridor.

PCM Railone AG announced in June 2024 that they would build a production facility for concrete ties and open a North American headquarters in North Las Vegas.

== Early project development ==
=== DesertXpress ===
The original plan under the name DesertXpress was to provide an alternative to automobile travel and airline travel between the Los Angeles area and the Las Vegas area along Interstate 15. The city of Victorville was selected as the location for the westernmost terminal, as extending the train line farther into the Los Angeles Basin through the Cajon Pass was considered to be prohibitively expensive. The station would include free parking and through-checking of baggage straight to the Las Vegas Strip resorts. A future extension would have included a new link to the California High-Speed Rail station in Palmdale.

DesertXpress Enterprises, LLC was founded in 2005 to develop, construct, own and operate the high-speed rail project. 70% of the company was held by Anthony A. Marnell II of Marnell Corrao Associates through his DX, LLC company. Gary Tharaldson and François Badeau held 20 and 10%, respectively. In 2006, the preparation of a first Federal Railroad Administration-Environmental Impact Statement (EIS) was started.

The total cost of the link between Apple Valley and Las Vegas was expected to be around US$5 billion. In March 2010, project planners said they could obtain the full funding amount through exclusively private investors, but had also applied for a $4.9 billion loan through the federal Railroad Rehabilitation & Improvement Financing program. As of October 2011, the start of the project was contingent on receiving a $6 billion loan from the federal government, the approval or denial of which was expected in mid-2012.

A preferred design was identified with the release of the Final Environmental Impact Statement in April 2011, which began a public comment period that ended in May 2011. The federal government approved the design in July 2011. The planned route was approved by the Surface Transportation Board in October 2011. The trains were to be self-propelled, all electric multiple unit (EMU) trains with maximum speed of 150 mph (240 km/h).

The train would travel at speeds of up to 150 mph (240 km/h) averaging 130 mph (210 km/h) and making the 186 mi (299 km) trip from Victorville to Las Vegas in about 1 hour 24 minutes. In March 2010, executives with the project said they expected construction to begin in 2010. In October 2011, construction was planned to begin in the last quarter of 2012, with completion in the last quarter of 2016, subject to funding.

=== Transformation to XpressWest ===
In June 2012, the developer announced a new plan to build a network of high-speed rail for the region by expanding to Arizona, Utah and Colorado. The initial phase was to include high-speed tracks, Las Vegas to Apple Valley and Apple Valley to Palmdale.

The 185-mile (298 km) link between Las Vegas and Victorville was designed to be double-tracked which is dedicated for the high-speed trains. The costs of this section was estimated at $6.9 billion. The developer would put up $1.4 billion in private investment and the rest of funding would borrowed under the Railroad Rehabilitation and Improvement Financing program provided by the Federal Railroad Administration.

Future plans include a link between Las Vegas and Phoenix, Arizona, and another from Las Vegas to Salt Lake City, Utah, and Denver, Colorado. The project was rebranded to XpressWest to reflect the expanded mission.

DesertXpress Enterprises signed a document with Los Angeles County Metropolitan Transportation Authority officials in June 2012 to explore the plan to build a 50-mile (80 km) high-speed rail link between Victor Valley and Palmdale. The link would initially connect to the Metrolink system in Palmdale. This would allow passengers to complete a train ride between Los Angeles and Las Vegas with one transfer, by using Metrolink in the Los Angeles area and a transfer to the high-speed train at Palmdale station. The station would eventually connect with California High-Speed Rail, and is designed to have the same specifications and technology, allowing it to continue on California High-Speed Rail further into Burbank and Los Angeles. The early estimate of the costs for this link was $1.5 billion. and the earliest environmental work was to be completed by the end of 2013. The date of the service for this link has not been determined.

=== Joint venture ===
In February 2013, the federal loan remained unapproved and construction was not expected to start until mid-2014 at the earliest.

Representative Paul Ryan (R-WI), the chairman of the House Budget Committee and senator Jeff Sessions (R-AL), the ranking minority member of the Senate Committee on the Budget were the main opponents to the federal loan application of XpressWest. They argued that the project represented high risk to the taxpayer. They wrote to then-Transportation Secretary Ray LaHood in March 2013 and recommended the administration to reject the loan application. The letter indicated that the total cost was estimated to be $6.9 billion. The $1.4 billion would come from the private sources and the remaining $5.5 billion would come from the federal loan. The letter cited a taxpayer risk analysis report as a basis of their recommendation.

In July 2013, there were reports that loan was indefinitely suspended, which were later confirmed by the federal government, which said that it had been suspended in part due to the failure of the application in regard to the "Buy America" policy, which required applicants to use American-made products. Despite the indefinite suspension of the federal loan application, which was viewed as a denial of the application, the developer indicated that the XpressWest project would proceed without providing the details on financial plan.

In 2014, U.S. Nevada Senator Harry Reid mentioned that the federal loan request may resurface, but little had been seen so far of the project's continued viability. In 2015, the Nevada High-Speed Rail Authority was proposed to look into the feasibility of high-speed rail into southern Nevada from California, possibly XpressWest. The bill was introduced in April 2015, and was passed by the legislature in May 2015, by a vote of 40–1. It was approved by the Governor in May 2015.

In September 2015, XpressWest and the newly formed China Railway International USA, a consortium of Chinese rail industry companies, announced a joint venture to design, build, and operate the service between Las Vegas and Palmdale, with construction planned to begin in September 2016. A CAHSRA spokesperson said that there have been ongoing discussions concerning allowing the trains to use California High-Speed Rail lines to go further into the Los Angeles area, although no commitments had been made.

In June 2016, XpressWest announced that the joint venture had been called off. The biggest reason cited for the termination of the joint venture was a federal regulation requiring the manufacture of the high speed trains inside the United States. XpressWest said that they are "undeterred by this development and remains dedicated to completing its high-speed passenger rail project."

== See also ==
- California-Nevada Interstate Maglev, a proposed maglev from Anaheim, California, to Las Vegas
- Z-Train
- Las Vegas Railway Express
- Texas Central Railway, a proposed Shinkansen (bullet train) route that will link the Dallas–Fort Worth metroplex with Houston
