= Las Vegas Limited =

Short-lived passenger train in 1976

Overview
- Service type: Inter-city rail
- Status: Discontinued
- Locale: California and Nevada
- Predecessor: City of Los Angeles
- First service: May 21, 1976
- Last service: August 6, 1976
- Successor: Desert Wind
- Former operator(s): Amtrak

Route
- Termini: Los Angeles, California; Las Vegas, Nevada
- Stops: 4
- Distance travelled: 324 miles (521 km)
- Average journey time: 7 hours 25 minutes
- Service frequency: Weekly
- Train number(s): 781/782

On-board services
- Class(es): Reserved coach
- Catering facilities: Full diner and on-board lounge

Technical
- Track gauge: 4 ft 8 1/2 in (1,435 mm)

The Las Vegas Limited was a short-lived weekend-only passenger train operated by Amtrak between Los Angeles, California, and Las Vegas, Nevada. It was the last in series of excursion trains run by Amtrak between 1972–1976 serving the Los Angeles–Las Vegas market. Low patronage led to the train's withdrawal after three months. Amtrak returned to the Las Vegas market in 1979 with the Desert Wind, a daily train between Los Angeles and Ogden, Utah.

== History ==
=== Background ===
The railroad arrived in Las Vegas in 1905 with the opening of the San Pedro, Los Angeles and Salt Lake Railroad between Salt Lake City and Los Angeles. Senator William A. Clark of Montana controlled the railroad from its founding in 1901 to 1921, when he sold his interest to the Union Pacific Railroad. This placed Las Vegas on the Union Pacific's main Los Angeles–Chicago route, and some of the UP's most famous trains served it, including the Challenger, Los Angeles Limited, and above all the City of Los Angeles.

By 1970 this service was reduced to a combined City of Los Angeles/Challenger, which itself was combined with the City of Denver, City of Kansas City, City of Portland, and City of San Francisco on the Overland Route. This combined train earned the derisive sobriquet "City of Everywhere"; Amtrak's incorporators retained only the City of San Francisco for Amtrak's initial route structure. Intercity passenger service to Las Vegas ended on May 1, 1971, as Amtrak took over most private sector service.

=== Fun trains ===
Amtrak first restored service to Las Vegas on February 4, 1972, with the Las Vegas Fun Train, also known as the Crapshooters Express. This was more an excursion train than regular intercity service, running on the weekends only and then only for the winter season. Amtrak modeled the train on the Reno Fun Train, which made weekend trips from the San Francisco Bay Area to Reno, Nevada during the winter season. Begun under the Southern Pacific Railroad in 1963, it had continued under Amtrak and was doing good business. The trips were sponsored by the Las Vegas Chamber of Commerce, which agreed to cover any losses sustained by Amtrak. Las Vegas mayor Oran K. Gragson was aboard for the first seven-hour trip from Los Angeles to Las Vegas. The inaugural train featured live music and poker games, in addition to a generous supply of alcohol. In Las Vegas the train stopped in a rail yard opposite the Union Plaza Hotel, which had opened in 1971. The train ran for three months, from February to May. For the first two months the train departed Los Angeles on Friday and returned on Sunday; on March 26 it switched to Sunday–Tuesday in an attempt to drum up weekday business in Las Vegas, with mixed results.

Another excursion train began running on September 20, 1974. Dubbed the Las Vegas Celebrity Train, it was sponsored by Las Vegas Charter Service. Unlike the Fun Train it made up to three trips a week, departing Los Angeles on Friday, Sunday, and Wednesday. This was possible because it used idle equipment from Amtrak's thrice-weekly Los Angeles–New Orleans Sunset Limited. Comedian Milton Berle was aboard for the first trip; celebrities slated to travel aboard future trips included Debbie Reynolds, Donald O'Connor, Wilt Chamberlain, Dana Andrews, Parnelli Jones, and Leslie Uggams. The service ended on April 27, 1975.

=== Las Vegas Limited ===
In many respects the Las Vegas Limited was another iteration of the old Fun Train. Early publicity billed it as such, and it operated on the old Friday out/Sunday return schedule. Nevada agreed to fund half the losses, but contracted with a firm, Iron Horse Inc., for marketing and promotion. The firm would be responsible for paying the state's share of the losses, if any. Package deals were available with eleven hotels. Again, Amtrak used old equipment temporarily surplus from other assignments. (Note: According to Craig Sanders the equipment was displaced from the San Diegan when that train received new Amfleet coaches. Pacific News reported that at least some of the equipment was drawn from the Reno Fun Train, which had stopped running for the season.)

The primary difference was that the train received official numbers (eastbound No. 782, westbound No. 781) and was listed in Amtrak's official timetable. It was the only one of the 1970s Los Angeles–Las Vegas trains so distinguished. Furthermore, no official end date was announced. The first train ran on Friday, May 21, 1976. Patronage did not meet expectations, and the state withdrew its support. The last train ran on August 6. Amtrak blamed inadequate publicity. Iron Horse Inc. lost $70,000–$80,000.

== Equipment ==
September 20, 1974
- Train: Las Vegas Celebrity Train
- EMD SDP40F No. 502; EMD SDP40F No. 558; Lunch counter diner No. 8101; Hi-Level transition coach No. 9929; Hi-Level coach No. 9948; Hi-Level coach No. 9954; Hi-Level coach No. 9964; Hi-Level transition coach No. 9927; Ex-UP lounge No. 5000 Sun Valley; Lunch counter diner-dormitory No. 8118; Ex-NP lounge-observation No. 392 Hulham

The various Las Vegas excursion trains ran during Amtrak's "Rainbow Era", with old inherited equipment from various private railroads mixed together. Although Amtrak began receiving new Amfleet coaches in 1975, they were not employed on the Las Vegas Limited. For its first few weeks of operation the Las Vegas Fun Train ran with eight coaches, two lounges, two dining cars, and a baggage car which was retrofitted into a dance hall. Four of the coaches were parlor cars. The Las Vegas Celebrity Train used idled equipment from the Sunset Limited plus several leased private cars. For the inaugural run this included a lunch counter dining car, several Hi-Level coaches, a lounge car, a dining car, and a lounge-observation car. The equipment of the Las Vegas Limited was similar to the original Fun Train: a diner, lounge and coaches.
