= Las Vegas Railway Express =

Former American rail transport company

- Trade name: X-Train
- Traded as: OTCQB: MAPT
- Industry: Rail transportation
- Headquarters: Enterprise, Nevada
- Area served: Southwestern United States
- Key people: Joseph Cosio-Barron, CEO; Michael Barron, Former President and CEO (during X-Train era)

Las Vegas Railway Express, branded as "X Train," was an American rail transport company that planned to operate passenger rail service between Southern California and Las Vegas, Nevada. In May 2017, the Las Vegas Railway Express sold its operation and branding to X Rail Entertainment. In October 2018, the Las Vegas Railway Express proposed to change its name to United Rail Inc. In November 2018, the company chose First Transit Group to operate the train, but as of August 2019, the company was in talks with Amtrak to operate the train. In 2020, the company purchased the assets of Geocommand Software and rebranded as "Maptelligent, Inc." Its next SEC filing described its business as providing location data for emergency responders, with no mention of the railway as an ongoing concern.

== Company ==
Led by Michael Barron, an entrepreneur largely involved in real estate, the company was formed in January 2010 from a combination of two previous ventures, one working in promotional merchandising and one involved in buying defaulted mortgages. It began to promote the idea of new rail service from California to Las Vegas as early as March 2009. The company originally planned for service to begin in mid-2011, but at the time, the company was not close to establishing operating agreements with Amtrak, BNSF Railway and Union Pacific Railroad, all of which operate trackage along the planned route from Los Angeles Union Station to Las Vegas.

In March 2012, the state of Nevada issued final approval for the service to operate, and in May, the company began issuing stock; by September, only $2.3 million out of an estimated $35 million in start-up costs had been raised by stock sales. In November, LVRE signed an agreement with Union Pacific allowing trains to operate over UP trackage from Daggett, California, to Las Vegas. According to the terms of the agreement, LVRE was to pay UP $56 million for track improvements, including additional capacity and relocating UP facilities in Las Vegas. As of the end of November, LVRE had yet to sign its operating agreement with Amtrak, which also was to include LVRE's rights to travel on BNSF trackage. By the end of November 2012, the company had spent about $12 million, with a further public offering of stock planned to raise the $100 million more necessary to begin operations.

In January 2013, LVRE announced that it had selected Orlando, Florida-based company Rail Enterprises, Inc. to refurbish rolling stock, including upgrading interiors, mechanical systems and furnishings. It still planned to begin service to Las Vegas in early 2014.

In November 2013, the company said that, due to an undisclosed "off balance sheet financing" agreement, it had terminated its operating agreement with Union Pacific, which would have required LVRE to have paid UP $66 million for track improvements before the UP would allow passenger service on its track.

In December 2013, the company announced its intention to begin seeking public-private partnerships to operate upscale passenger train service on routes around the country. It said that deliveries of its refurbished passenger cars would begin later in the month.

In October 2014, the LVRE said that it had begun engineering a new route between Los Angeles and Las Vegas, through Mojave and Barstow, California, which would avoid the congested rail crossing of the Cajon Pass.

By 2020, the company moved on to other, unrelated ventures.

== Service proposals ==
Originally, the service was planned to operate five days a week between downtown Los Angeles and Las Vegas, making a daily round trip Thursday through Monday, with an increase to forty trips weekly planned for five years after the start of operations. The X Train would have started in Los Angeles and used existing railroad tracks with “the possibility of utilizing the San Bernardino Santa Fe Depot as an origination point for operations,” according to presentation documents with the San Bernardino County Transportation Authority. Initially, the train was proposed to run as a conventional service along Union Pacific and BNSF-owned lines, hiring Amtrak to haul their private rail cars, while construction took place to convert sections of the route to high-speed. The increase in speed was claimed to reduce the trip from 4.5 hours by conventional rail to around 3.5 hours. The proposed double-tracking for high speed rail would have been built between Yermo and Las Vegas. A 500-room upscale hotel, dubbed “The X Hotel,” was proposed to be built above the Las Vegas train station in the final phase of the project. The final official proposed schedule was a round trip that departs Friday and returns Sunday. The service was expected to begin in September 2019. However the train was believed to start in July 2020 as an Amtrak train; it was later scheduled to start in 2023. It did not begin service and the company extinguished debts related to the train project as part of its transition into mapping.

=== Rolling stock ===
By November 2012, the company had purchased twelve passenger cars from unidentified sellers, with refurbishment expected to begin by the end of the year, though this was later pushed back to an undetermined date in early 2013. Rebuilding work was planned to take place in Las Vegas at a cost of about $1 million per car. By the time operations were intended to begin, the railroad's trainset were intended to consist of sixteen passenger cars, pulled by three EMD F59PH locomotives. Twelve cars would have been first-class passenger cars, with amenities including assigned seating, televisions and a bar area. There would also be several dedicated lounge cars and a service car with crew quarters and additional supplies.

== See also ==
- Desert Wind, an Amtrak train that operated between Los Angeles and Las Vegas, and on to Utah.
- Brightline West, a proposed high-speed rail service between Victorville, California and Las Vegas.
