= Desert Wind =

Former Amtrak long-distance rail service

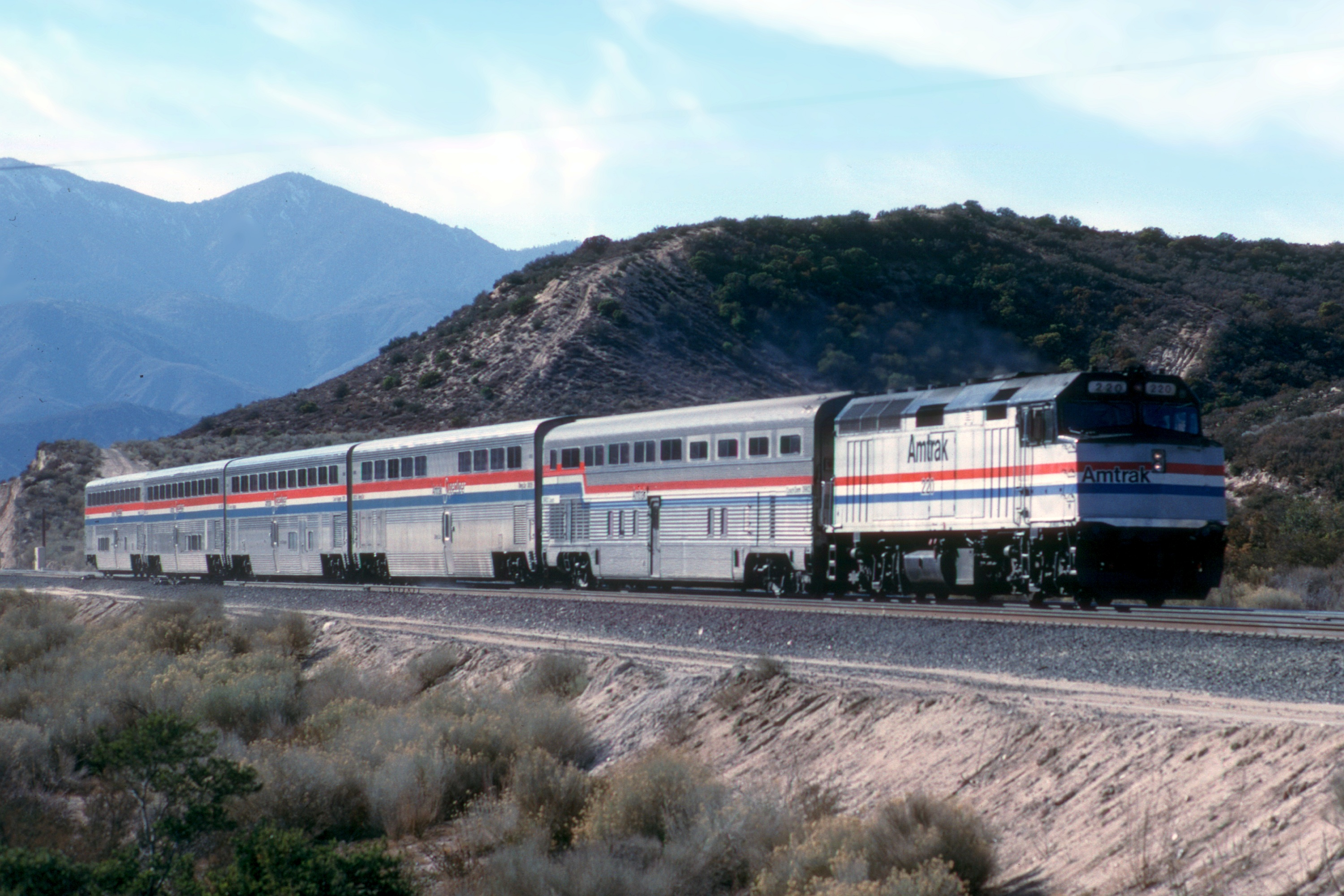
- The Desert Wind in the Cajon Pass in 1991

Overview
- Service type: Inter-city rail
- Status: Discontinued
- Locale: Western United States
- Predecessor: Las Vegas Limited
- First service: October 28, 1979
- Last service: May 10, 1997
- Former operator: Amtrak

Route
- Termini: Chicago, Illinois; Los Angeles, California
- Distance travelled: 2,397 miles (3,858 km)
- Average journey time: 48 hours 30 minutes
- Service frequency: Three days per week
- Train number: 35, 36

On-board services
- Classes: First class (sleepers); Reserved coach
- Sleeping arrangements: Bedrooms; Roomettes
- Catering facilities: Dining car; On-board cafe
- Observation facilities: Sightseer lounge

Technical
- Rolling stock: Superliners
- Track gauge: 4 ft 8 1/2 in (1,435 mm)

The Desert Wind was an Amtrak long-distance passenger train that ran from 1979 to 1997. It operated from Chicago to Los Angeles as a section of the California Zephyr, serving Los Angeles via Denver, Salt Lake City, and Las Vegas.

== History ==
UP #932, an EMD E8, leading the City of Los Angeles into Union Station in Los Angeles in March 1971, just prior to discontinuation

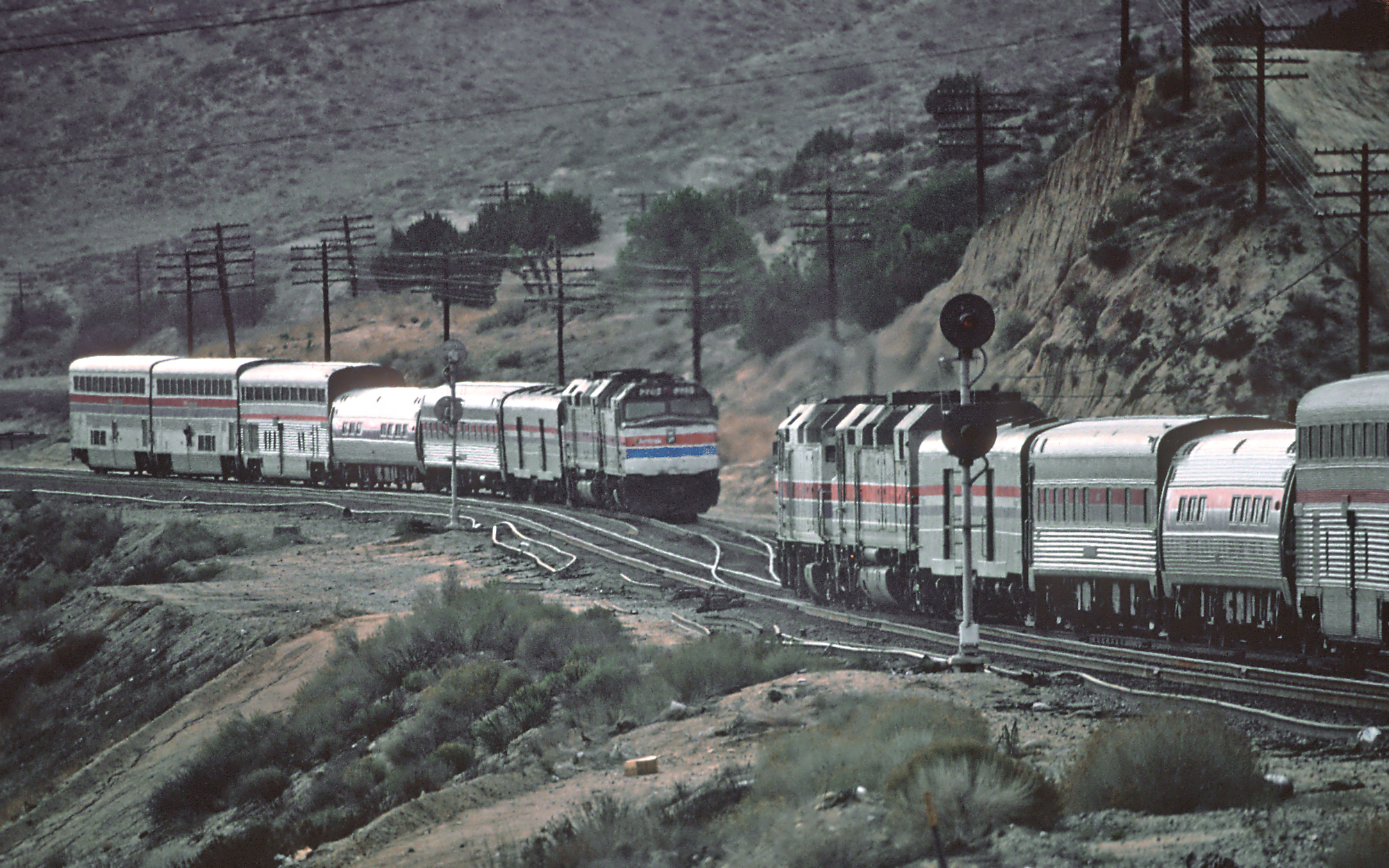
Two Desert Wind trains meet on the east side of Cajon Pass in 1981

In the late 1960s, prior to the creation of Amtrak, the Union Pacific Railroad combined its long-distance streamliners between Chicago, Kansas City, and the West Coast into a single massive train dubbed by critics the "City of Everywhere". This train included the Challenger, the City of Denver, the City of Kansas City, the City of Los Angeles, the City of Portland, and the City of San Francisco. At one point, it ran up to 27 cars. The City of Los Angeles separated at Ogden, Utah, to serve Los Angeles via Las Vegas. Of these, Amtrak retained portions of the City of Kansas City and the City of San Francisco for its Chicago – San Francisco service, which it named the San Francisco Zephyr. Regular service to Las Vegas ended in the early morning hours of May 2, 1971, when the westbound City of Los Angeles made its last station stop on its final trip to its namesake city.

Throughout the 1970s, there were brief attempts to revive service to Las Vegas in the form of charters and excursions, plus one regularly scheduled weekend-only train called the Las Vegas Limited, which ran for four months in 1976. Matters came to a head in 1979, as Amtrak faced significant political pressure to cut costs and reduce the size of its national network. Senator Howard Cannon (D-Nevada) pushed Amtrak hard to create a train which served Las Vegas, and Amtrak considered replacing the Southwest Limited, its existing Chicago – Los Angeles train, with such a service. In the end, the Southwest Limited remained and Amtrak introduced the Desert Wind, which made its first run on October 28, 1979.

The original Desert Wind was a day train with Amfleet equipment. The northbound train left Los Angeles mid-day and arrived in Ogden the following morning to connect with the eastbound San Francisco Zephyr. The southbound departed Ogden in the middle of the night after the arrival of the westbound San Francisco Zephyr from Chicago and arrived in Los Angeles in late afternoon. The 811-mile (1,305 km) journey took eighteen hours. Beginning in 1980, the Desert Wind exchanged a Chicago – Los Angeles through coach with the San Francisco Zephyr at Ogden; this service expanded in 1982 to include a sleeping car.

Caliente, Nevada, was added to the timetable on October 25, 1981, while Delta, Utah, was added April 24, 1983.

After the renamed and rerouted California Zephyr began using the Denver and Rio Grande Western Railroad main line in 1983, the Desert Wind began connecting with the Zephyr at Salt Lake City. Later, the Desert Wind and the Seattle-bound Pioneer would operate together with the California Zephyr from Chicago to Salt Lake City, where the trains separated. This created a train of 16 Superliner cars running from Chicago to Utah, the longest that Amtrak had ever operated aside from the Auto Train. With Amtrak needing at least four locomotives to pull this massive train through the Rockies, the Pioneer began splitting off at Denver in 1991, while the Desert Wind continued to split from the Zephyr at Salt Lake City.

In May 1997, the Desert Wind and Pioneer were discontinued as part of Amtrak's recurring budget cuts. Train service was replaced with a Los Angeles – Las Vegas Amtrak Thruway service. At that time, rail service between Los Angeles and Las Vegas took 7 hours 15 minutes.

=== Proposed restoration ===
There are several private, competing plans to restore rail service from Los Angeles to Las Vegas, including the high-speed Brightline West and the more conventional X Train and Z-Train.

A Los Angeles – Las Vegas route run by Amtrak nearly entered service in 2000. A Talgo VII trainset was bought for the service in 1999; when it was not implemented, the trainset was later used on the Amtrak Cascades service.

Also, as of 2011, new routes were being considered, including routes using the same track as the original Desert Wind, and routes using the Metrolink San Bernardino Line. Lack of funding and congestion through the Cajon Pass remained significant obstacles. More recent proposals using high-speed rail have suggested routing through Victorville and connecting with California's high-speed rail project in Palmdale, assuming the California project can secure funding for a connection from Bakersfield to Los Angeles.

The route has some merit for Amtrak, as the July 2010 issue of Trains listed the route as one to be restored in conjunction with upgrading the equipment on the California Zephyr. In 2021, Amtrak announced a Los Angeles to Las Vegas train service as part of a new expansion proposal.

In June 2021, Senator Jon Tester (D-Montana) added an amendment to the Surface Transportation Investment Act of 2021 which requires the Department of Transportation (not Amtrak itself) to evaluate the restoration of discontinued long-distance routes, such as the Desert Wind. The bill passed the Senate Commerce Committee with bipartisan support, and was later rolled into President Biden's Infrastructure Investment and Jobs Act (IIJA), which was passed into law in November 2021. The report must be delivered to Congress within two years. The law also provides $2.4 billion in new funds to Amtrak's long-distance route network.

On October 28, 2022, the FRA announced the beginning of the Amtrak Daily Long-Distance Service Study as required by the IIJA. Its purpose is to evaluate the restoration and addition of discontinued and new long-distance passenger services, as well as the upgrading of tri-weekly long-distance services (the Sunset Limited and the Cardinal) to daily operation. The criteria for either restoring or creating new long-distance routes are that they connect large and small communities as part of a "regional rail network", provide economic and social well-being for rural areas, provide "enhanced connectivity" for the existing long-distance passenger trains, and reflect the support and engagement of the locals and region for restored long-distance passenger service. These criteria include the Desert Wind, among other trains. The study will take place through 2023, and will engage with stakeholders, the rail companies, and communities as it evaluates "how to better connect people with long-distance rail services".

== See also ==
- North Coast Hiawatha
