= Las Vegas station (Brightline West) =

Station in Nevada for high-speed rail line

Las Vegas
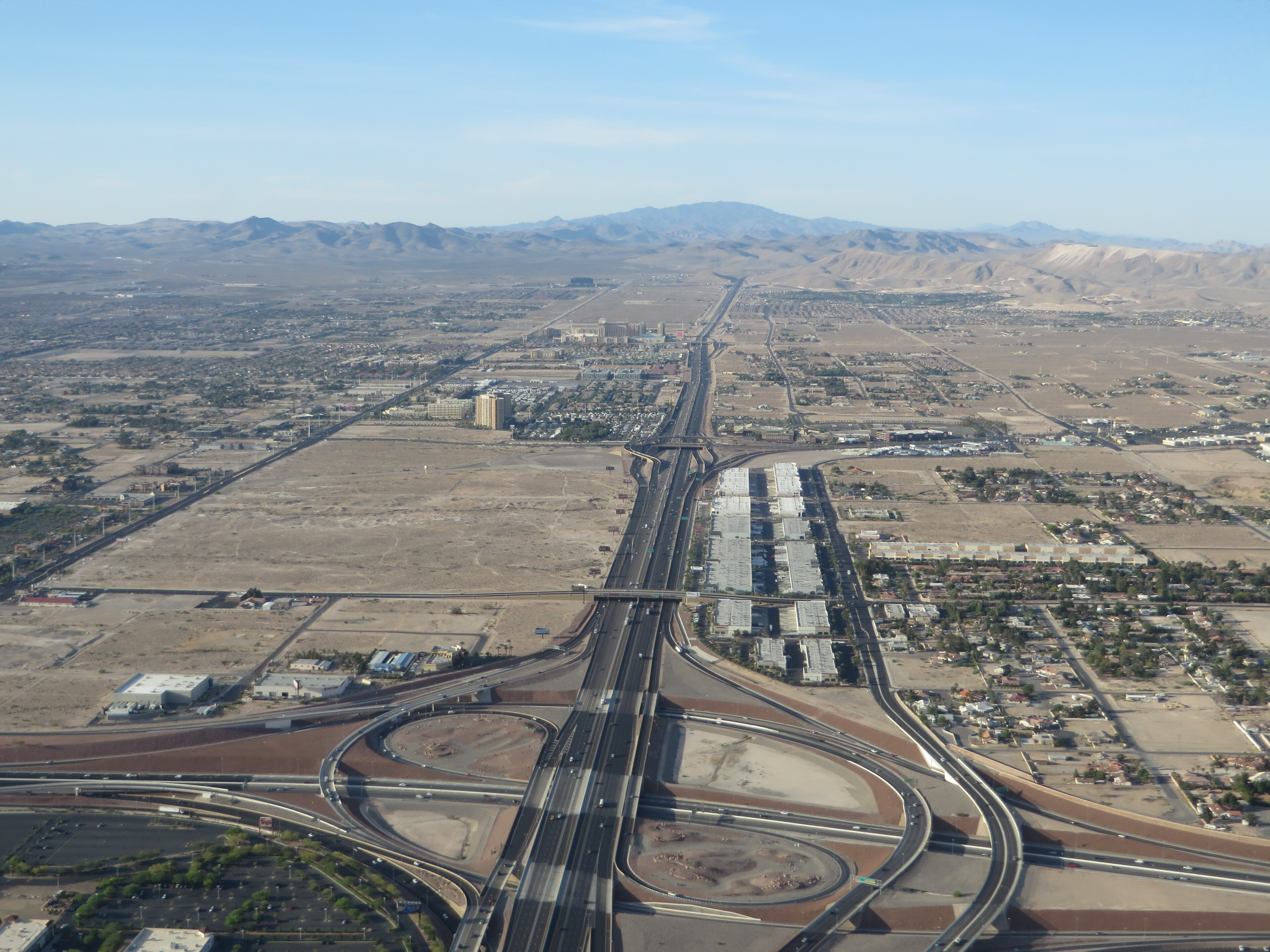
- Aerial view looking south from Sunset Road, the station site is the open parcel left of center frame, May 2014

General information
- Location: Las Vegas Boulevard; Enterprise, Nevada; United States
- Coordinates: 36°03′16″N 115°10′40″W
- Owner: DesertXpress Enterprises, LLC
- Operator: Brightline West
- Line: Brightline West

Construction
- Parking: 2,400 spaces
- Accessible: Yes

History
- Opening: 2029

Future service
Preceding station	Brightline	Following station
Terminus	Brightline West	Victor Valley toward Rancho Cucamonga
Location

Las Vegas station is the planned northern terminus of Brightline West, a proposed high-speed rail service. The station will be located on the south Las Vegas Strip in the unincorporated town of Enterprise, Nevada. The 33-acre (13 ha) site will feature retail, restaurants, connections to other transportation (including the Vegas Loop), and a large parking garage. Construction began on April 22, 2024, with rail operations planned to start in 2029.

== Description ==
The two-story station will be situated on a 33-acre (13 ha) site on the west side of Las Vegas Boulevard, between Blue Diamond Road and Warm Springs Road, across from the Las Vegas Premium Outlets South. Work began on the station in mid 2025.

== Entertainment district ==
The surrounding 110 acres (45 ha) provide space for transit-oriented development. According to Tim Leiweke, CEO of Oak View Group, this is a prime location for future growth in Las Vegas's gaming and entertainment corridor.

Oak View Group plans a 20,000-seat arena on a 25-acre (10 ha) site adjacent to the station. This project is part of a larger 66-acre (27 ha) development envisioned as a sports and entertainment district.

Wes Edens, cofounder of Fortress Investment Group and Brightline founder, had originally expressed interest in having a Major League Soccer team based in Las Vegas as an expansion along with a soccer-specific stadium adjacent to the station. The stadium could have a capacity of at least 25,000 spectators and have the potential team name of the Las Vegas Villains.

=== Previous site considerations ===
The 2011 project outline explored options near the Rio or Downtown. One of these locations was ultimately used for Allegiant Stadium.
