= Private activity bond =

In general, a private activity bond is a bond issued by or on behalf of a state government (or one of its subdivisions) for the purpose of financing the project of a private user.

== Application within the United States ==
Section 141(a) of the Internal Revenue Code provides that the term private activity bond means any bond issued as part of an issue which meets:

(1) the private business use test of section 141(b)(1) and the private security or payment test of section 141(b)(2), or

(2) the private loan financing test of § 141(c).

Under Treasury Regulation section 1.141-2, an interest on a private activity bond is not excludable from gross income under section 103(a) of the Internal Revenue Code unless the bond is a qualified bond. Interest from private activity bonds became subject to the Alternative Minimum Tax after the Tax Reform Act of 1986. All things equal, yields on private activity bonds are higher due to this tax treatment.
