= Museum of the American Railroad =

Railroad museum in Frisco, Texas, U.S.

Coordinates: 33.144513°N 96.833444°W

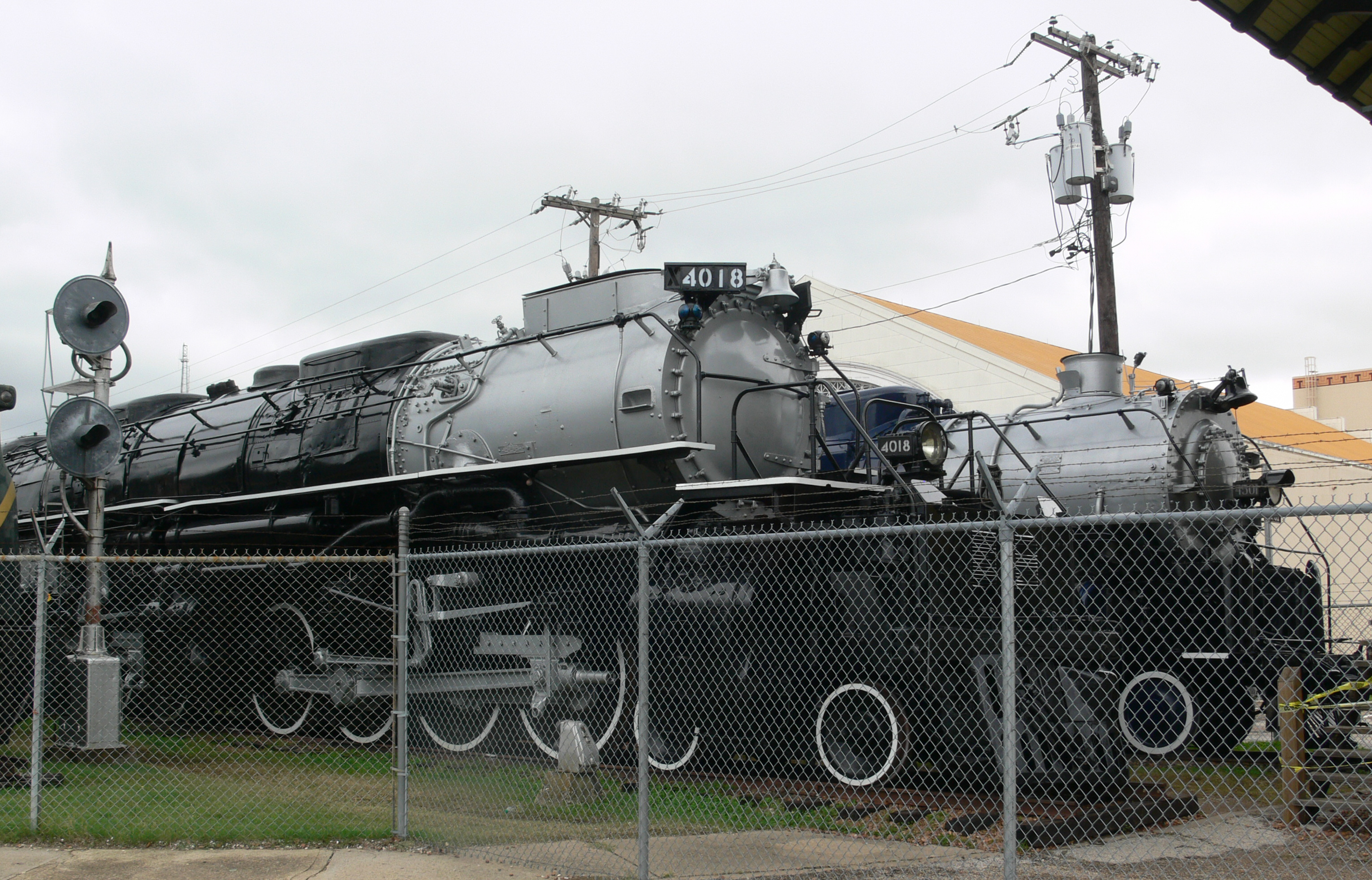
- 4018 and 4501 sit on display at the Museum of the American Railroad
- Former name: Southwest Railroad Historical Society, Age Of Steam Railway Museum
- Established: 1963
- Location: Frisco, Texas, United States
- Type: 501(C) Not For Profit
- Collections: Railway Rolling Stock and Historic Railroad Buildings
- President: Bob LaPrelle
- CEO: Bob LaPrelle
- Public transit access: Frisco Shuttle Busses
- Parking: Frisco Discovery Center
- Website: www.historictrains.org

The Museum of the American Railroad, formerly known as the Age of Steam Railroad Museum, is a railroad museum in Frisco, Texas. The museum has more than 70 pieces of steam, diesel, passenger, and freight railroad equipment sitting on 15 acres making it one of the largest historic rail collections in the US. Guests may walk through some of the equipment on guided tours.

== History ==
The museum began as a small exhibit at Fair Park in 1963, and continued as a staple of the annual State Fair of Texas. It officially became a museum in 1986, remaining at its original site until November 2011. The museum has fully moved to Frisco, Texas; the move was based on a strategic plan, called Visions 2006, which called for a comprehensive reorganization of the museum, including new facilities, new governance and new programs. The museum's offices and some exhibits are temporarily housed at the Frisco Heritage Museum while construction continues on the museum's new location two blocks south.

TrainTopia, a G scale model train layout, opened in July 2018 in the Frisco Discovery Center next to the museum's site. An additional O-scale layout is being reassembled. As of May 20th, 2025, the museum is working on construction of a new events pavilion.

== Collection ==
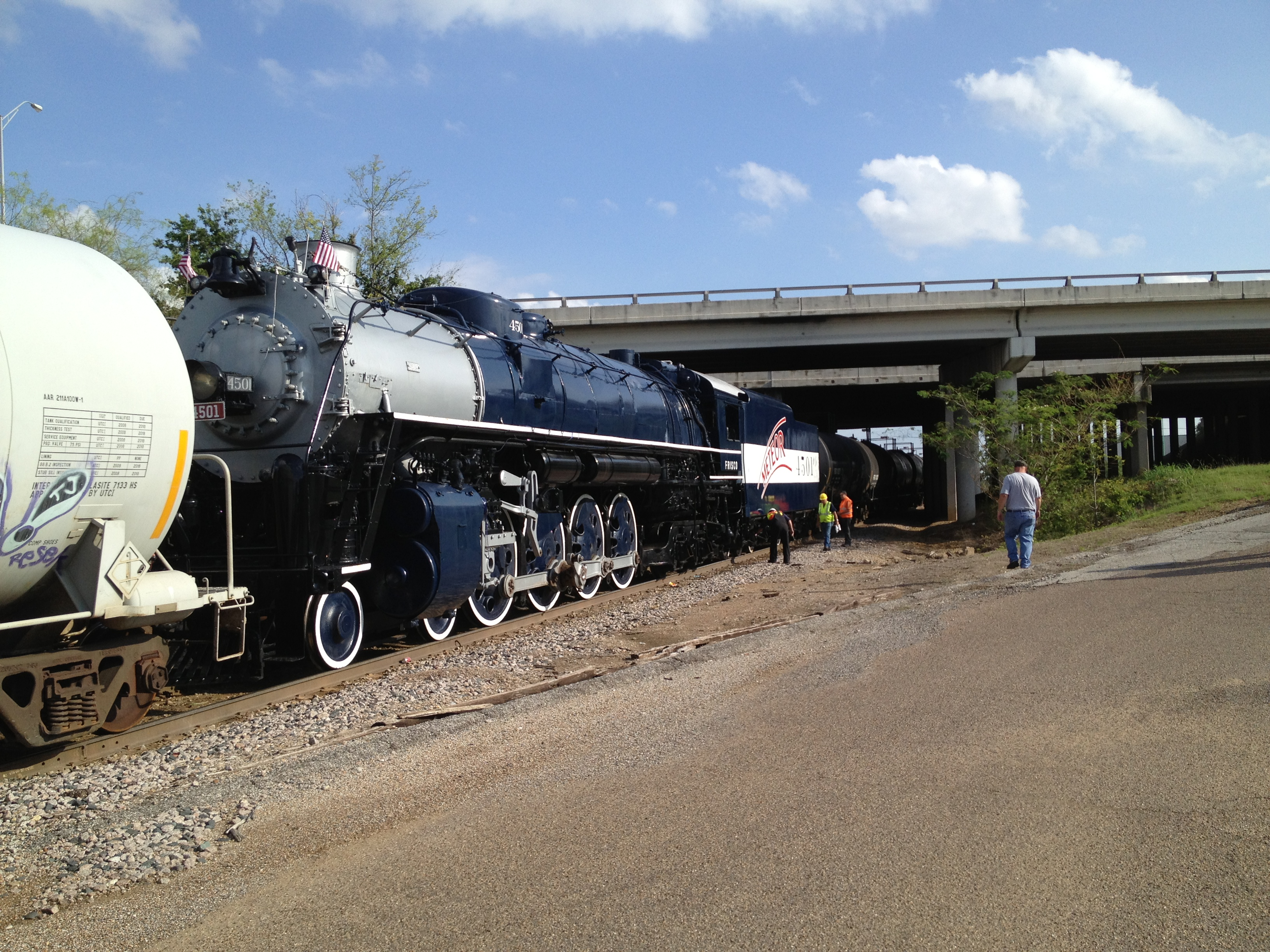
Frisco 4501 in Irving, TX during move to Frisco, TX

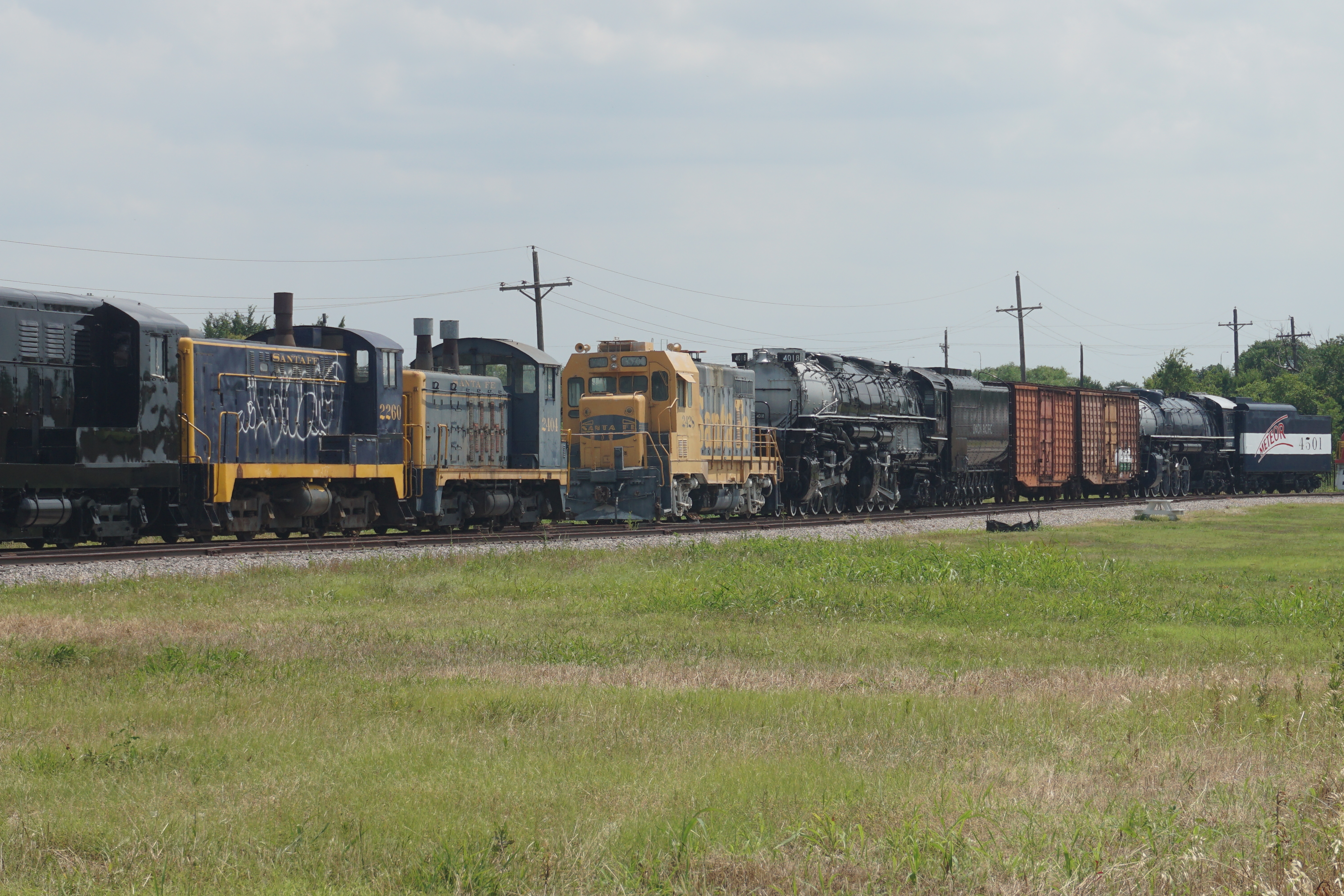
The Museum of the American Railroad's Frisco, Texas, location in June 2019

The collection includes:

=== Locomotives ===
Steam

- Union Pacific #4018: Big Boy 4-8-8-4 (Built by ALCO in 1941)
- St. Louis-San Francisco Railway #4501: 4-8-4 (Baldwin, 1942) Famous for pulling the Meteor
- St. Louis-San Francisco Railway #1625: 2-10-0 (ALCO, 1918)
- Dallas Union Terminal #7: 0-6-0 (Baldwin, 1923)

Diesel

- Southern Pacific #2379: Fairbanks Morse H12-44 Built 1956 (Operational)
- Colorado & Wyoming #1107: Baldwin VO-1000 Built 1943 (Operational)
- Union Pacific #6913: EMD DDA40X Built 1969
- United States Army #8000: ALCO RSD-1 Built 1942 (Originally an ALCO RS-1 built for New York, Susquehanna & Western as #231, rebuilt by ALCO as one of the first RSD-1s) (Operational)
- Santa Fe #49: EMD F7 Built 1952 (formerly Canadian National #9167, repainted into Santa Fe Red Warbonnet colors in 2006) (Operational)
- BNSF #97: EMD SDFP45 Built 1967 (Formerly Santa Fe EMD FP45 #107) Rebuilt in 1982 and reclassified as SDFP45. (Under Restoration)
- Santa Fe #M-160: Doodlebug Built by J. G. Brill Company in 1931. Re-engined in 1952 by AT&SF with an EMD 6-567B. (Operational)
- Santa Fe #2404: EMC NW2, built in July, 1939
- Santa Fe #2260: Baldwin Locomotive Works DS4-4-1000, built February, 1948
- Santa Fe #608: Fairbanks-Morse H12-44, built November, 1951
- Santa Fe #59L: American Locomotive Company PA-1 Built 1948, now under restoration. Also known as Delaware and Hudson Railway #16 and Ferrocarriles Nacionales de México #DH-16
- Santa Fe #2428: Santa Fe CF7
- Santa Fe #2447: Santa Fe CF7
- Asarco #10: Whitcomb Locomotive Company 1945 Class 8-DM-67 (21 1/2 inch (Hunt) gauge)
- Southern Pacific #MW8209: EMD F7B 1949 (Originally SP #6151C, renumbered when converted for snow plow service) (Under Cosmetic Restoration)
- Vulcan Materials Company Plymouth Locomotive Works: Model ML8 1943 (30-ton)

Electric

- Pennsylvania Railroad class GG1 #4903

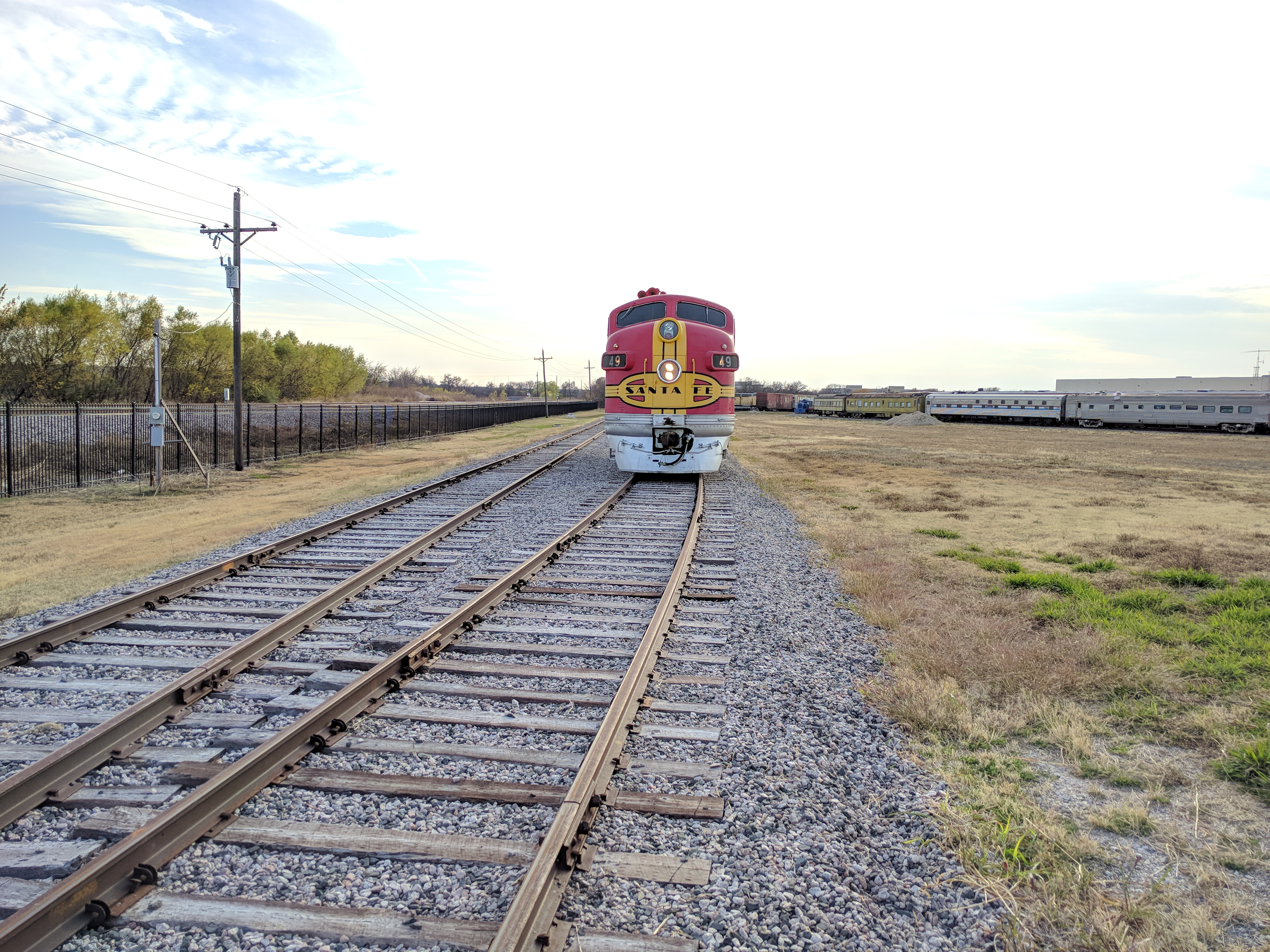
AT&SF #49 at the Museum of the American Railroad in Frisco, TX

=== Passenger equipment ===
Sleepers

- Amtrak #2997: (Ex-AT&SF 1642 "Pine Ring") Budd 10-Roomette, 6-Double bedroom, Built 1950
- Amtrak #2913: "Pacific Gardens" (Ex-UP #1417) Budd Originally a 10-Roomette, 6-Double bedroom. Converted to crew lounge/dorm by Amtrak, Built 1950
- Amtrak #2090: Budd Slumbercoach Built 1959. Originally Missouri Pacific #699 "Southland" then bought by Northern Pacific and ran as #329 "Loch Tarbet".
- Amtrak #2532: (Ex-B&O 7102 "Gull") Budd 16-Duplex roomette, 4-Double bedroom, Built 1954
- Pullman Company "Glengyle" :7-Compartment, 2- Drawing Room, Earliest known surviving heavyweight all steel sleeping car, built by Pullman in 1911
- Amtrak #2516: ex-Union Pacific #1417 "Pacific Gardens" Lounge-dormitory car Budd Company, Built 1950
- Pullman Company "Goliad": 12-Open section, 1-Drawing room, Built 1926. Served almost exclusively on Southern Pacific's Sunset Limited. One of the first cars air-conditioned in the 1930s
- Pullman Company "Glen Nevis": 6-Compartment, 3-Drawing Room, Built 1925
- Pullman Company "McQuaig": 12-Open section, 1-Drawing room, Built 1925

Coaches

- Santa Fe #3197: chair-observation Pullman Company 1940
- Texas and Pacific Railway #1143: chair car Pullman Company 1920
- St. Louis-San Francisco Railway #759: chair car American Car and Foundry Company 1912

Lounges

- Santa Fe #3231: parlor-club car Pullman Company 1914
- Santa Fe #1363: Lounge-dormitory-barbershop San Bartolo, Pullman Company 1926

Diners

- Santa Fe #1550: Lunch counter diner Budd Company 1948
- Santa Fe #1554: Lunch counter diner Budd Company 1948
- Missouri-Kansas-Texas Railroad #438: dining car American Car and Foundry Company 1937

Other

- Fort Worth and Denver Railway Business car:- Texland, Pullman Company 1900, Originally Colorado & Southern Railway observation car.
- Texas and Pacific Railway Railway Post Office-Baggage Car #916: Pullman Company 1918

=== Transit Equipment ===
- Metra Electric District (Ex-Illinois Central Railroad) "Highliners" Built by St. Louis Car Company (First order #1501-1630, 1971–1972) and Bombardier Transportation (Second order #1631-1666, 1978–1979) (All Operational)
- 1548
- 1552
- 1601
- 1608
- 1661
- And five more
- Trinity Railway Express RDC-1 #2001 built by the Budd Company in 1954
- Vought Airtrans Car #45

=== Freight equipment ===
- Kansas City Southern #7460: single sheathed boxcar
- Kansas City Southern Lines #107859: boxcar
- Lone Star Producing Company #1817: tank car
- Western Pacific Railroad #68652: boxcar
- Texas & Pacific Railroad #X4446: boxcar
- Packers Car Line (Armour & Company) PCX 4063: Ice Refrigerator Car
- Packers Car Line (Armour & Company) PCX 4005: Ice Refrigerator Car
- Genesee & Wyoming Railroad #GNWR 1032: Mechanical Refrigerator Car

=== Cabooses ===
- Santa Fe Caboose #999311: Built 1949
- Santa Fe Caboose #1618
- Cotton Belt #2332: drover caboose Built 1920
- Richmond, Fredericksburg and Potomac Railroad #932: Built 1971

=== Speeders/Handcars ===
- Union Pacific Railroad #MT14444M: Fairmont Railway Motors Model M-14 Built 1977 (Onan 2 cyl. engine)
- Track-Work Incorporated (Ex-Chicago Rock Island & Pacific Railroad) #RIMC 915: Fairmont Railway Motors Model S2E Built 1955 (Fairmont 1 cyl. engine)
- Gifford-Hill & Company #H109: handcar, Donated 1964

=== Structures ===
- Houston & Texas Central Railroad Depot, ca. 1905
- Houston & Texas Central Railroad Handcar Shed, Dallas, TX ca. 1905
- Gulf, Colorado, and Santa Fe Railroad Interlocking Tower 19
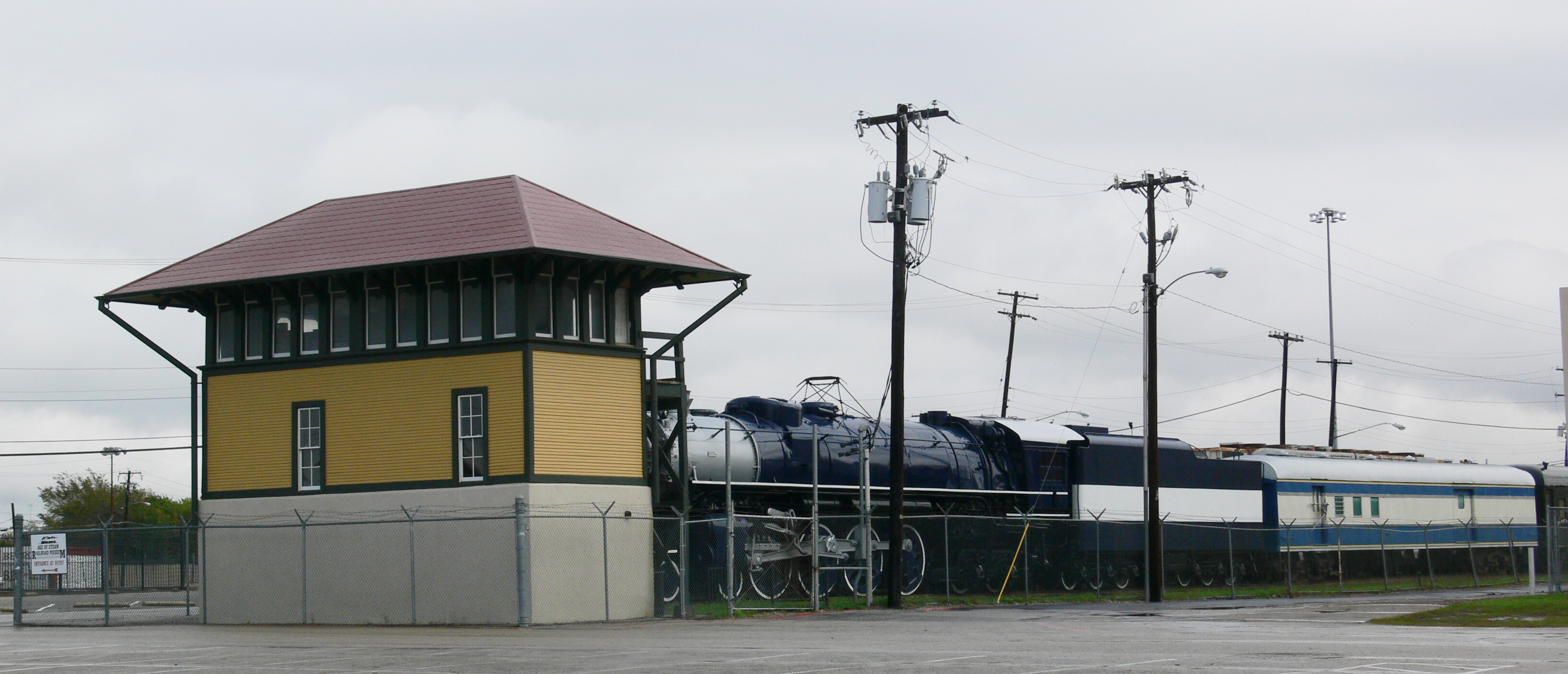
  Tower 19, Frisco 4501 in Fair Park Dallas, TX

=== Road vehicles ===
- Railway Express Agency Ford 1-ton box truck, 1941

=== Formerly owned equipment ===
- Texas & Northern bobber caboose
- Massachusetts Bay Transit Authority PCC #3329
- New Orleans Public Service Incorporated Electric Streetcar #919
- Econo-Rail Inc., Procter & Gamble Plant, Dallas, TX #PG 13: S-2 Diesel Locomotive
- Econo-Rail Inc., Houston, TX #E-R 10: S-6 Diesel Locomotive
- New York Central Railroad Company #3001: 4-8-2
- Texas & Pacific Railway #638: 2-10-4 steam locomotive (scrapped due to vandalism)

== TrainTopia ==
The museum has an exhibit called "TrainTopia – A Railroad Odyssey in Miniature" in the Frisco Discovery Center next to the museum. This is a 2,500-square-foot professionally-built G scale model railroad layout donated to the museum by the Sanders family; a $300,000 donation from the Ryan Foundation funded moving the layout and preparing the exhibit space. The scene spans Texas to Arizona, and includes details such as the dramatic rock formations of the Four Corners region near New Mexico, an animated downtown Dallas street scene, the Palo Duro Drive-In Theater with a movie playing, a West Texas refinery, and working sawmills in Colorado. A custom light show changes the exhibit from day to night. The layout has hundreds of locomotives and cars, most made by LGB in Germany.

== Gallery ==
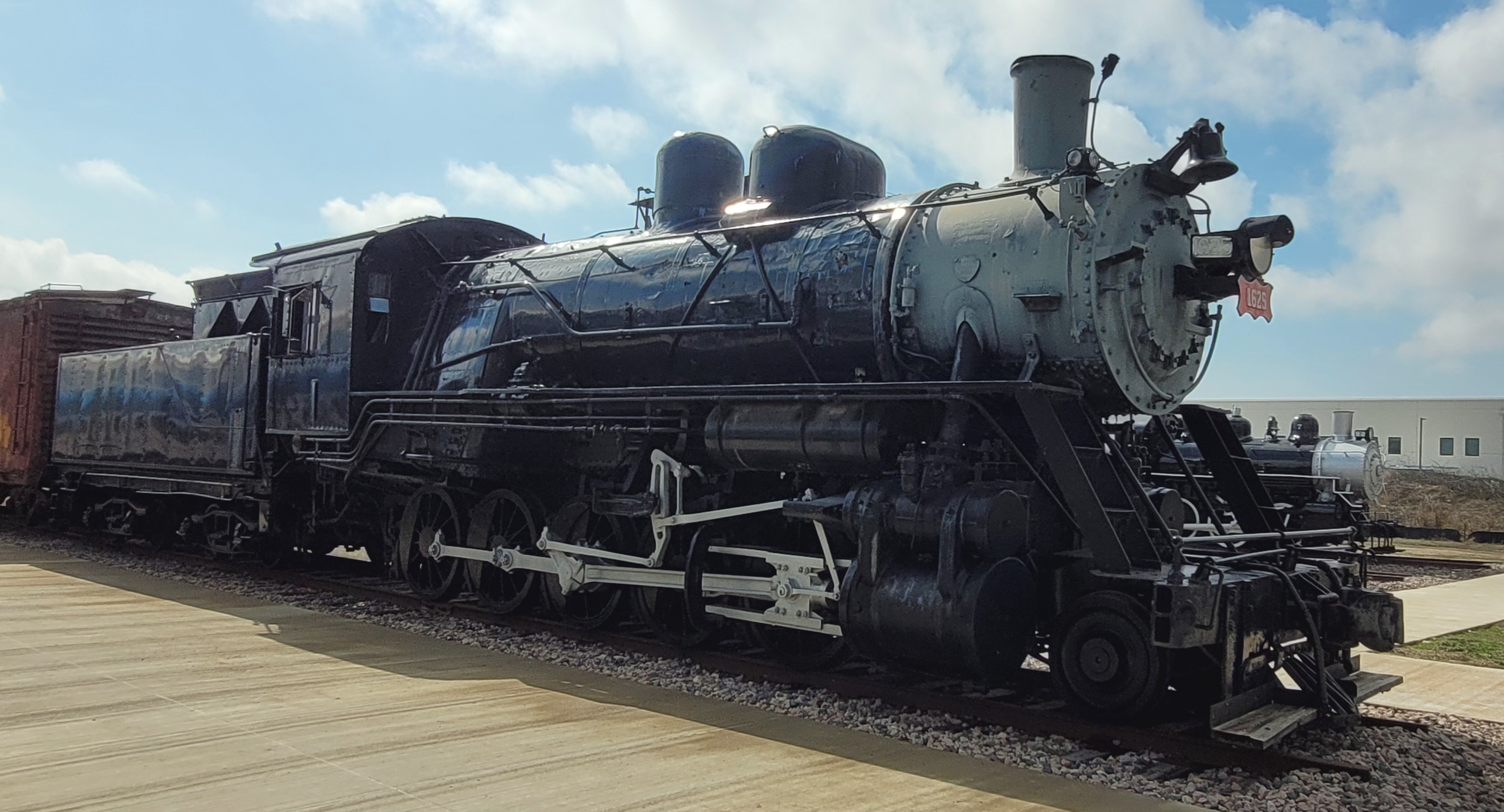
St. Louis-San Francisco. 1625 (2-10-0)

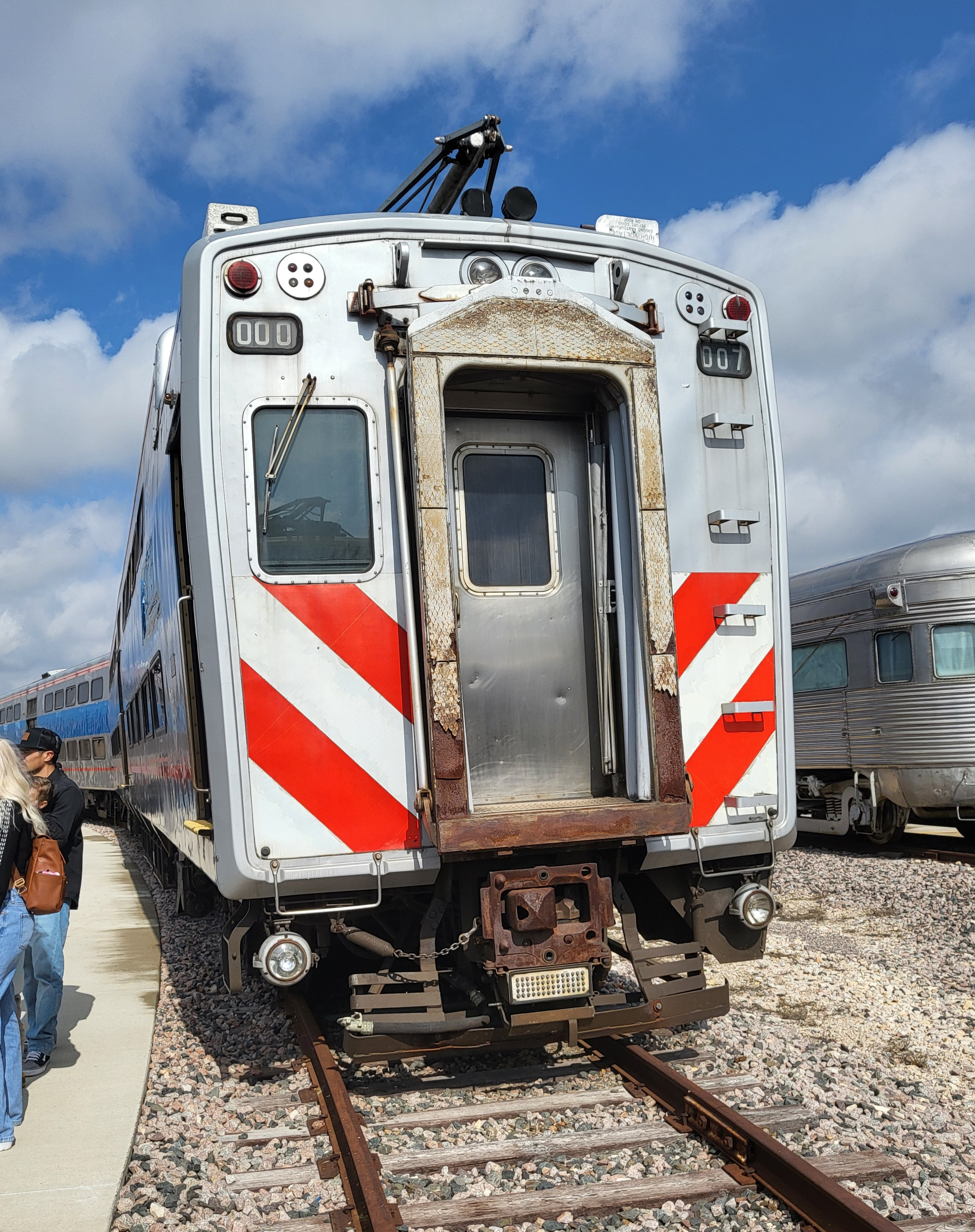
Metra Electric District (ex-Illinois Central) Highliner I (several other cars can be seen behind this unit)

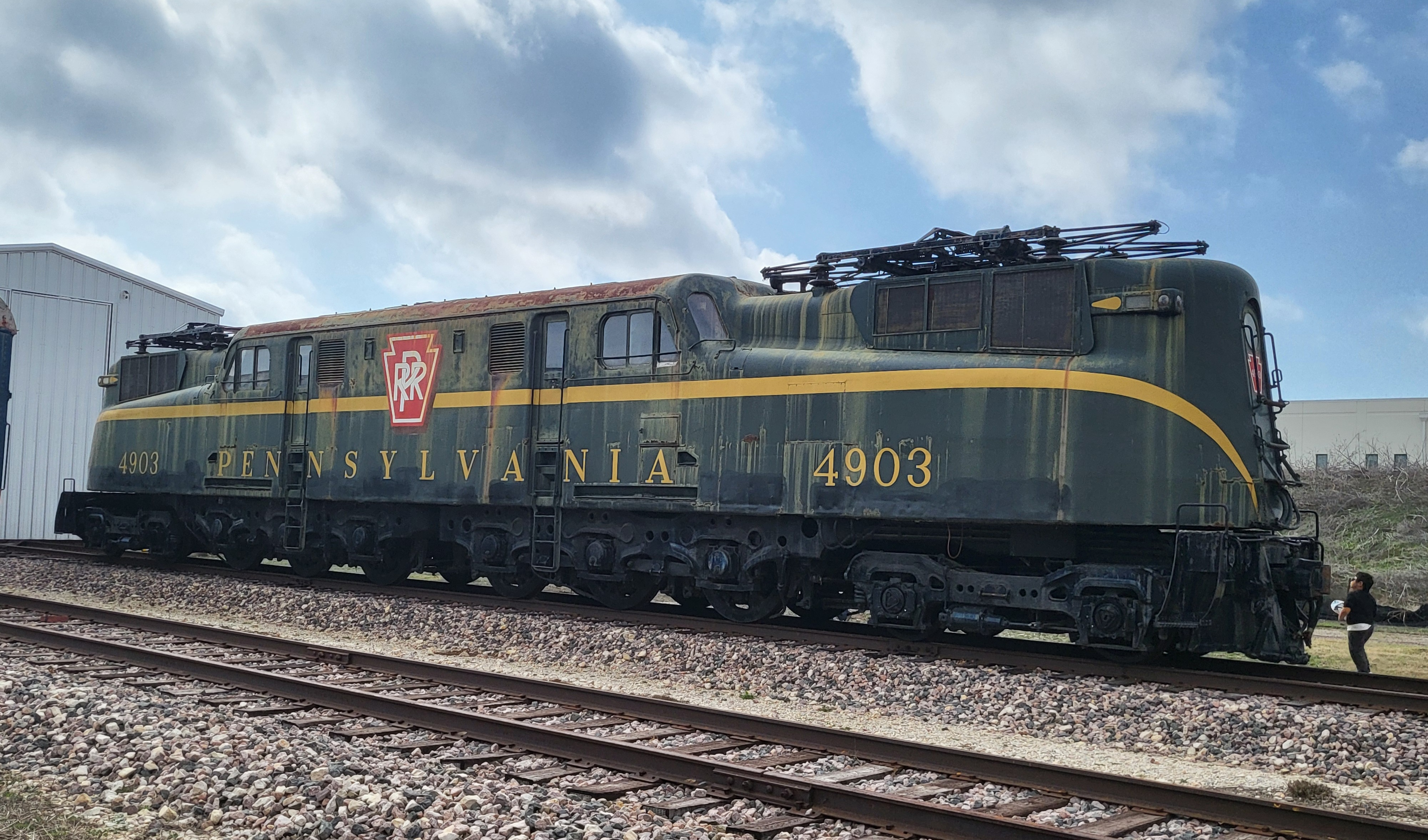
Pennsylvania Railroad GG1 No. 4903

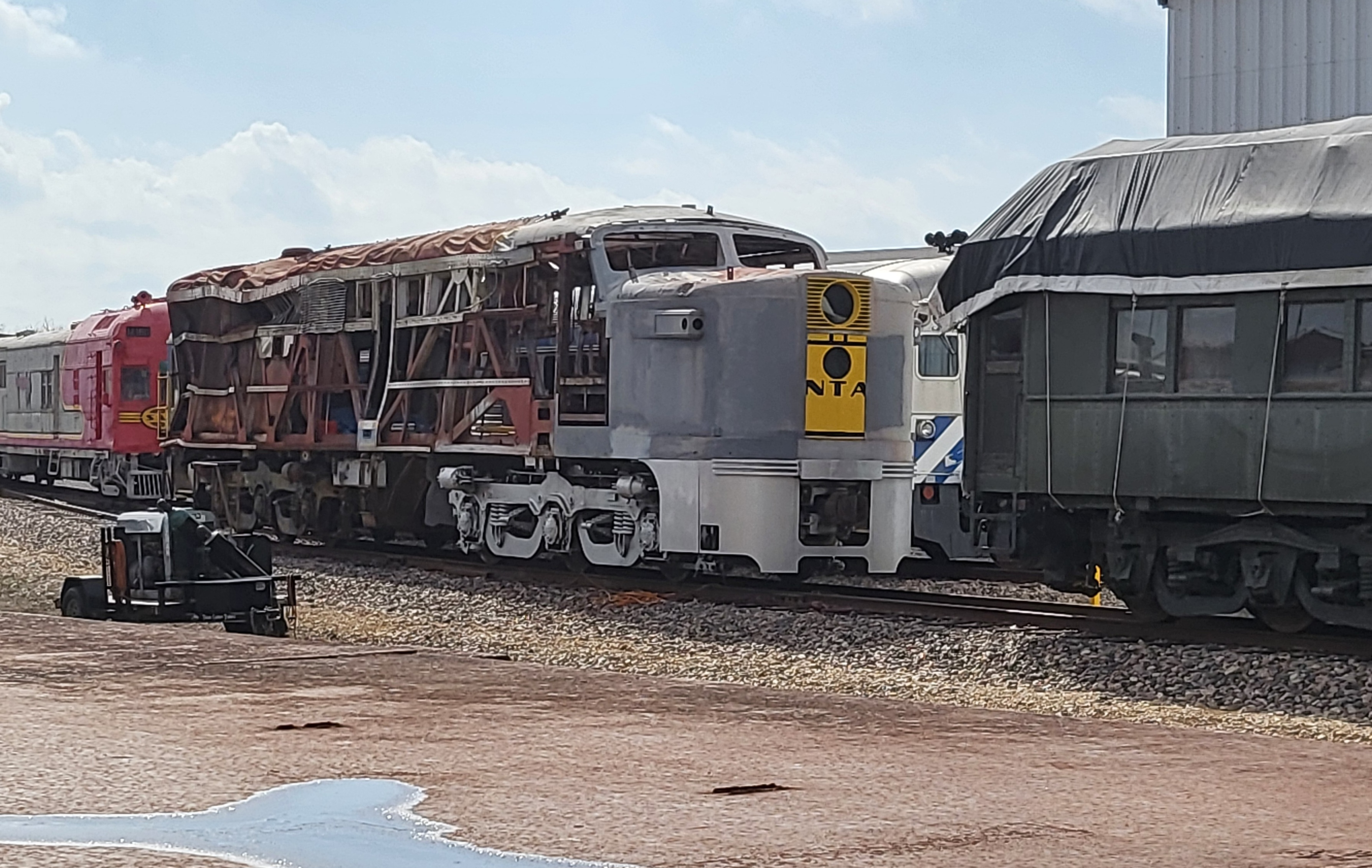
Alco PA-1 ATSF No. 59 as under restoration

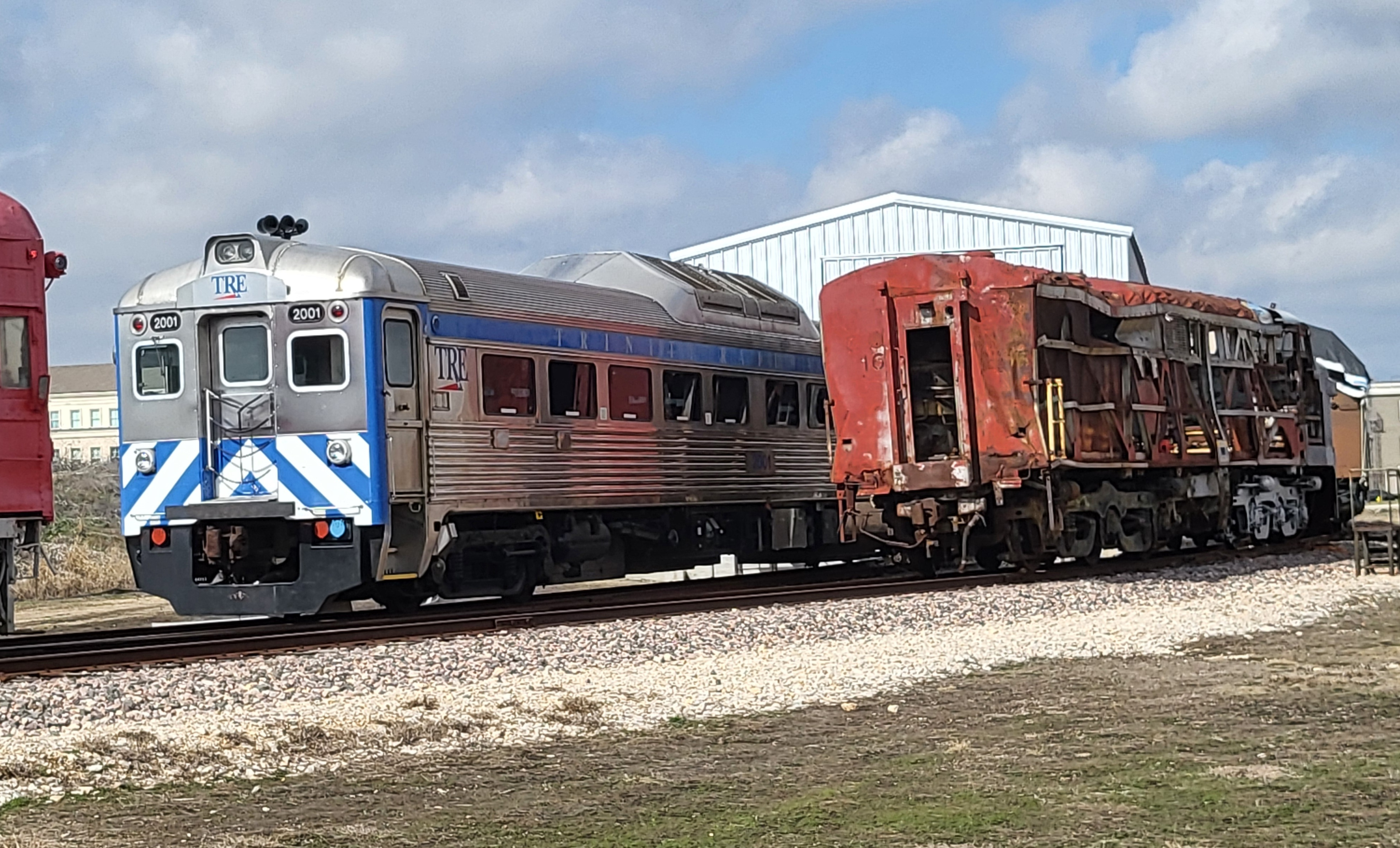
TRE Budd RDC-1 No. 2001 seen next to the PA-1

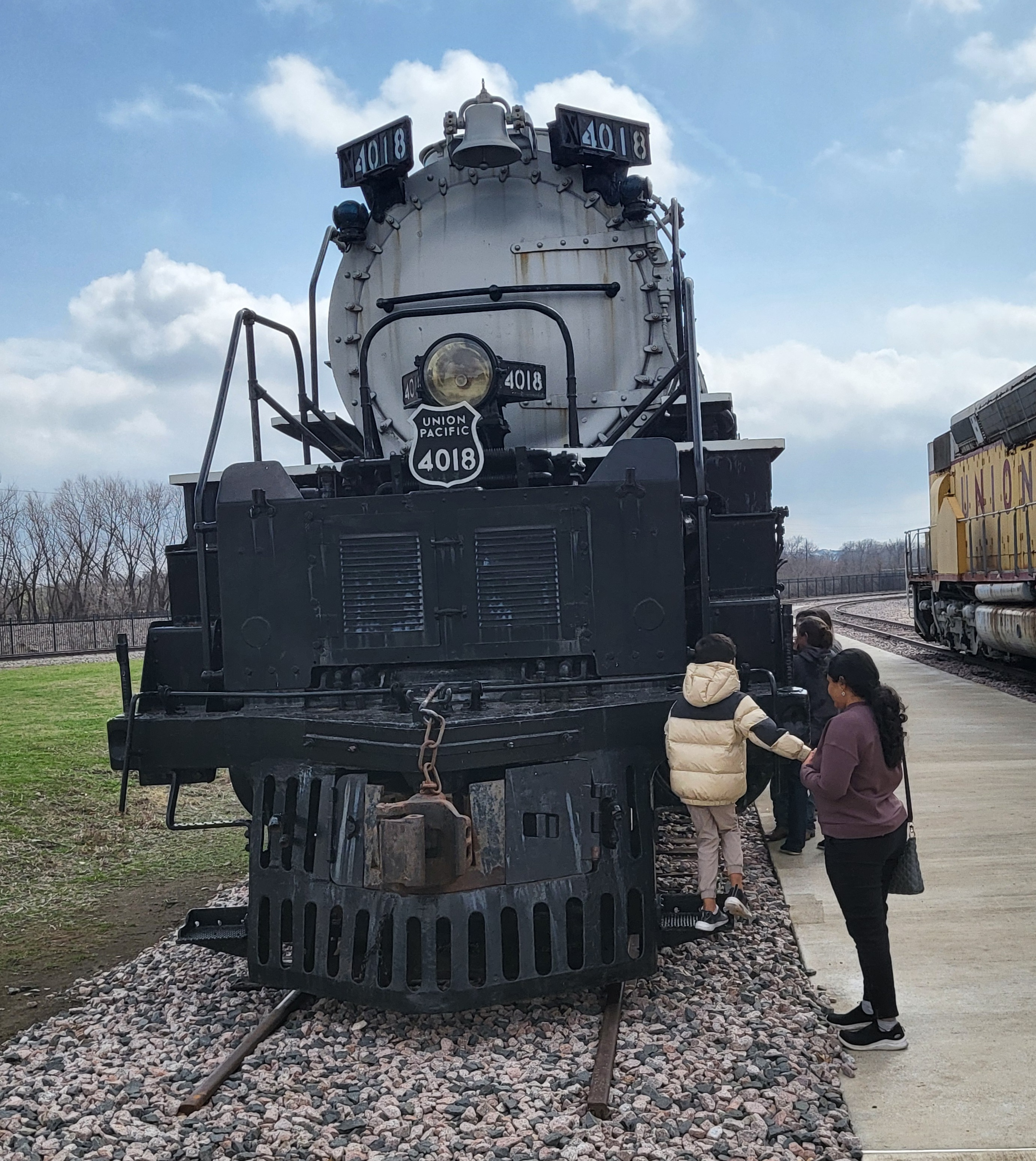
Union Pacific Big Boy (4-8-8-4) No. 4018

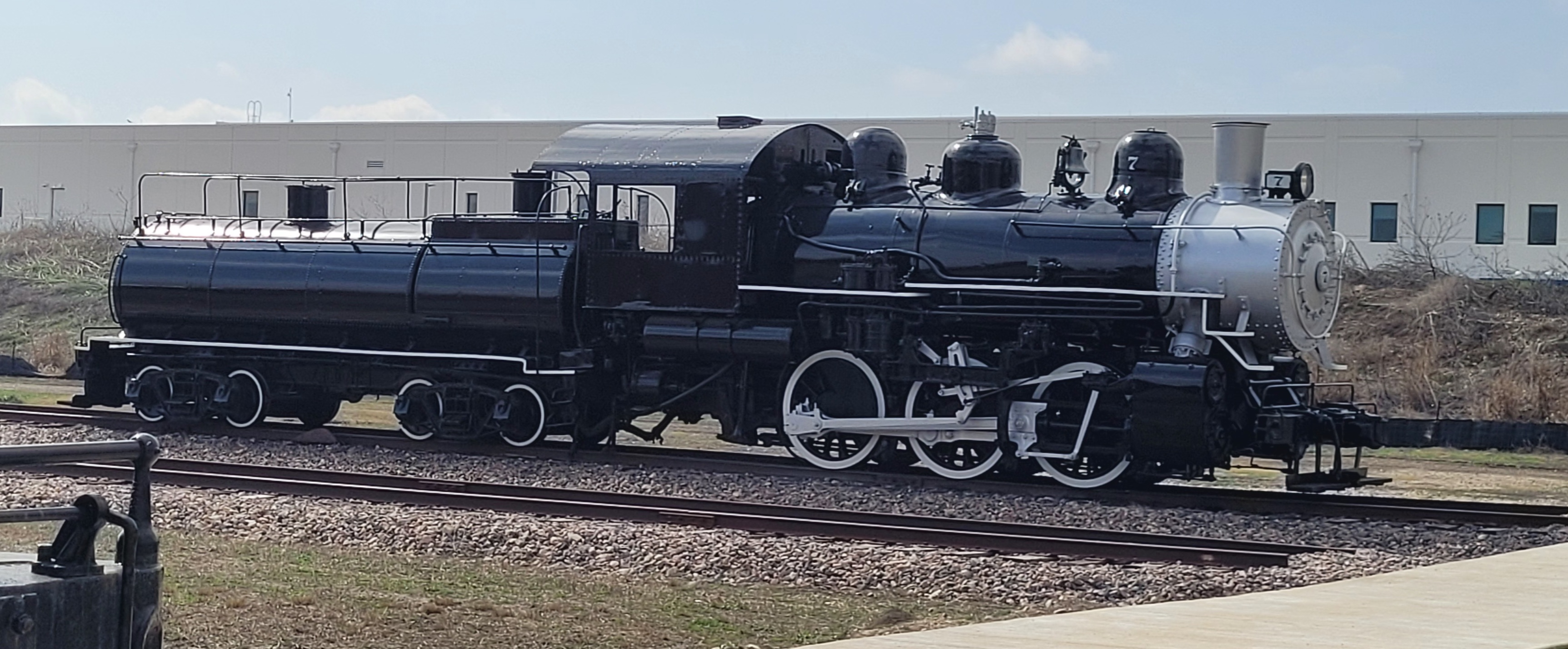
Dallas Union Terminal (ex-Southern Pacific S-12) No. 7 (0-6-0)

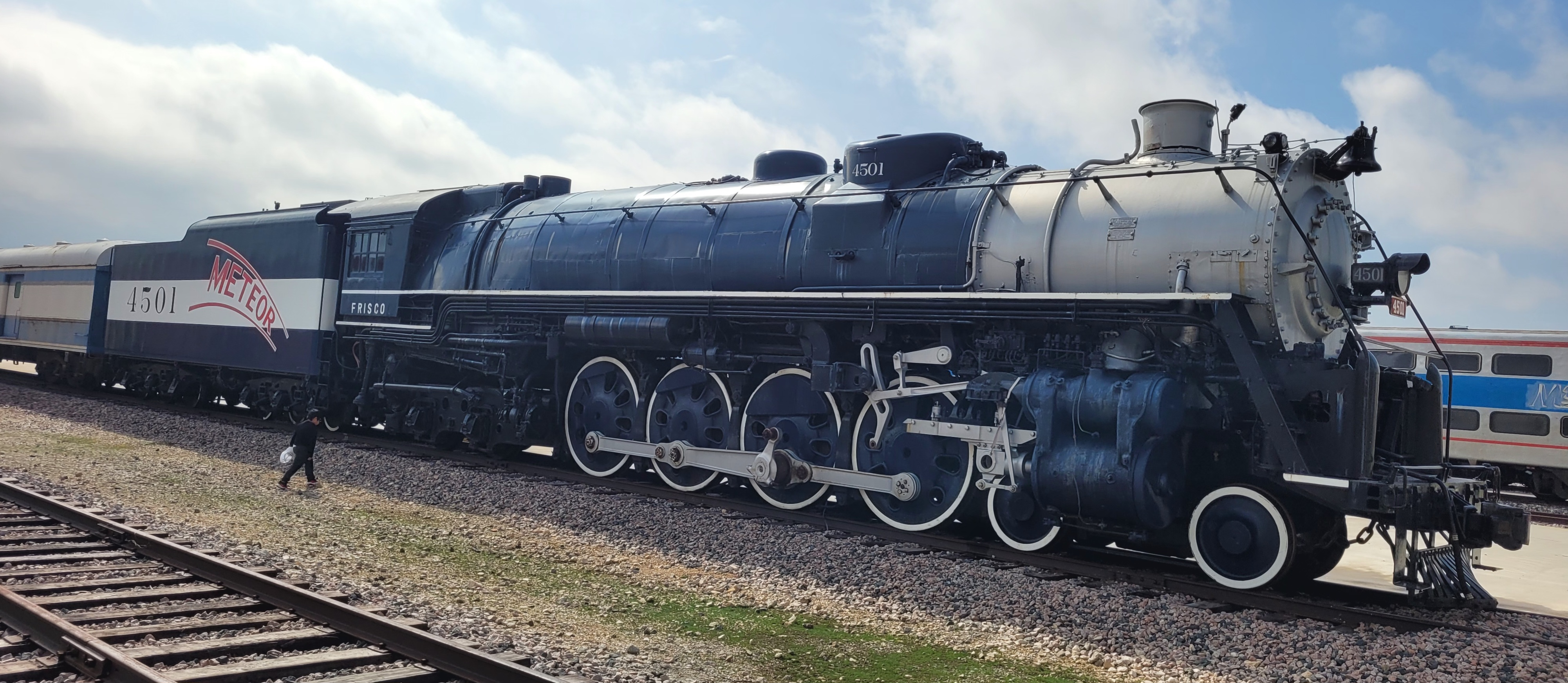
St. Louis-San Francisco No. 4501 (4-8-4)

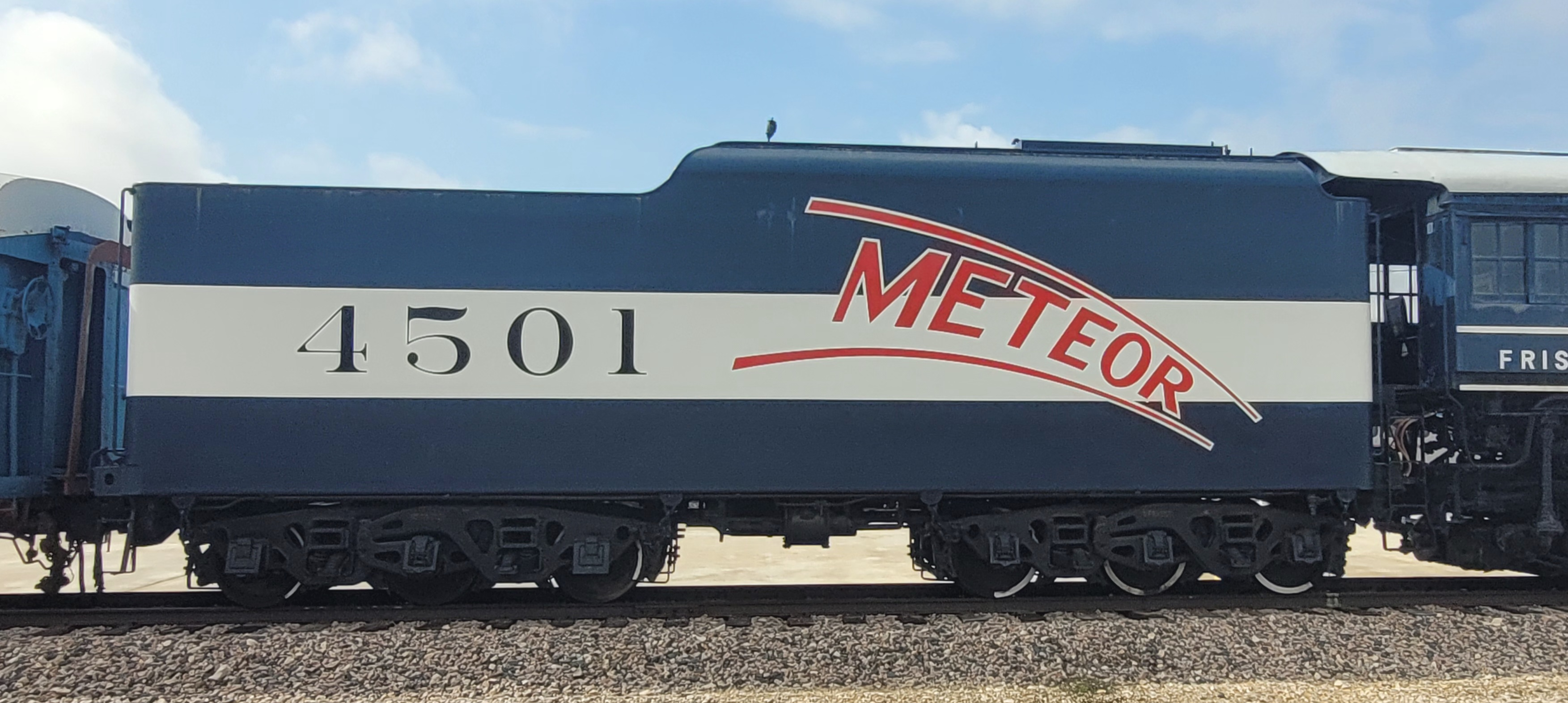
SLSF 4501 tender

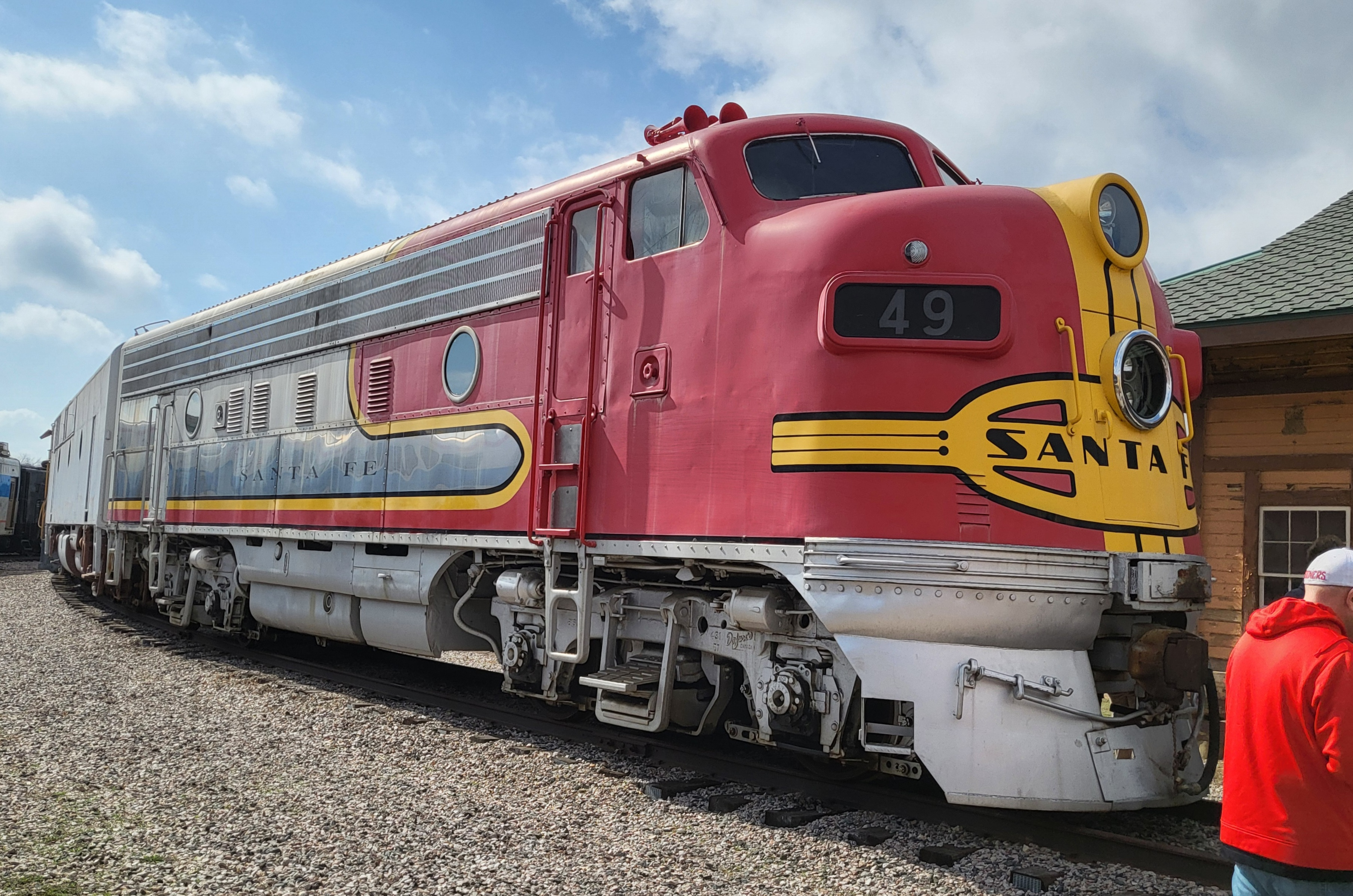
ATSF No. 49 (EMD F7A)

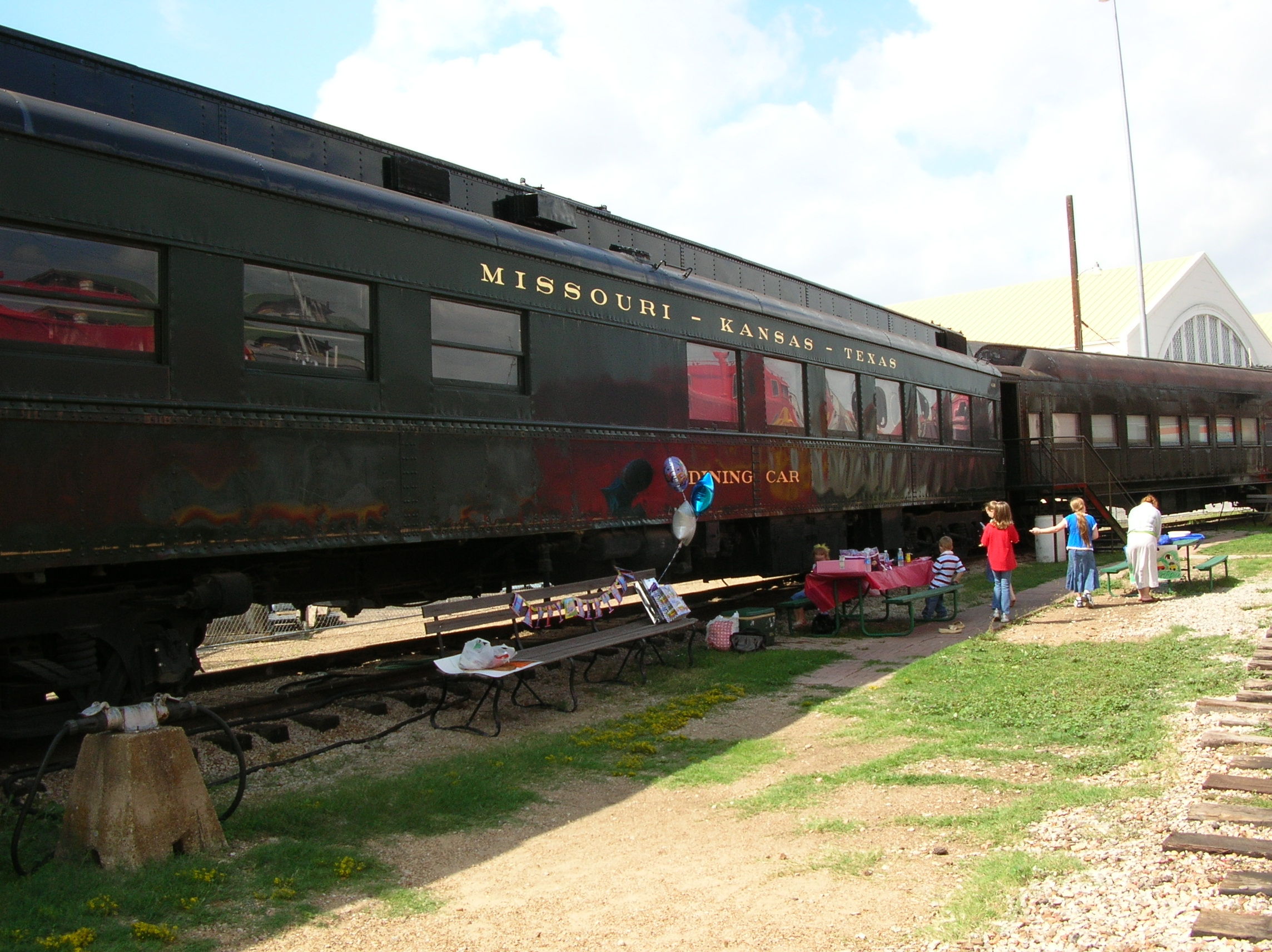
Missouri-Kansas-Texas Railroad dining car -438

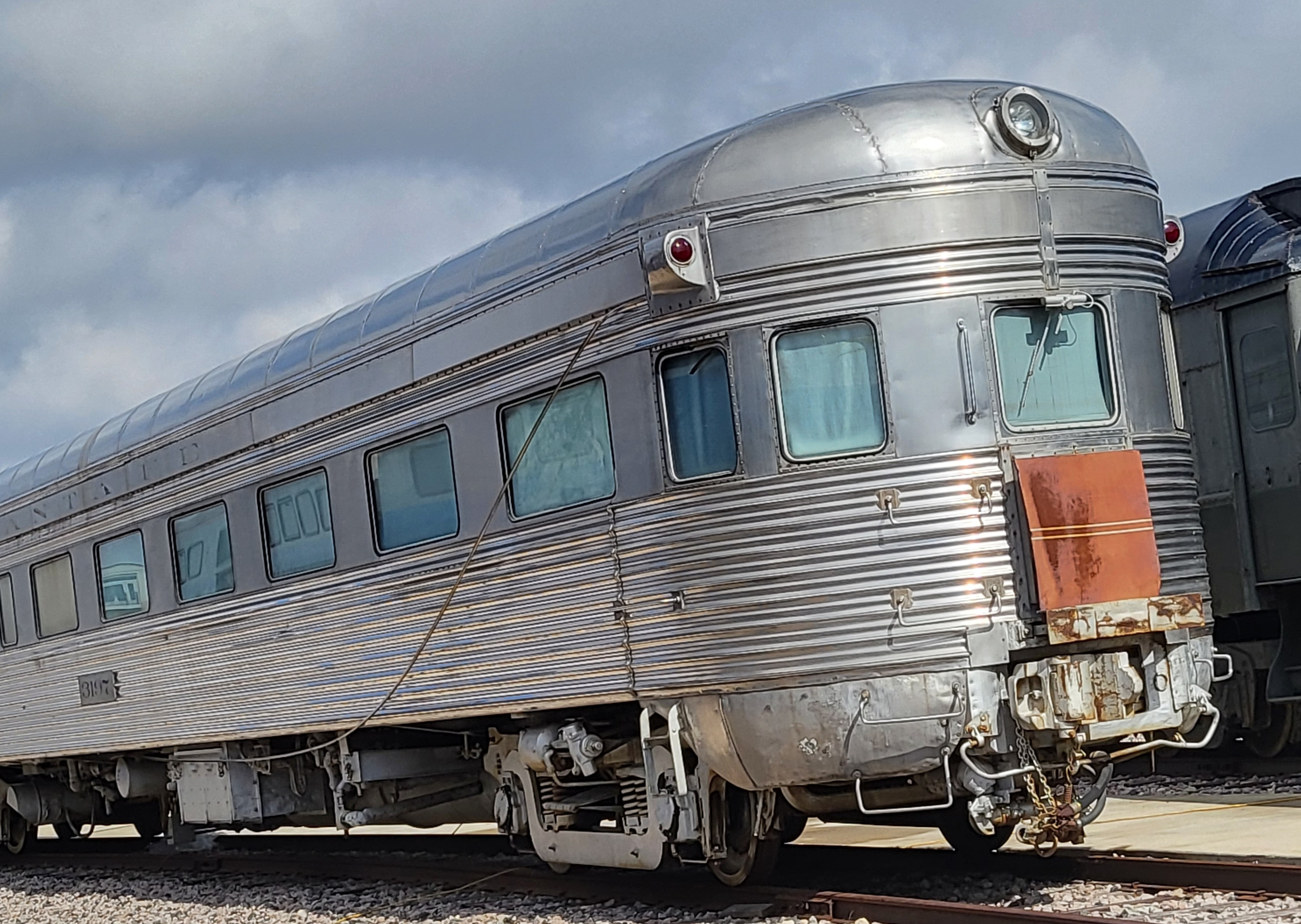
Santa Fe 3197 Observation coach

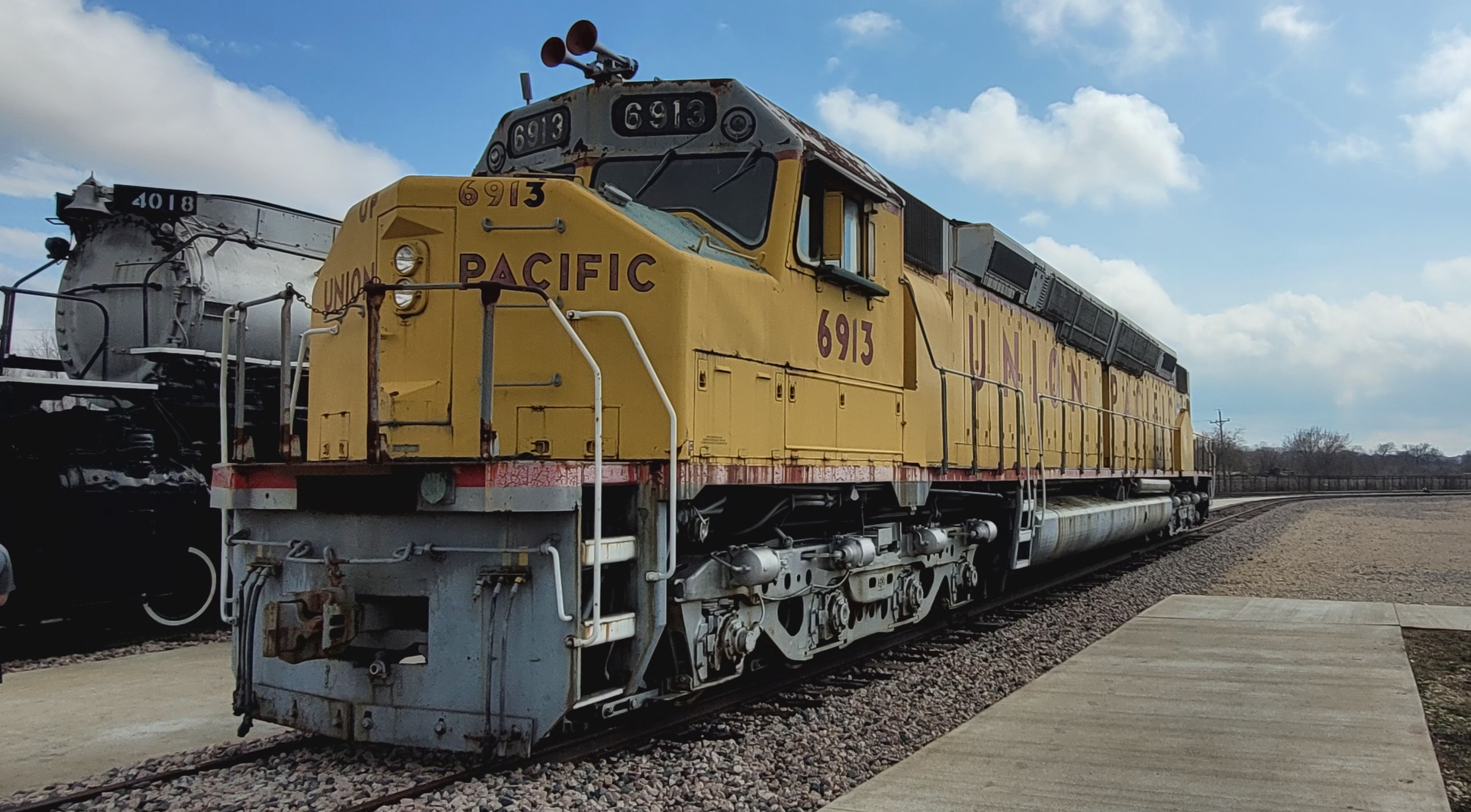
Union Pacific DDA40X 6913

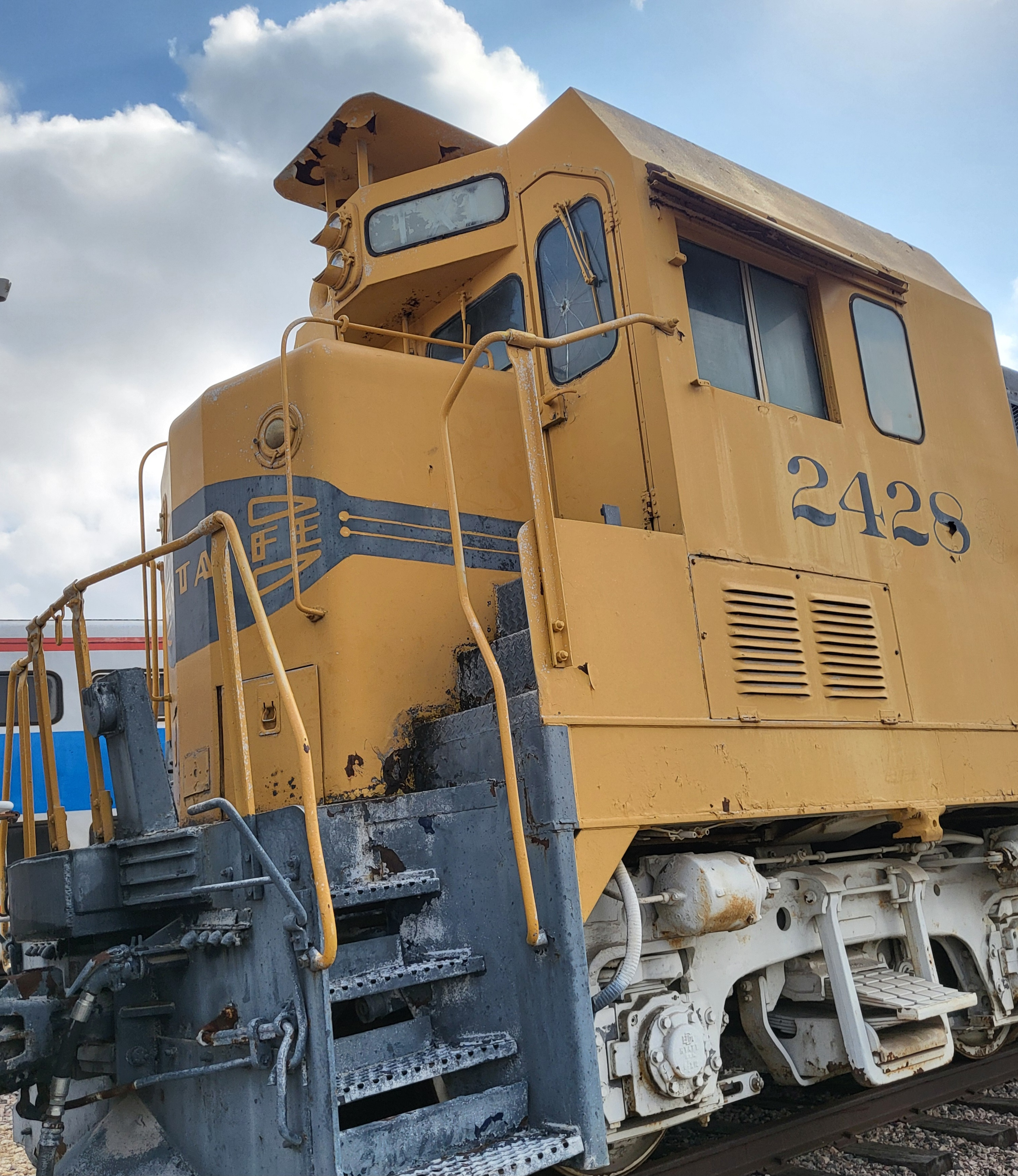
Santa Fe CF7 2428

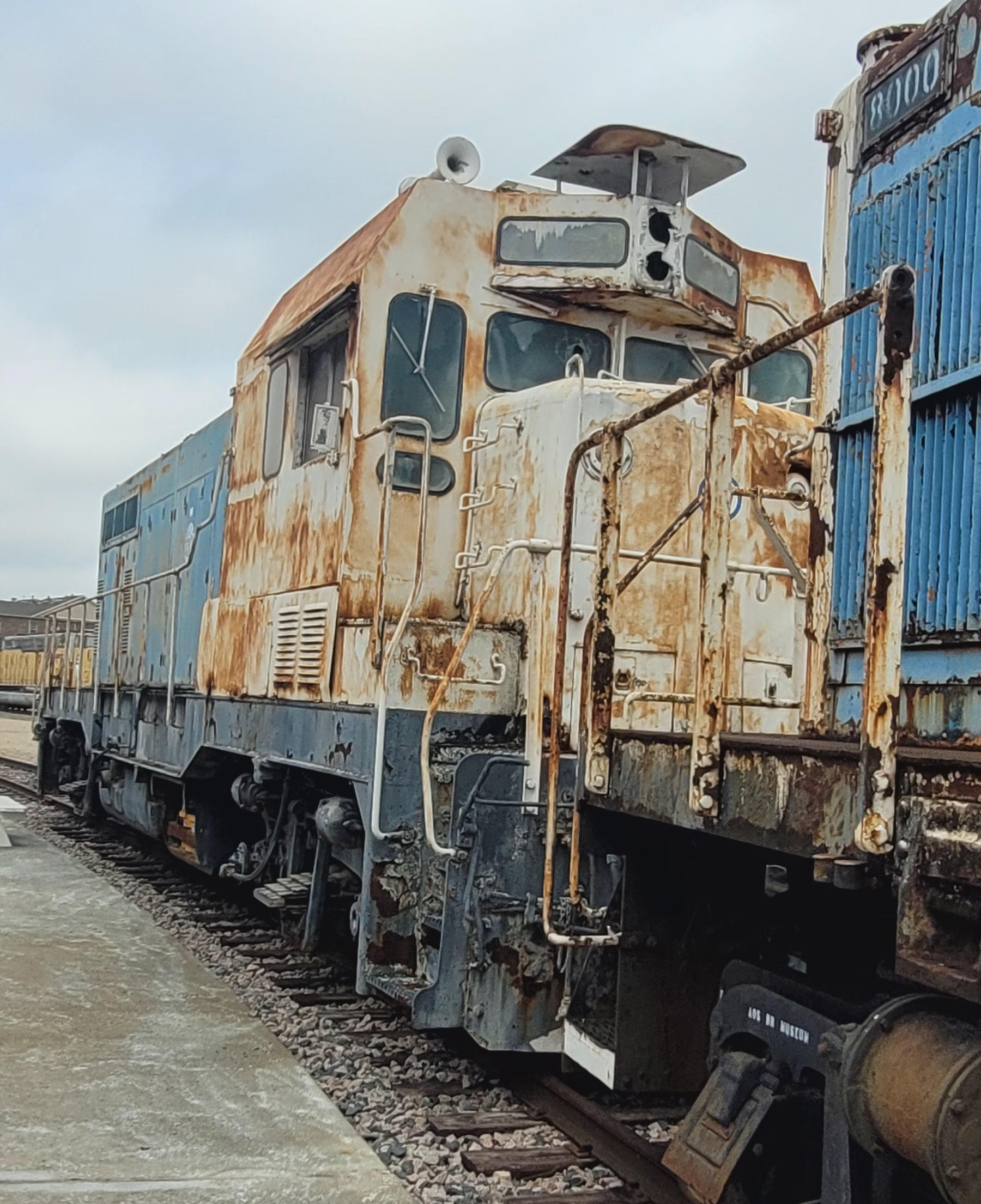
Santa Fe CF7 2447

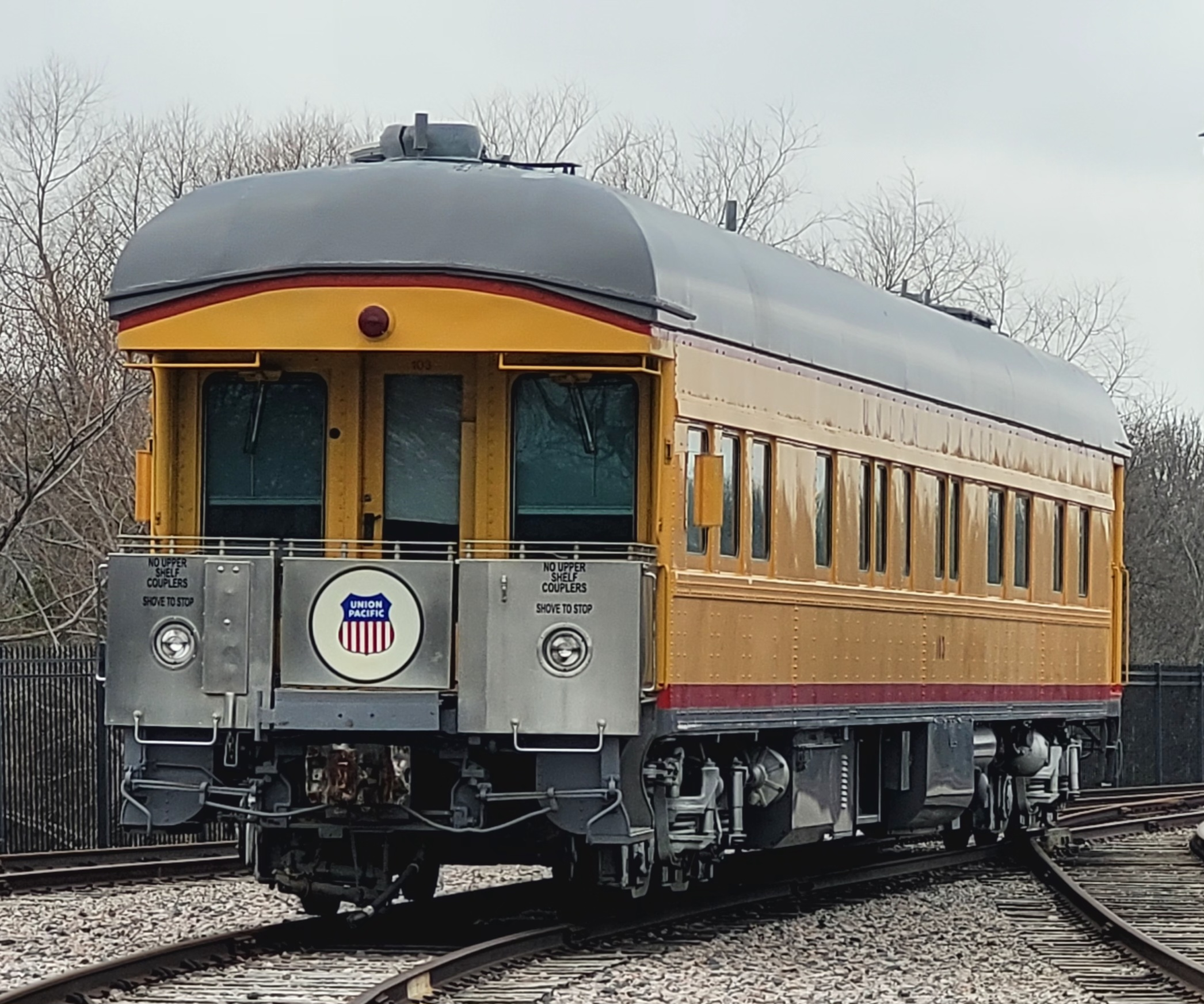
ex-T&P Business Car 1147

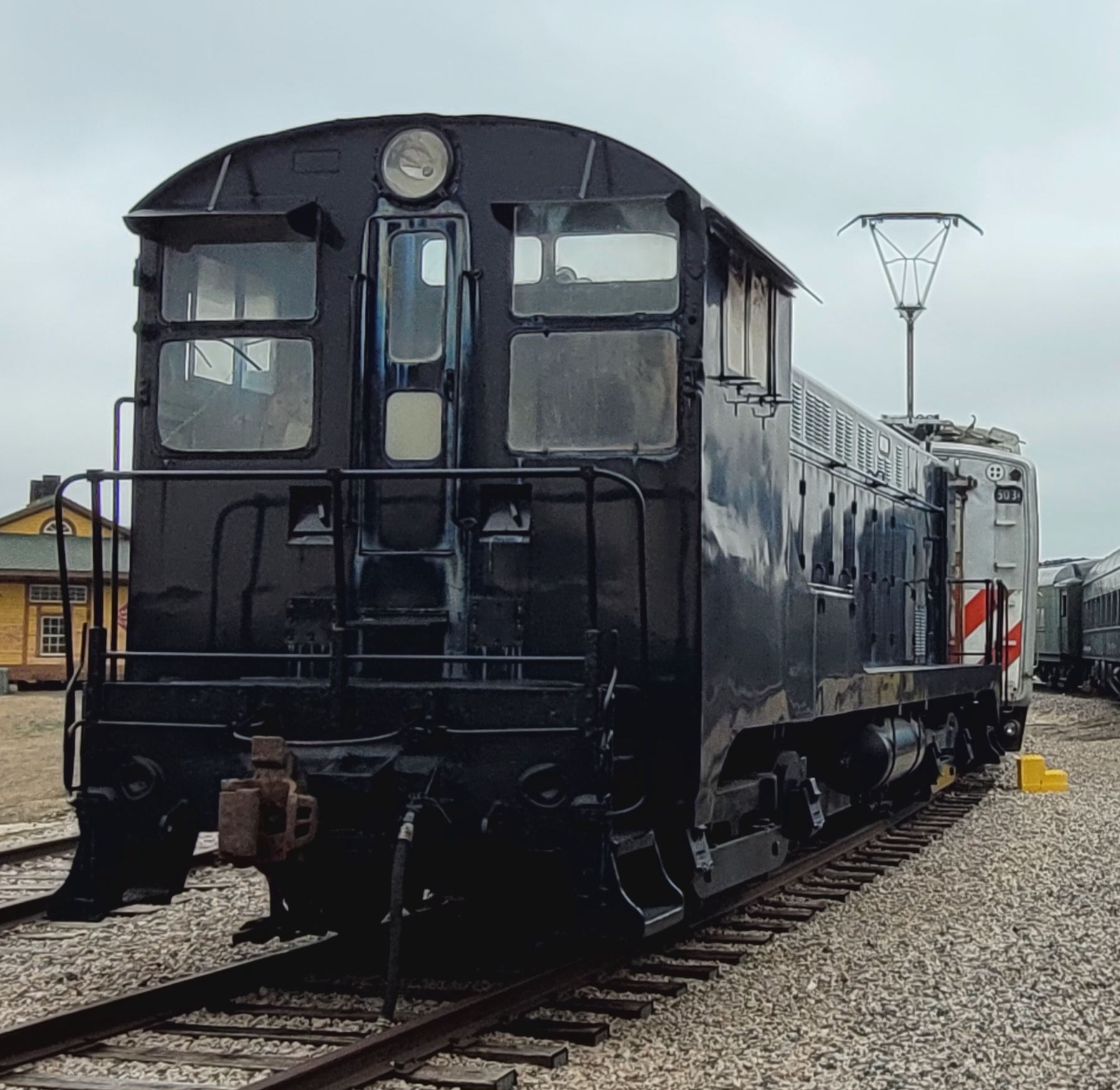
Colorado & Wyoming 1107 Baldwin VO-1000

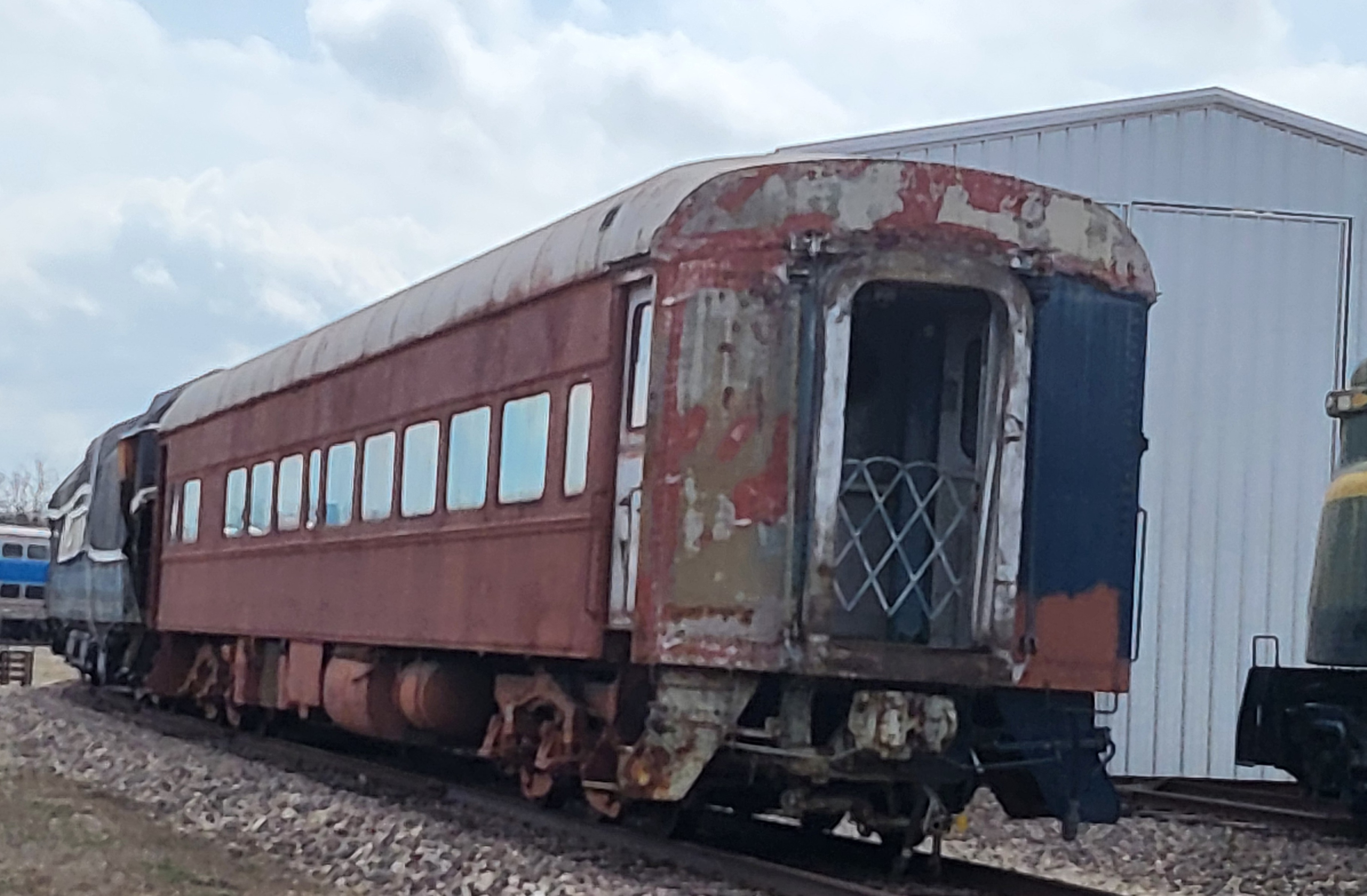
Unidentified Chair car

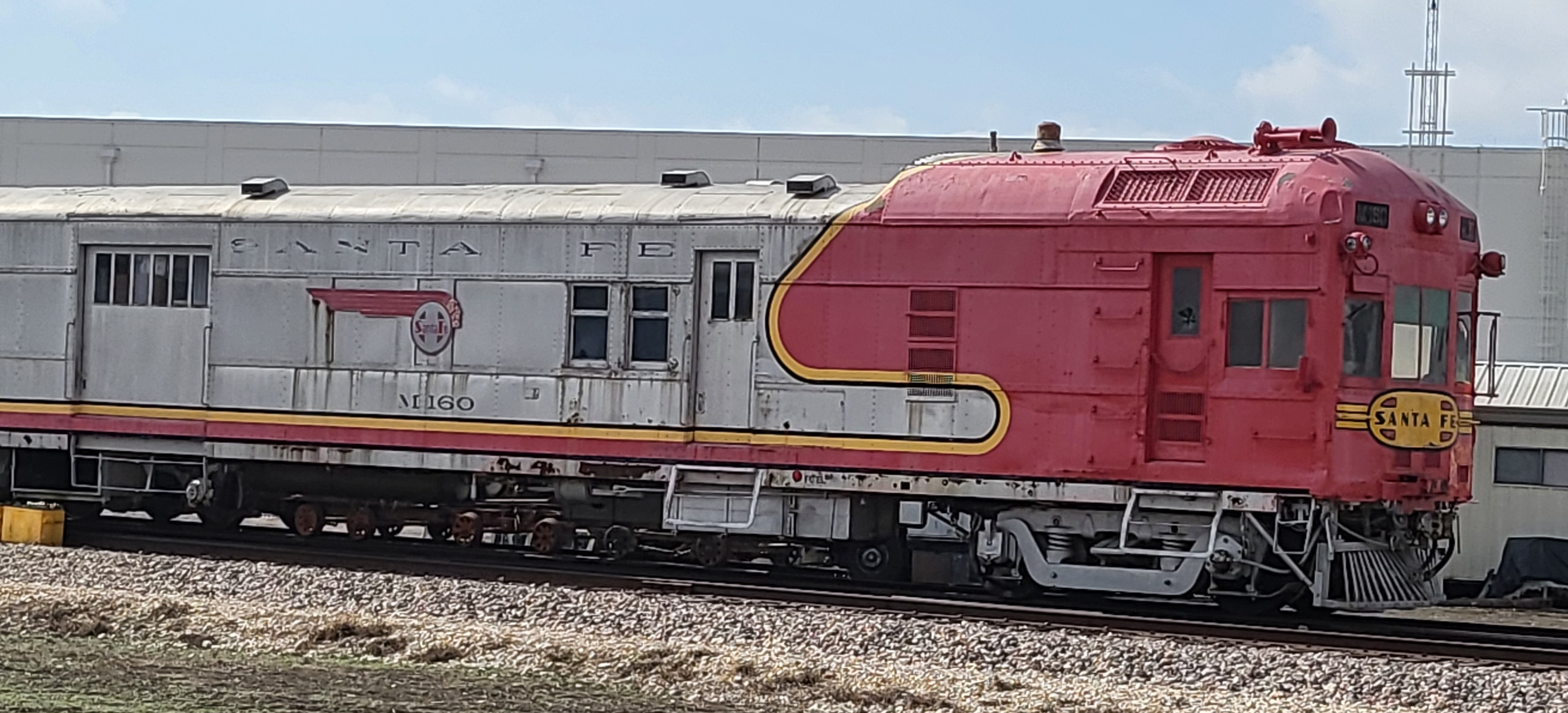
Santa Fe M-160 Gas-electric Doodlebug

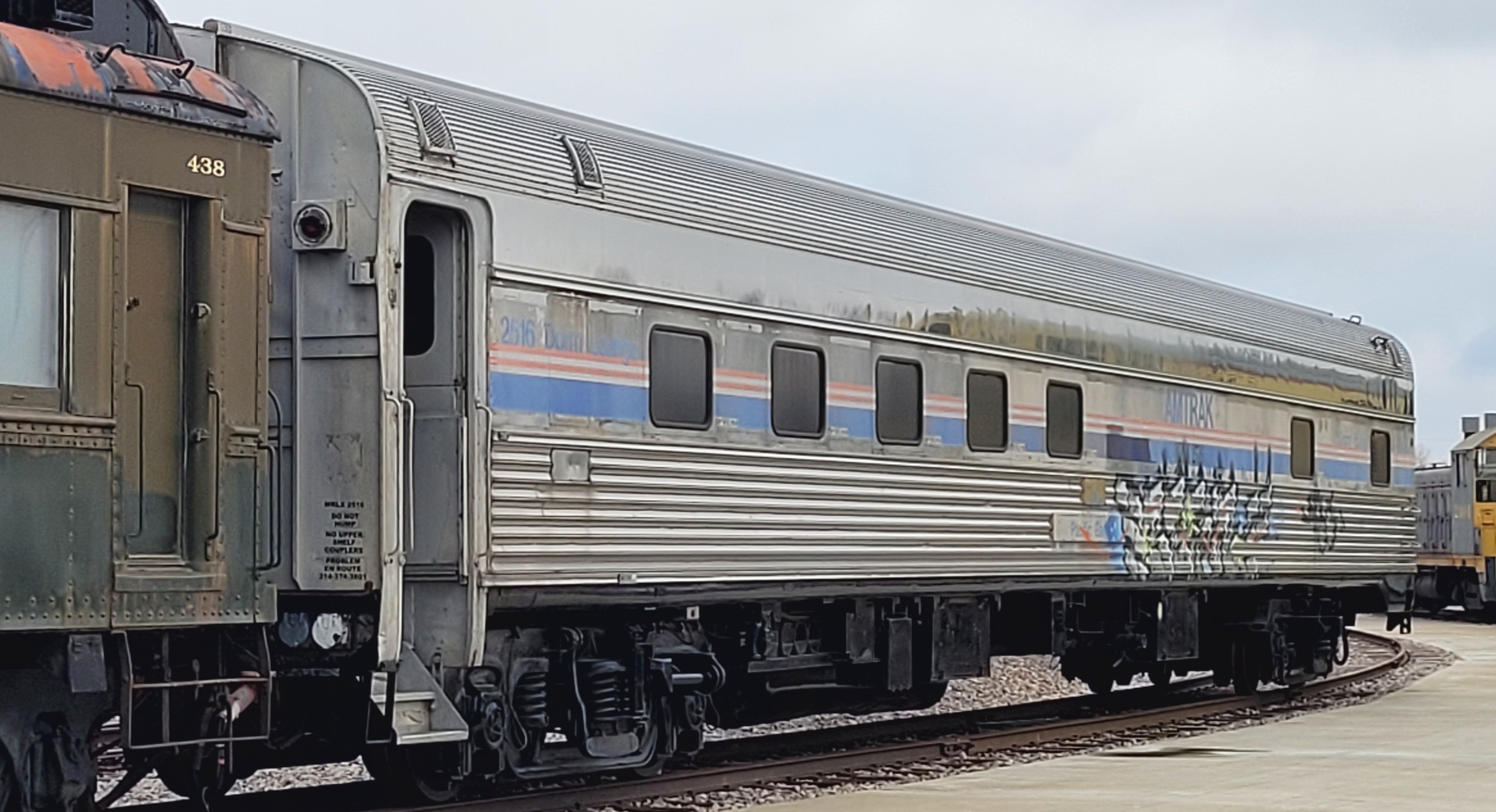
Amtrak 2516 Domitory-lounge car (ex-UP)

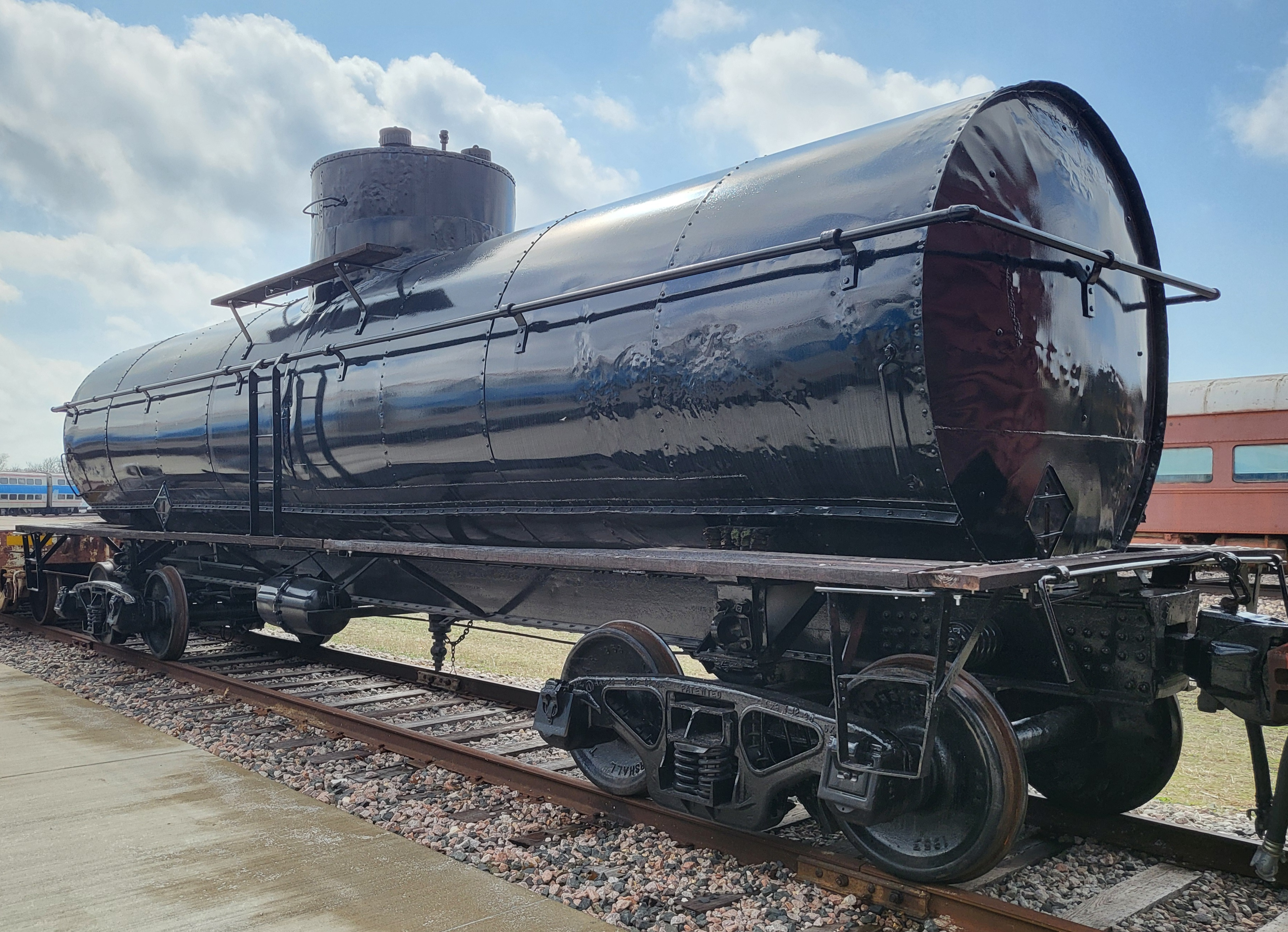
Lone Star Producing Company 1817 tank car

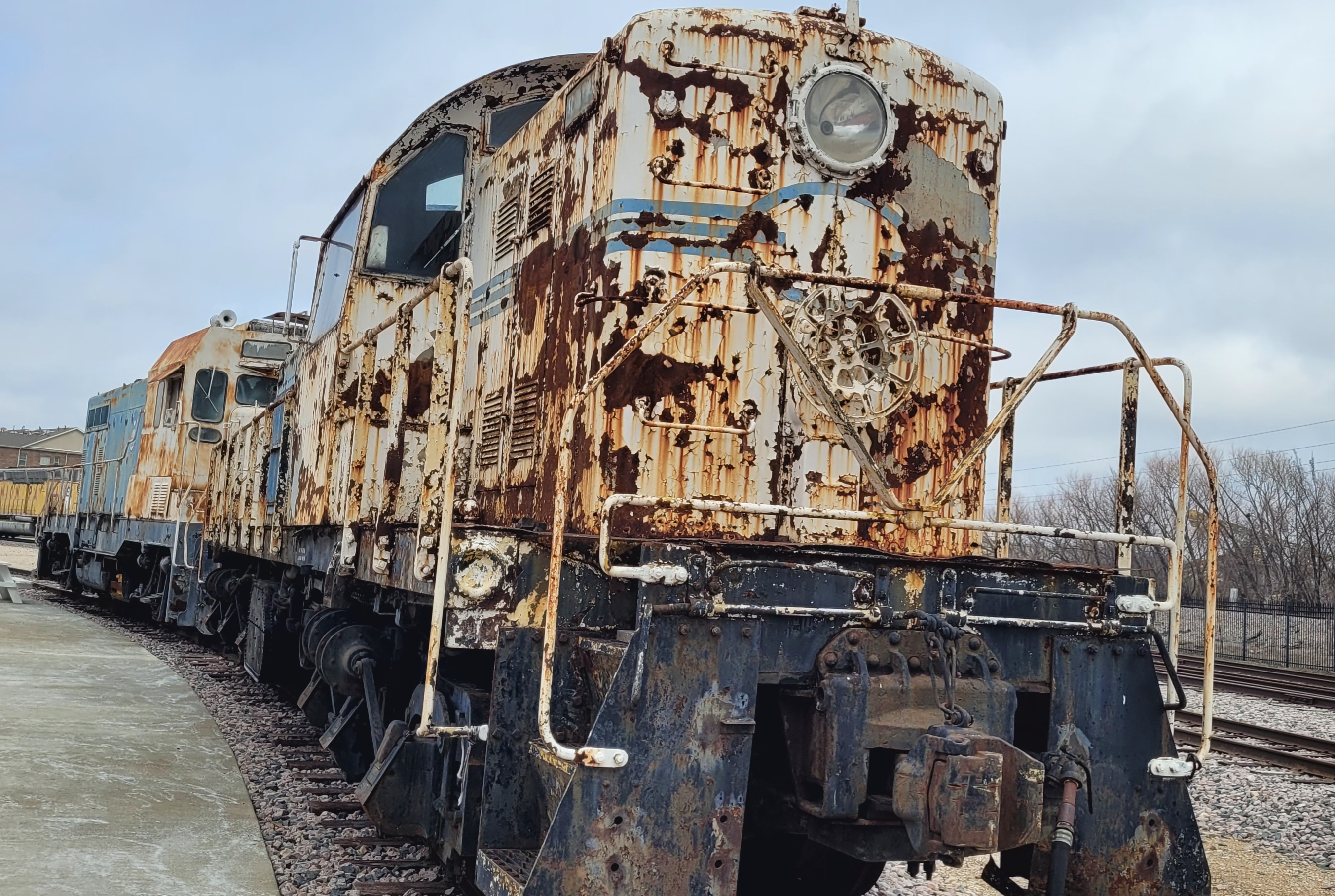
US Army ALCO RSD-1 in derelict condition (on the exterior, the locomotive is operational)

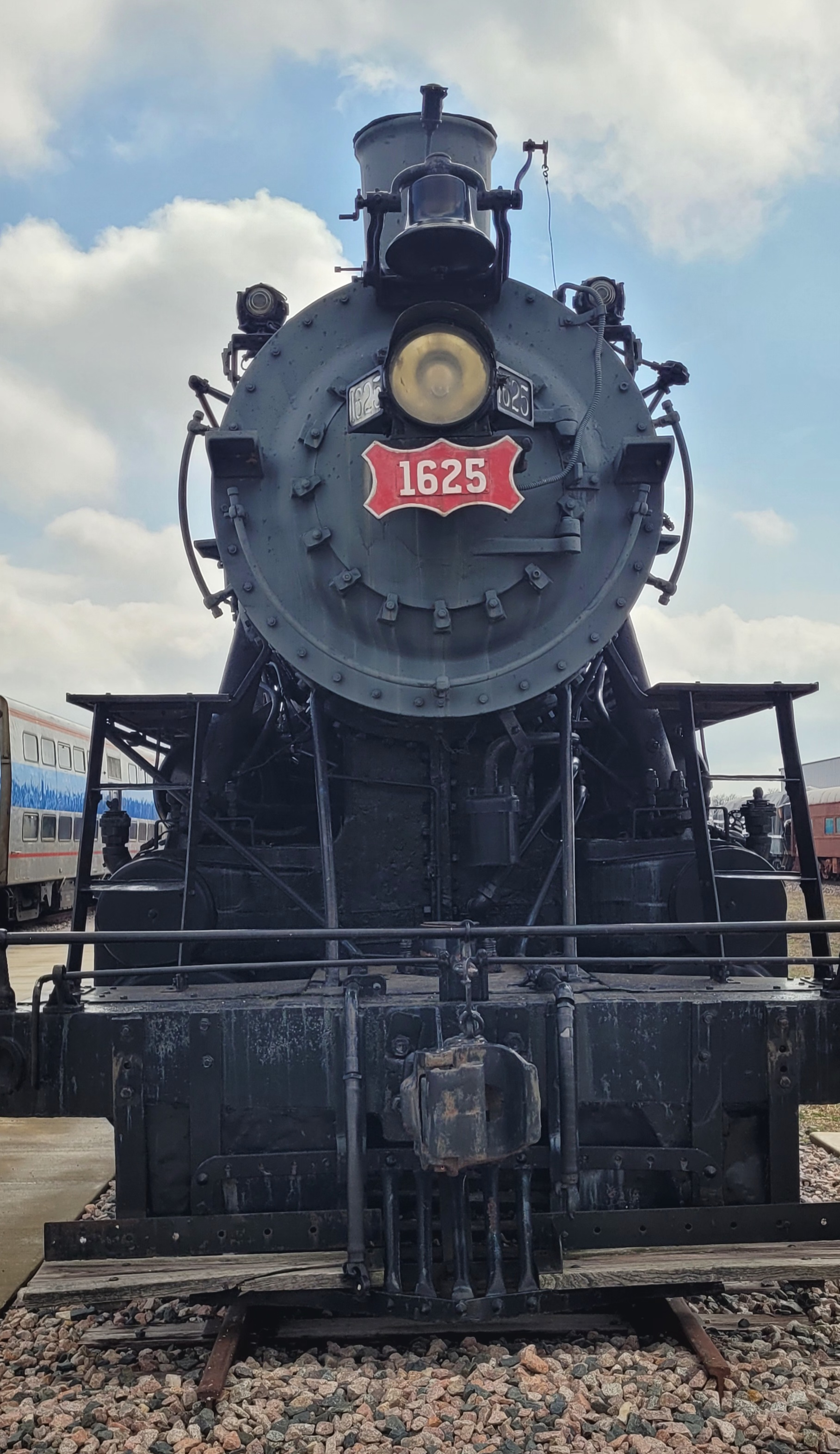
Front of SLSF 1625

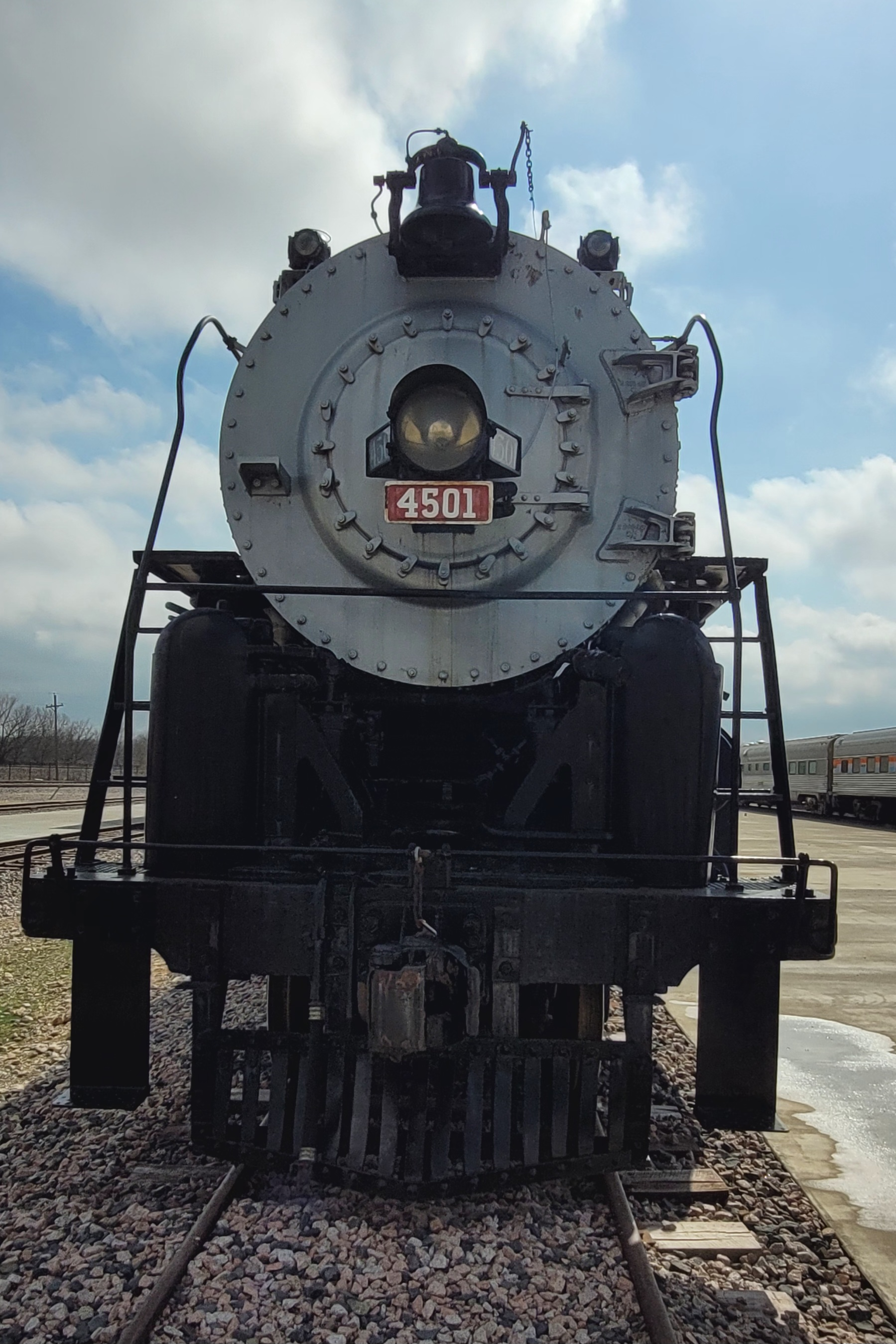
Front of SLSF 4501

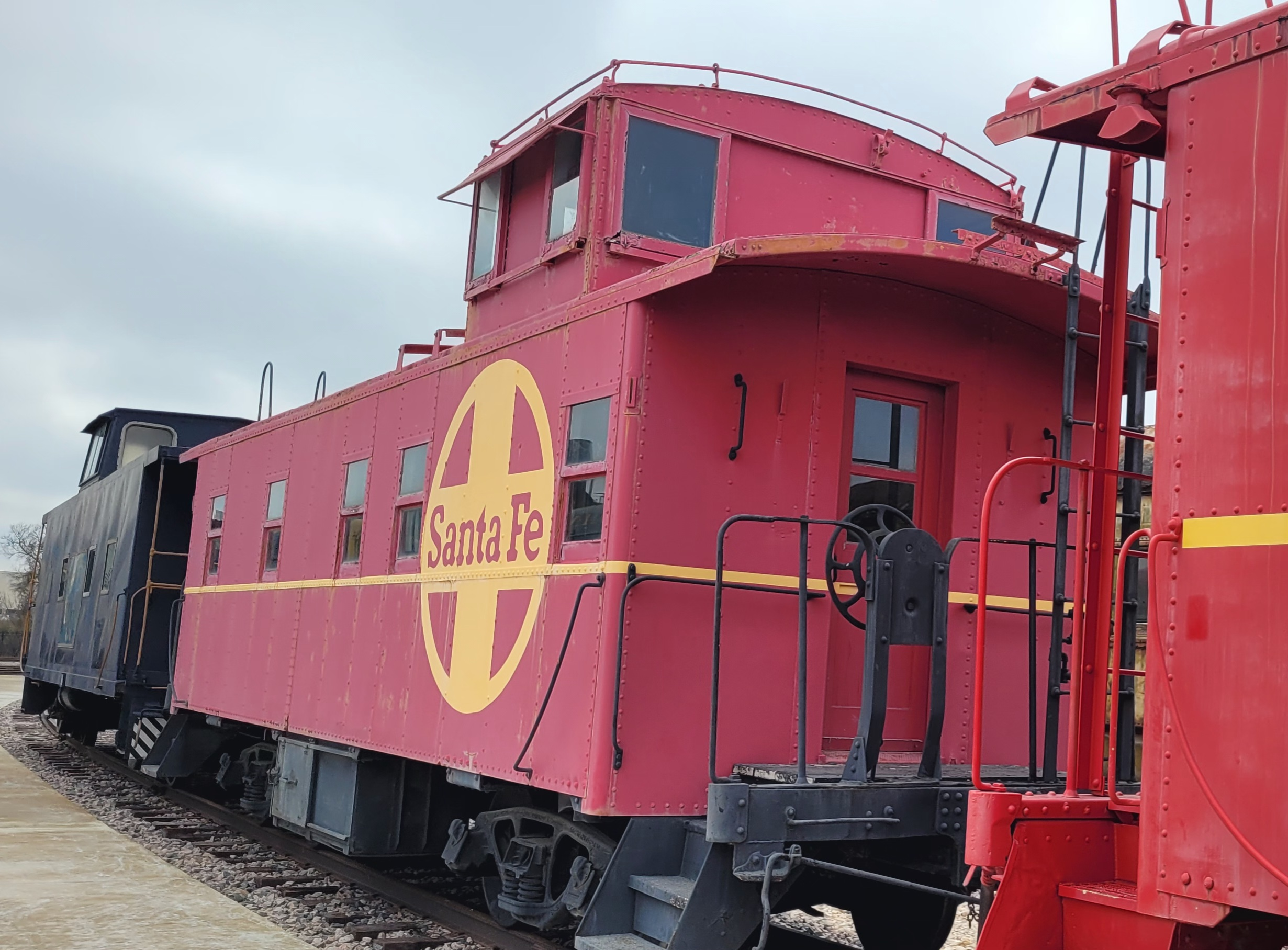
ATSF Caboose 1618

== See also ==
- List of museums in North Texas
