= Challenger (train) =

Former passenger train operated by the Union Pacific Railroad

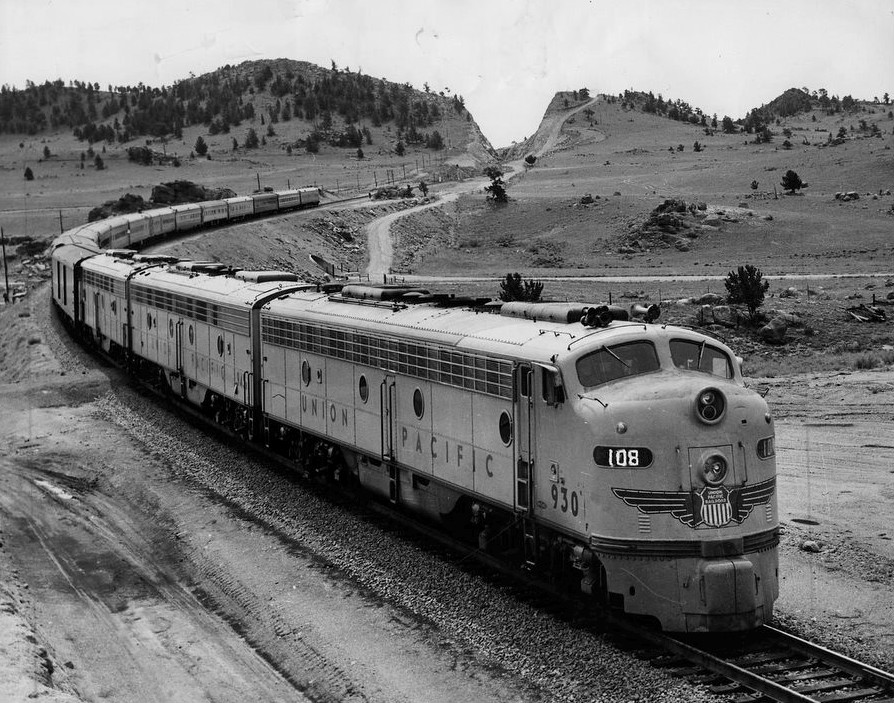
- Diesel-powered, streamlined version of the Union Pacific Challenger as it prepared to return to service in 1954

Overview
- Service type: Inter-city rail
- Status: Discontinued
- Locale: Central and Western United States
- First service: May 1936
- Last service: May 1, 1971
- Successor: Desert Wind
- Former operators: UP and CNW; UP and SP; UP and MILW

Route
- Termini: Chicago, Illinois: Los Angeles, California; Oakland, California
- Distance travelled: 2,225 miles (3,581 km) (Chicago-Los Angeles, 1954)
- Train numbers: 107 (westbound); 108 (eastbound)
- Line used: Overland Route

On-board services
- Seating arrangements: Reclining seat coaches Women-Children's coach (1946)
- Sleeping arrangements: Open sections
- Catering facilities: Dining car

Technical
- Track gauge: 4 ft 8 1/2 in (1,435 mm)

The Challengers were named passenger trains on the Union Pacific Railroad and the Chicago and North Western Railway (which was replaced in 1955 by the Milwaukee Road). The economy service ran between Chicago, Illinois, and the West Coast of the United States. The trains had full Pullman service and coach seating and were an attempt to draw Depression-Era riders back to the rails. Food service was advertised as "three meals for under a dollar a day."

During the late 1930s the Challenger fleet was among the highest-patronized of American trains, and the best revenue producers of the UP passenger fleet. Discontinued in 1947, the Challenger name reappeared in 1954 on a streamliner. When Amtrak took over the nation's passenger service in 1971, it ended the Challenger once and for all.

== History ==
In early June 1935 the Union Pacific transferred the heavyweight coaches and tourist sleeping cars of its Los Angeles Limited to a second section, the Challenger. The new train met with such success that the UP ordered 68 cars rebuilt, including 47 coaches, 16 Pullman sleeping cars, and 5 dining cars. The coaches had large reclining chairs and a new color scheme to make the interior more attractive, especially to women passengers. A lounge car was added in April of the following year.

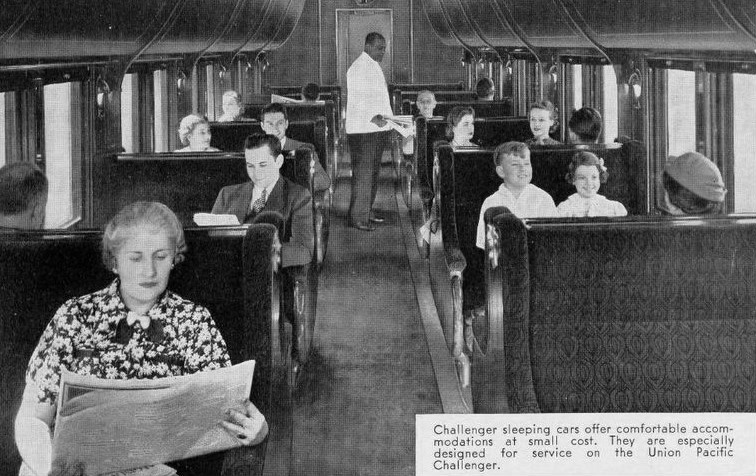
A sleeping car in day mode; the berths are folded above the seats

In May 1936 the train commenced operation between Chicago and Los Angeles, California, on its own schedule. 1937 saw the UP partnering with the Southern Pacific Railroad to add a train from Chicago to Oakland, California, a line that would take the name San Francisco Challenger (the original then became the Los Angeles Challenger).

Lounge cars were designed for single, double, and table seating. Porter service was available throughout the train, and most stations had agents on duty to assist passengers. Rare in the railroad industry, two coaches at the head of the train carried only women, one of these tailored for women with children. A registered nurse-stewardess was carried, another first. The women received $125 per month plus expenses ($2,900 in 2025).

Coach passengers had free pillows and tickets were pouched to avoid having to waken passengers during the night. Station calls were eliminated during sleeping hours, and short-haul passengers were wakened by train crews before their destinations. All bright lights were extinguished during the night (only blue lighting was used after 10:00 p.m.). Lounge rooms at the ends of the coaches were provided for those who wished to remain awake.

Increased traffic during World War II led the UP to add the Furloughee Challenger to its roster on December 31, 1944; the train's name was changed to Military Challenger on December 23, 1945, and then to Advance Challenger on April 14, 1946. The train was discontinued on June 2, 1946; the entire Challenger fleet would be taken out of service the next year after the establishment of daily service for the entire City fleet. On December 8, 1953, the C&NW and UP announced that a Challenger between Chicago and Los Angeles would return with all-streamlined equipment, and on January 10 the first lightweight trainset hit the rails. The westbound Challenger completed its run in 39 hours 30 minutes, while eastbound ran 39 hours 45 minutes. Train 107 departed Chicago at 9:00 a.m. CST and arrived Los Angeles at 10:30 p.m. PST the next day; train 108 left L.A. at 2:00 p.m. PST and arrived Chicago 7:45 CST on the morning of the second day. In February 1955 dome coaches were added to the Challenger, the first on any UP train.

Disagreement with CNW over divisions of passenger revenues led UP to switch to the Milwaukee Road (MILW) for service to Chicago's Union Station (the trains had terminated at North Western Station) beginning November 1955. The Milwaukee Road embarked upon a repainting program and all its passenger rolling stock received Union Pacific's Armour Yellow and Harbor Mist Gray colors (the MILW retained its traditional orange-and-black livery for freight units). The Milwaukee Road received that portion of the operating revenue generated between Omaha and Chicago, and furnished 25% of the equipment used on the line.

The Challenger was combined between Chicago and Omaha with the Milwaukee Road's Midwest Hiawatha and appeared in timetables as the Challenger-Midwest Hiawatha; the departure from Los Angeles switched to 10 p.m. to allow a day trip east of Omaha. This ended in Spring 1956 when, in a cost-cutting measure, the Challenger and the City of Los Angeles were combined on the City of Los Angeles schedule. The Challenger reappeared as a separate train (with its morning departure from Chicago and 2 p.m. departure from Los Angeles) in the summer and holiday seasons of 1957 and 1958, but after summer 1960 it ran on the City of Los Angeles schedule year-round.

Further consolidations occurred in the 1960s and by 1970 the Challenger, City of Denver, City of Los Angeles, City of Portland, and City of San Francisco were combined into one giant train across Wyoming, called by some the "City of Everywhere".

The dome diners were removed from the City of Portland in 1968 and the City of Los Angeles by 1970, the dome coaches and dome lounge cars remained until the coming of Amtrak. Amtrak discontinued all UP trains, save for a modified City of San Francisco (via BN to Denver, thence via UP's Overland Route to Ogden and SP to Oakland/San Francisco), when it assumed long-distance passenger rail service throughout the United States on May 1, 1971.

=== Timeline ===
- May 1936: The Challenger makes its first run between Chicago, Illinois, and Los Angeles, California.
- 1937: A second train, the San Francisco Challenger, with service between Chicago and Oakland, California is added to the lineup in cooperation with the Southern Pacific Railroad; the original train is now designated as the Los Angeles Challenger.
- November 8, 1944: The westward San Francisco Challenger jumps the tracks on a curve at 5:15 a.m. and piles into a ditch three miles west of Colfax, California. Nine people are killed and 93 injured.
- 1947: The Challenger fleet is withdrawn from service.
- October 19, 1947: San Francisco Challenger is discontinued when renamed Gold Coast
- December 8, 1953: The CNW / UP announces that the Challenger service between Chicago and Los Angeles will resume, and will employ all streamlined equipment.
- January 10, 1954: The first lightweight Challenger enters service.
- February 1955: a dome coach is added to the Challenger; a dome lounge and dome diner were added to the City of Los Angeles and City of Portland.
- November 1955: The Milwaukee Road assumes operation of the Challenger between Council Bluffs, Iowa and Chicago, operating out of Union Station.
- 1956: The Challenger and City of Los Angeles are combined during the off-season.
- 1970: Dome diners are removed from all UP passenger trains, including the Challenger. The Challenger is combined with the entire City fleet into one train.
- May 1, 1971: UP ends the Challenger train service as Amtrak takes over long-distance passenger operations in the United States.

== Equipment ==
The consist of the last train No. 107 to travel over the CNW (westbound) on October 29, 1955 included:

- EMD E8A Locomotive CNW #5029B
- Baggage UP #5648
- Sleeper UP Alpine View (14 sections)
- Pacific-series sleeper UP Pacific Beauty (10 roomettes, 6 double bedrooms)
- Diner (48 seats) CNW #6956
- Coach (48 seats) CNW #3418
- Coach (44 seats) UP #5486
- Dome-Coach UP #7000
- Coach (44 seats) UP #5470

The last train No. 108 over the CNW (eastbound) consisted of:

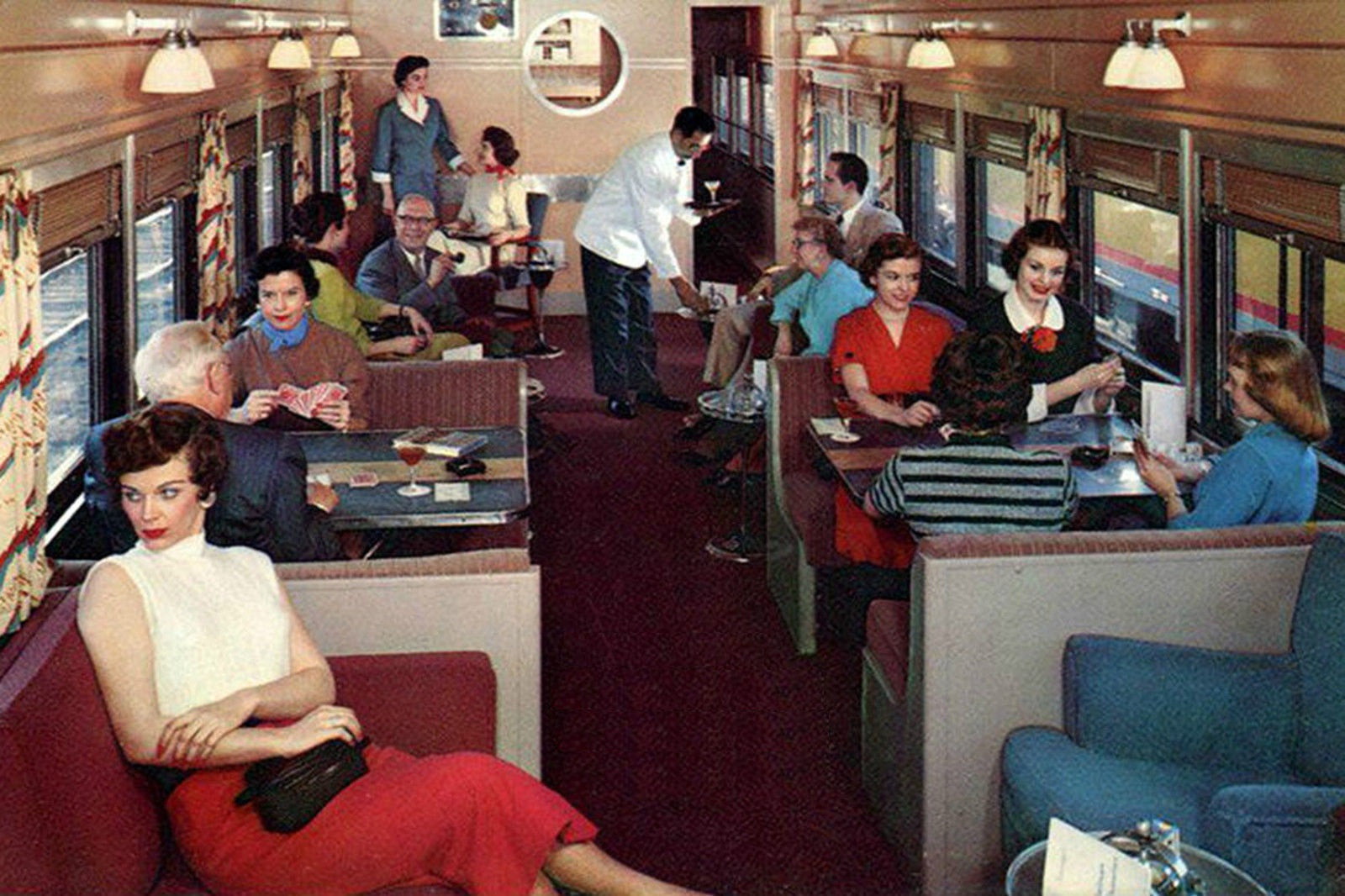
The Challenger lounge car c. 1950s

- 2-EMD E-unit Locomotives (UP pair replaced with CNW units at Omaha)
- Baggage UP #5640
- Sleeper UP Alpine Camp (14 sections)
- Pacific-series sleeper UP Pacific Mist (10 roomettes, 6 double bedrooms)
- 2-unit (articulated) Dormitory-Kitchen-Diner (48 seats) UP #5101 (taken off at Omaha)
- Lounge car UP #1517 (taken off at Omaha)
- Coach (44 seats) UP #5484 (taken off at Omaha)
- Diner (48 seats) CNW #6956 (taken on at Omaha)
- Dome-Coach UP #7002
- Coach (44 seats) UP #5478

== Dining aboard the Challenger ==
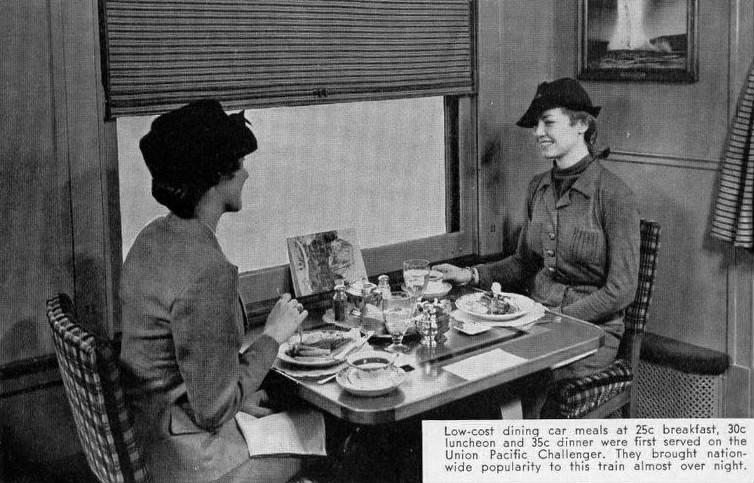
The diner, 1930s

The meals served in the Challenger's dining cars, while basic (definitely not the first-class fare found aboard the UP's streamliners, where a single meal might cost as much as $1.25) were ample, served on distinctive china and in portions large enough to satisfy even the heartiest traveler's appetite. Even as late as 1954 the meal selections were priced with the budget-conscious traveler in mind: breakfast cost 65¢, lunch was 85¢, and dinner could be had for $1.00.

== Other railroad uses of the name Challenger ==
The Challenger name has also been applied to the 4-6-6-4 type steam-driven locomotives, the first of which were designed by the UP and built by the American Locomotive Company between 1936 and 1943. Best known among these is Union Pacific 3985, one of 105 Challengers built for the railroad. Originally a part of the Union Pacific Heritage Fleet, it was taken out of service in 2010 and subsequently retired in 2020. In November 2022, it was donated to the Railroading Heritage of Midwest America, where it is now being restored to operational condition.

The dome car now called Challenger was built in 1958 by Pullman-Standard as UP dome coach #7015, the last such car built. It was reacquired by Union Pacific in 1989 and today operates as part of employee and other special trains.

== See also ==
- Passenger train service on the Chicago, Milwaukee, St. Paul and Pacific Railroad
- Passenger train service on the Chicago and North Western Railway
- Passenger train service on the Southern Pacific Railroad
- Passenger train service on the Union Pacific Railroad
