= Pacific series (railcar) =

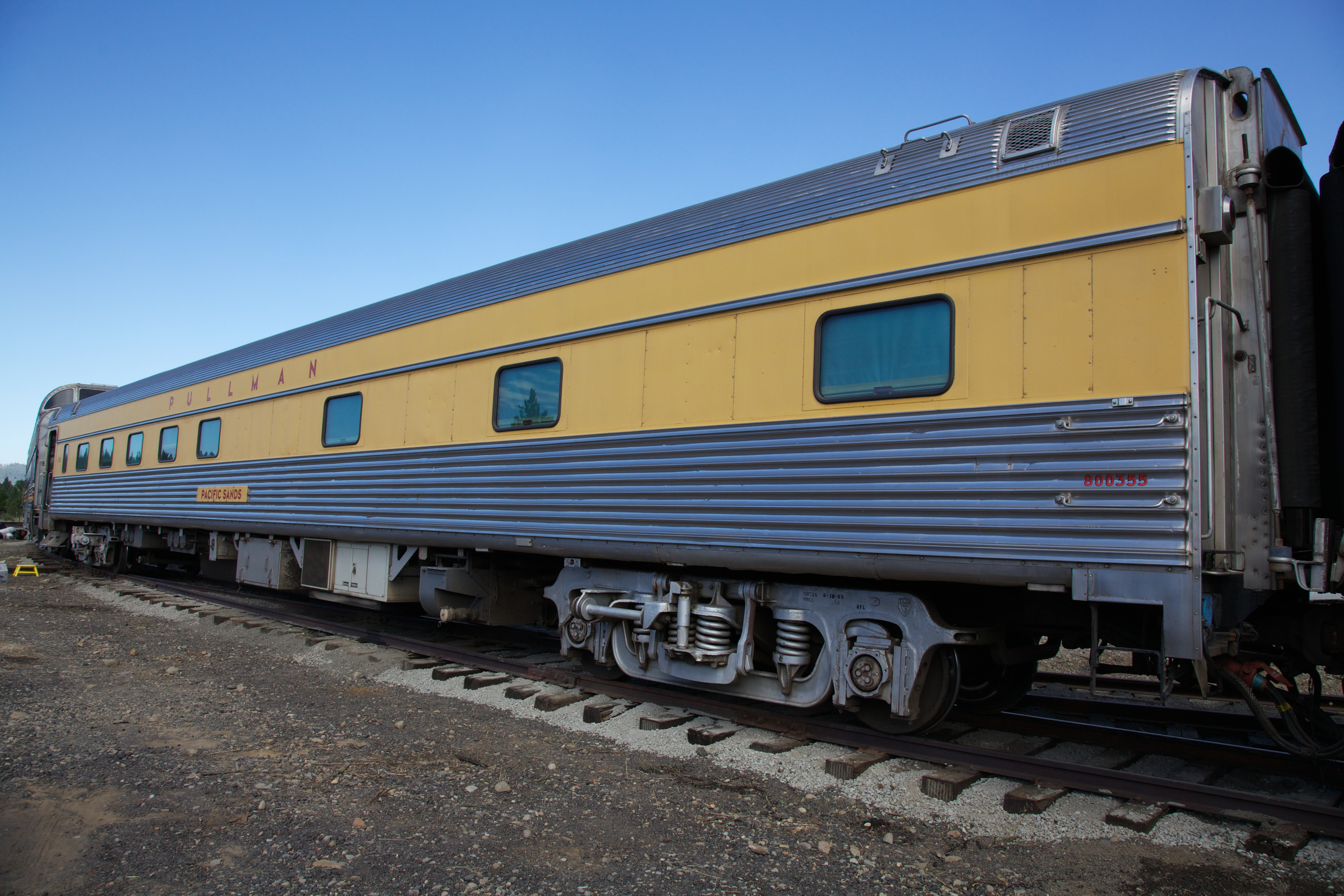
- The Pacific Sands, formerly UP #1437, in excursion service in 2010.
- In service: 1949–present
- Manufacturer: Budd Company
- Order no.: Lot 9660.039
- Constructed: 1949–1950
- Number built: 50
- Diagram: Pullman Plan 9522
- Capacity: 22: 10 roomettes and 6 bedrooms
- Operators: Union Pacific Railroad (1949–1971); Milwaukee Road (1969–1971); Amtrak (1971–present)

Specifications
- Car body construction: Shotwelded stainless steel
- Car length: 85 feet (26 m)
- HVAC: Steam heat, electro-mechanical air conditioning
- Bogies: 41-CUDO-11
- Braking system: HSCE D-22 BR disc brakes
- Track gauge: 4 ft 8 1/2 in (1,435 mm)

The Pacific series is a fleet of fifty lightweight streamlined sleeping cars built by the Budd Company for the Union Pacific Railroad in 1949–1950. Each car contained ten roomettes and six double bedrooms. Union Pacific sold several to the Chicago, Milwaukee, St. Paul and Pacific Railroad (the "Milwaukee Road") in the late 1960s; Amtrak purchased most of the fleet in the early 1970s. Several remain in use as business cars.

== Design ==
After World War II the 10-roomette 6-double bedroom (colloquially the "10-6 sleeper") design proved popular in the United States, with 682 such cars manufactured. All fifty Pacific series cars were built on Budd lot number 9660.039, and allocated Pullman Plan 9522. In this design the ten roomettes were numbered 1-10 and split down the middle by a hallway, while all six double bedrooms (designated A-F) were off to one side. A bathroom and porter's room were located across from each other at the vestibule end of the car. The car sides were corrugated instead of smooth, which was uncommon for Union Pacific equipment.

== Service history ==
Budd delivered the fifty cars between December 1949 and June 1950; the "largest class of sleepers on the Union Pacific rails." The Union Pacific used the Pacific series on various overnight streamliners in the 1950s and 1960s. One car, Pacific Empire, was written off after a rear-end collision at Wyuta, Wyoming in November 1951. The Milwaukee Road purchased five from the Union Pacific in June 1969 in order to equalise the per diem payments on their jointly-operated Overland Route passenger services. The final iteration of the Union Pacific's "City of Everywhere" (the joint operation of the Challenger, City of Denver, City of Los Angeles, City of Portland, and City of San Francisco) included four Pacific-series sleeping cars, three from the Union Pacific and one from the Milwaukee Road.

Between 1971–1974 Amtrak purchased 43 of the remaining 44 Pacific-series cars from the Union Pacific fleet. Most were retired from service in the mid-1990s; several Amtrak rebuilt as crew dormitory cars and those remained in service into the 2000s. One, Pacific Cape, remains in use as a business car. The Union Pacific retained Pacific Domain, renamed Cabarton, as a staff car. The Milwaukee Road's five cars were all sold to Mexico in 1971 and 1972.
