= 1939 in rail transport =

This article lists events related to rail transport that occurred in 1939.

== Events ==
=== January ===
- January 15 – Interurban trains begin service across the San Francisco–Oakland Bay Bridge and half of all San Francisco Municipal Railway streetcars are routed to the Transbay Terminal to allow for connections.
- January – Electro-Motive Corporation introduces the SW1.

=== February ===
- February – Electro-Motive Corporation introduces the NW2.

=== March ===
- March 8 – Edward Engel succeeds Samuel T. Bledsoe as president of Atchison, Topeka and Santa Fe Railway following Bledsoe's death.
- March – Electro-Motive Corporation introduces the EMC E3.

=== April ===
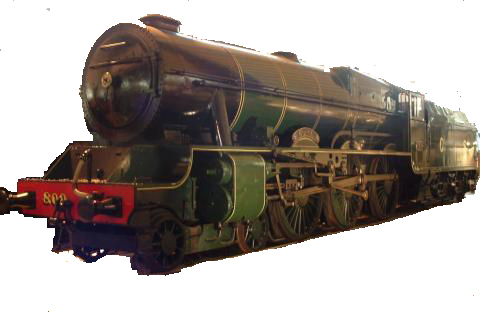
First GSR Class 800, No. 800 Maedhbh, Ireland's most powerful locomotive

- April – Great Southern Railways in the Republic of Ireland introduce first Class 800 4-6-0, the largest and most powerful steam locomotives ever to run in Ireland.
- April 22 – The IND World's Fair Line of the New York City Subway opens for the first of two seasons serving the 1939 New York World's Fair, where a British LMS Coronation Class steam locomotive is among the displays.
- April 27 – Cecil B. DeMille’s movie Union Pacific, the story of the building of the transcontinental railroad, premieres in Union Pacific's home town of Omaha, Nebraska. During its production the studio used so many trains that a railroad operating permit was required from the Interstate Commerce Commission. After the premiere, a 15-car train of period equipment tours the country promoting the movie.
- April 30 – The first passenger train to be equipped with fluorescent lighting throughout, the General Pershing Zephyr of the Chicago, Burlington and Quincy Railroad, is placed in scheduled service between St. Louis and Kansas City.

=== May ===
- May – Union Pacific, Southern Pacific and Santa Fe passenger trains in Los Angeles, California, are united into a single terminal as Los Angeles Union Passenger Terminal is opened.
- May 17 – George VI and Queen Elizabeth arrive at Wolfe's Cove, Quebec, to begin a tour of Canada; the tour train is pulled by Canadian Pacific Railway 4-6-4 locomotives 2850 and 2851, earning the class the name Royal Hudson.
- May 23 – Harvey C. Couch succeeds Charles E. Johnston as president of Kansas City Southern Railway.

=== June ===
- June 1 – Mount McKinley Hotel opens, bringing tourists via the Alaska Railroad to the Denali area.
- June – Union Pacific Railroad retires the M-10001 streamliner trainset from City of Portland service, replacing it with the M-10002 trainset from the City of Los Angeles service.

=== July ===
- July 16 – The world's first diesel-powered rack locomotive enters service on the Manitou and Pike's Peak Railway.

=== August ===
- August 11 – C. P. Couch succeeds his brother Harvey C. Couch as president of Kansas City Southern Railway.
- August 12 – City of San Francisco derailment on the Southern Pacific Railroad near Harney, Nevada, due to sabotage whose perpetrator is never discovered.

=== September ===
- September 1
  - British Government takes control of railways as a wartime measure; start of a 4-day evacuation of children by rail from major cities (over 600,000 from London).
  - The Østfold Line in Norway takes electric traction into use between Kornsjø and the Swedish border.
- September 10 – The Østfold Line in Norway takes electric traction into use between Halden and Kornsjø.
- September 24 – The Østfold Line in Norway takes electric traction into use between Kolbotn and Ås.
- September 30 – New York State Railways closes the University Line in Syracuse, New York.

=== October ===
- October – Charles Eugene Denney steps down from the presidency of the Erie Railroad.

=== November ===
- November 22 – The Syracuse Lines of New York State Railways are reorganized as the Syracuse Transit Corporation.
- November 25 – Electro-Motive Corporation's EMD FT 103, “The Diesel That Did It” according to David P. Morgan, begins an 83,764 mile barnstorming tour.
- November – Electro-Motive Corporation introduces the E6.
- November – Electro-Motive Corporation introduces the NW3.

=== December ===
- December 1 – The Atlantic Coast Line Railroad inaugurates the Champion passenger train between New York, New York, and Miami, Florida.
- December 3 – The Florida East Coast Railway introduces the Henry M. Flagler passenger train between Miami and Jacksonville, Florida.
- December 10 – The St. Louis–San Francisco Railway (the "Frisco") introduces its first streamlined passenger train, the Firefly, between Kansas City, Missouri and Oklahoma City, Oklahoma.
- December 22 – Genthin, Germany: collision when train D180 drives into previous but delayed and overcrowded train D10 from Berlin to Cologne. 278 killed, 453 injured, one of the most serious train accidents in Germany. On the same day near, Markdorf, Germany: a goods train and a special passenger train collide head-on after various operational errors, bad weather, and wartime blackouts. 101 killed, 47 injured.
- December 29 – The Pioneer Zephyr streamliner trainset crosses the one million mile (1.6 million km) mark in revenue service near Council Bluffs, Iowa.

=== Unknown date ===
- Trans-Iranian Railway completed, joining the capital Tehran to the Persian Gulf and the Caspian Sea (1394 km (865 miles)).
- Hale Holden steps down as chairman of the board of directors for the Southern Pacific Company, the parent company of the Southern Pacific Railroad. After Holden's departure, the position is nonexistent until 1964.
- Union Pacific Railroad's M-10003-6 streamliner power cars are upgraded from two-car, 2,400 hp sets to three three-car, 3,600 hp sets.
- The General Pershing Zephyr debuts on the Chicago, Burlington and Quincy Railroad between Kansas City and St. Louis, Missouri.
- New Zealand Railways introduce J class 4-8-2 steam locomotives built by North British Locomotive Works in Glasgow, Scotland.
- American Car and Foundry's Berwick, Pennsylvania, plant switches to construction of military tanks.

== Births ==
=== August births ===
- August 2 – John W. Snow, chairman and chief executive officer of CSX Transportation, then United States Secretary of the Treasury.

=== December births ===
- December 28 – Philip Anschutz, Colorado financier who orchestrates the purchase of the Southern Pacific Railroad by the Denver and Rio Grande Western Railroad.

=== Unknown date births ===
- Paul Tellier, president of Canadian National Railway 1992–2002, is born.

== Deaths ==
=== March deaths ===
- March 8 – Samuel T. Bledsoe, president of Atchison, Topeka and Santa Fe Railway 1933–1939 (born 1868).

=== Unknown date deaths ===
- Carl Raymond Gray, president of Union Pacific Railroad 1920–1937 (born 1867)
