= 1941 in rail transport =

This article lists events related to rail transport that occurred in 1941.

== Events ==
=== January events ===
- January 4 – Syracuse Transit Corporation ends streetcar service in Syracuse, New York, with the closure of the last four lines.

=== February events ===
- February 10–March 11 – British Army constructs a 60 cm narrow gauge railway from Kassala in Sudan 90 km east to Tessenei in Eritrea to support military advance.
- February 11 – The first Gold record is presented to Glenn Miller for Chattanooga Choo Choo.

=== March events ===
- March – Alco-GE build the first ALCO RS-1 road switcher. This model will have the longest production run of any diesel locomotive for the North American market.
- March 31 – The Southern Railway (U.S.) introduces the Southerner passenger train between New York City and New Orleans, Louisiana.

=== April events ===
- April 28 – The Supreme Court of the United States unanimously rules that, based on the Interstate Commerce Act of 1887, African American passengers are entitled to equal accommodations on all passenger trains in the U.S.

=== May events ===
- May 4 – Portland, Maine streetcar system ceases operations.
- May 22 – Canadian Pacific Railway's Angus Shops in Montreal produce its first tank as part of the war effort for World War II.

=== June events ===
- June 13 – The Hauerseter–Gardermoen Line in Norway is opened by the Luftwaffe during the German occupation of Norway.

=== July events ===
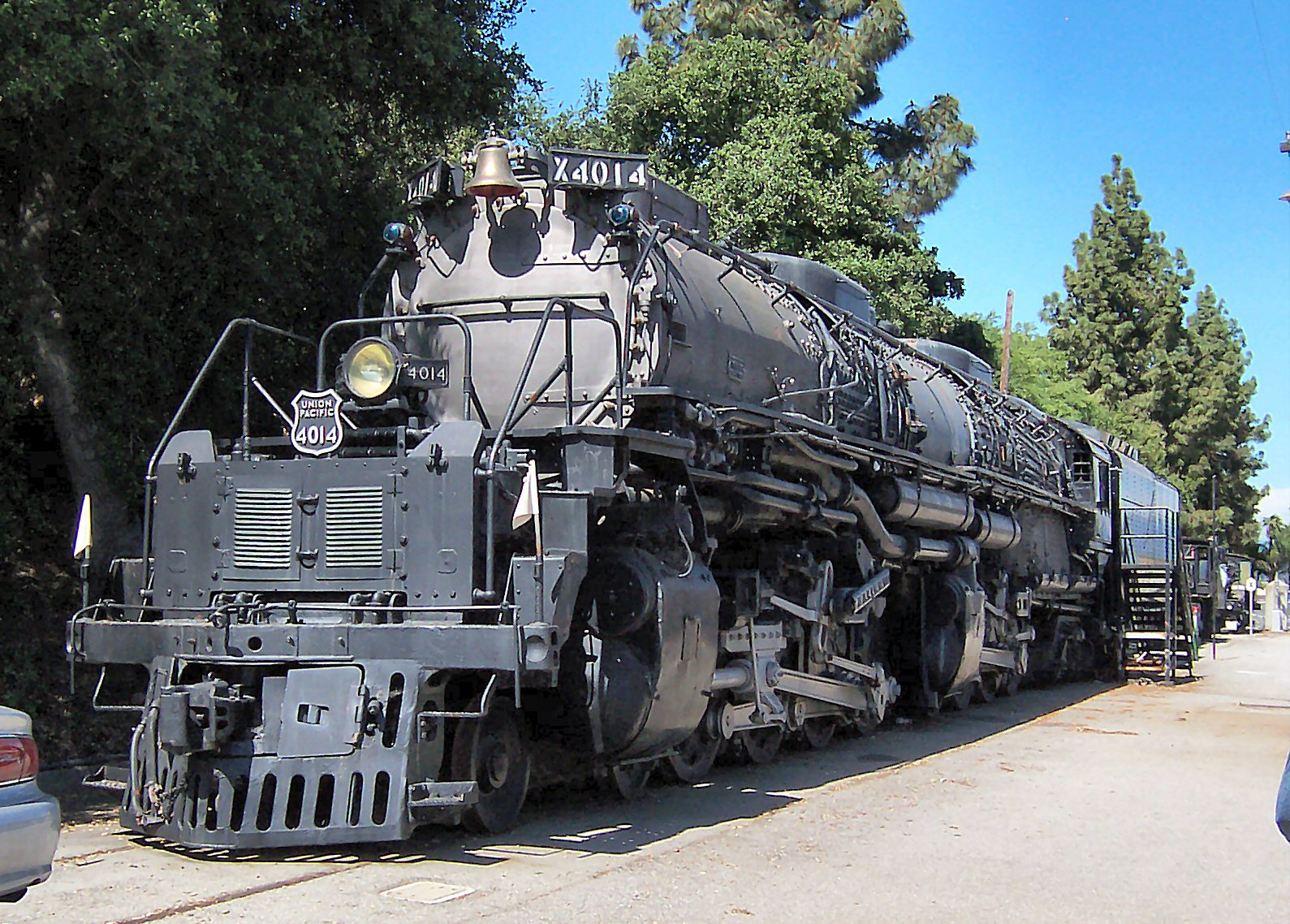
UP "Big Boy" #4014 on display (in Pomona, CA)

- July 4 – In Tokyo, Japan, the Teito Rapid Transit Authority is established.
- July 7 – Deutsche Reichsbahn accepts delivery of an experimental "V-8" steam locomotive from Henschel & Son's works. Nominally a 2-8-2, the locomotive has four sets of two cylinders in a 90 degree "V" shape on the ends of each drive axle, alternating from side to side. Captured by the Allies, it will be tested in the U.S. before being scrapped in 1952.
- July 11 – Spain's national railway, RENFE, is formed.
- July – Union Pacific Railroad's M-10002 streamliner trainset is removed from active service on the City of Portland and placed in storage.

=== August events ===
- August 12 – Meitetsu Nagoya Line, Higashi-Biwajima to Atsuta Jingu-mae route officially completed in Aichi Prefecture, Japan, and Meitetsu Gifu to Toyohashi route direct commuter train service to start from May 1948.
- August 14 – Union Pacific Railroad's M-10001 streamliner trainset is sold for scrap.

=== September events ===
- September 5 – The first 4-8-8-4 "Big Boy" steam locomotive is delivered from Alco to the Union Pacific Railroad at Omaha.
- September 7 – The last scheduled train runs on the Maine narrow gauge Bridgton and Saco River Railroad.

=== October events ===
- October 1 – After a bankruptcy, Spokane International Railway is reorganized as Spokane International Railroad.
- October 26 – The Illinois Central Railroad introduces the Land O'Corn passenger train between Chicago, Illinois and Waterloo, Iowa. The new train uses "Motorailer" diesel multiple units manufactured by American Car and Foundry.
- October – Robert E. Woodruff becomes president of the Erie Railroad.

=== November events ===
- November 17 – The Prospector multiple unit passenger trainset debuts on the Denver and Rio Grande Western Railroad in operating between Denver, Colorado, and Salt Lake City, Utah.

=== December events ===
- December – British War Department takes over operation of Trans-Iranian Railway from Bandar Shahpur to Teheran to assist in sending wartime supplies to the USSR.
- December 7 – The New York Central Railroad, with much fanfare, launches a new Empire State Express. The bombing of Pearl Harbor puts an immediate damper on the planned festivities.
- December 9 – Chesapeake and Ohio Railway officials accept the first 2-6-6-6 Allegheny steam locomotive from the Lima Locomotive Works. Despite many claims made by Alco, Union Pacific Railroad and others for the 4-8-8-4 Big Boy, the Alleghenies are the largest steam locomotives ever built for service in the United States.
- December 19 – The Baltimore and Ohio Railroad extends the Columbian passenger train from Jersey City-Washington to Jersey City-Chicago.

=== Unknown date events ===
- The first of over 8,000 Kriegslokomotive 2-10-0 steam locomotives is introduced into service on the Deutsche Reichsbahn.
- The Heisler Locomotive Works produces the last Heisler locomotive.
- The Hollywood, a lounge car built for use on the City of Los Angeles becomes the first passenger car whose interior is built entirely out of synthetic materials. The car's interior features the newly invented materials of Formica and naugahyde.
- General Motors Electro-Motive Division introduces the EMD TR1.
- Armand Mercier succeeds Angus Daniel McDonald as president of the Southern Pacific Company, parent company of the Southern Pacific Railroad.
- Sacramento Northern Railway ceases interurban services.

== Deaths ==
=== February deaths ===
- February 1 – William Gibbs McAdoo, American lawyer, statesman and Director General of Railroads during World War I (born 1863).

=== April deaths ===
- April 5 – Nigel Gresley, Chief mechanical engineer of the London and North Eastern Railway 1923–1941 (born 1876).
- April 16 – Josiah Stamp, Chairman of the London, Midland and Scottish Railway 1926-1941 (born 1880) (in an air raid).

=== Unknown date deaths ===
- Angus Daniel McDonald, president of the Southern Pacific Company, parent company of the Southern Pacific Railroad, 1932–1941 (born 1878).
- Alonzo C. Mather, founder of Mather Stock Car Company, designed the first widely recognized humane stock car (born 1848).
- Frederick Methvan Whyte, mechanical engineer for the New York Central railroad, creator of Whyte notation for the classification of steam locomotives (born 1865).
