= 1936 in rail transport =

This article lists events related to rail transport that occurred in 1936.

== Events ==
=== January events ===
- January 1 –
  - Hebikubo Station (蛇窪駅), in Shinagawa, Tokyo, Japan, is renamed to Togoshi-kōen Station (戸越公園駅, Togoshi-kōen eki).
  - Société des Chemins de fer vicinaux du Mayumbe, the company that built and operated the Mayumbe line beginning in 1898, is merged with the Office des Transports Coloniaux (OTRACO).
- January 13 – Première of British documentary film Night Mail made by the GPO Film Unit.
- January 29 – The Sørland Line in Norway takes electric traction into use between Kongsberg and Hjuksebø.

=== March events ===
- March 20 – The 1936 flood ends train service on the Maine Central Railroad Rangeley branch north of Rumford, Maine.
- March 25 – The 200-inch (5.1 m) mirror blank for the Palomar Observatory begins its cross-country trip aboard a special railroad car.

=== May events ===
- May 7 – The Bratsberg Line in Norway takes electric traction into use.
- May 11 – Deutsche Reichsbahn-Gesellschaft's BR 05 class locomotive number 05 002 sets the world's speed record for steam locomotives at 200.4 km/h (124.5 mph) on a run between Hamburg and Berlin.
- May 12 – The Atchison, Topeka and Santa Fe Railway inaugurates the all-diesel powered Super Chief passenger train between Chicago, Illinois, and Los Angeles, California.
- May 15 – The first City of Los Angeles passenger train makes its debut, using the streamliner trainset M-10002, running from Chicago, Illinois, to Los Angeles, California, on the Chicago and North Western Railway and the Union Pacific Railroad.
- May 17 – Illinois Central’s streamliner Green Diamond makes its debut, running between Chicago, Illinois and St. Louis, Missouri.
- May 20 – The first diesel locomotive rolls out of EMC’s LaGrange plant in McCook, Illinois: a 100-ton, 600 horsepower (450 kW) switcher built for the Santa Fe Railroad.
- May – Union Pacific Railroad takes delivery of the first of the M-10003-6 streamliner power cars.

=== June events ===
- June 14 – The M-10004 streamliner trainset enters service on the City of San Francisco passenger train.
- June 18 – The first City of Denver passenger train makes its debut running from Chicago, Illinois, to Denver, Colorado, on the Chicago and North Western Railway and the Union Pacific Railroad.

=== July events ===
- July 15 – The New York Central introduces the Mercury passenger train between Detroit, Michigan, and Cleveland, Ohio.

=== August events ===
- August 1 – The New Haven Railroad tests a new streamliner: a two-car Besler steam motor train.

=== September events ===
- September 13 – Last regular passenger trains operate on Ashover Light Railway, the last steam-worked public passenger services on a narrow gauge railway in England.
- September 18 – Canadian Pacific Railway 4-4-4 number 3003 pulls a newly designed lightweight passenger train at 112.5 mph (181 km/h) near Saint-Télesphore, Quebec, Canada.

=== October events ===
- October – Chicago, Burlington and Quincy Railroad inaugurates the Sam Houston Zephyr passenger train.

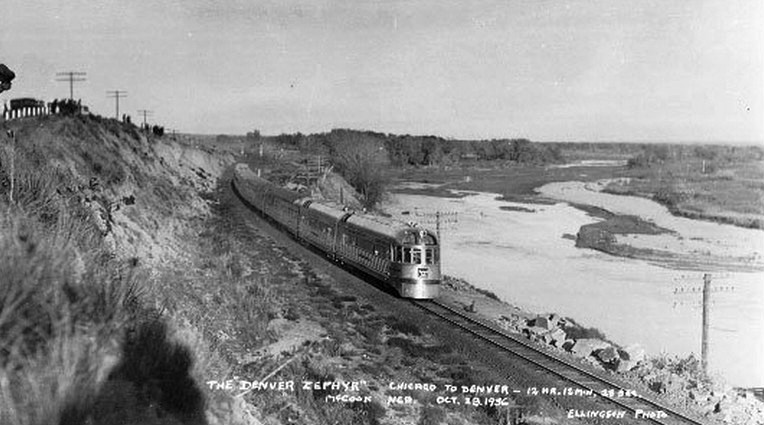
October – Special nonstop Chicago–Denver run in advance of introducing California Zephyr service

- October 23 – One of the new ten-car Denver Zephyr trainsets makes a special run nonstop from Chicago to Denver, breaking the 1934 speed record of the Pioneer Zephyr between the two cities.

=== November events ===
- November 8 – Chicago, Burlington and Quincy Railroad inaugurates the Denver Zephyr passenger train.

=== December events ===
- December 9 – The Østfold Line in Norway takes electric traction into use between Oslo East Station and Ljan.
- December 18 – The Twin Cities Zephyr, an articulated trainset, is placed into service between Chicago, Illinois, and Minneapolis-St. Paul.
- December 20 – Chicago, Burlington and Quincy Railroad inaugurates the Ozark State Zephyr passenger train.

=== Unknown date events ===
- Illinois Central's Illinois Central 121 trainset is built by Pullman-Standard .
- Bruce Church, T. R. Merrill, Gene Harden and Ken Nutting form the Growers Ice Company to ship bulk carloads of lettuce by rail from Salinas, California
- Southern Railway (Great Britain) signs exclusive 10-year contract with English Electric for the supply of traction equipment for its electric multiple units. This will be twice renewed and 5,500 EE507 traction motors will be supplied under it.

== Births ==
- January 12 – William McAlpine, British businessman and railway enthusiast (died 2018).

== Deaths ==
=== June deaths ===
- June 8 – Alfred de Glehn, English-born French designer of steam locomotives (born 1848).

=== November deaths ===
- November 9 – Henry Clay Hall, American commissioner for Interstate Commerce Commission beginning in 1914, chairman of same 1917-1928 (born 1860).
- November 22 – Oris Paxton Van Sweringen, American financier who, with his brother Mantis, controlled the Nickel Plate Road and other eastern United States railroads (born 1879).
