= City of Denver (train) =

Streamlined passenger train of the Union Pacific Railroad

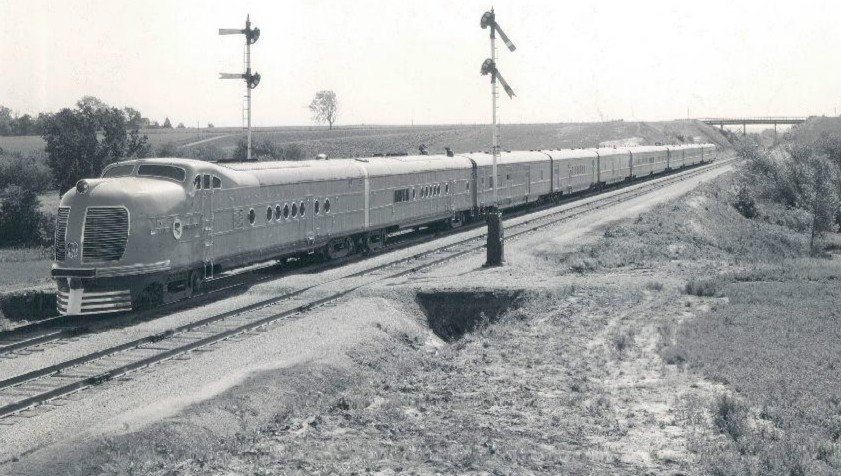
- The City of Denver in 1940.

Overview
- Service type: Inter-city rail
- Status: Discontinued
- Locale: Western United States
- First service: June 18, 1936
- Last service: April 30, 1971
- Successor: Pioneer
- Former operators: Union Pacific Railroad; Chicago and North Western Railway; Milwaukee Road

Route
- Termini: Chicago, Illinois; Denver, Colorado
- Stops: 13 (westbound); 12 (eastbound)
- Distance travelled: 560 mi (900 km)
- Average journey time: 17 hours (Chicago - Denver); 16 hours 15 minutes (Denver - Chicago)
- Service frequency: Daily
- Train numbers: 111 (westbound); 112 (eastbound)

On-board services
- Seating arrangements: Reclining seat coaches
- Sleeping arrangements: Sections, roomettes and double bedrooms (1961)
- Catering facilities: Dining car
- Observation facilities: Dome lounge

Technical
- Track gauge: 4 ft 8 1/2 in (1,435 mm)
- Operating speed: 61.6 (westbound); 64.5 (eastbound)

The City of Denver was a streamlined passenger train operated by the Union Pacific Railroad between Chicago, Illinois, and Denver, Colorado. It operated between 1936 and 1971. From 1936–1955 the Chicago and North Western Railway handled the train east of Omaha, Nebraska; the Chicago, Milwaukee, St. Paul and Pacific Railroad (the "Milwaukee Road") handled it thereafter. The train was the fastest long-distance train in the United States when it debuted in 1936, covering 1,048 miles (1,687 km) in 16 hours. For almost its entire career its principal competitor was the Chicago, Burlington and Quincy Railroad's Denver Zephyr. When Amtrak assumed operation of most intercity trains in the United States in 1971, it discontinued the City of Denver, preferring to use the Burlington's route between Chicago and Denver.

On its launch in 1936 the City of Denver used a pair of articulated trainsets built by Pullman-Standard. The streamliners would remain in service until 1953, when conventional locomotive-hauled rolling stock replaced them. The City of Denver always carried both sleeping cars and coaches. A notable feature of the 1936 version of the train was the "Frontier Shack" tavern, which had the feel of a Western saloon.

== History ==
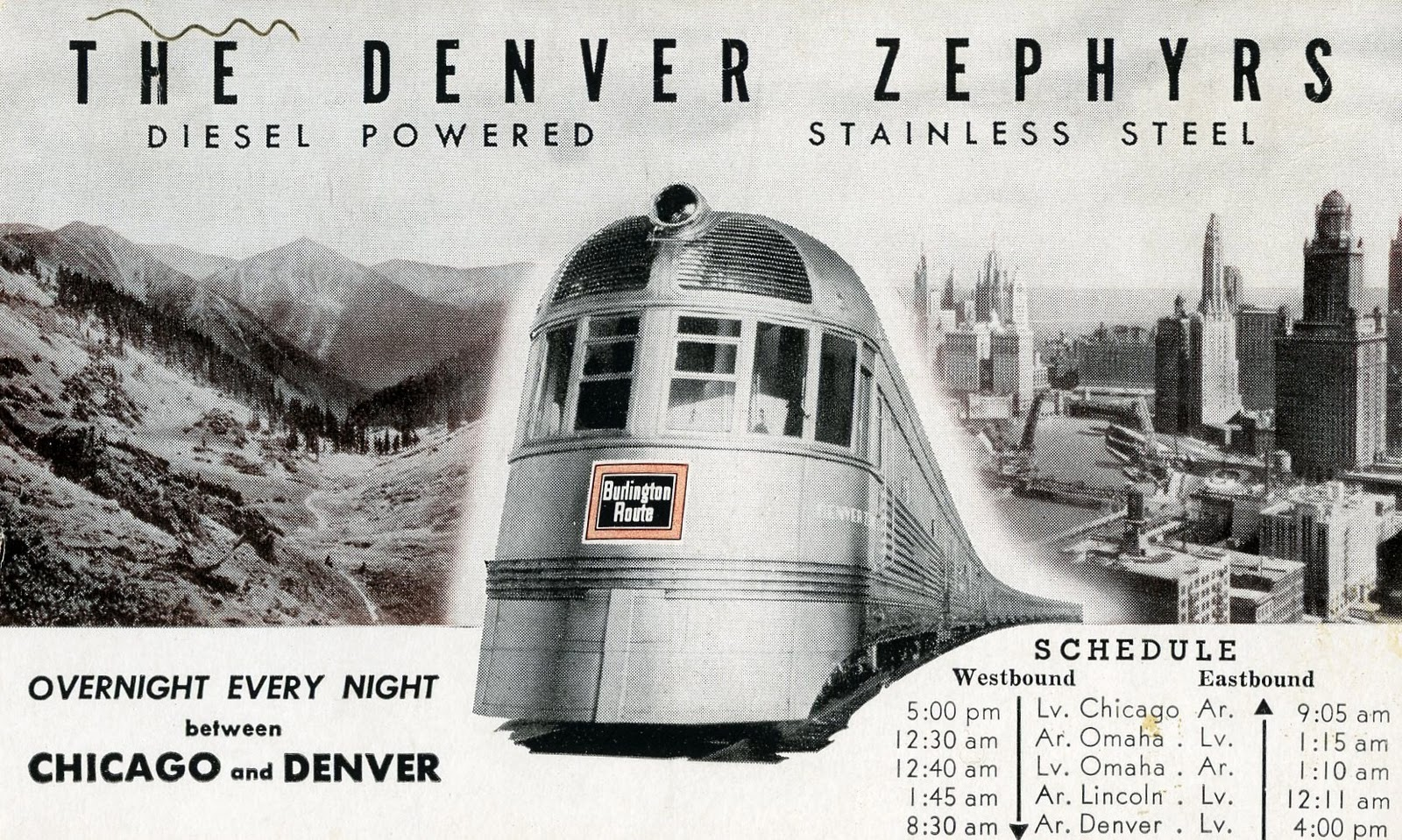
The Burlington's Denver Zephyr was the City of Denver's principal competitor on the Chicago–Denver route.

The articulated streamliners of the 1930s consisted of power cars and passenger cars semi-permanently coupled together, with the cars sharing trucks. By the end of 1935 the Union Pacific Railroad already operated four such equipment sets, each on a different route: the M-10000 (City of Salina), M-10001 (City of Portland), M-10002 (City of Los Angeles), and M-10004 (City of San Francisco). While the M-10000 made the round-trip between Kansas City, Missouri, and Salina, Kansas, in a single day, the other three sets required multiple days to run from Chicago to their respective namesakes. The infrequent departure schedule led Union Pacific to advertise a train's "sailings", as though it were an ocean liner.

In December the Union Pacific and Chicago and North Western Railway (C&NW) announced a new Chicago–Denver "high-speed" service, to be served by a pair of trainsets enabling daily service, the M-10005 and M-10006. The projected running time of 16 hours was a full nine hours faster than the best schedule at that time. The new trains had a maximum speed in excess of 100 miles per hour (160 km/h) and averaged 65.5 miles per hour (105.4 km/h) over the 1,048-mile (1,687 km) trip. This made it the fastest scheduled long-distance train in the United States. The Union Pacific emphasized that the improved schedule would "save a business day."

At the same time the Chicago, Burlington and Quincy Railroad, commonly known as the Burlington, had ordered two streamlined 10-car trainsets of its own: the Denver Zephyr, built by the Budd Company and modeled on the Pioneer Zephyr, the first articulated streamliner in the United States. While the City of Denver beat the Denver Zephyr into service, making its first run between Chicago and Denver on June 18, 1936, on May 31 the Burlington had deployed two of its existing trainsets, the original Zephyr and the Mark Twain Zephyr, on its own route between Chicago and Denver as the Advance Denver Zephyr. While as fast as the City of Denver, the three-car sets in no way compared to amenities aboard the 12-car Union Pacific streamliners, which included the "Frontier Shack" tavern, a dining-cocktail lounge, and a sleeper-lounge-observation car. The Burlington's new equipment would arrive in November. The two services operated on nearly-identical schedules. Fulfilling its early promise, the City of Denver traveled at an average speed of 66 miles per hour (106 km/h), the fastest of the Union Pacific's streamliners. (Note: According to Klein, it covered the Chicago–Omaha portion of its route in 7 hours 26 minutes at a mathematically impossible average speed of 75.3 miles per hour (121.2 km/h).)

The competition between the two trains remained unchanged for nearly twenty years. Even as it upgraded and replaced its other streamliners, Union Pacific kept the original trainsets on the route until 1953, finally introducing new lightweight equipment in 1953–1954. The following year, on October 30, 1955, the Chicago, Milwaukee, St. Paul and Pacific Railroad (the "Milwaukee Road") began handling the Union Pacific's streamliners east of Omaha, replacing the C&NW. The Burlington replaced the Denver Zephyr's equipment in 1956. With both trains sporting new equipment competition intensified. The Burlington included "Vista-Dome" dome cars on the Zephyr; within a year the Milwaukee Road's Super Domes began making appearances on the City of Denver. The Burlington also began operating a slumbercoach, an innovative economy sleeping car. Having none of its own, the Union Pacific leased two all-roomette Pennsylvania Railroad sleeping cars and billed it as "Slumbercoach service." Nevertheless, in the words of railroad historian Joe Welsh the Denver Zephyr "made mincemeat of the UP's City of Denver."

Throughout the late 1950s and 1960s the Union Pacific gradually downgraded its passenger services and consolidated trains as losses mounted. The westbound City of Denver and City of Portland began joint operation in 1959. On September 7, 1969, the Union Pacific combined five of its Chicago–West Coast streamliners into a single massive train dubbed by critics the "City of Everywhere." This train included the City of Denver, City of Kansas City, City of Los Angeles, City of Portland, and City of San Francisco. Amtrak, which took over most intercity passenger trains in the United States on May 1, 1971, kept a Chicago–Denver train but preferred the Burlington's route. The City of Denver made its last run on April 30, 1971.

== Route ==
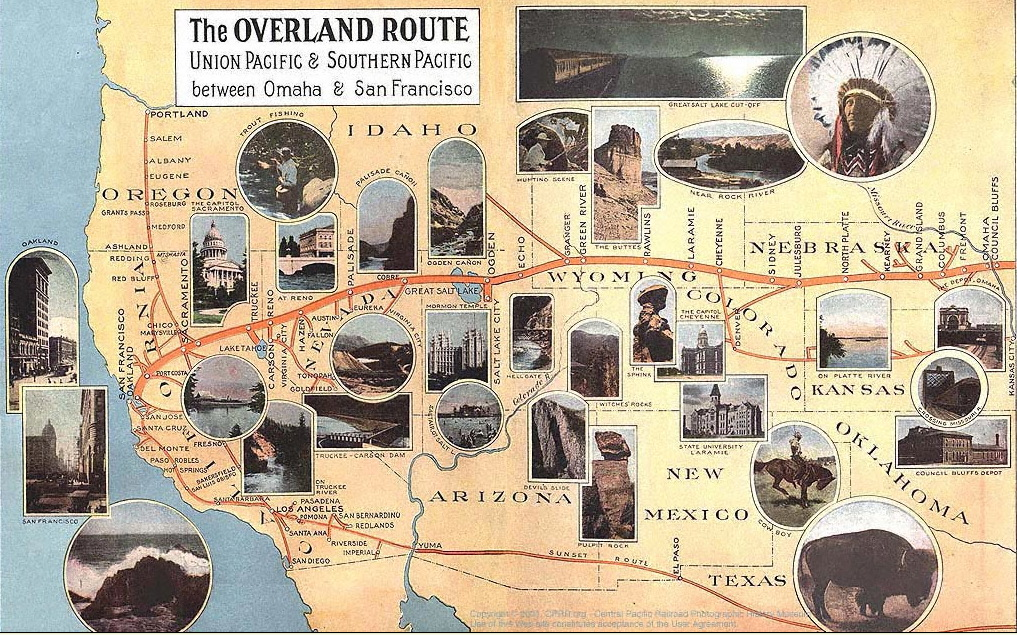
A 1908 map depicting the Union Pacific's "Overland Route."

Between 1936–1955 the City of Denver used the Chicago and North Western Railway between Chicago and Omaha. After 1955 it used the Milwaukee Road. The train's Union Pacific route west of Omaha remained unchanged for the duration. The train followed the Overland Route from Omaha to Julesburg, where it diverged southwest for Denver. In March 1950 it made the following stops west of Omaha: Columbus, Grand Island, Kearney, and North Platte in Nebraska and Julesburg in Colorado. On the C&NW it made the following stops west of Chicago, all in Iowa: Cedar Rapids, Ames, Boone, and Council Bluffs. The westbound train departed Chicago's Chicago and North Western Terminal at 5:00 PM and arrived at Denver's Union Station at 8:30 AM the following morning.

With the switch to the Milwaukee Road the train's Chicago terminus shifted to Union Station. In June 1960 the City of Denver stopped in Davis Junction (for Rockford) and Savanna in Illinois, Marion (for Cedar Rapids) and Perry in Iowa. West of Omaha the station stops were unchanged. The new routing forced new timing; the westbound City of Denver departed Chicago at 3:45 PM and arrived in Denver at 7:35 AM the following morning. Although the new route took 20 minutes longer, by an odd coincidence it was exactly the same length as the previous one, at 1,048 miles (1,687 km).

== Equipment ==
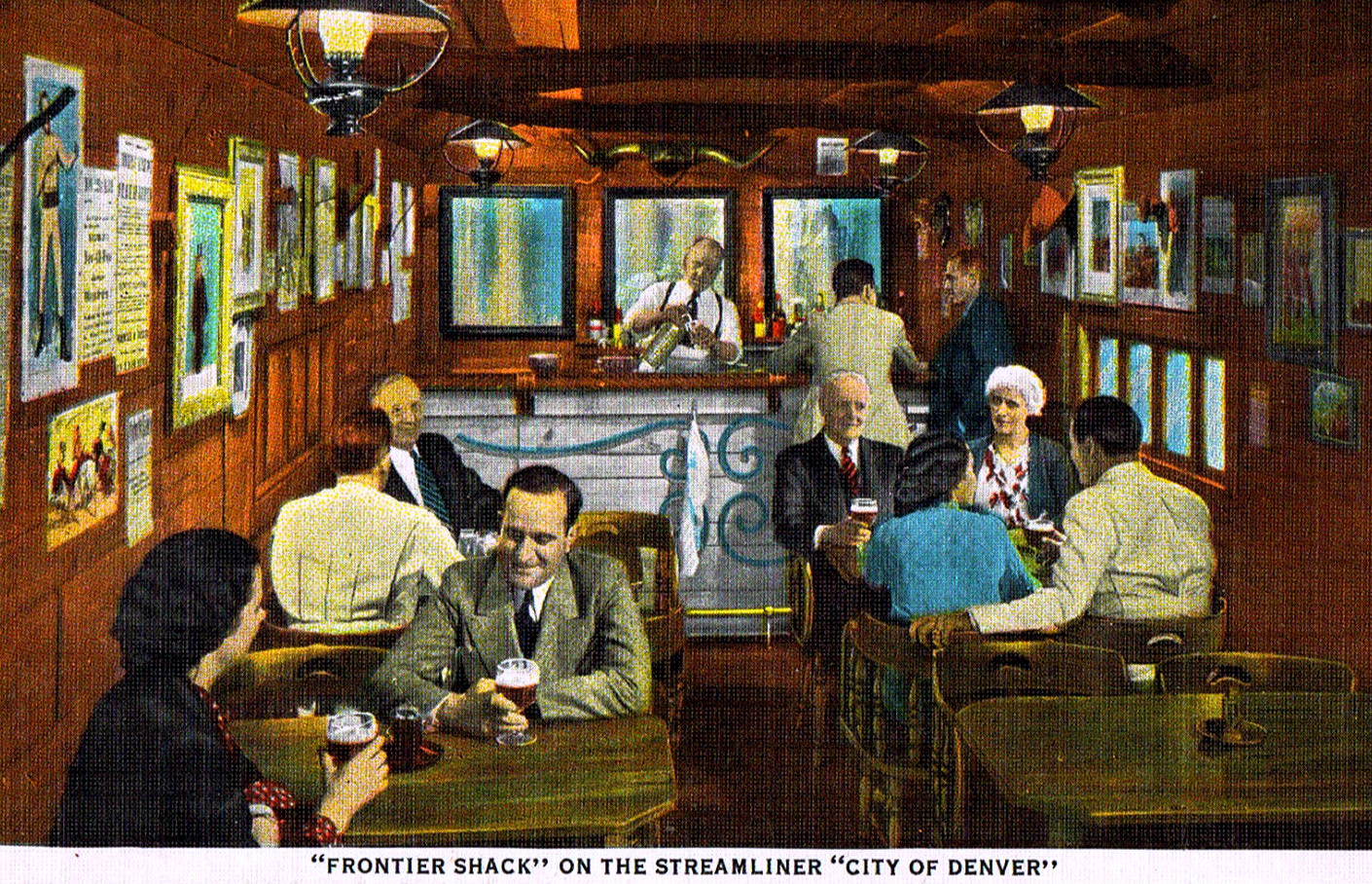
The interior of the "Frontier Shack" baggage-tavern car in the 1940s.

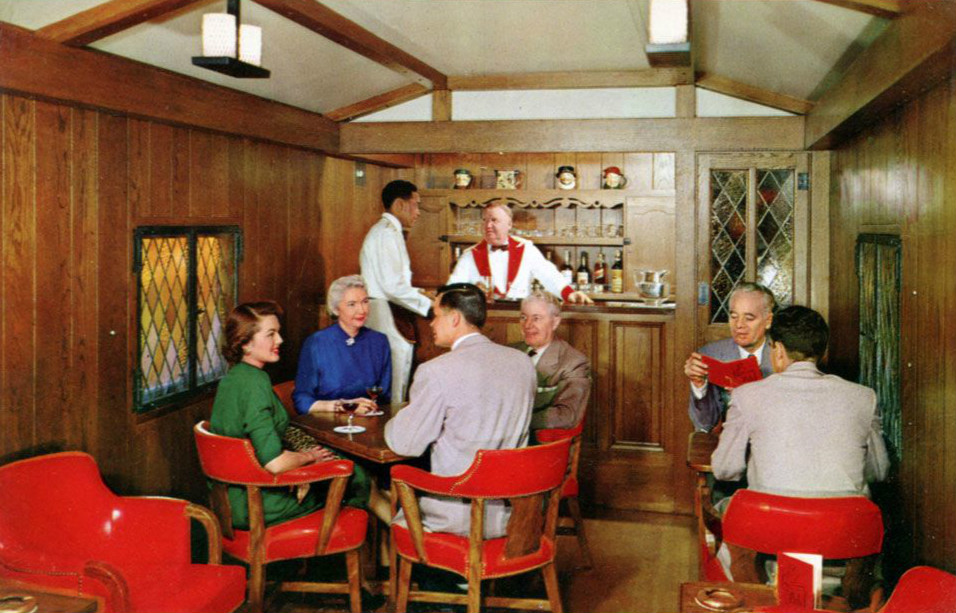
The interior of the "Pub" lounge car in the 1950s.

Pullman-Standard and the Electro-Motive Corporation collaborated on the M-10005 and M-10006 streamlined trainsets which served as the City of Denver's original equipment. They were soon joined by the spare locomotive set M-10003 and the three (two plus backup) were used to provide daily service until they were replaced in 1953. The former M-10004 car set was also used while either of the two primary sets were down for refurbishing. Each set originally contained a two-car power set, with each unit developing 1,200 horsepower (890 kW). The power sets were upgraded with a second booster in mid-1939. Behind the power car was a baggage car with auxiliary power, a baggage-tavern car (containing the famed "Frontier Shack"), two 50-seat coaches, a dining-cocktail lounge, three sleeping cars in varying configurations, and a sleeper-lounge-observation car.

The 50-seat coaches featured 2x2 seating, with baggage racks in the vestibule end and separate men's and women's restrooms in the other. The dining-cocktail lounge had half its space devoted to a kitchen and bar area; two seating areas in the other end seated 12 and 24, respectively. Two of the sleeping cars contained 12 open sections, with daytime seating for 24; the third contained eight enclosed sections, two double bedrooms, and a compartment, giving the car a maximum occupancy of 22. The sleeper-lounge-observation car included a compartment, five more double bedrooms, and a rear observation area which seated 22. The cars were air-conditioned throughout.

The two trainsets remained in use until March 19, 1953, when the Union Pacific introduced conventional lightweight equipment powered by EMD locomotive sets. The Union Pacific finalized the consist on January 10, 1954. Each of the two new consists included the following: a baggage car, a coach-lounge (the "Pub", replacing the "Frontier Shack"), two 44-seat coaches, a twin-unit dining car, four sleeping cars, and a buffet-lounge. The cars were drawn from both the Union Pacific and the Chicago and North Western. The sleeping cars included two 10-roomette 6-double bedroom Pacific-series cars, a 12-section car, and a 4-compartment 4-double bedroom 1-compartment car. For a brief period in the late 1950s two leased Pennsylvania Railroad 21-roomette sleeping cars operated on the City of Denver to compete with the slumbercoaches on the Denver Zephyr. After the discontinuance of the Chicago–Pacific Northwest Olympian Hiawatha in 1961, the Milwaukee Road's Super Dome dome lounges could be found on the City of Denver as well.

== See also ==
- Passenger train service on the Chicago and North Western Railway
- Passenger train service on the Union Pacific Railroad
