= M-10003 to M-10006 =

Streamlined diesel trainset

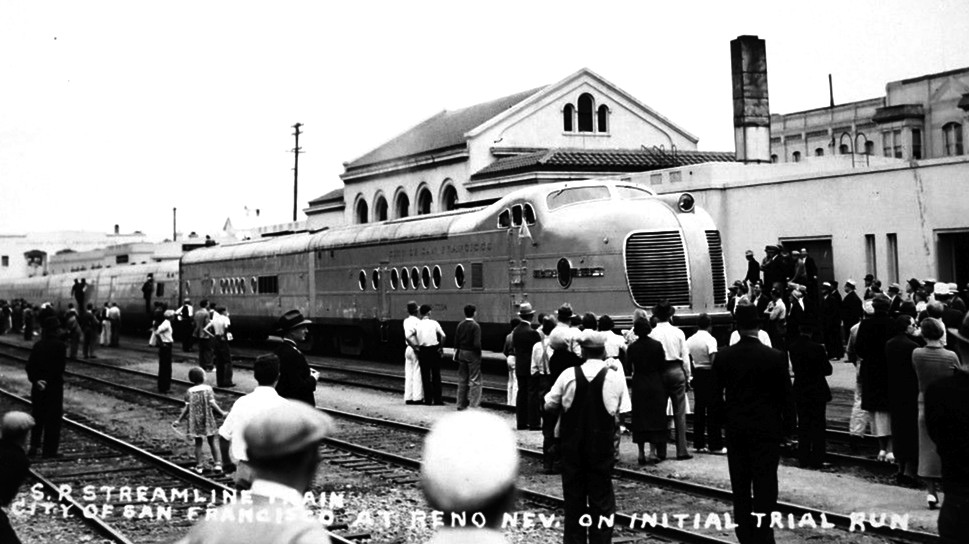
The M-10004 trainset at Reno, Nevada on a trial run. Cars are of the tapered cross-section type used with M-10000 to M-10002.

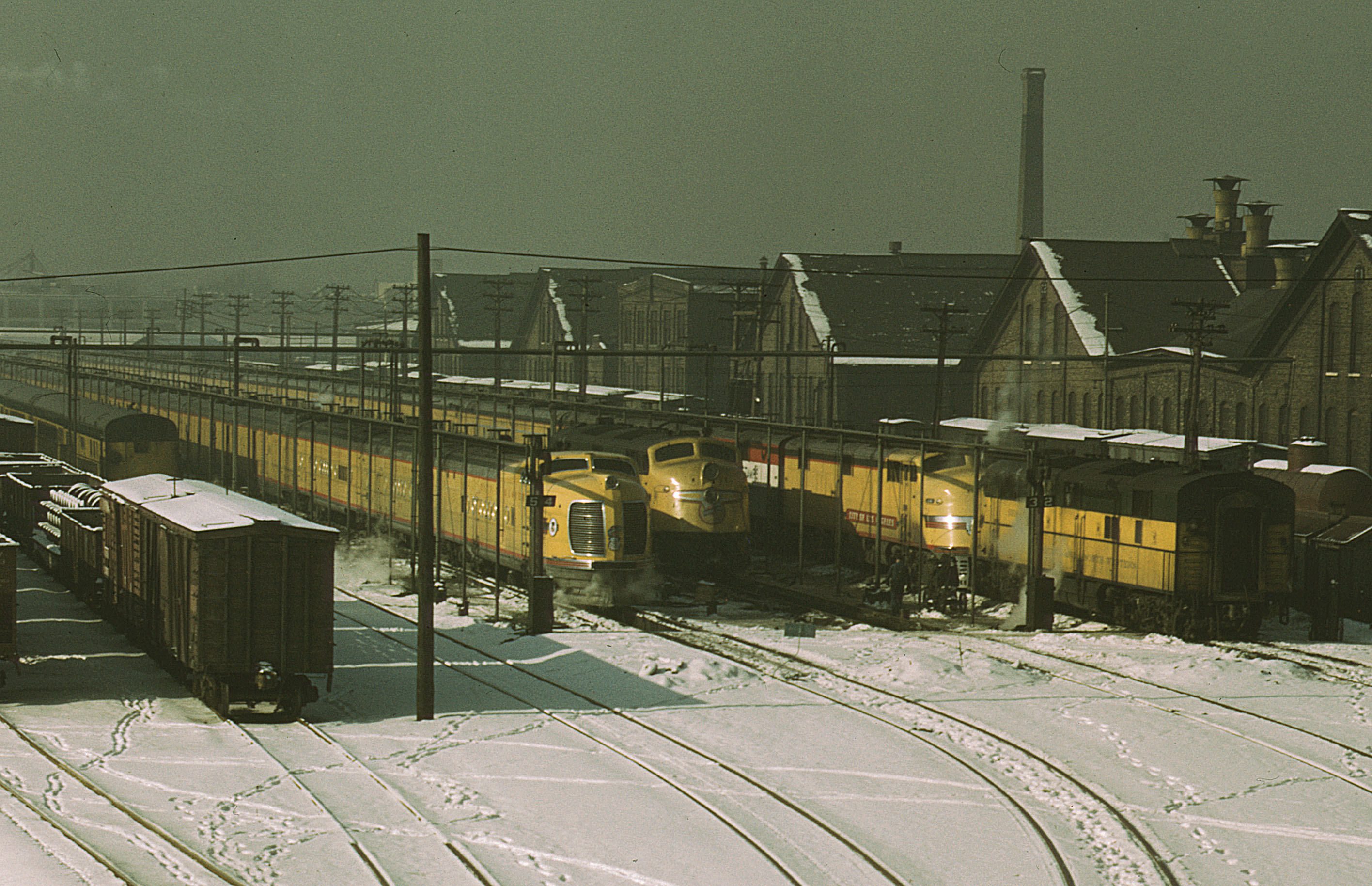
One of the M-10003-6 trains (center left) along with EMD E6 locomotives and other streamlined cars.

The Union Pacific Railroad's M-10003, M-10004, M-10005, and M-10006 were four identical streamlined diesel-electric power car trainsets delivered in May, June, and July 1936 from Pullman-Standard, with prime movers from the Winton Engine Corporation of General Motors and General Electric generators, control equipment and traction motors. One was for the City of San Francisco, two were for the City of Denver, and one was a spare set intended for both routes. In 1939, M-10004 was split and converted into additional boosters for the other sets, now renumbered CD-05, CD-06, and CD-07, all running on the City of Denver. The M-10001 power car became the other third booster. In this form, the three power sets ran until they were replaced by E8 locomotives in 1953, at which point they were all withdrawn from service and scrapped.

== Historical significance ==
The M-10003 through M-10006 represented the final development of the custom streamlined trainset on the Union Pacific. They followed the cab/booster unit concept pioneered with the M-10002 trainset. As totally separable and interchangeable cab/booster power sets, they set the path that EMC was to follow with introduction of their E series locomotive sets the following year. Union Pacific was able to maintain daily service on the Chicago-Denver run for seventeen years by dedicating three locomotive sets to that service and re-purposing power units from M-10001 and M-10004 (three total) to provide additional power and keep at least two of the locomotive sets in running condition at any given time.

== Details ==
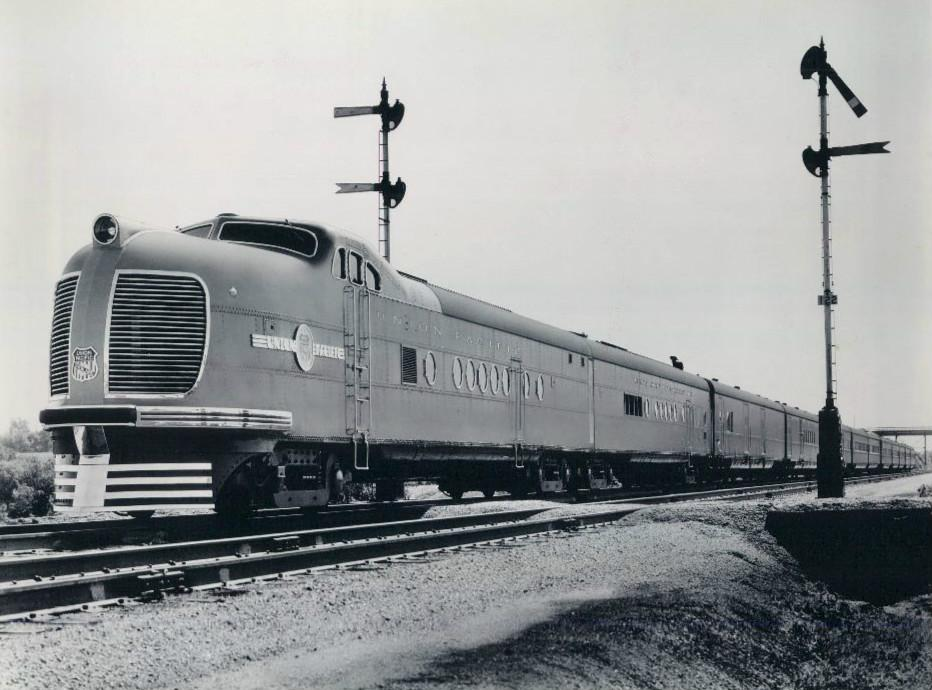
A Union Pacific City of Denver (M-10005 or M-10006), 1940

These power sets had stylistic elements in common with the Illinois Central's Green Diamond trainset, which was completed just previous to them. Abandoning the "turret cab" styling of M-10000 through M-10002, these units adopted a new "automobile design" elevated cab, as with the Green Diamond, behind a longer nose than that of the Diamond. They shared a divided front air intake grille that dominated the nose, edged in shining stainless steel. Beneath, the pilot was edged and barred in stainless steel, very like the Diamond's. The Diamond kept the headlight at the top of the cab, while with these power sets a large headlight tipped the nose. The IC121 Diamond was a single power unit setup with a smaller articulated trainset, and in that regard had more in common with the earlier M-10001.

The copious round porthole-style windows on the power units became a "trademark" feature of Union Pacific locomotives for a number of years. The big shiny noses and portholes were imitated in the styling of UP's E2 locomotives from 1937.

Each power car had a 1,200 hp V16 Winton 201-A engine, generator, and a pair of two-axle powered trucks. The rear truck of the first power car and the lead truck of the second power car carried a span bolster to which both power cars were articulated, so they made one unified locomotive of B-B+B-B configuration and a total of 2,400 hp (1,800 kW).

M-10004 was matched with a trainset of tapered cross-section, low profile articulated cars of the type built for the earlier M-1000x trainsets. The first cars had been built in anticipation of another tapered turret cab locomotive, but Union Pacific decided instead to cancel the proposed turret cab, expand the set to nine cars, and match it with a more powerful locomotive set of the newer design. The lounge car of the M-10004 set was also built with a food preparation facility occupying its blind rear, which was revised with a new layout and porthole style rear windows between the train's City of San Francisco and City of Los Angeles service periods. The M-10005 and M-10006 trainsets were built straight-sided to increase interior space, semi-articulated, and shorter by two sleeper cars than the M-10004 set. All of the M-1000x trainsets were lower profile than standard passenger railcars.

== Changes ==
The most significant change to the City of Denver power sets came in 1939, when they were converted from two-car, 2,400 hp sets to three three-car, 3,600 hp (2700 kW) sets using power equipment from M-10001 and M-10004. Other changes included a gyrating signal light installed below the main headlight after the Second World War, the loss of the stainless steel trim on the pilot, the addition of the Chicago and North Western Railway herald to the nose in addition to the Union Pacific one, and changed nose-side badges for the route. The original Armour Yellow and Leaf Brown livery was changed incrementally to the modern livery of Armour Yellow and Harbor Mist Gray roof and base, with red trim striping separating the main colors. That same footage shows two boosters in the power set, indicating service as City of Denver with the expanded M-10003 (CD-07) power set, and an eleven car consist, expanded from the original nine car consist with cars from either the M-10001 or M-10002 set. Slate gray was replaced with Harbor Mist Gray at some point after the mid-1940s. A publicity photo of M-10005 from 1949 shows the trainset with a Harbor Mist Gray roof and a single headlight.

== Individual power set histories ==
The demands of long-distance high speed City train service taxed the ability of the M-1000x fleet to meet them. The original 2400 hp power sets with Winton 201A Diesel engines were underpowered for their service requirements and had a short lifespan for mechanical parts, with at best 100,000 miles between piston replacements. These shortcomings led to various measures including equipment replacements, 50% redundancy in locomotives assigned to the Denver run, consolidating the motive power of locomotive sets for a 50% boost in power for the remaining sets, and using a locomotive set built for full-size trains instead of the type originally matched with the trainset.

=== M-10003, later CD-07 ===
Despite the earlier number, the M-10003 was actually the last completed of the four. This was because the number M-10003 had been previously assigned to a projected sister trainset to M-10001, which was cancelled when Union Pacific sought a longer trainset with more power in order to meet demand. The number was reassigned to the fourth of the new locomotive sets.

The M-10003 was intended to be a spare power set, able to fill in on either the City of San Francisco or City of Denver if any of the other three locomotives needed maintenance. As of March 7, 1937, its booster unit was on loan to M-10002 on the Los Angeles run. In June 1937, it was decided to permanently assign it to the City of Denver and it was renumbered to CD-07. A third power car was added in 1939, the converted M-10001 power unit.

CD-07 remained in service on the City of Denver with the two other sets until March 1953, and was scrapped with them in summer that year.

=== M-10004, later LA-4 ===
First completed was M-10004 in May 1936 for the City of San Francisco. The new power cars had vertical sides and higher profiles than the previous streamliners, but the rest of the train was built to the tapered-side profile of the M-10000 through M-10002 sets. It entered revenue service on June 14, 1936 but lasted only 18 months on the route before a train equipped with the new EMC E2 3-unit set SF-1, SF-2 and SF-3 took over that route. The train was then refurbished by the UP, renumbered LA-4 and placed on City of Los Angeles service in July 1938, paired with a train powered by the 3-unit E2 set of LA-1, LA-2, and LA-3 to double the service frequency on that route.

After less than a year as the City of Los Angeles, the LA-4 was replaced again, this time by a train equipped with the new EMC E3s LA-5 and LA-6 in March 1939. In June of that year, the lead power car of the train was rebuilt as a booster unit, renumbered to CD-06-C, and added to the former M-10006, now renumbered as CD-06. The trailing power car was added to the former M-10005, now CD-05, as CD-05-C. Both cars were scrapped with their respective power sets in 1953.

The car set from M-10004 became backup equipment in the City fleet, pressed into service after the wreck of the City of San Francisco in August 1939. The set was assigned to the City of Portland run, powered by the former LA-5 and LA-6 E3 locomotive set, between July 1941 and February 1947. The cars were assigned to service as a City of Denver set while the primary sets were renovated in late 1947, then stored in 1948 and scrapped in 1951.

=== M-10005, later CD-05 ===
Completed in June 1936, M-10005 entered service as the first of two new streamliners, the "Denver twins", for the City of Denver service on June 18. After approximately a year of running that service, during which the train and its sister M-10006 had moved 129,000 passengers and travelled 765,000 miles (1,231,000 km) between the two, the train was renumbered CD-05.

In 1939, the former trailing power car of LA-4 (ex M-10004) was added as a third locomotive unit to the power set, giving it a total of 3,600 hp (2,700 kW), and the consist was lengthened by two cars, to nine.

In this form, CD-05 continued in service until March 1953, when it was replaced by new E8 units and scrapped a few months later.

=== M-10006, later CD-06 ===
M-10006 followed a similar service life to its sister M-10005, being the second of the "Denver twins". It was renumbered to CD-06 in June 1937, and added the rebuilt first power car of LA-4 (ex M-10004) as its third power car in 1939. It was withdrawn alongside the other units during March 1953 and scrapped.
