= M-10000 =

Streamlined gasoline-electric trainset

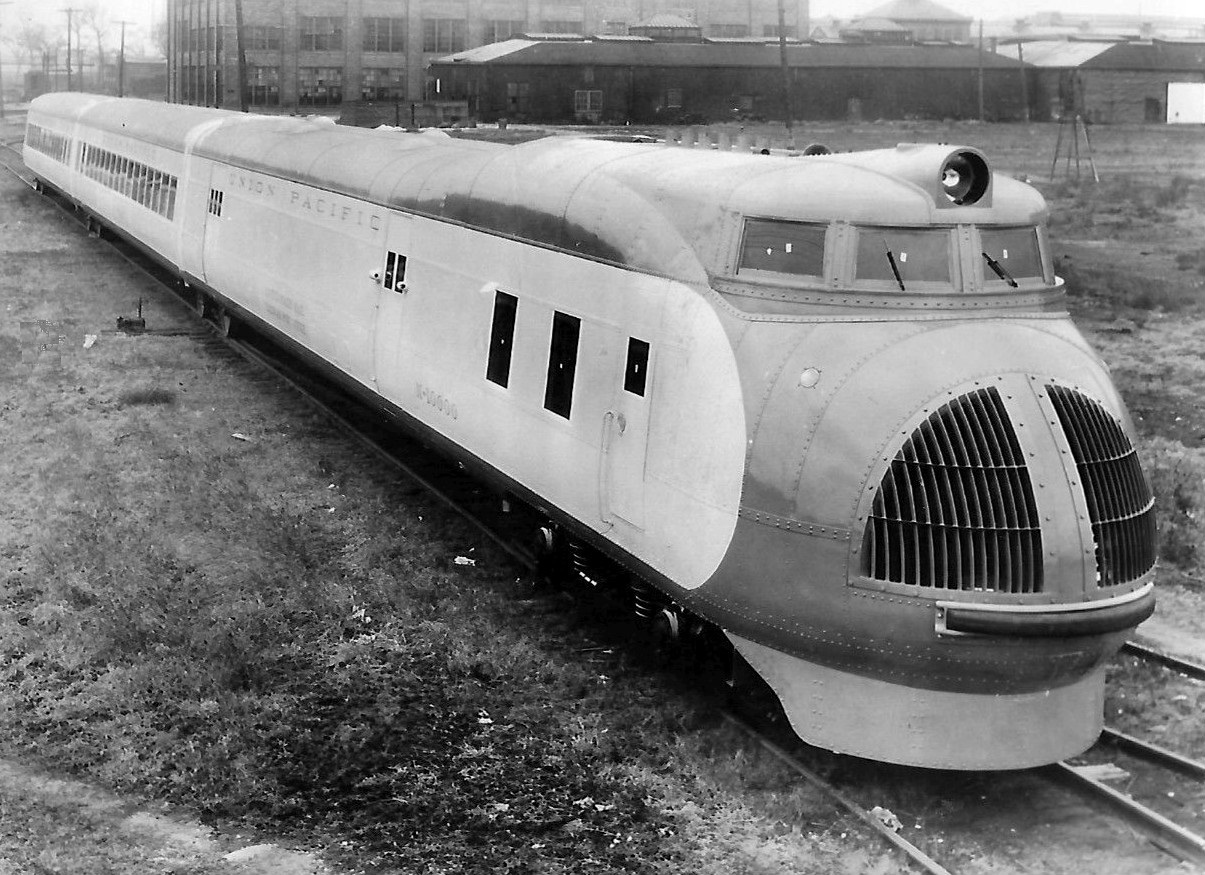
- M-10000

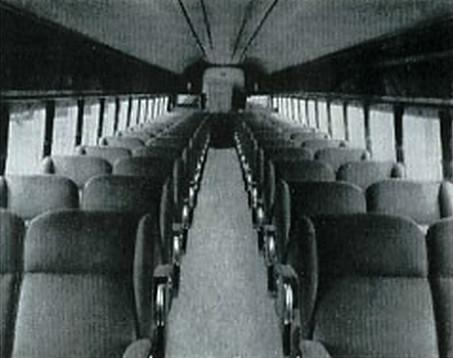
- Stock type: Gasoline-electric passenger one-directional trainset
- Designer: Electro-Motive Corporation
- Constructed: 1934
- Entered service: 1934–1941
- Scrapped: 1942
- Number built: 1 trainset (3 cars)
- Number scrapped: 1 trainset
- Successor: M-10001
- Formation: 1 power cab car (with mail and baggage rooms), 1 trailer car (passenger), 1 trailer tail car (passenger)
- Capacity: 108 (middle car 56 seat coach, end car 52 seat buffet-coach
- Operator: Union Pacific Railroad

Specifications
- Car body construction: aluminum
- Train length: 204 feet 5 inches (62,310 mm)
- Car length: 71 feet 9 inches (21,870 mm) (power car); 58 feet 0 inches (17,680 mm) (intermediate car); 71 feet 0 inches (21,640 mm) (tail car)
- Width: 9 feet 3 inches (2,820 mm)
- Height: 11 feet 11.5 inches (3.645 m)
- Maximum speed: 110 mph (177km/h)
- Weight: 85 tonnes (84 long tons; 94 short tons)
- Traction system: Gasoline–electric
- Prime mover: Winton 191A
- Engine type: Two-stroke gasoline
- Cylinder count: 45° V12
- Cylinder size: 191 cubic inches (3,130 cm^{3})
- Traction motors: 2
- Power output: 600 hp (447 kW)
- Transmission: DC-DC
- AAR wheel arrangement: B-(2+2)-2
- Wheels driven: 2
- Bogies: 1 motor bogie, 2 non-motor Jacobs bogies, 1 non-motor bogie
- Multiple working: no
- Seating: open coach, 2+2
- Track gauge: 1,435 mm (4 ft 8 1/2 in)

The M-10000 was an early American streamlined passenger trainset that operated for the Union Pacific Railroad from 1934 until 1941. M-10000 was the first streamlined passenger train to be delivered in the United States, and the second to enter regular service after the Pioneer Zephyr of the Chicago, Burlington and Quincy Railroad. Rather than having a locomotive and separate detachable cars, the M-10000 featured a front power car with connected passenger cars.

== Development ==
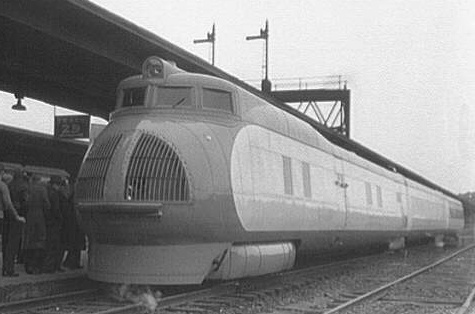
The front view of the M-10000

The M-10000 car design built upon the efforts of William Bushnell Stout, an early designer of all-metal airplanes, who adapted fuselage design ideas to the Railplane (not to be confused with the Bennie Railplane), a lightweight self-propelled railcar built by Pullman-Standard in 1932. The tapered car cross-section, lightweight tubular aluminum space frame construction, and Duralumin skin of the Railplane were carried over into the M-10000 design. The performance of the Railplane in testing drew the attention of Union Pacific, who sought the services of Pullman-Standard in building a small, lightweight streamlined trainset for mainline service. Union Pacific ordered M-10000 from Pullman in May 1933 at a cost of $230,997, following an analysis of passenger traffic that concluded new, more cost effective equipment than heavyweight passenger cars and steam locomotives was required for maintaining profitability, especially on low-traffic routes. The streamlined body was developed from a series of wind tunnel tests that were carried out at the University of Michigan.

The Electro-Motive Corporation (EMC) developed the internal combustion-electric propulsion system powered by a 600 hp spark-ignition engine. As was their practice as a system engineering firm at the time, they contracted manufacture of the components of their systems to primary equipment manufacturers. General Motors' Cleveland subsidiary, the Winton Engine Corporation, provided the prime mover. The air brake compressor, main generator, traction motors and control equipment were manufactured by the General Electric Company. Skepticism that development efforts for diesel engines underway in the early 1930s would provide timely release of an engine adequate for high speed rail service led to use of a spark-ignition distillate engine. Trucks were strongly influenced by German passenger bogie design, as investigated by Union Pacific chief engineer A.H. Fetters.

== Design ==
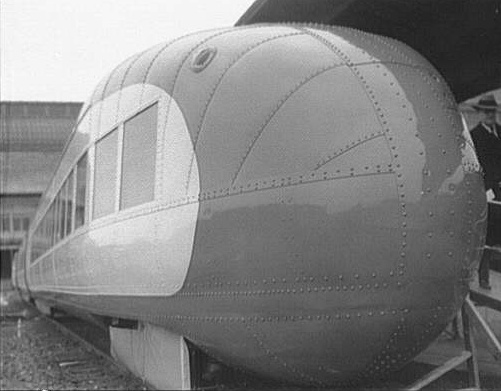
The rear view of the M-10000

The M-10000 was a three-car trainset, with two passenger coaches and a combined power, baggage, and railway post office car. The power car measured 71 feet 9 inches (21.87 m) long, followed by coaches measuring 71 feet (22 m) and 58 feet (18 m). Including the space between cars, the trainset had a total length of 204 feet 5 inches (62.31 m), with a width of 9 feet 3 inches (2.82 m) and a height of 11 feet 11.5 inches (3.645 m) at the cab; the coaches were 1 foot (0.30 m) shorter. The trainset was articulated using shared Jacobs bogies to reduce weight, making the train operate as one integrated unit rather than as a separable locomotive and cars. The integrated-body-and-frame construction using aluminum reduced the required structural weight to a fraction of that for conventional body-on-frame railcars, and the trainset's total weight of 85 tonnes (85,000 kg) was about the same as a single passenger coach of the time.

The power car featured an elevated "turret cab" behind a nose featuring a large vertically-divided air intake grille formed by parabolic arches. On the roof of the cab were a headlamp and a vertical marker light. The train was powered by a single 600 horsepower (450 kW) spark-ignited distillate-burning engine, built by the General Motors subsidiary Winton Engine Corporation, driving a generator that powered two traction motors on the leading truck of the power car. The two passenger coaches each had a capacity of 60 people; the last coach also included a small galley at the rear end to prepare meals that were served at passengers' seats. Original livery consisted of Armour Yellow sides with a Leaf Brown nose, roof, rear, and lower panels, and red striping to separate the two main colors. The nose was subsequently painted Armour Yellow, consistent with other early Union Pacific streamliners.

== Service history ==
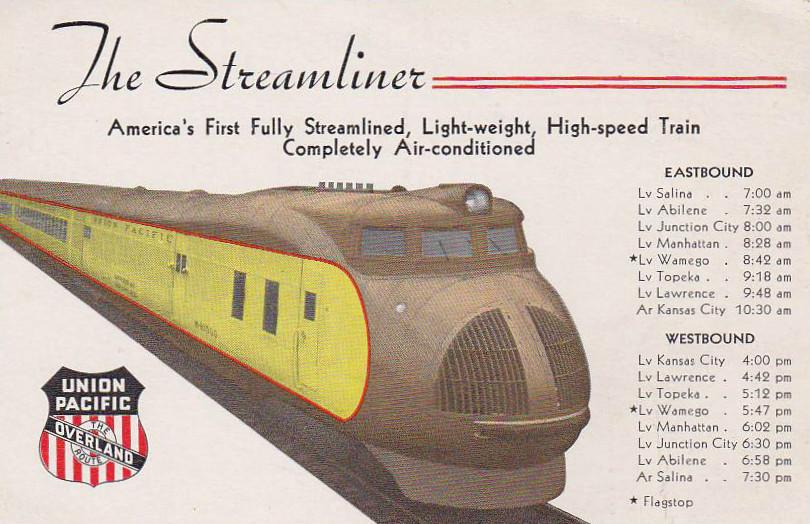
A postcard photo of the M-10000 as the City of Salina

The trainset was delivered on February 12, 1934, and was sent on a publicity tour across the US, during which about a million people toured it and its stops became local media sensations. During its 13,000-mile (21,000 km) exhibition tour across the US as The Streamliner, where it hit a top speed of 110 mph (177 km/h) during its journey, it visited Washington DC for inspection by Franklin Delano Roosevelt. The popular train was put on display at the 1934 World's Fair ("A Century of Progress") in Chicago from May 26 to October 31, 1934. It was somewhat overshadowed by the other lightweight streamliner, the diesel-powered Burlington Zephyr, which entered the fair after a record-setting "Dawn to Dusk Dash" speed run from Denver to Chicago, in time to arrive at the "Wings of a Century" transportation pageant. During its testing, demonstration, and display periods, the M-10000 trainset included the sleeper car Overland Trail, which was removed from the consist prior to revenue service and added to Union Pacific's next streamliner, M-10001.

M-10000 was placed in revenue service between Kansas City, Missouri and Salina, Kansas as The Streamliner on January 31, 1935. It was subsequently named City of Salina as Union Pacific adopted the "City of..." convention for its new streamliners, but was also nicknamed the "Tin Worm" or "Little Zip". It operated until December 1941, by which time its engine, after powering the train for approximately 995,000 miles, required replacement that was deemed prohibitively expensive. The trainset was scrapped the following year, with its aluminum recycled for use in the wartime aircraft industry.

== Legacy ==
Union Pacific commissioned five diesel-powered streamliners during 1934–1936, evolved from the M-10000 design. The color scheme originated with M-10000 was used for UP's later streamliners and changed incrementally to the Armour Yellow and Harbor Mist Gray livery that became UP's standard. The "Streamliner" name for M-10000 became the general term for locomotives and passenger trains styled with clean lines and an aerodynamic look. The high-mounted, behind-the-nose cab design originated with M-10000 was later adopted for EMD's E-unit and F-unit locomotives, although without the front-mounted air intake. Integrated-body-and-frame, or carbody, designs became standard for rail equipment where weight was a concern, such as early mainline diesel locomotives, passenger cars, urban mass transit rail, and high-speed passenger rail.

== In popular culture ==
In the 1937 children's book "Choo Choo: The Story of an Engine Who Ran Away" by Virginia Lee Burton, an M-10000 is cast as the streamliner train that helps Choo Choo's crew pursue the title engine after she runs away. Once Choo Choo is found on an old unused track, her engineer, Jim, uses a chain to help the streamliner tow Choo Choo back to the big city as the M-10000 lacks couplers.
