= M-10001 =

Streamlined diesel trainset

M - 10001
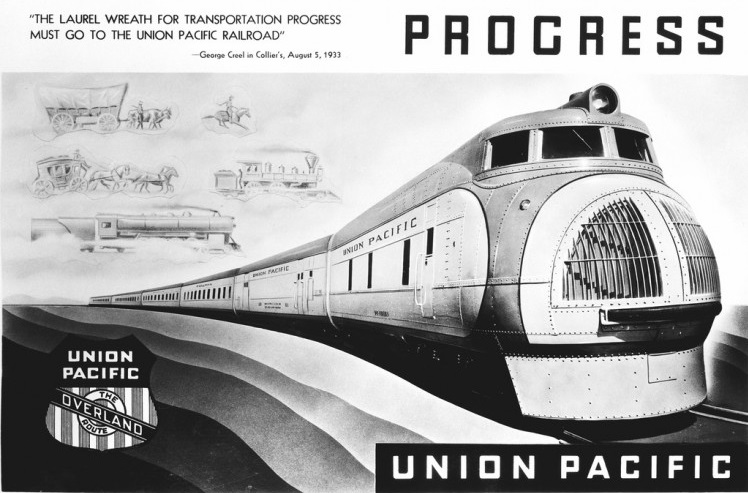
- 1934 advertisement depicting the M-10001.
Type and origin
- Power type: Diesel-electric
- Designer: Electro-Motive Corporation
- Build date: 1934
- Total produced: 1
Specifications
- Configuration
  - AAR: B-(B+2+2+2+2)-2
- Gauge: 1,435 mm (4 ft 8 1/2 in)
- Length
  - Over beams: 48 ft (15 m) (power car)
- Width: 9 feet 3 inches (2,820 mm)
- Height: 11 feet 11.5 inches (3.645 m)
- Prime mover: Winton 201A
- RPM range
  - RPM idle: 275
  - Maximum RPM: 750
- Engine type: Two-stroke diesel
- Aspiration: Blower-scavenged proportional
- Cylinders: 60° V12
- Cylinder size: 502.65 cubic inches (8,237.0 cm^{3})
- Transmission: DC-DC
- MU working: no
Performance figures
- Power output: 900 hp (670 kW)

The Union Pacific Railroad's M-10001 was a diesel-electric streamlined train built in 1934 by Pullman-Standard with a power system developed by General Motors Electro-Motive Corporation using a Winton 201A Diesel engine and General Electric generator, control equipment and traction motors. It was the UP's second streamliner after the M-10000, their first equipped with a diesel engine and was a longer train (six cars) than its three-car predecessor. All cars were articulated—trucks were shared between each car. It was delivered on October 2, 1934, and was used for display, test and record-setting runs for the next two months before being returned to Pullman-Standard for an increase in power and capacity, following which it was placed into service as the City of Portland train. It has been nicknamed "The Banana".

== Record-setting run ==
In October 1934 the M-10001, known as the "Canary Bolt" and still with its original 900 hp (670 kW) engine, set an as-yet unbroken record of 57 hours from coast to coast of the United States, leaving Los Angeles at 10 PM on the 22nd and arriving Grand Central Terminal at 9:55 AM on the 25th. When placed in service as the City of Portland the train reduced the Chicago, Illinois to Portland, Oregon schedule from 58 hours to 40 hours without any upgrades to track or other facilities.

== Technical details ==
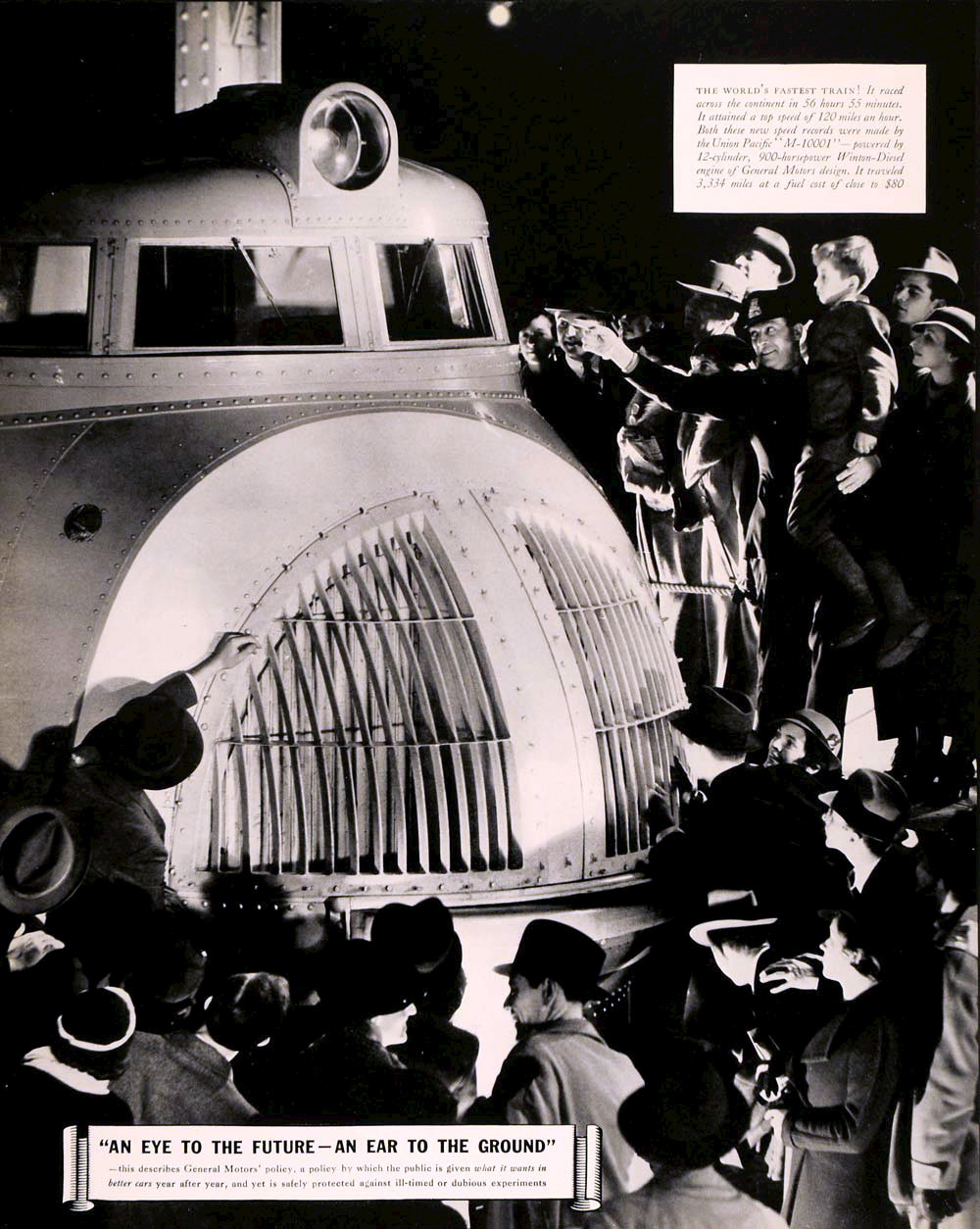
After the record run in October 1934 the M-10001 gave its manufacturers and the Union Pacific much publicity.

When built, the M-10001 was a fully articulated six-car train, 376 ft (115 m) in length, comprising a 48 ft (15 m) power car, a Railway Post Office/baggage car, three Pullman sleeping cars, and a rounded-tail coach/buffet/observation car. It was powered by a 900 hp (670 kW) V12 version of the Winton 201-A engine, driving the first two trucks of the train. Pre-service testing revealed that the original engine was overtaxed, and that the truck design resulted in unstable oscillations at high speeds; in December 1934 the trainset was returned to Pullman to get a larger engine and lengthened trucks. Martin P. Blomberg carried that experience with truck design to the Electro-Motive Corporation, reflected in the design of their E series locomotives.

The rebuilding lengthened the train to 455 feet (139 m) and seven cars. The power car had 12 ft (3.7 m) added to accommodate a 1,200 hp (890 kW) V16 Winton diesel engine. The RPO/baggage car was lengthened by eight feet (2.4 m) to take a steam generator for train heating, and was followed by an added diner/lounge car.

The 1,200 hp (890 kW) Winton Diesel engine was the most powerful Diesel engine used in a passenger train until the postwar era. It was installed in Union Pacific's locomotive units built during 1935–36, after which twin engine designs became preferred.

== Service life ==
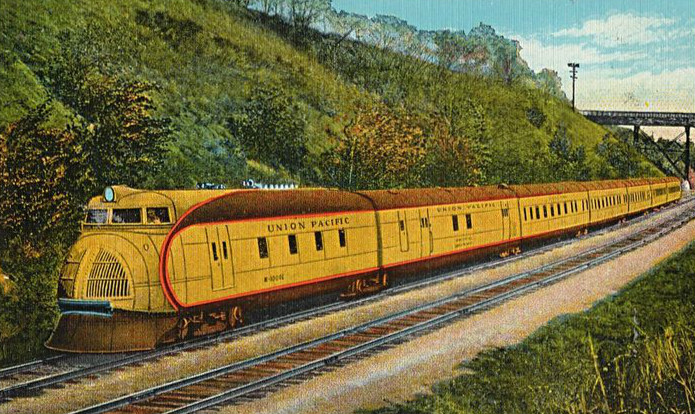
A 1939 colorized postcard depicting the Union Pacific's streamlined M-10001 City of Portland

The rebuilt train was re-delivered on May 23, 1935, and after some test runs was dedicated as the first City of Portland on June 5 at the Portland Rose Festival, entering service between Portland and Chicago the following day. It remained in that service until 1938 when it was replaced by the M-10002 trainset, reassigned from the City of Los Angeles. After serving on the Portland-Seattle run it was retired in June 1939; the City of Denver trains needed more power and Union Pacific cannibalized M-10001 and M-10004. By December the diesel engine, generator, trucks, and the steam generator from the RPO/baggage car were removed and installed in a new carbody to become the third power unit on the CD-07 set for the City of Denver. Two sleeping cars were refurbished and added to the former M-10004 car set, which served as a spare City of Denver set, then in 1941 was assigned to service as City of Portland, powered by an EMC E3 locomotive set. The remainder of the train was stored until August 13, 1941, when it was sold for scrap.
