= City of Portland (train) =

Named passenger train in the U.S.

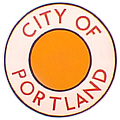
- "Drumhead" logos adorned the ends of the observation cars on the City of Portland.

Overview
- Service type: Inter-city rail
- Status: Discontinued
- Locale: Northwestern United States; Midwestern United States
- First service: June, 1935
- Last service: April, 1971
- Successor: Pioneer
- Former operators: 1935-1955: Union Pacific Railroad and Chicago and North Western Railway; 1955-1971: Union Pacific and Milwaukee Road

Route
- Termini: Chicago, Illinois; Portland, Oregon; alternate section to Seattle, Washington
- Distance travelled: 2,263 miles (3,642 km) (1954)
- Train numbers: 105 (westbound); 106 (eastbound)

On-board services
- Seating arrangements: Leg rest coaches
- Sleeping arrangements: Open sections, roomettes, double bedrooms, drawing rooms and compartments (1954)
- Catering facilities: Dining car
- Observation facilities: Club lounge car

Technical
- Track gauge: 1,435 mm (4 ft 8 1/2 in)

The City of Portland was a named passenger train on the Union Pacific Railroad between Chicago, Illinois, and Portland, Oregon. The first trip left Portland on June 6, 1935, using the streamlined M-10001 trainset. With only one set of equipment, the train left each terminal six times a month. A broken axle derailed the trip that left Chicago on July 23, 1935, and the repaired train resumed service with the trip leaving Portland on February 6, 1936. In May 1936 it started running five times a month instead of six, allowing more time in Chicago between trips. (In July 1935 it was scheduled to arrive Chicago at 9:30 AM and leave at 6:15 PM the same day.)

It was the first streamliner with sleeping cars and the first streamliner running from Chicago to the Pacific coast; its 39-hour-45-minute schedule became the standard. (In April 1935 the fastest train took 59 hr 20 min Chicago to Portland.) The M-10001 was withdrawn in March 1938 and replaced with another articulated trainset, the former City of Los Angeles M-10002. In July 1941 M-10002 was replaced with a train powered by the EMC E3 set inherited from City of Los Angeles pulling the former M-10004 cars, with some former M-10001 cars added. Service was expanded following the war as the train was joined, then replaced, by full-size trains powered by E6 and E7 locomotives. The train was the first of the 40-hour Coast streamliners to run daily, in February 1947. Starting in October 1955 the Milwaukee Road was used instead of the Chicago and North Western between Chicago and Omaha; from January 1959 until 1967 the train ran via Denver. The train was discontinued May 1, 1971, with the takeover of Union Pacific's passenger services by Amtrak. The route roughly follows the trail of the defunct Amtrak route, the Pioneer, except that the latter diverted to Ogden, Utah, while the City of Portland did not enter Utah.

In addition to baggage, coach, and sleeping cars, about 1955 the City of Portland added an Astra Dome dome coach, dome observation lounge and dome dining car to each consist. The dome dining cars were unique to Union Pacific and were only operated on this train and the City of Los Angeles.

== Major cities served ==
Prior to 1955:

- Chicago, Union Station
- Cedar Rapids, Union Station
- Omaha, Union Station
- Boise, Union Pacific Depot
- Portland, Union Station

Following 1955 rerouting via Milwaukee Road:

- Chicago, Union Station
- Marion station (Cedar Rapids via bus connection)
- Omaha, Union Station
- Boise, Union Pacific Depot
- Portland, Union Station

Following 1959 rerouting:

- Chicago, Union Station
- Marion station (Cedar Rapids via bus connection)
- Omaha, Union Station
- Denver, Union Station
- Boise, Union Pacific Depot
- Portland, Union Station
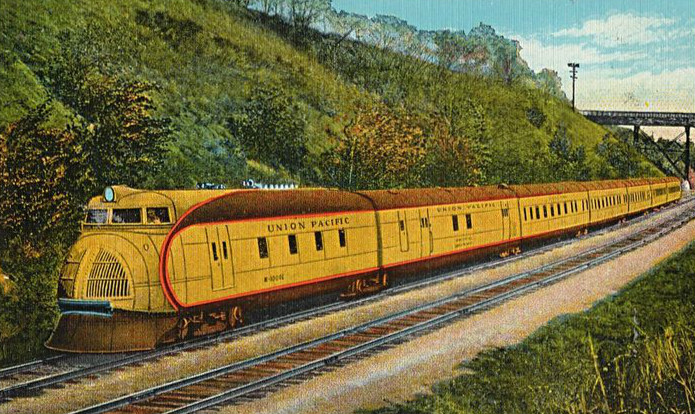
1939 postcard showing 1935-37 trainset.

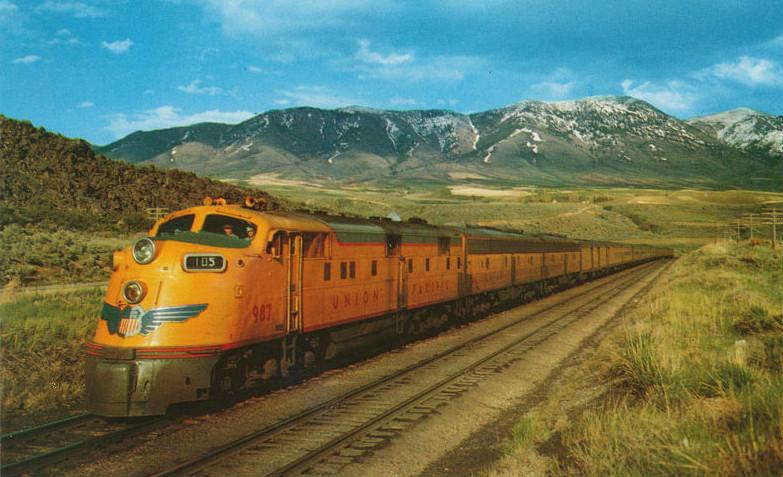
The train headed by an EMD E6A locomotive

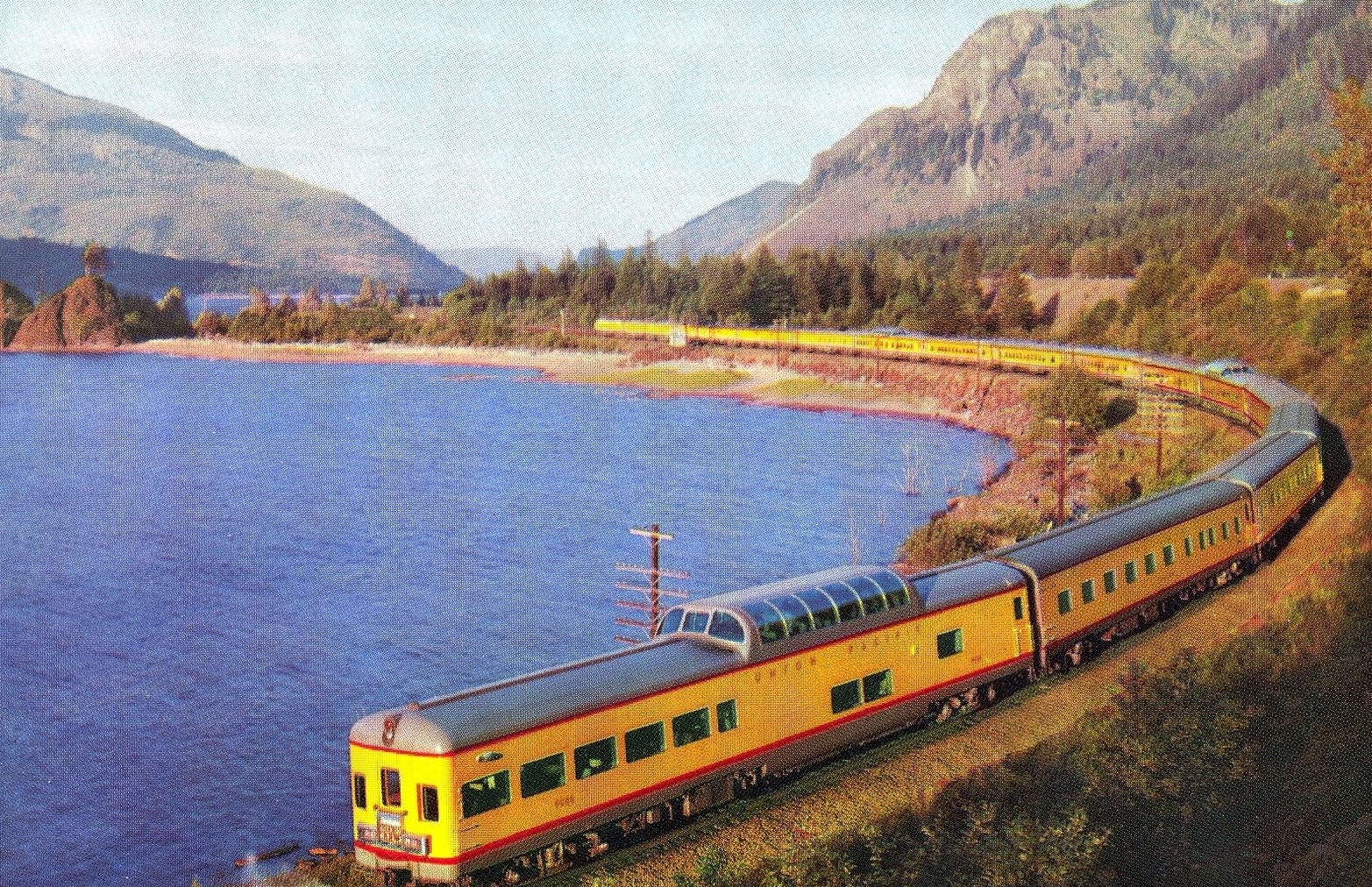
The train along the Columbia circa 1955
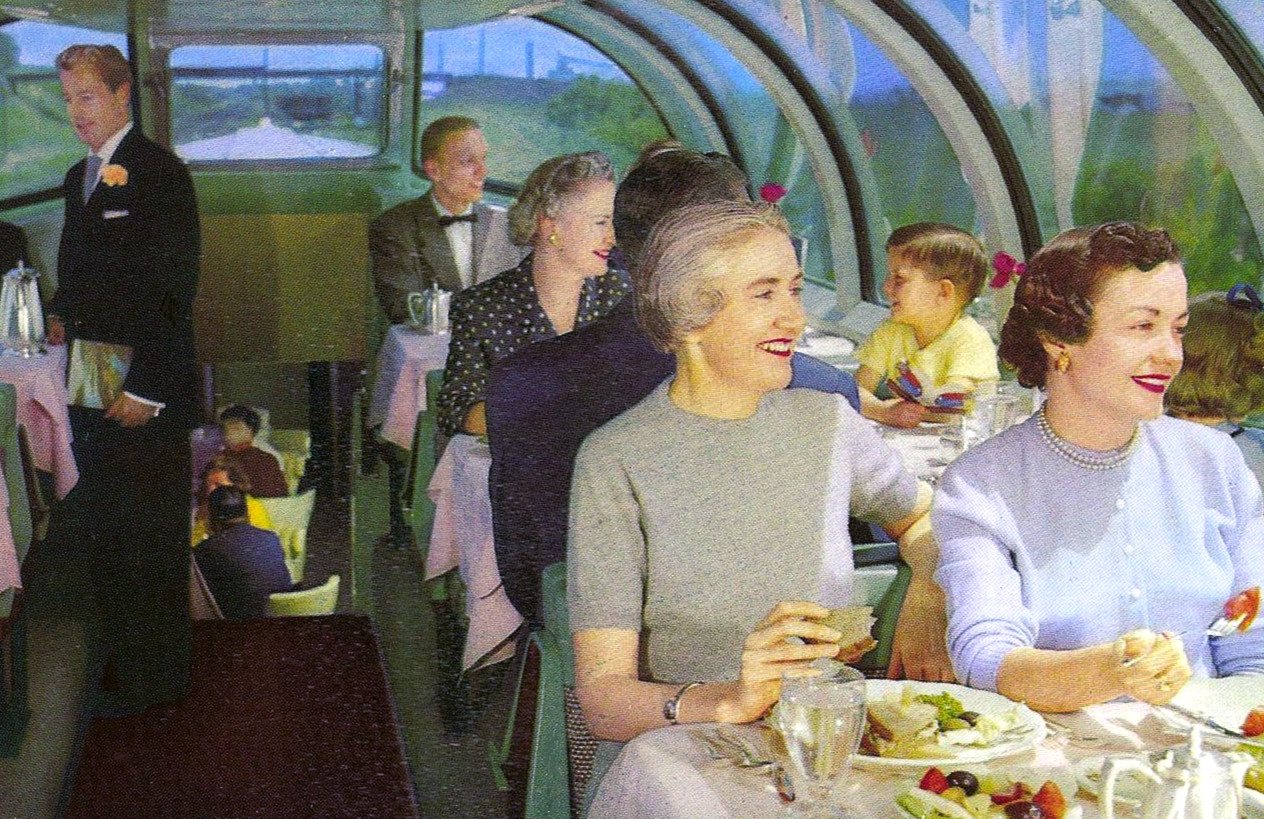
Dome dining car upper level

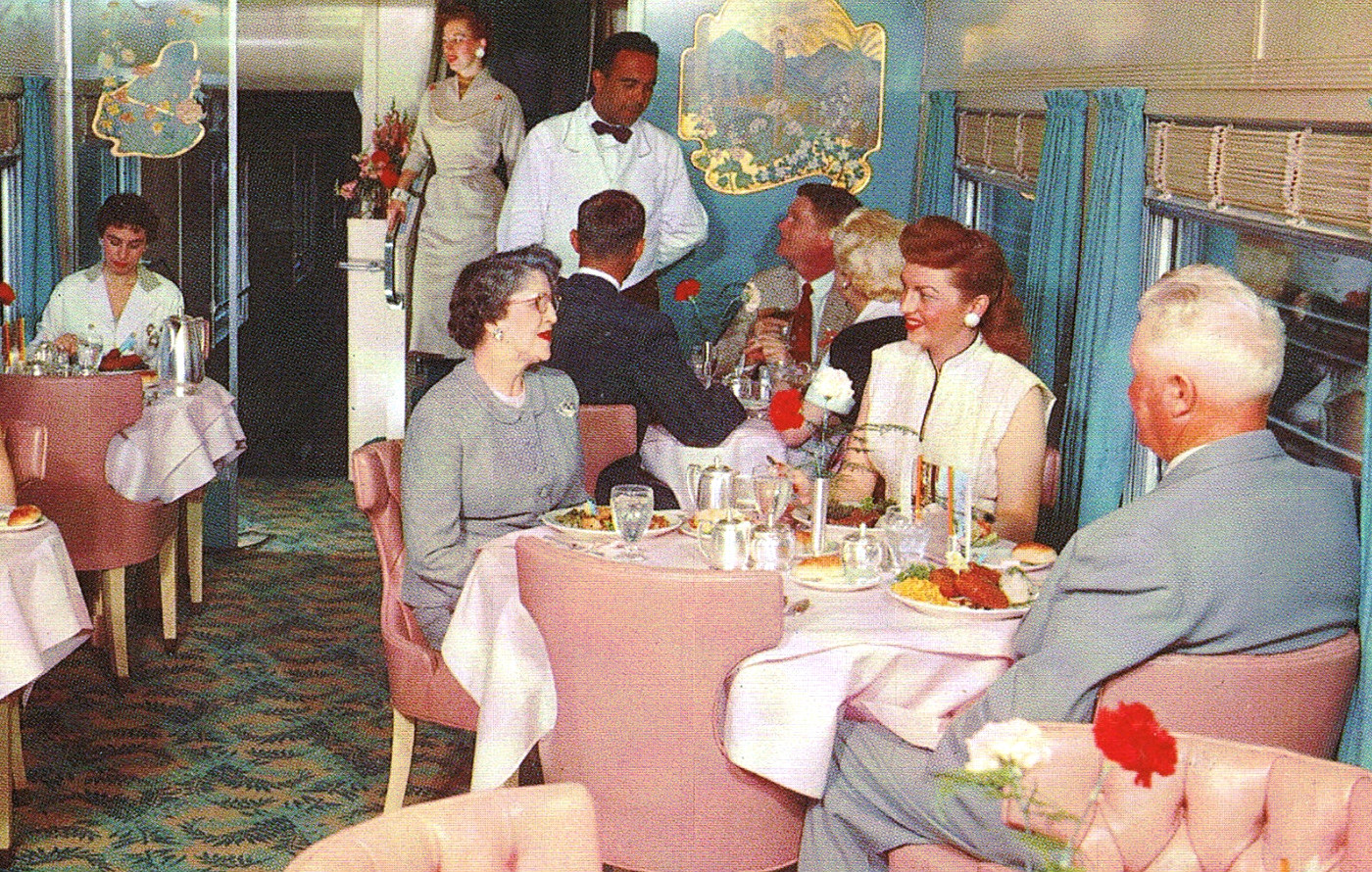
Dome diner lower level

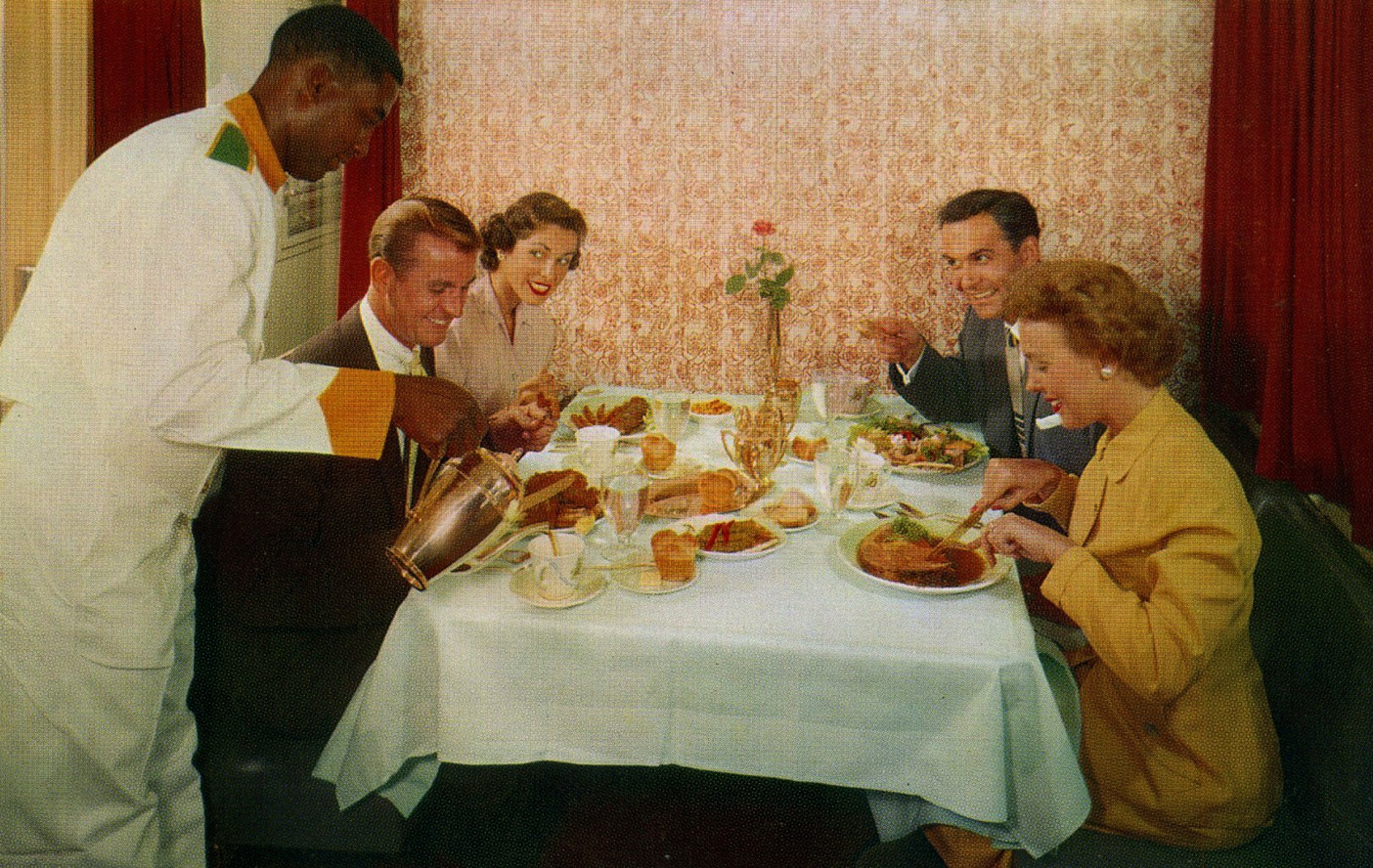
The Gold Room-a private dining room available by reservation

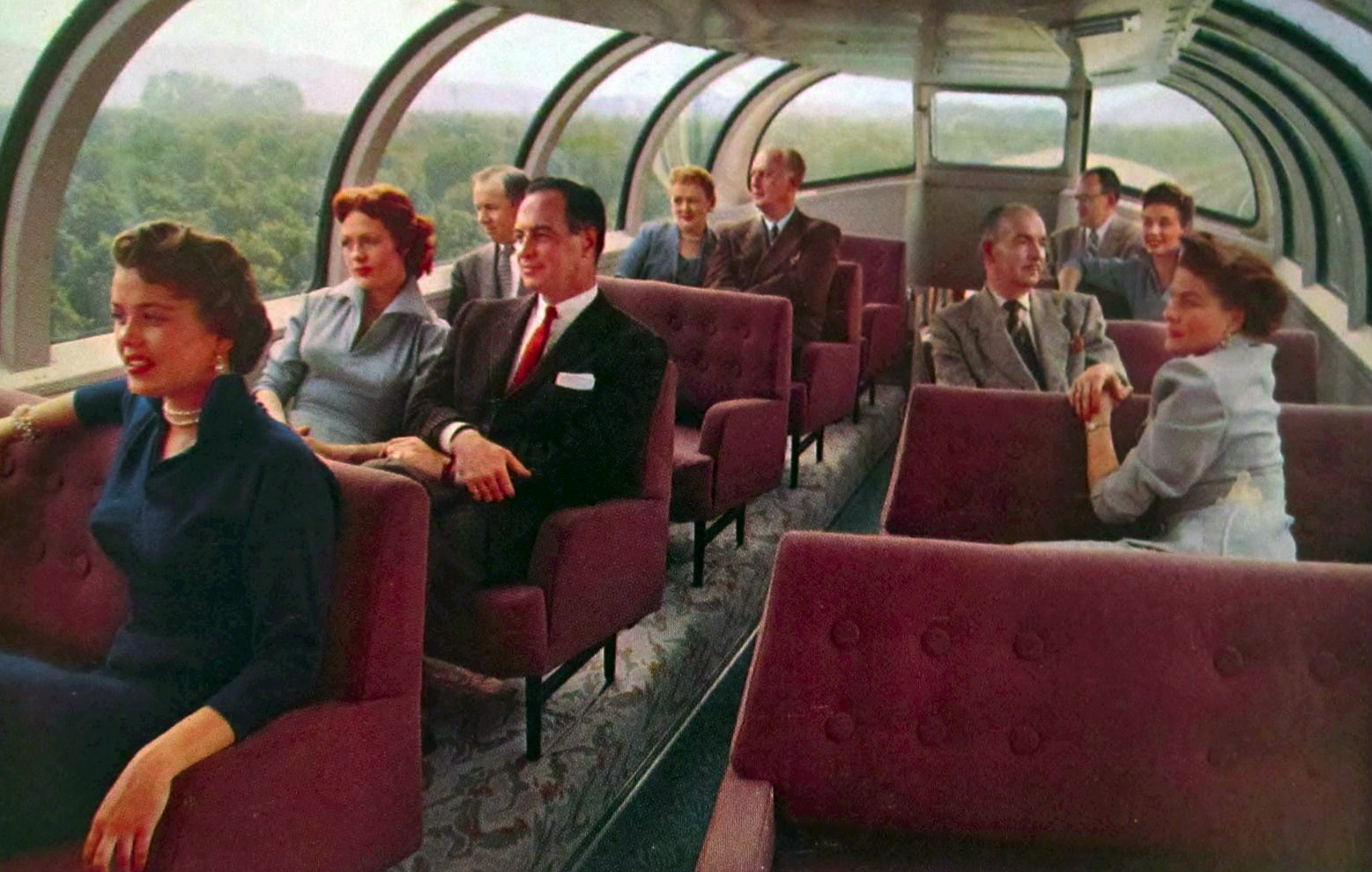
Dome observation car upper level

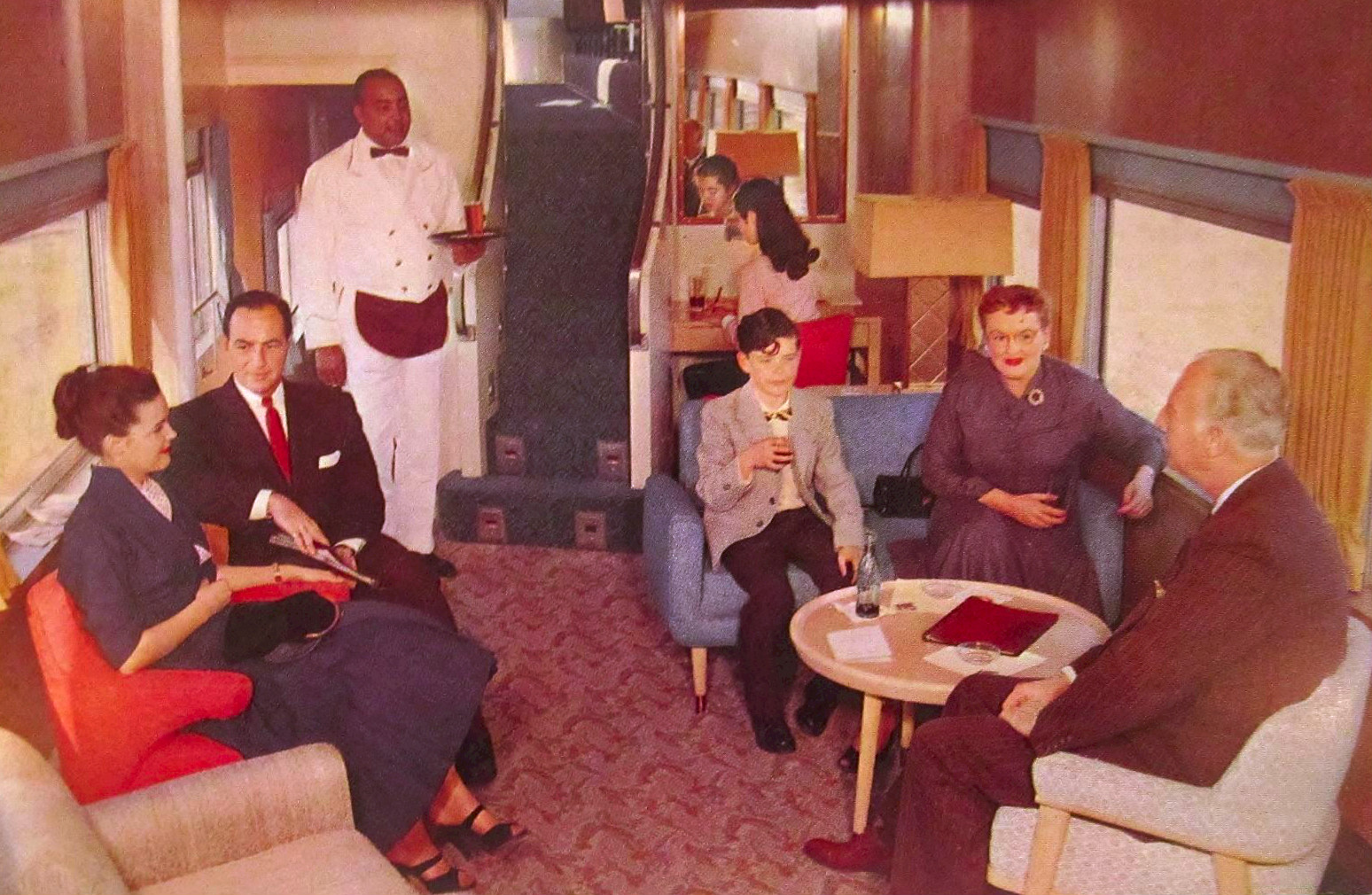
Dome observation car lower level

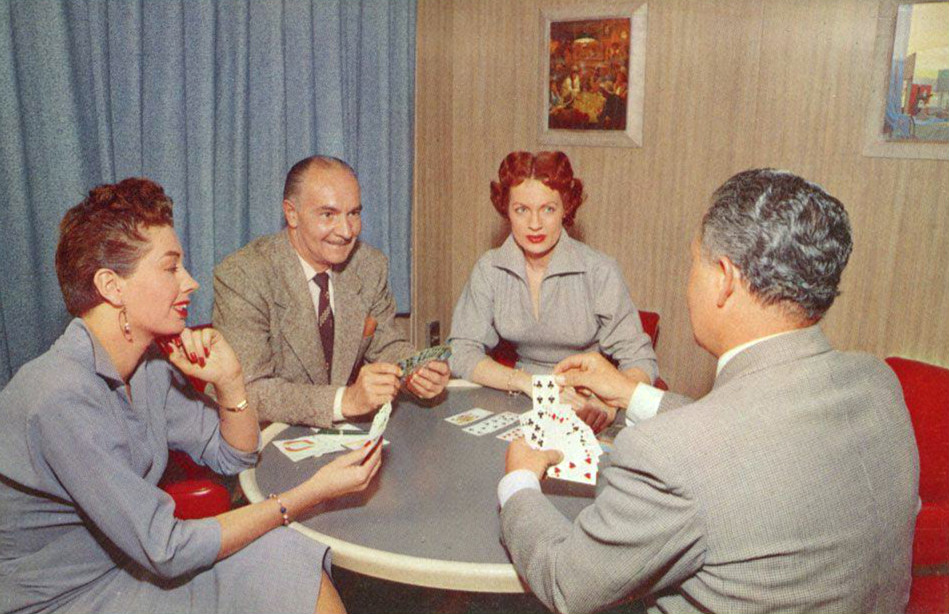
Observation car room for playing cards

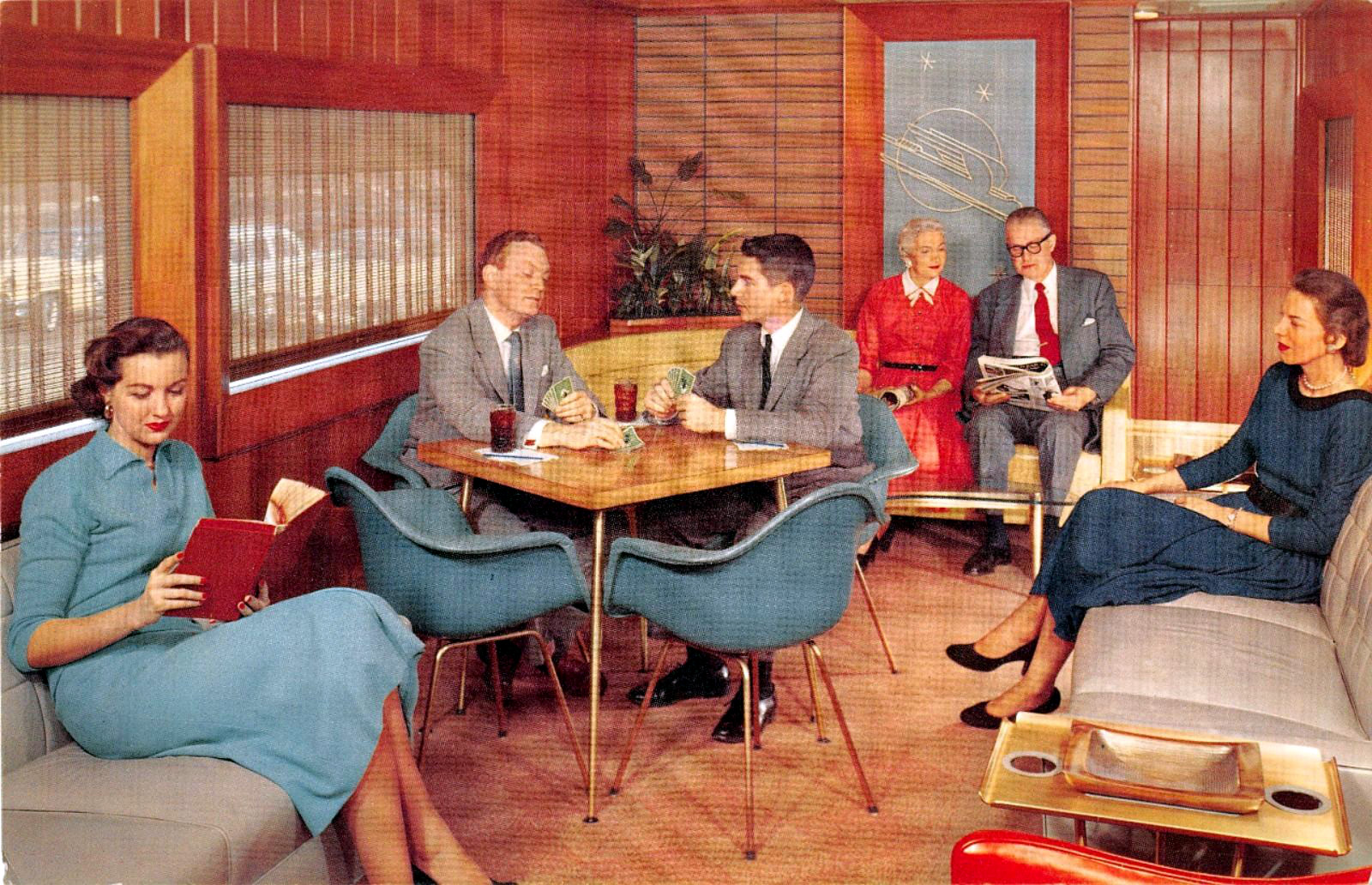
The Redwood Lounge car carried on the City of Portland and the City of Los Angeles

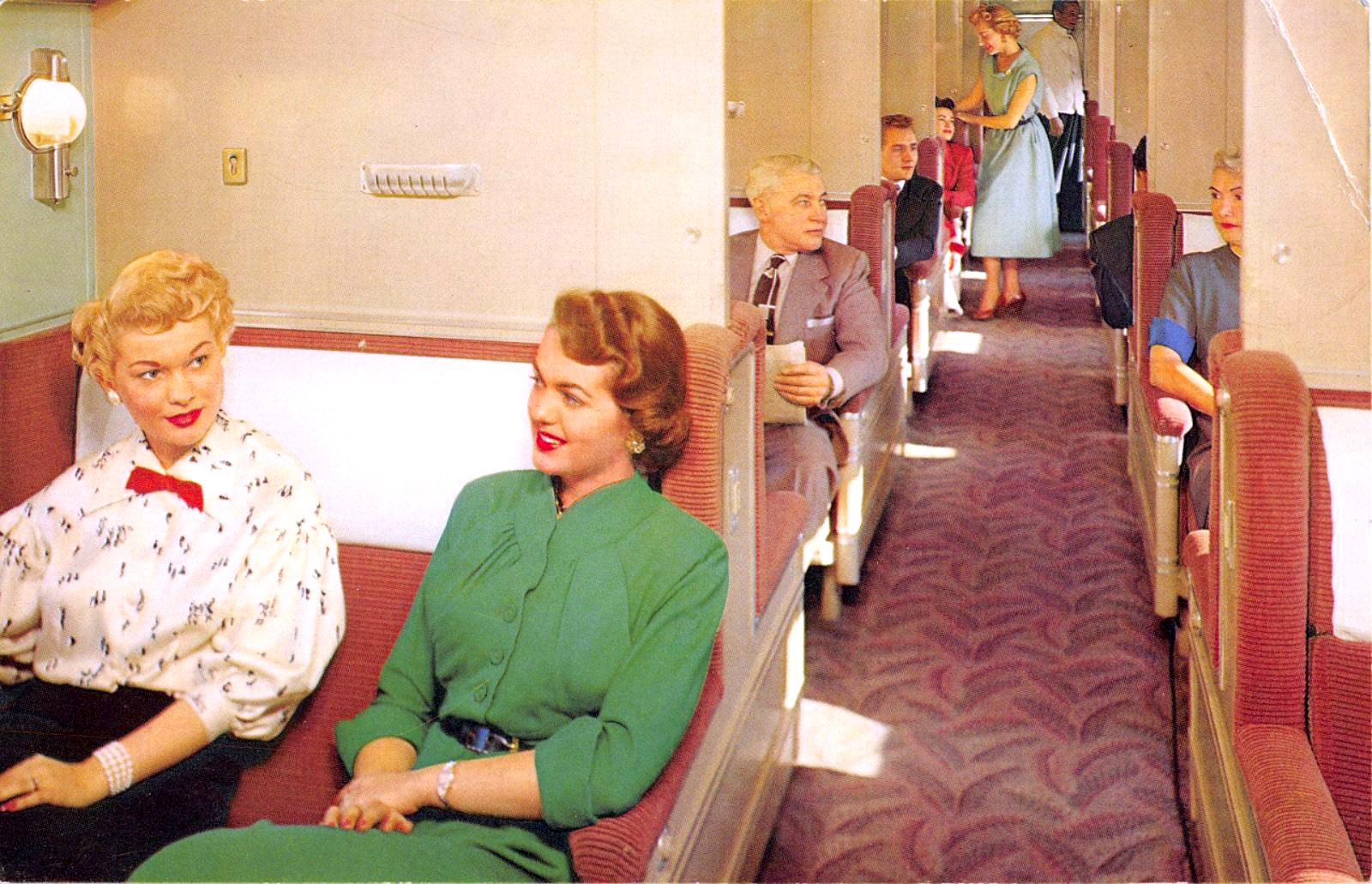
Pullman car in day mode

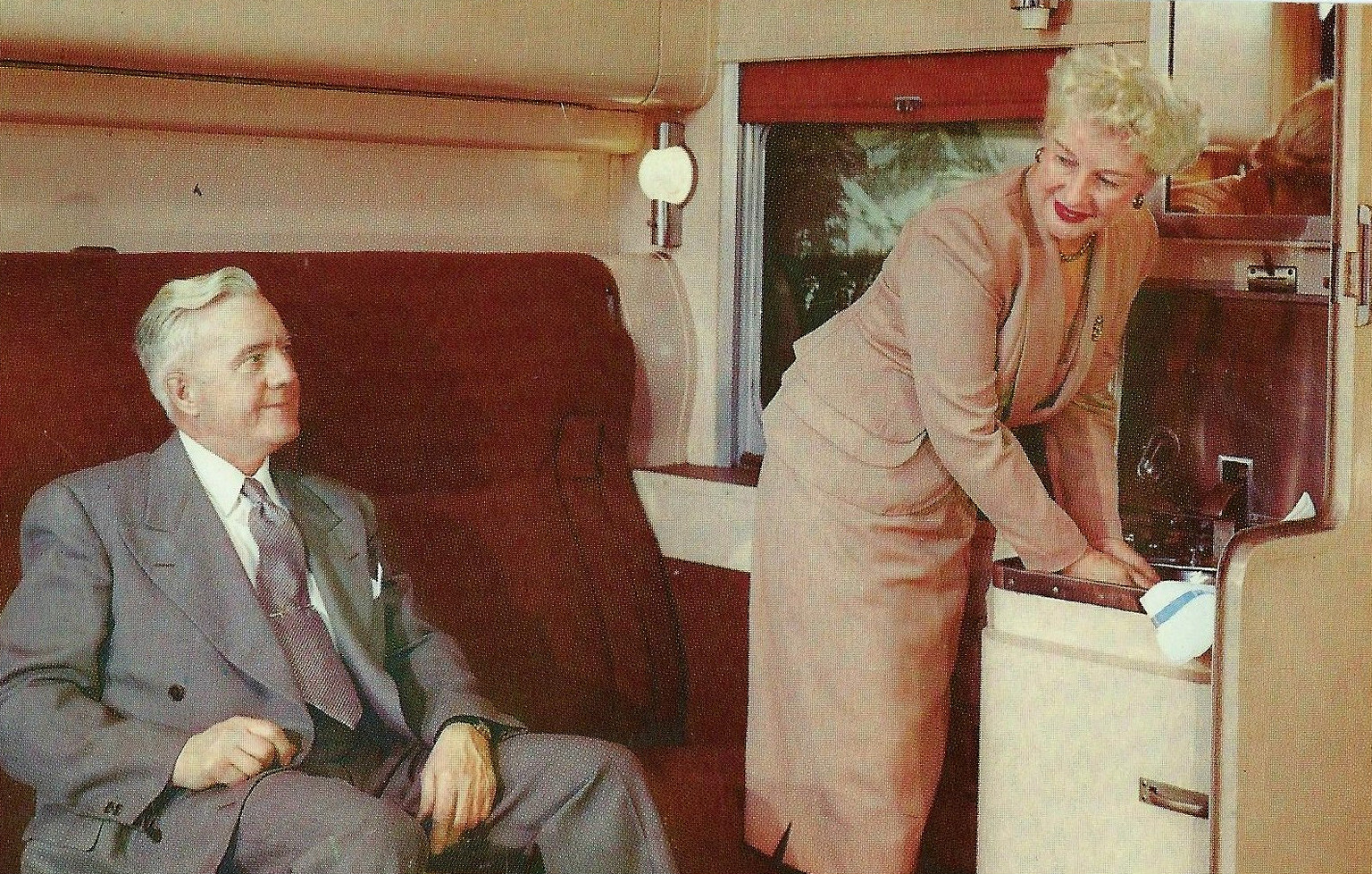
Pullman compartment

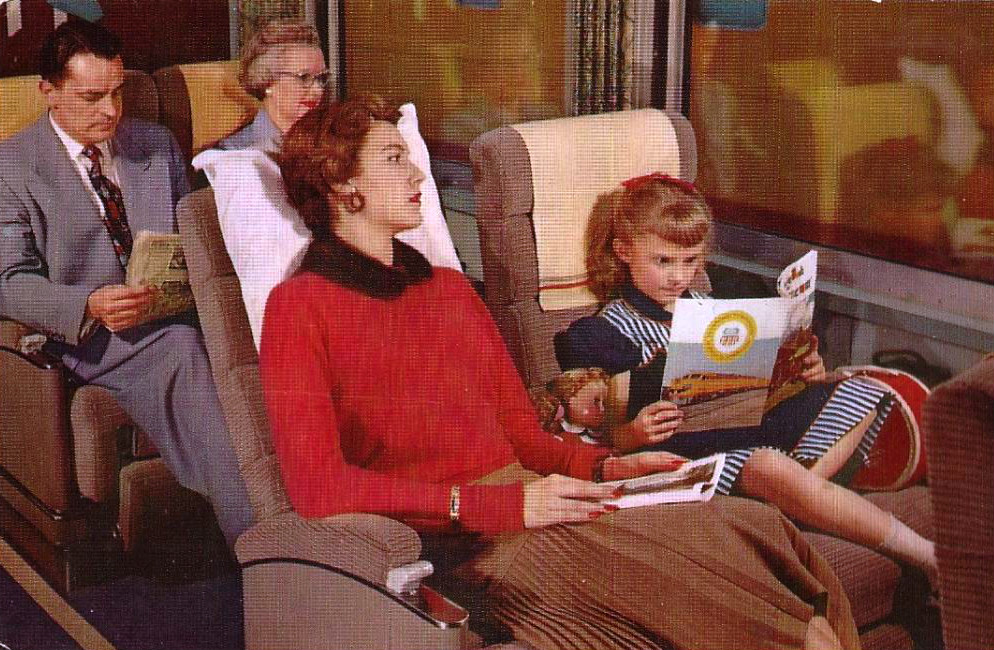
Coach car

== See also ==
- Passenger train service on the Chicago and North Western Railway
- Passenger train service on the Union Pacific Railroad
