= M-10002 =

Streamlined diesel trainset

The M-10002 at Cheyenne, Wyoming, March 7, 1937. The train's regular second locomotive unit is replaced by a unit from the M-10003 through M-10006 series. Note how it is higher and of a different profile.

The Union Pacific Railroad's M-10002 was a diesel-electric streamliner train built in 1936 by Pullman-Standard, with prime movers from the Winton Engine division of General Motors Corporation and General Electric generator, control equipment and traction motors. It was the UP's third streamliner, and the last turret-cab streamliner.

The original order was for two 1200 hp power cars, M-10002 and M-10003, of the same design as M-10001. However, the demands of Chicago-to-west-coast service led UP to expand the consists from six to nine cars and seek more power for the larger trainsets. Following the demonstration of multiple unit control systems with the EMC 1800 hp B-B units, the new technology was used to increase the power of M-10002 by adding a booster unit with the 900 hp engine that had been removed from M-10001 when it was rebuilt prior to entering regular service. The order for M-10003 was cancelled and the order number was used for one of the four more powerful locomotive sets built after M-10002.

The cab unit was fitted with a 1,200 hp (890 kW) V16 Winton 201-A diesel engine and booster was equipped with a 900 hp (670 kW) V12 Winton 201-A engine. The cab and booster units were articulated together with a span bolster, giving them an effective wheel arrangement of B-B+B-B, but they were not articulated with the train and therefore formed the Union Pacific's first separable diesel locomotive. The consist of nine passenger cars made it the longest streamliner trainset yet introduced.

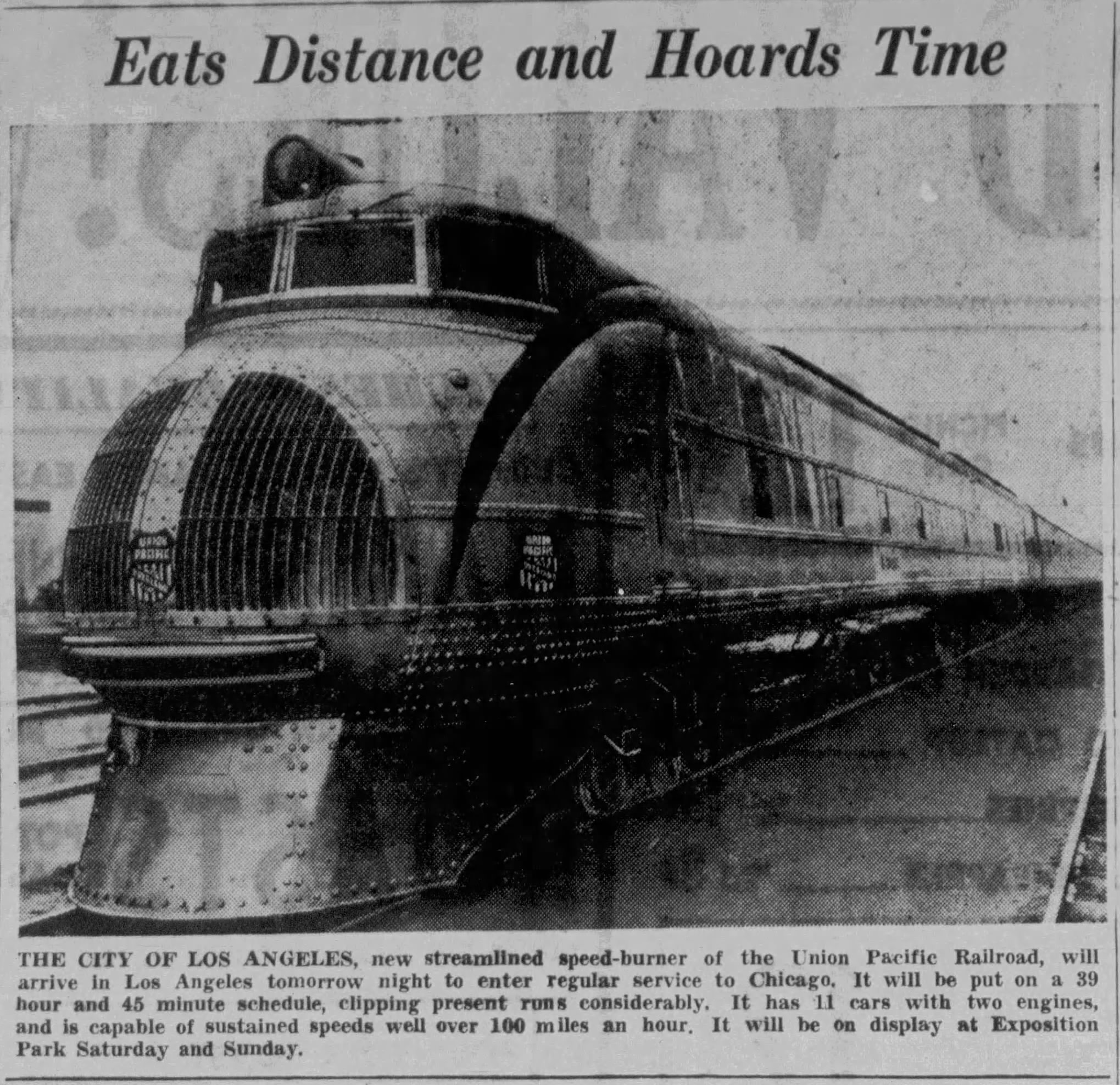
"THE CITY OF LOS ANGELES, new streamlined speed-burner of the Union Pacific Railroad," Los Angeles Illustrated Daily News, May 7, 1936

M-10002 entered service as the City of Los Angeles on May 15, 1936, the day after the Santa Fe Railroad introduced their first non-streamlined diesel-hauled, heavyweight Super Chief on their competing Chicago, Illinois to Los Angeles, California route. After the introduction of a full-sized train powered by the new EMC E2 locomotive as the City of Los Angeles in December 1937, the train was withdrawn from service for approximately three months then reassigned to the City of Portland to replace the M-10001. In July 1941, the train was replaced on that route with a train powered by an EMC E3 locomotive set and placed in storage. The train was reactivated in April 1942 to operate on a Portland-Seattle connection, then withdrawn for the third and final time in May 1943 and the passenger cars removed. The locomotive units were moved to El Segundo, California in December 1946, for experiments with coal-fueled gas turbine locomotive power by a Northrop-Hendy partnership; the project was abandoned and the locomotives were scrapped in December 1947.

M-10002 remained the longest in Chicago-to-west-coast service among the original fleet of Union Pacific streamliners, just under five years.
