= Bozeman station =

Former train station in Montana

Bozeman
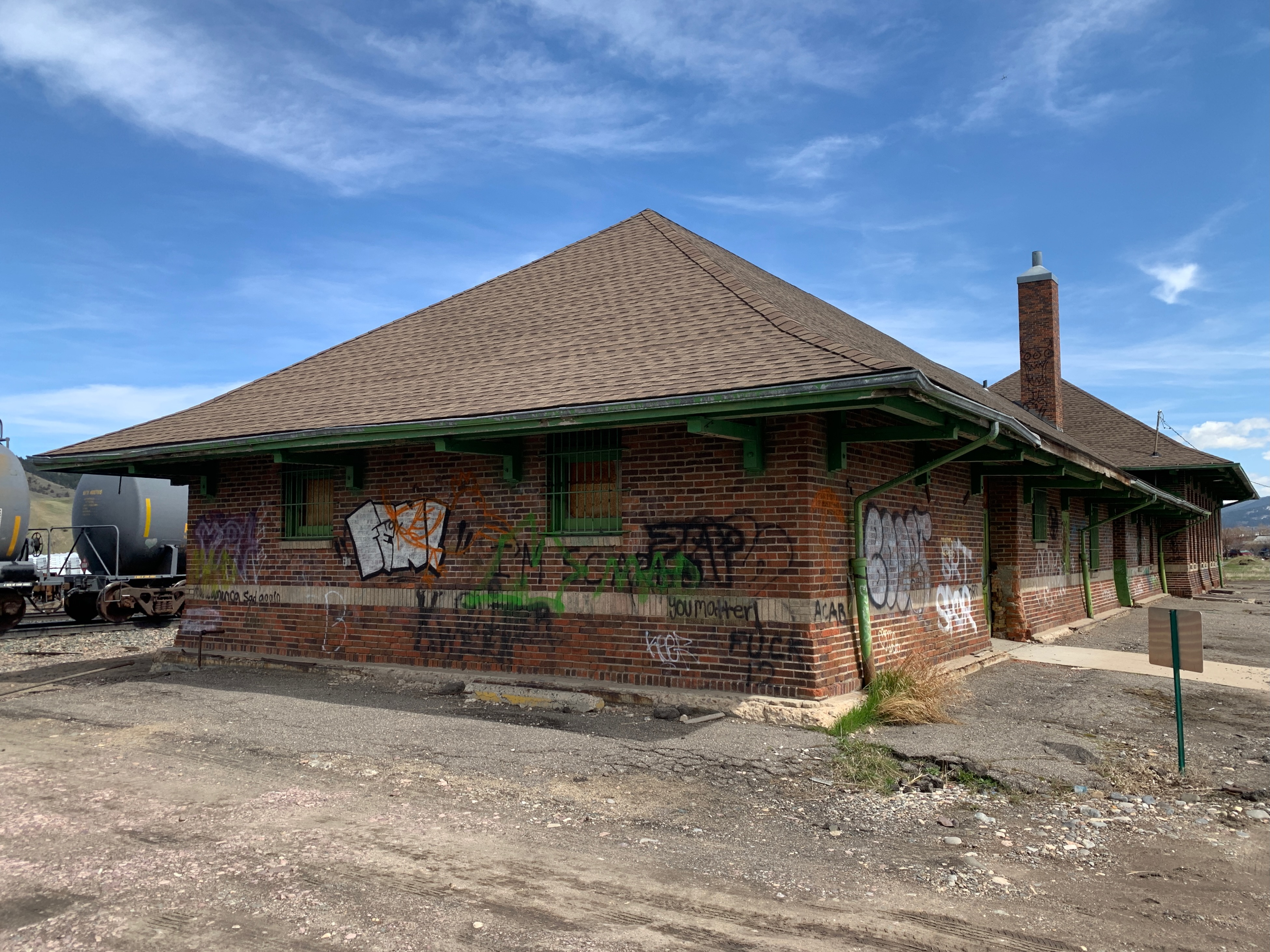
- Bozeman Depot in May 2022

General information
- Location: 820 Front Street; Bozeman, MT 59715; United States
- Coordinates: 45°41′18.78″N 111°1′35.62″W
- System: Inter-city rail station
- Owner: BNSF Railway

History
- Opened: 1883
- Closed: October 1979

Former services
Preceding station	Amtrak	Following station
Butte toward Seattle	North Coast Hiawatha	Livingston toward Chicago
Preceding station	Northern Pacific Railway	Following station
Story toward Seattle or Tacoma	Main Line	Fort Ellis toward St. Paul
Location

Bozeman Depot is a former train station in Bozeman, Montana, opened in 1883 by the Northern Pacific Railway. The current brick station house was built in 1892 and expanded in 1924.

Passenger rail service to Bozeman ended in 1979 when budget cuts forced Amtrak to discontinue the North Coast Hiawatha. Since then, various proposals have been raised for restoration of train service or adaptive reuse of the depot building.

The depot was also the northern terminus of the city's electric streetcar system, the Bozeman Street Railway, which existed from 1892 to 1921.

== History ==
The first railroad depot in Bozeman opened in 1883 when the transcontinental main line of the Northern Pacific Railway reached the city.

In 1891 a cinder from a passing steam locomotive ignited the wood depot building, causing severe fire damage. The city decided to rebuild at a grander scale since Bozeman was then competing to become the state capital of Montana. Completed in 1892, the new depot featured brick construction and Romanesque elements such as a large central turret.

On July 27, 1892, the Bozeman Street Railway began operating hydroelectric-powered trolleys on a 1.3-mile (2.1 km) route from Bozeman Depot to the corner of Main Street and Grand Avenue. Two extensions brought the system to 3.78 miles (6.08 km) in length by 1901, connecting to Montana State College at Montana Hall. Amid growing competition from automobiles, the system closed on December 15, 1921, when a snowstorm damaged the last trolley car.

In 1900 Northern Pacific inaugurated the North Coast Limited, an express train between Chicago and both Seattle and Portland that stopped at Bozeman Depot. The Alaskan ran over the same route but on a slower schedule, making more stops. In 1952 the Alaskan was replaced by the Mainstreeter.

A major expansion and renovation of the depot occurred in 1923–1924, when a wing was added to the southeastern side in order to accommodate increased passenger traffic. Taking Prairie School influences, the central turret was also removed and the entire façade was clad in red brick.

In 1970 the Northern Pacific merged with the Chicago, Burlington and Quincy Railroad, the Great Northern Railway, and the Spokane, Portland and Seattle Railway, forming the facility's new owner, the Burlington Northern Railroad.

Amtrak took over most inter-city passenger rail in the United States on May 1, 1971, including the Burlington Northern routes. The North Coast Limited and Mainstreeter were discontinued. Bozeman was left with no train service until pressure led by Senator Mike Mansfield resulted in Amtrak launching the North Coast Hiawatha in June.

=== End of passenger service ===
In October 1979 Amtrak discontinued the North Coast Hiawatha due to budget cuts, severing Bozeman and all of southern Montana from the national rail network. This left the Empire Builder as the only passenger rail service in the state, running on the former main line of the Great Northern Railway. Since then, Bozeman Depot has been closed to the public and used primarily for storage.

In 1987 Montana Rail Link leased the line and adjacent facilities, including Bozeman Depot, from Burlington Northern. In 1996 the Burlington Northern Railroad was merged with the Atchison, Topeka and Santa Fe Railway to form the BNSF Railway. In 2022 Montana Rail Link agreed to end its lease with BNSF, pending regulatory approval. In March 2023 federal regulators approved the lease termination and BNSF took ownership of Montana Rail Link on January 1, 2024.

In summer 1991 the trackside exterior of the depot was a filming location for A River Runs Through It, standing in for Missoula Depot.

=== Proposed future ===
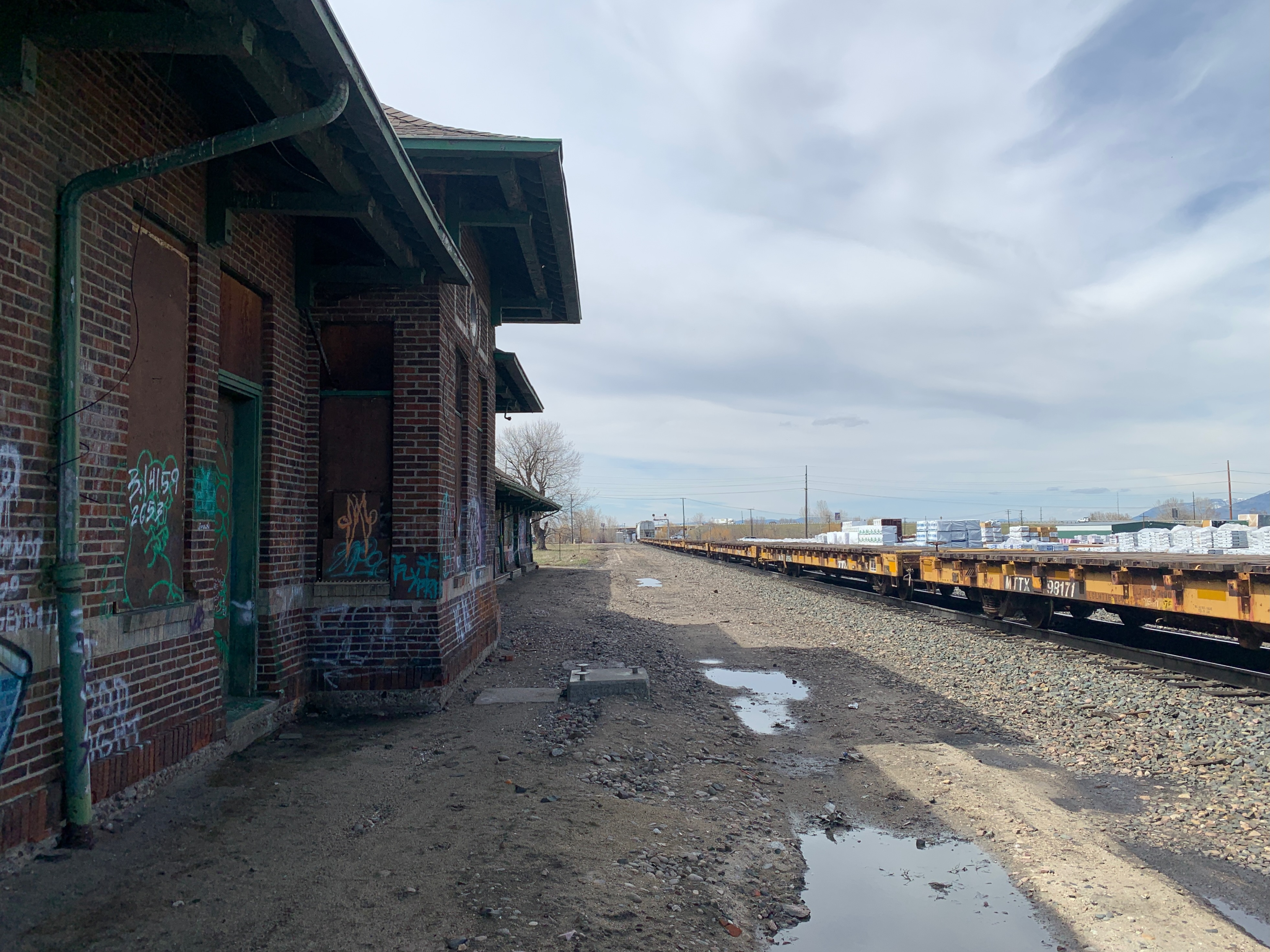
The track side of the depot in 2022. The platform has been removed

Many proposals have been made over the years for reuse of the depot, including as a microbrewery, restaurant, bar, library, community center, office, or martial arts studio. In 2013 stakeholders completed a structural analysis of the building as a first-step toward a potential renovation. In 2000 a pub, Montana Ale Works, opened in the old Northern Pacific freight depot nearby, but as of 2022 the passenger depot remains dormant.

In 2020 a group of Montana counties formed the Big Sky Passenger Rail Authority (BRSPA) with the goal of restoring service in southern Montana through Bozeman. In 2021 the authority played a role in securing language in the Infrastructure Investment and Jobs Act requiring USDOT to study restoration of the North Coast Hiawatha. The study must be completed by 2023.

In December 2023 BRSPA's Big Sky North Coast Corridor was selected for the Federal Railroad Administration's Corridor Identification and Development Program (CID) which provided and initial grant of $500,000 for further preparation of the Authority's service development plan.
