= Yakima station =

Former train station in Washington, United States

Yakima, WA
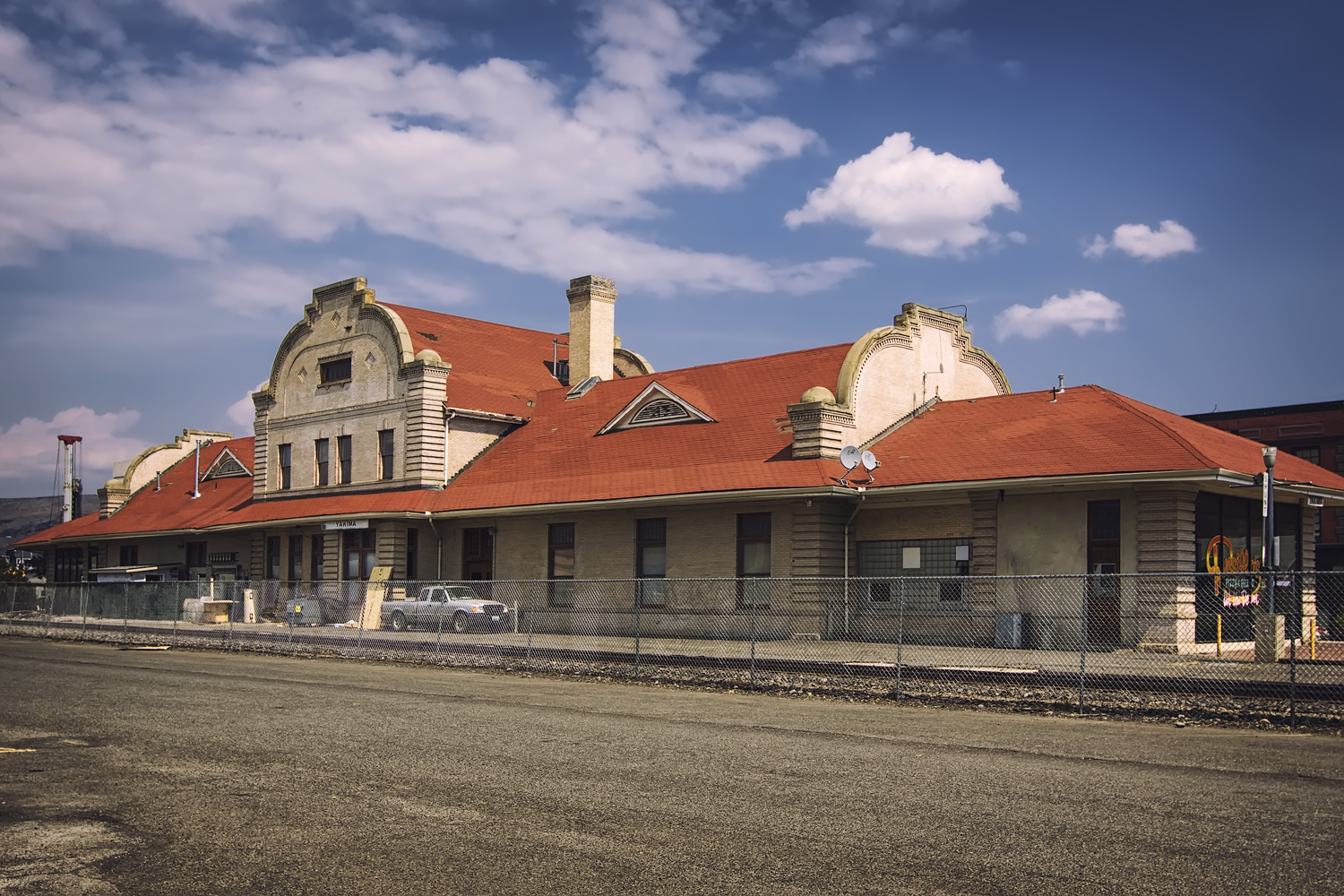
- 1910-built station

General information
- Location: 100 North Front Street; Yakima, Washington; U.S.
- Coordinates: 46°36′11″N 120°30′31″W
- System: Inter-city rail station
- Owner: BNSF Railway

History
- Opened: December 1884
- Closed: October 24, 1981
- Rebuilt: 1899; 1909–1910
- Former names: North Yakima (1884–1918)
- Original company: Northern Pacific Railway

Former services
Preceding station	Amtrak	Following station
Ellensburg toward Seattle	Empire Builder	Pasco toward Chicago
Ellensburg toward Seattle	North Coast Hiawatha 1971–1973	Pasco toward Chicago
Preceding station	Northern Pacific Railway	Following station
Ellensburg toward Seattle or Tacoma	Main Line	Pasco toward St. Paul
Location

Yakima was a train station in Yakima, Washington, last served by Amtrak trains in 1981. Built originally as part of the Northern Pacific Railway's transcontinental mainline, three stations existed on the same site since 1884.

== History ==
When the Northern Pacific reached county seat Yakima City in December 1884, the railroad bypassed the city, instead opting to build a depot north on a townsite platted by the railroad, dubbed North Yakima. This was met with legal action, but nonetheless buildings were moved from Yakima to the station site. Tensions boiled when the local newspaper, the Yakima Signal, was blown up with dynamite after being prepared to move north. Northern Pacific agreed to pay moving costs and population jumped to 1,200 in 1885, and a year later, the Yakima County seat was transferred to North Yakima. Yakima City renamed itself to Union Gap in 1917; North Yamika officially dropped the "North" a year later.

The original 1884 depot was an undistinguished timber building. In 1899, it was replaced with a much more larger Tudor structure designed by Cass Gilbert, who already had an impressive portfolio with the railway. The current building was constructed between 1909 and 1910 in the Mission Revival style, and now houses a restaurant.

The station was along the Northern Pacific's mainline to the Twin Cities and Chicago via Spokane, Washington. The station was a stop along the railroad's flagship North Coast Limited, inaugurated in 1900. The station would serve successor railroad Burlington Northern's transcontinental Mainstreeter and North Coast Limited until the eve of Amtrak on April 30, 1971.

=== Amtrak ===
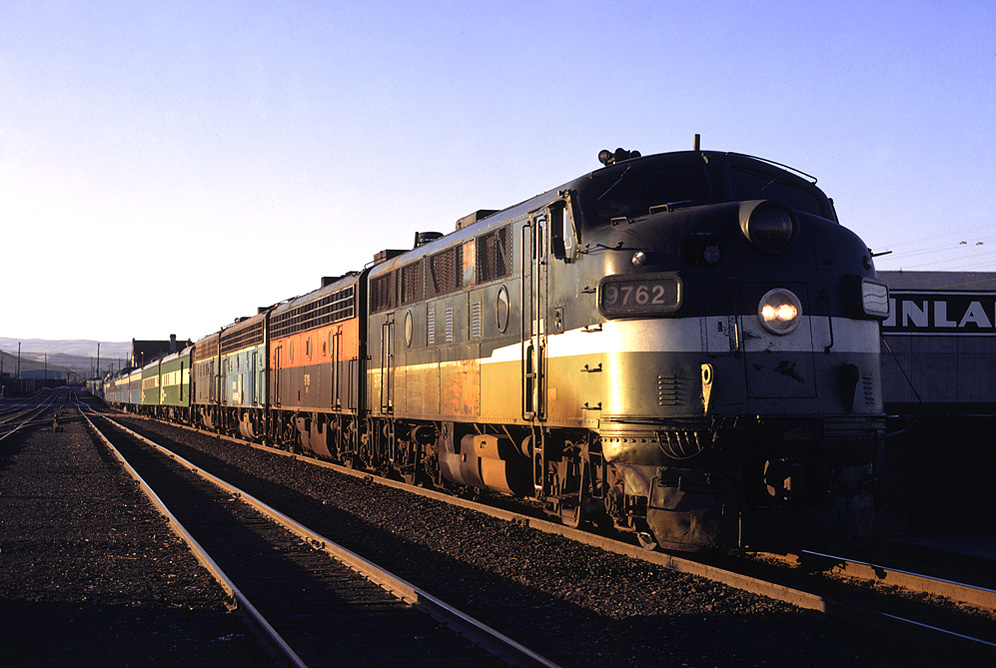
Amtrak's Empire Builder stopped at Yakima with a colorful display of Burlington Northern-heritage equipment, August 1971

When Amtrak took over intercity trains on May 1, 1971, only the Empire Builder was retained from Burlington Northern's four Seattle–Twin Cities–Chicago routes. There were some routing differences near each end of the line; the Milwaukee Road mainline was chosen between Minneapolis and Chicago via Milwaukee, Wisconsin. In the Pacific Northwest, Amtrak chose the Northern Pacific route via Stampede Pass between Spokane and Seattle, allowing them to serve a higher ridership base and more isolated communities.

In June that year, Amtrak scrambled to reestablish service into southern Montana, beginning June 14. The unnamed train would later be called the North Coast Hiawatha, a revival of the North Coast Limited albeit via the Milwaukee Road east of St. Paul, Minnesota. The train would not provide extra frequency however, operating as a section of the Empire Builder. Amtrak rerouted the North Coast Hiawatha on the traditional Empire Builder route via Stevens Pass.

The Empire Builder remained the only train on the Northern Transcon after the North Coast Hiawatha's discontinuance in 1979. Amtrak however was looking forward to reintroducing Portland–Chicago service. On October 25, 1981, a new section, dubbed the Baby Builder, separated at Spokane to Portland via ex-Spokane, Portland & Seattle Railway. This opportunity allowed Amtrak to move the Seattle–Spokane route back to the ex-Great Northern Empire Builder service, abandoning the Northern Pacific line. Service was retained one stop east at Pasco, Washington.

After Amtrak discontinuance, Burlington Northern mothballed the line in 1983. Burlington Northern began rehabilitating the line in 1995 and was reopened to traffic by successor railway BNSF in December 1996.

=== Future ===
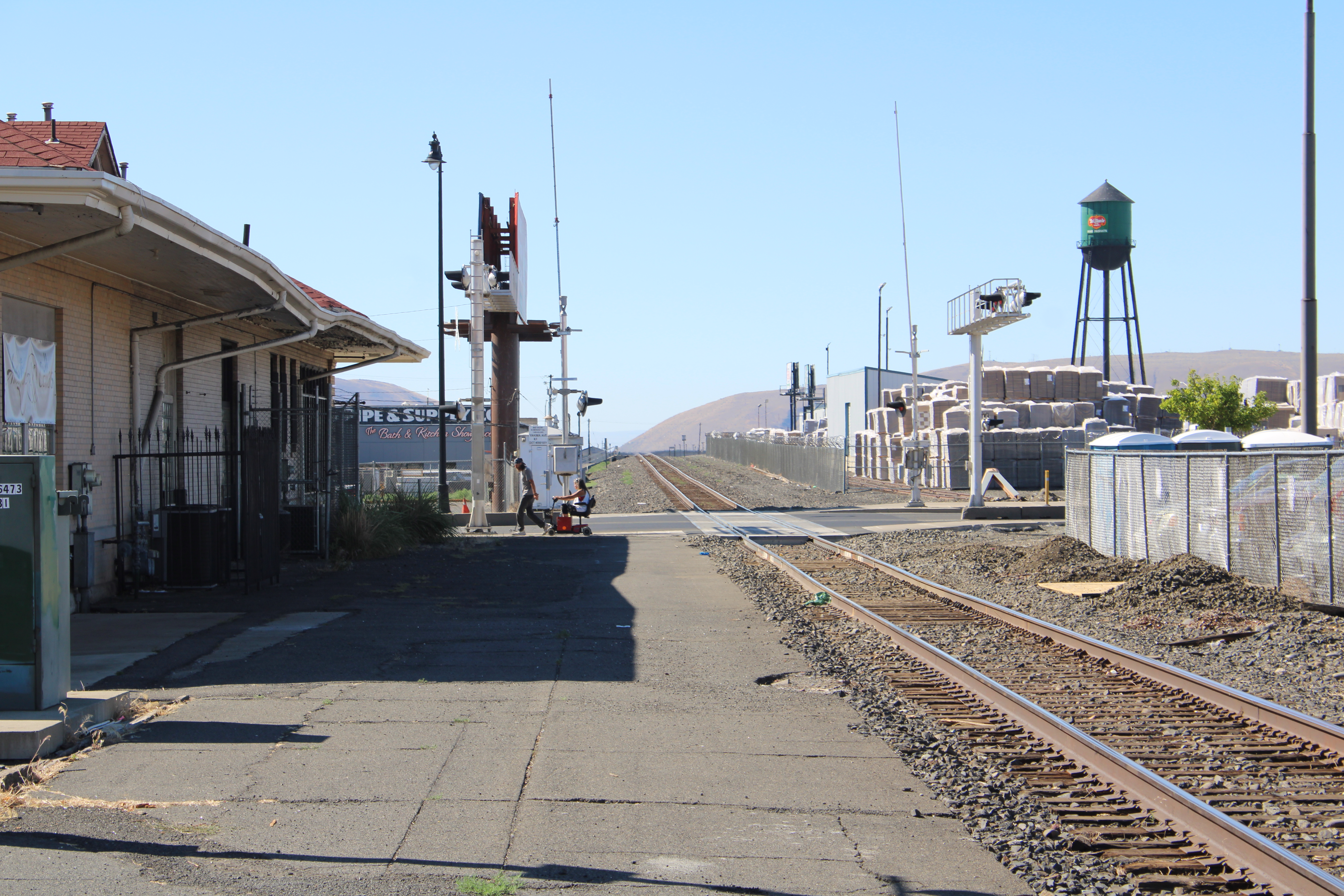
Looking eastbound from the platform

Advocates pushed for reactivating passenger rail service via Stampede Pass, and a 2020 study by the Washington State Joint Transportation Committee presented the route would generate 192,000 to 205,000 annual trips between Spokane and Seattle. The draft Amtrak Daily Long-Distance Service Study recommends a revival of the North Coast Hiawatha via Yakima.

== See also ==
- Big Sky Passenger Rail Authority
