= Livingston station (Northern Pacific Railway) =

Former train station in Montana

Livingston, MT
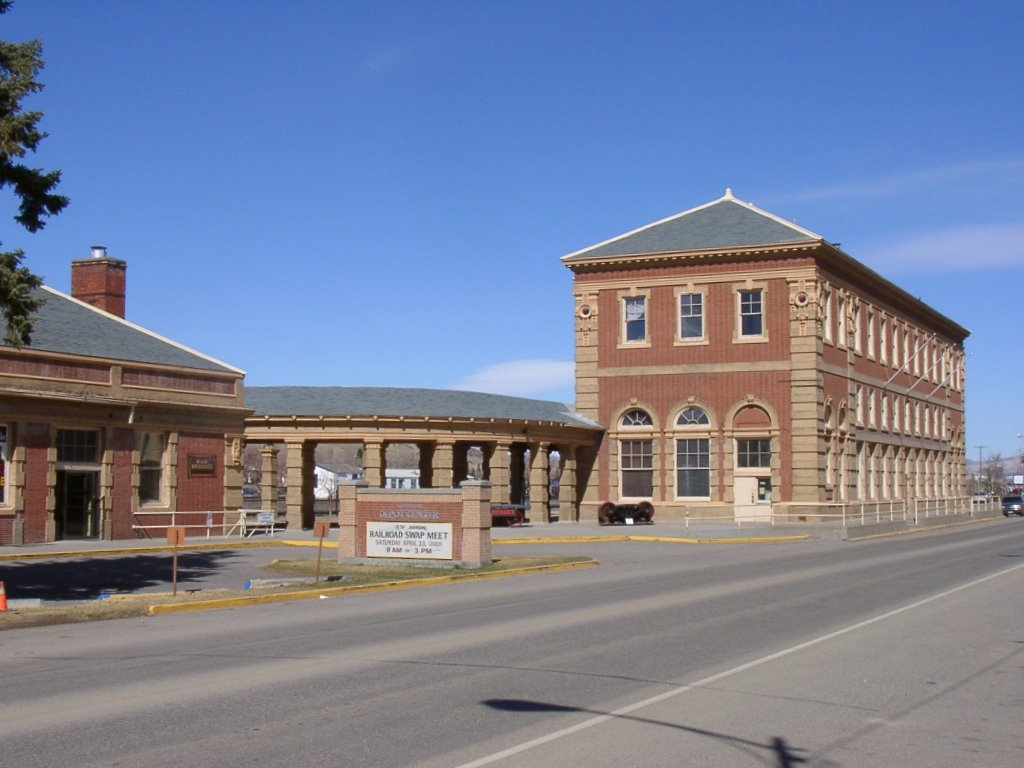
- The former Livingston station in 2005

General information
- Location: Park Street and Second Street; Livingston, Montana; United States
- Coordinates: 45°39′41″N 110°33′45″W
- Owner: City of Livingston
- Platforms: 1 side, 1 island platform (removed)
- Tracks: 2

History
- Opened: 1902
- Closed: October 1979

Former services
Preceding station	Amtrak	Following station
Bozeman toward Seattle	North Coast Hiawatha	Billings toward Chicago
Preceding station	Northern Pacific Railway	Following station
Bozeman toward Seattle or Tacoma	Main Line	Springdale toward St. Paul
Brisbin toward Gardiner	Yellowstone National Park Line	Terminus
Location

Livingston station is a former train station in Livingston, Montana, built by the Northern Pacific Railway in 1902. The station last saw passenger rail service in 1979 when Amtrak discontinued the North Coast Hiawatha. Since 1987 the restored building has anchored Livingston's downtown historic district as the Livingston Depot Center.

== History ==
Livingston station was designed by the Minnesota firm of Reed and Stem, the first architects for New York City's Grand Central Terminal in an Italianate style with red and yellow brick and ornate terra cotta detailing from lions' heads to floral figures and the Northern Pacific's trademark yin-yang emblem, and its interior includes inlaid terrazzo and tiling including the same NP emblem. It was constructed in approximately three years for $112,000 and dedicated in the summer of 1902.

The current facility accommodated traffic for both the main and Yellowstone Park Branch lines, and it and its predecessors thus functioned as the primary gateway to Yellowstone National Park for most of its visitors for approximately a quarter century. It served as the headquarters for the NP's Rocky Mountain division, including orders and telegraphy, and would host active rail traffic including the North Coast Limited runs. The complex combines a main building, a restaurant building, and a baggage building connected by a colonnade surrounding a courtyard facing the railroad tracks. Its shorter-lived precursors were an 1882 wooden facility, which burned down, and an 1888 brick structure, which grew to be inadequate for the rapidly increasing and somewhat affluent passenger traffic the NP was bringing to visit Yellowstone.

The earliest fortunes of the station were tied to the fate of the railroad. Initially it was a busy connection center, sited adjacent to the large Livingston shops complex and served as an NP division headquarters, being roughly equidistant between the termini of St. Paul, Minnesota, and Seattle, Washington. Toward about World War II, rail travel to the park tapered off heavily in favor of automobile visits, and chiefly charter excursions used the Yellowstone Park line. In 1970 the NP merged with the Chicago, Burlington and Quincy Railroad, Great Northern Railway, and Spokane, Portland and Seattle Railway, forming the facility's new owner, the Burlington Northern Railroad.

Passenger train service in the United States was taken over by Amtrak on May 1, 1971. Passenger service ended on the ex-NP, but resumed on June 14 with the North Coast Hiawatha. Amtrak discontinued the Hiawatha in October 1979, ending service to Livingston. By the mid-1980s the BN began unsuccessfully to seek a buyer for it. Local citizens lobbied for its donation to the city and adoption by the non-profit Livingston Depot Foundation which they created for its extensive restoration and subsequent operation.

In summer of 1987 the depot reopened as the Livingston Depot Center, as a museum and community center in the heart of the city. It continues to operate as of 2023. The museum is typically open from late May to mid-September. During the off-season the facility hosts wedding receptions, holiday parties, blues and other concerts, cards nights, historic talks, economic development forums, and similar events. A model railroad club meets in its basement. During Fourth of July weekend it hosts an arts festival in the adjacent Depot Rotary Park located parallel to the train tracks. The facility also underwent a roof restoration and restabilization project from approximately 2004 to 2007.
