= Slumbercoach =

Model of 18 American sleeping cars

Budd Slumbercoach
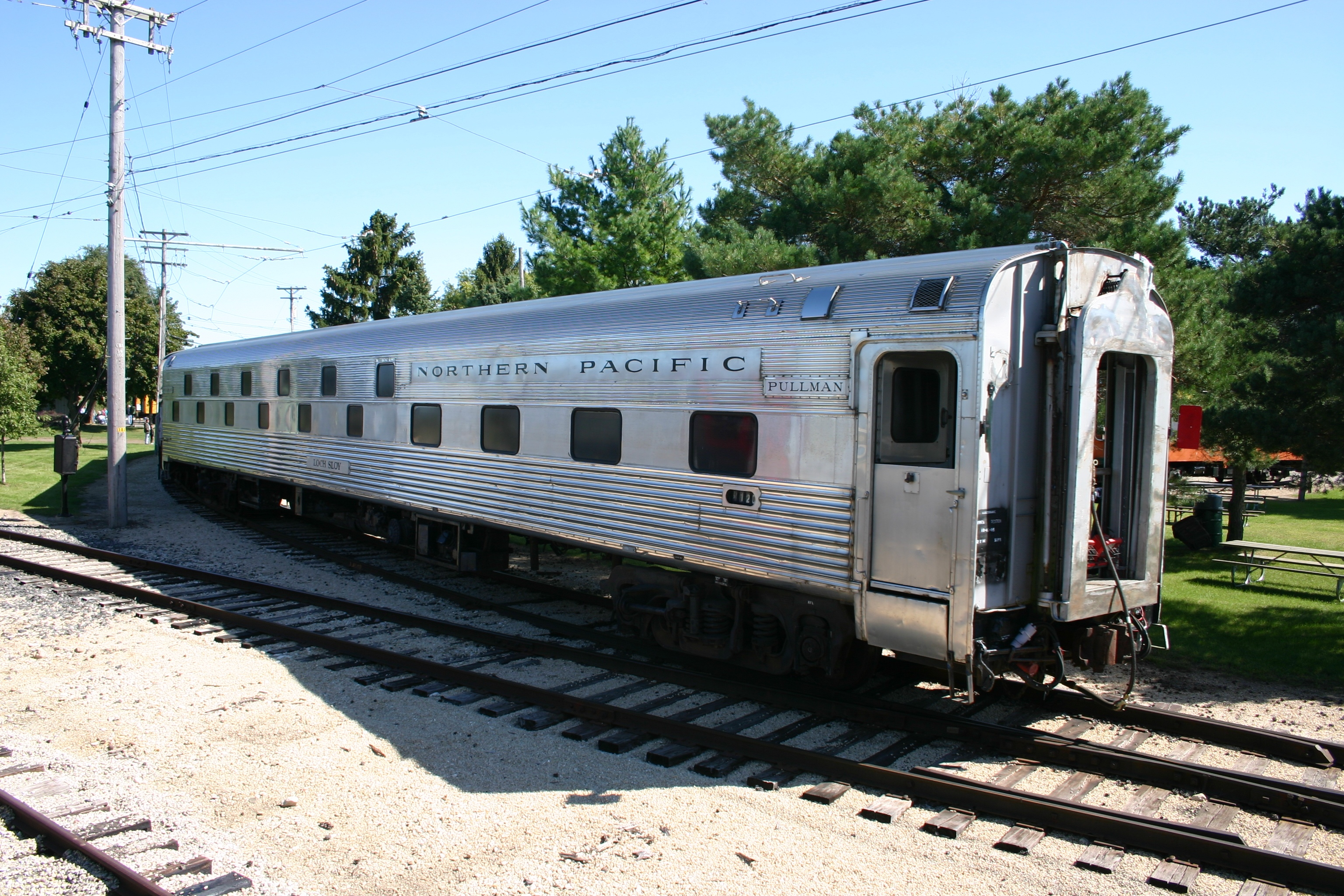
- Ex-NP 325, the "Loch Sloy," at the Illinois Railway Museum.
- Manufacturer: Budd Company
- Constructed: 1956–1959
- Number built: 28 (eighteen new; ten rebuilds)
- Number in service: None
- Capacity: 40 beds: 24 single rooms, eight double rooms (new); 36 beds: sixteen single rooms, ten double rooms (rebuilds)
- Operators: Chicago, Burlington and Quincy Railroad; Northern Pacific Railway; New York Central Railroad; Baltimore and Ohio Railroad; Missouri Pacific Railroad; Amtrak

Specifications
- Car body construction: Shotwelded stainless steel
- Car length: 85 ft 0 in (25.91 m)
- Braking system: Air
- Track gauge: 4 ft 8 1/2 in (1,435 mm)

The Slumbercoach is an 85-foot-long, 24 single room, eight double room streamlined sleeping car. Built in 1956 by the Budd Company for the Chicago, Burlington and Quincy Railroad for service on the Denver Zephyr, subsequent orders were placed in 1958 and 1959 by the Baltimore and Ohio Railroad and Missouri Pacific Railroad for the Texas Eagle/National Limited, then in 1959 by the Northern Pacific Railway for its North Coast Limited and also the New York Central Railroad for use on the 20th Century Limited.

== History ==
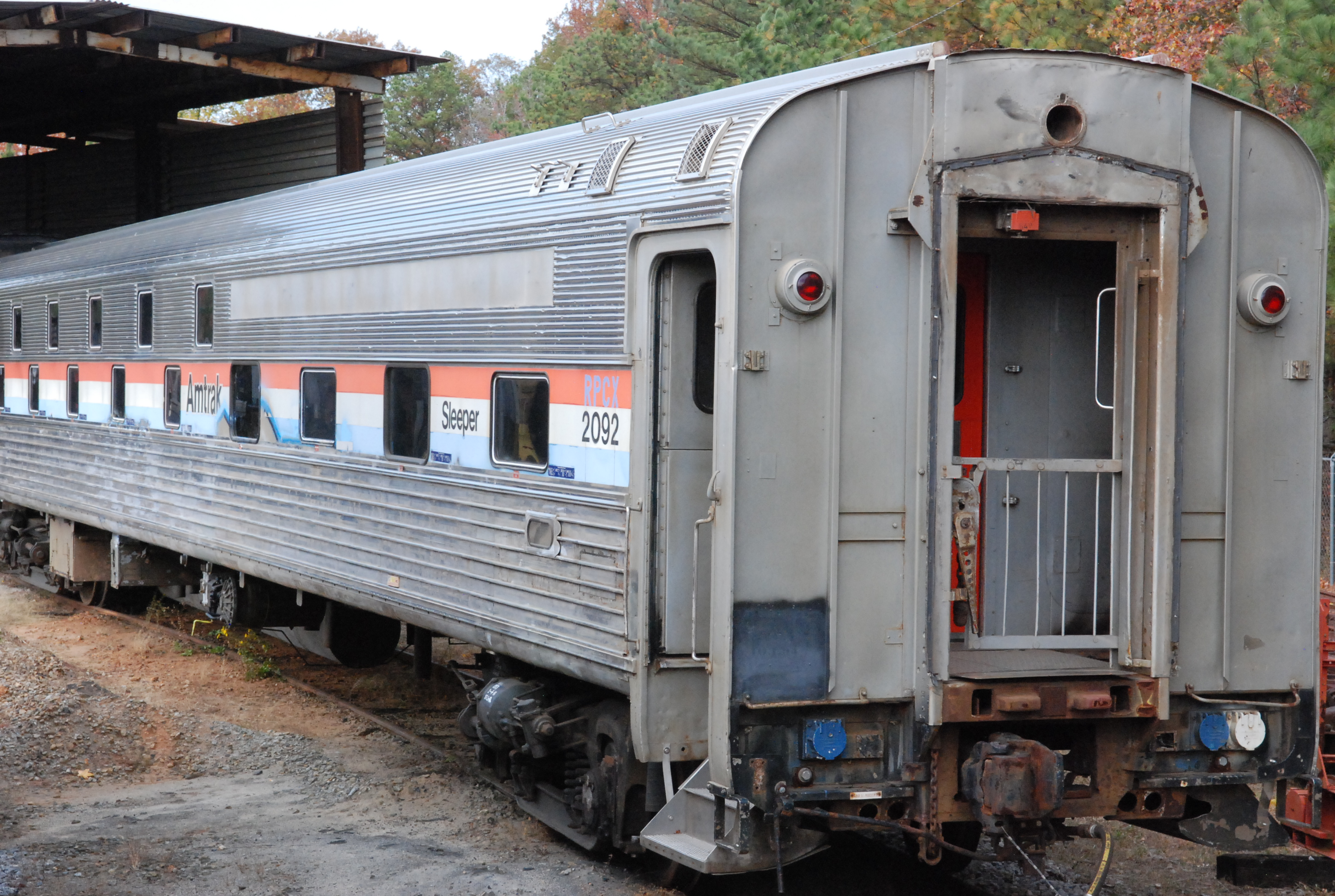
Loch Arkaig, still in Amtrak livery, at the Southeastern Railway Museum.

The Slumbercoach, in economic terms, was part of the American railways’ attempt, in the 1950s, to recapture market share lost to airlines, buses and the automobile by providing upgraded accommodations for non-first class passengers. Demand for private accommodation (bedrooms and roomettes) remained high, while demand for the traditional Pullman open section was declining. Other types of economy sleeping car did not have the capacity of the Slumbercoach: a sixteen roomette-four double bedroom car slept only 24, while the traditional sixteen section tourist Pullman slept 32. Thus, the Slumbercoach, sleeping 40, allowed railways to offer coach passengers private sleeping car accommodations at little more than coach fare. In its first year of using Slumbercoaches on the North Coast Limited, the Northern Pacific Railway averaged a 27 (out of 32 available) room occupancy rate, and a 34 (out of 40 at full capacity) passenger occupancy rate."

In late 1964 and early 1965, the Northern Pacific bought eight Slumbercoaches second-hand. Four came from the New York Central, three from the Baltimore and Ohio, and the Missouri Pacific's lone car. This enabled the NP to expand Slumbercoaches to its secondary transcontinental passenger train, the Mainstreeter, and to discontinue the pooling of Slumbercoaches between the North Coast Limited and Burlington's Denver Zephyr.

A total of eighteen Slumbercoaches were built by Budd, with an additional ten rebuilt from Budd 22 roomette sleepers by the New York Central. (On the Central these were known as Sleepercoaches.) Unlike the original eighteen, the rebuilds had ten duplex and sixteen single rooms, giving a maximum capacity of 36.

Amtrak operated all of these cars, save for three previously-wrecked and scrapped by the New York Central. Two, built for the Baltimore and Ohio's Columbian, were not acquired by Amtrak until the early 1980s. The first Amtrak loss was on July 7, 1984, when the northbound Montrealer hit a washed-out culvert, destroying Slumbercoach 2083, originally owned by the New York Central Railroad.

About the same time, ex-Denver Zephyr Slumbercoach 2086, the Silver Siesta, was burned by vandals between runs at Sunnyside Yard in Queens, New York. Most of Amtrak's remaining Slumbercoaches were retired in the 1990s, with the last being put up for sale in 2001.

Internationally, the Slumbercoach can be compared to second-class or "hard" sleeper facilities on Asian and European lines, but economically comparable facilities such as those provided on the Train Bleu between Paris and the south of France, which de-emphasized privacy, and in place of this provided multiple-occupant couchette compartments with fold-away beds. The development of midlevel accommodation like the Slumbercoach has ceased, due to changing demand in mass transit.

== Design and pricing ==
Slumbercoaches contained a central aisle flanked on each side of the car by one-person and two-person rooms with one or two narrow, six-foot-long beds provided with basic sheets and blankets. Each room featured a fold-away wash basin and private toilet similar in design to contemporary standard Pullman, but on a smaller scale. A detailed diagram is available here.

To maximize the number of rooms per car, the designers chose a duplex or staggered design for the single rooms such that every other room was accessible by a small flight of steps. This allowed beds in the car to either overlay or underlay the room in front of it.

Western railways (and some Eastern lines) chose to redesign the coach seat for greater width and comfort, with the result that by the time U.S. passenger rail transport was nationalized, railway coach seats provided, at a basic price, comfort available only in first-class on airlines. Amtrak used these popular cars well into the 1990s.

In 1980, Slumbercoaches were operated on Amtrak's Montrealer, Lake Shore Limited, Night Owl, Broadway Limited, and Silver Meteor. At the time, the cost of a Slumbercoach ticket was $16.50 a night extra on the New York-Montreal train, as compared to $39.50 for a full-size roomette, and $24 versus $71 for the roomette on the New York-St. Petersburg train. Those prices were charged in addition to the price of a coach ticket.

== Preservation ==
Numerous Slumbercoaches have been preserved, including:

- Silver Repose — Built 1956 for Burlington's Denver Zephyr, current location: Tennessee Central Railway Museum, Nashville, Tennessee.
- Silver Slumber — Built 1956 for Burlington's Denver Zephyr, current location: Gold Coast Railroad Museum, Miami, Florida.
- Dreamland — Built 1956 for B&O's Columbian, current location: Baltimore and Ohio Railroad Museum, Baltimore, Maryland.
- Loch Sloy — Built 1959 for NP/CB&Q North Coast Limited, current location: Illinois Railway Museum, Union, Illinois.
- Loch Arkaig — Built 1959 for the New York Central's 20th Century Limited, later used by the Northern Pacific, current location: Southeastern Railway Museum, Duluth, Georgia.
- Loch Tarbet — Built 1959 for Missouri Pacific as #699 "Southland" then bought by Northern Pacific and ran as #329 "Loch Tarbet". Ran by Amtrak as number 2090 after conversion to HEP. Current location: Museum of the American Railroad, Frisco, Texas.
- Loch Ness- Built in 1959 for the Northern Pacific Railway as #328. Retired from Amtrak in 1996. Acquired by Webb Rail in 2018. Current location: Stored in New Orleans, LA awaiting restoration.

== See also ==
- Roomette
