= Butte station =

Former train station in Montana

Butte, MT
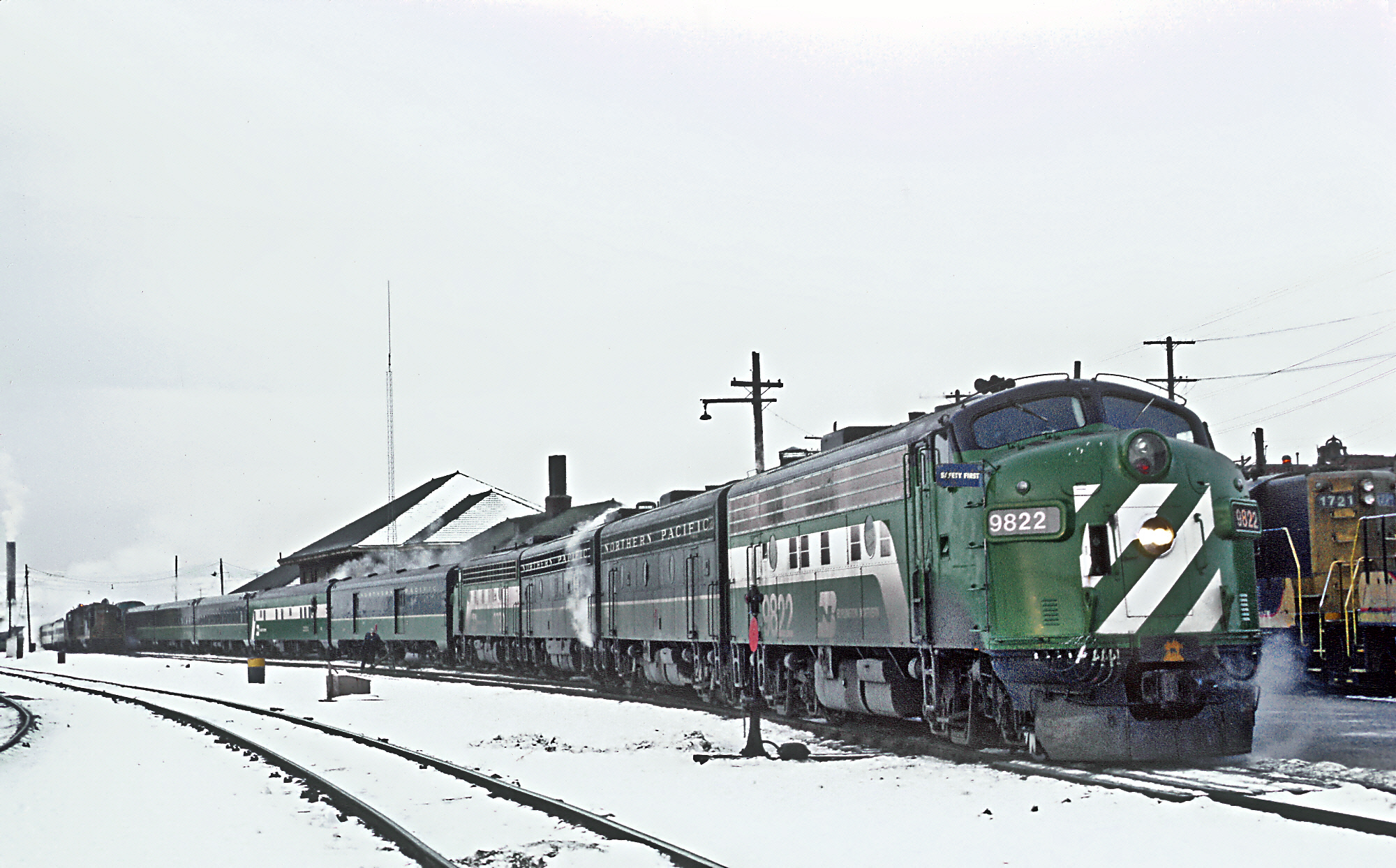
- The North Coast Limited at Butte station in 1970

General information
- Location: 800 East Front Street, Butte, Montana; USA
- Coordinates: 46°00′05″N 112°31′34″W
- System: inter-city rail station

History
- Opened: 1906
- Closed: 1979

Former services
Preceding station	Amtrak	Following station
Deer Lodge toward Seattle	North Coast Hiawatha	Bozeman toward Chicago
Preceding station	Northern Pacific Railway	Following station
Silver Bow toward Seattle or Tacoma	Main Line	Whitehall toward St. Paul
Preceding station	Union Pacific Railroad	Following station
Terminus	Butte – Salt Lake City	Silver Bow toward Salt Lake City
Preceding station	Milwaukee Road	Following station
Silver Bow toward Seattle or Tacoma	Main Line	Sappington toward Chicago
Location

The Butte Depot is a Northern Pacific Railway train station in Butte, Montana, built in 1906. It originally served both the Northern Pacific and Union Pacific railroads. In 1970 the NP merged with the Chicago, Burlington and Quincy Railroad, Great Northern Railway, and Spokane, Portland and Seattle Railway, forming the facility's new owner, the Burlington Northern Railroad; passenger train service was taken over by Amtrak in 1971. In 1979 Amtrak discontinued the North Coast Hiawatha due to budget cuts, leaving the Empire Builder on the former Great Northern Railway line, as the only passenger rail service through Montana.

== See also ==
- Butte, Montana
- Silver Bow County, Montana
