= Ellensburg station =

Historic train station in Washington state

Ellensburg, WA
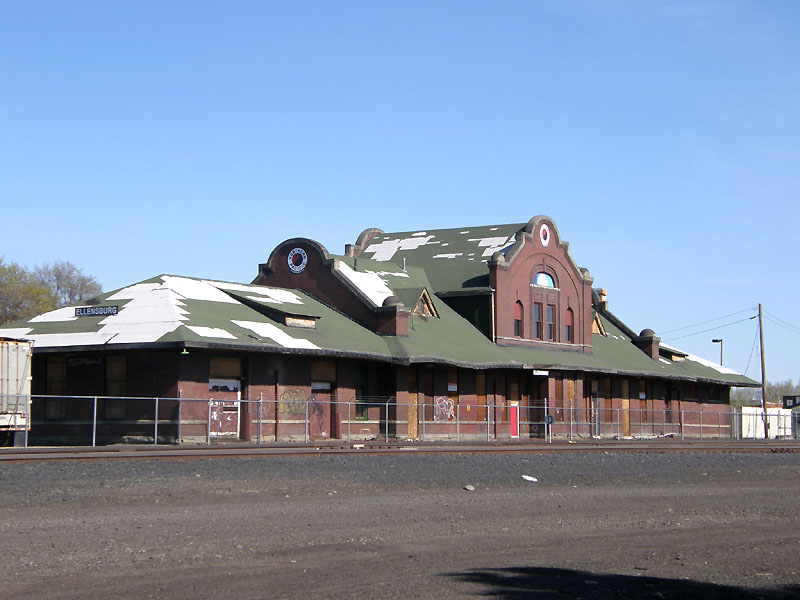

General information
- Location: 606 W. Third St. Ellensburg, Washington
- Coordinates: 46°59′40″N 120°33′25″W

History
- Opened: 1886
- Closed: October 25, 1991
- Rebuilt: 1910

Services
Preceding station	Amtrak	Following station
East Auburn toward Seattle	Empire Builder	Yakima toward Chicago
East Auburn toward Seattle	North Coast Hiawatha 1971–1973	Yakima toward Chicago
Preceding station	Northern Pacific Railway	Following station
Cle Elum toward Seattle or Tacoma	Main Line	Yakima toward St. Paul
- Northern Pacific Railway Passenger Depot
- U.S. National Register of Historic Places
- NRHP reference No.: 91001438
- Added to NRHP: September 26, 1991
Location

Ellensburg station is a former train station in Ellensburg, Washington. Transcontinental trains of the Northern Pacific Railway reached the station in 1886. The modern station building was built in 1910. It was the second depot built to a standard design initially adopted with the North Yakima station. It was added to the National Register of Historic Places on September 26, 1991. Amtrak service ceased on October 25, 1991, when the Empire Builder added a new leg to serve Portland, Oregon.
