= Streamliner cars (rail) =

Former American railcars

The streamliner cars are a class of streamlined passenger railroad cars built from the 1930s through the 1960s for long distance passenger train services in North America.

== Predecessors ==
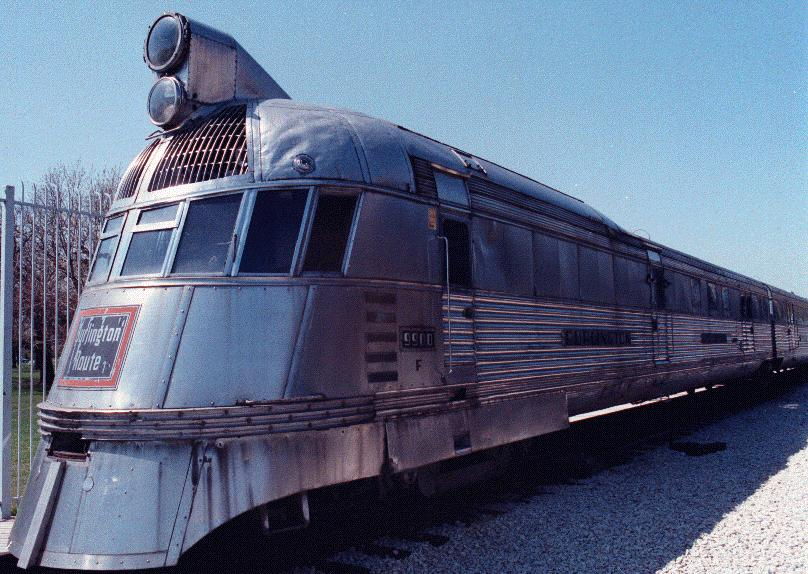
The Pioneer Zephyr

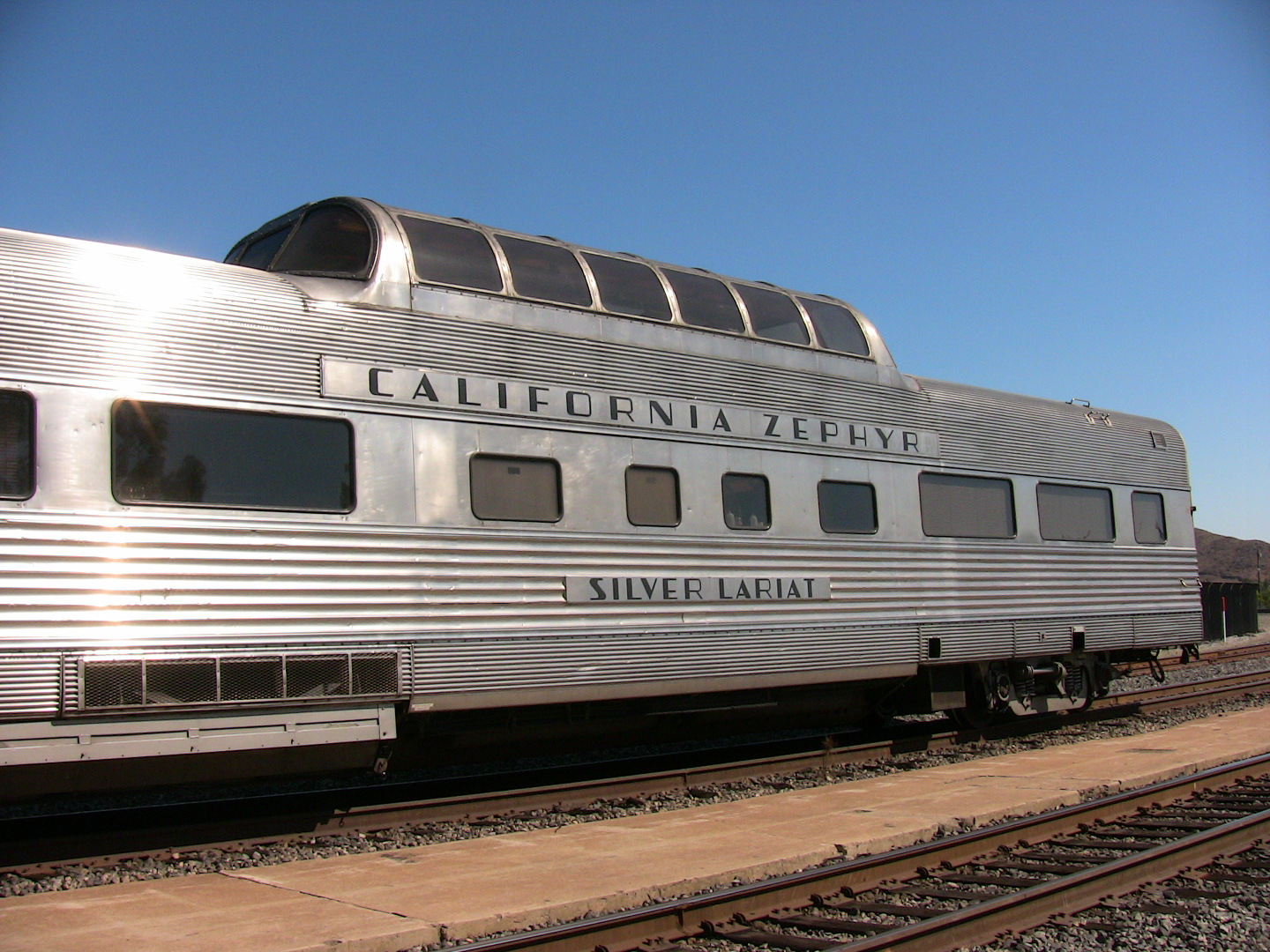
Vista Dome car

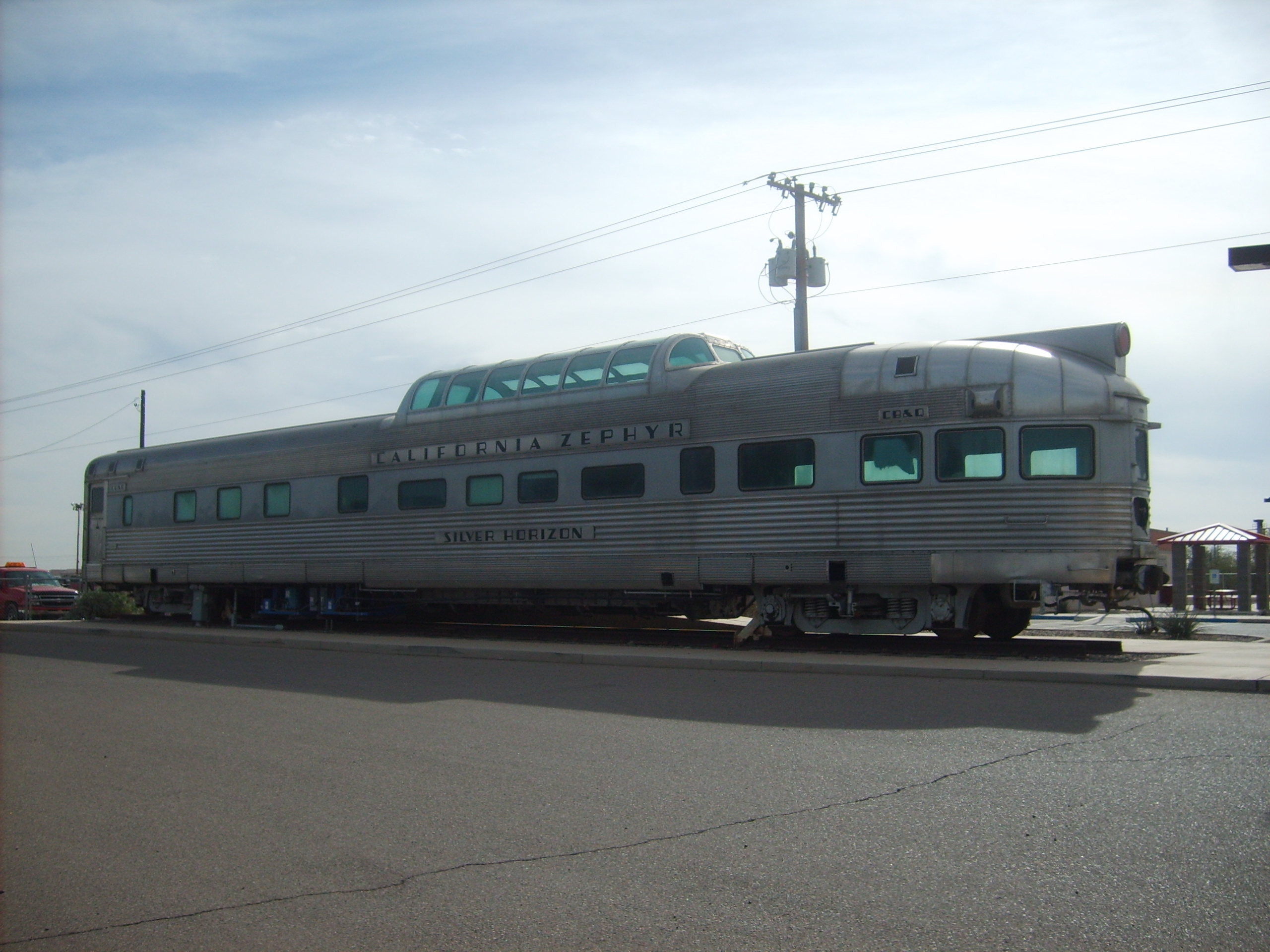
Dome observation car

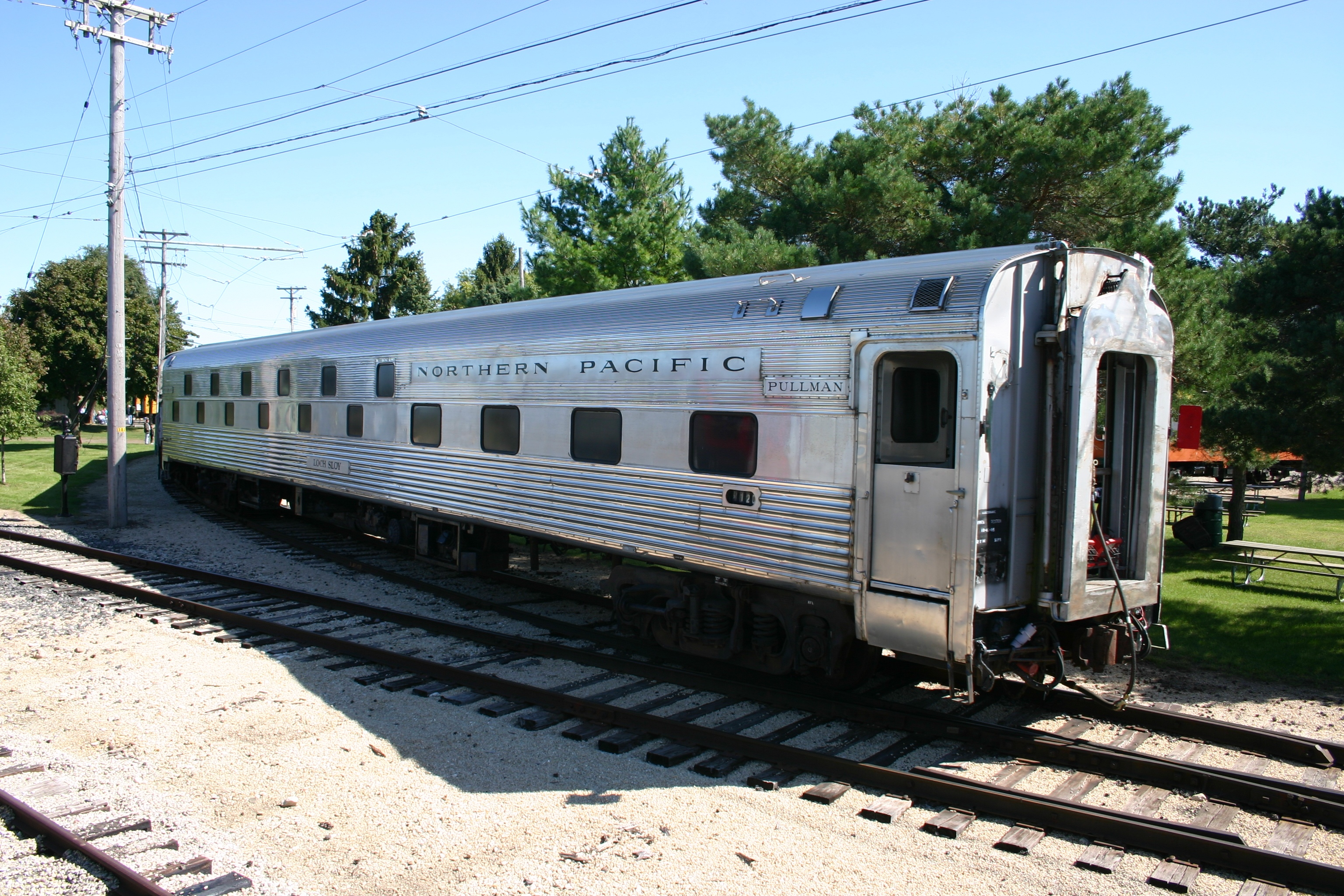
Slumbercoach

The first streamliner in the United States was the M-10000 in service with the Union Pacific Railroad in February 1934. The second was the Pioneer Zephyr in service with the Chicago, Burlington and Quincy Railroad. Both were built as Diesel Multiple-Units; the M-10000 was made of aluminum and the Pioneer Zephyr of stainless steel.

== Modernization ==
In 1944 American Car and Foundry (ACF) was visited by the Spanish inventor Goicoechea looking for a manufacturer for his invention, the lightweight articulated streamlined Talgo. ACF and Goicoechea signed the contract on December 8, 1945 and ACF began fabricating three trainsets, two for Spain and one for demonstration and experimental purposes in the USA. ACF built the Talgo using a lightmetal body like Budd's Pioneer Zephyr including the non-European observation cars at the rear. It wasn't until 1955 that ACF could sell the Talgo concept but they became familiar with the techniques needed.

After World War II the railroad companies in the United States wanted to modernize their fleets of passenger cars. They chose the flexibility of individual cars instead of multiple-units or Talgo. However the design of the streamlined cars was derived from the Pioneer Zephyr, although the Pullman cars got a smooth body surface and the others the typical ribbed body surface. The streamliner cars were built by three railcar manufacturers: the Budd Company, Pullman Standard, and ACF. Nine primary types were produced:

- Railway post office
- Baggage car
- Dormitory car (for onboard staff)
- Coach car
- Lounge car (various types)
- Dining car
- Sleeping car (various types)
- Dome car (various types)
- Observation car (various types)

== In operation ==
From the 1930s through the 1950s, many trains in the United States and Canada were upgraded with streamliner cars. One of the most notable trains equipped with such cars was the California Zephyr, jointly operated by Chicago, Burlington and Quincy Railroad (CB&Q), Denver and Rio Grande Western Railroad (D&RGW) and Western Pacific Railroad (WP). By 1955 the Canadian National Railway (CN) and the Canadian Pacific Railway (CP) also operated trains with streamliner cars, such CP's The Canadian and CN's Super Continental.

Operator	Service(s)	introduced
Atlantic Coast Line Railroad	Champion	1939
Baltimore and Ohio Railroad	Columbian	1931 (Note: Streamlined in 1949.)
Chicago, Burlington and Quincy Railroad	Pioneer Zephyr	1934
Great Northern Railway	Empire Builder	1929 (Note: Streamlined in 1947.)
Louisville and Nashville Railroad	Humming Bird	1946
Missouri Pacific Railroad	Texas Eagle	1948
Pennsylvania Railroad	Broadway Limited	1912 (Note: Streamlined in 1938.)
New York Central Railroad	20th Century Limited	1902
Northern Pacific Railway	North Coast Limited	1900 (Note: Streamlined in 1946.)
Denver and Rio Grande Western Railroad	Prospector	1941
Atchison, Topeka and Santa Fe Railway	Super Chief	1937
Seaboard Air Line Railroad	Silver Meteor	1939
Southern Pacific Railroad	Coast Daylight	1922 (Note: Streamlined in 1937.)
Western Pacific Railroad	California Zephyr	1949
Canadian National Railway	Super Continental	1955
Canadian Pacific Railway	The Canadian	1955

In 1971, Amtrak took over all intercity passenger rail service in the United States. Approximately 1200 streamliner cars were inherited by Amtrak to run these services. In the late 1970s Amtrak began a program to rebuild these cars to use Head-end power (HEP). These rebuilt cars were known as the Heritage Fleet. This rebuild program extended the lifetime of most of the cars by about 20-40 years, as most were used until the late 1990s/early 2000s, with some cars, chiefly baggage and dining cars, used into the late 2010s, until Amtrak retired all of its heritage equipment in 2019. The Canadian, now operated by Via Rail, is the only train in North America that still operates with a full "streamliner" trainset.
