= Salt Lake City Union Pacific Depot =

Historic building in Salt Lake City, Utah

Salt Lake City
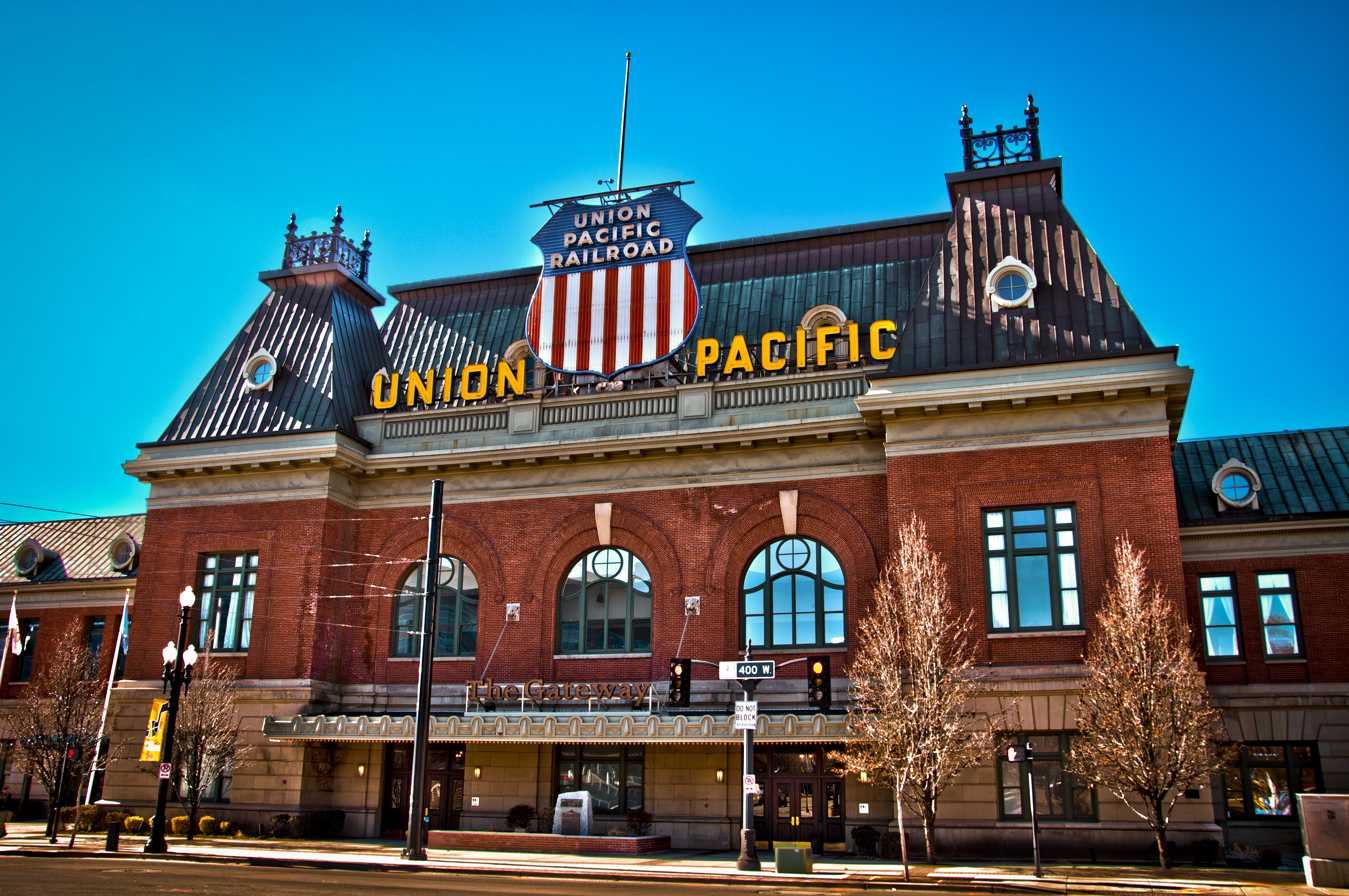
- Union Pacific Depot in 2011

General information
- Location: South Temple at 400 West; Salt Lake City, Utah; United States
- System: Former Union Pacific Railroad and Amtrak station
- Tracks: None remaining

Construction
- Structure type: At-grade

History
- Opened: 1908
- Closed: 1986 (for passenger rail service)

Former services
Preceding station	Amtrak	Following station
Delta toward Los Angeles	Desert Wind	Ogden toward Chicago
Milford toward Los Angeles	Desert Wind	Ogden toward Chicago
Ogden toward Seattle	Pioneer	Terminus
Preceding station	Union Pacific Railroad	Following station
Sandy toward Los Angeles	Los Angeles and Salt Lake Railroad	Terminus
North Salt Lake toward Butte	Butte – Salt Lake City	Terminus
- Salt Lake Union Pacific Railroad Station
- U.S. National Register of Historic Places
- Location within Utah Location within the United States
- Coordinates: 40°46′10″N 111°54′9″W
- Area: 1 acre (0.40 ha)
- Built: 1908
- Architect: D. J. Patterson and John Dove Isaacs
- Architectural style: Late 19th and 20th Century Revivals, French Renaissance
- NRHP reference No.: 75001818
- Added to NRHP: July 9, 1975
Location

The Salt Lake City Union Pacific Depot is a building on the western edge of downtown Salt Lake City, Utah, United States. Built in 1908–09, it dates back to the more prosperous era in the history of American railroad travel. As Salt Lake Union Pacific Railroad Station, it is listed on the National Register of Historic Places. In 2024 it was repurposed as a hotel, Asher Adams, Autograph Collection, with the historic structure containing the hotel's lobby, restaurants, function rooms, and 13 luxury suites and a new building behind it containing 212 hotel rooms.

== History ==
Originally called the Union Station, it was jointly constructed by the San Pedro, Los Angeles and Salt Lake Railroad and the Oregon Short Line, both later wholly owned by the Union Pacific, at an estimated cost of $450,000 ($17,420,000 in 2025 dollars). The platforms behind the station ran north-to-south, parallel to the first main line built in the Salt Lake Valley, which predated the station building. South of 1300 South this is the route used by the UTA TRAX Blue Line and Salt Lake City Southern, while north of North Temple (100 North) it is used by the FrontRunner line and Union Pacific. Trains from the west used a line south of 900 South in Glendale to approach the north-to-south platforms. The Bamberger Railroad & Salt Lake and Utah Railroad Interurban lines also stopped at their own station nearby. When Amtrak was formed in 1971, it took over the remaining passenger services at the station, but after Rio Grande joined Amtrak all trains were moved to its station three blocks south.

=== Amtrak ===
From 1977 to 1986 the depot served as Salt Lake City's Amtrak station, but was then replaced by the Denver and Rio Grande Western Depot. It was served by the Desert Wind, and Pioneer trains, both of which were discontinued in 1997; until its route was reconfigured in 1983, this station served as the Pioneer's terminus. The Desert Wind ran daily from Chicago to Los Angeles and the Pioneer ran daily Chicago to Seattle. In 1999 Amtrak moved to the Salt Lake City Intermodal Hub.

=== Adaptive reuse ===
In 1989, the State of Utah received the historical building as a donation. The main lobby, no longer used by Amtrak (which has relocated to the Rio Grande Depot and later the Salt Lake City Intermodal Hub), was acquired in 1999 by the developers of a nearby mall, The Gateway. Most of the building was not used for its original purpose, but Union Pacific used some of the space for offices and training areas.

In January 2006, part of the Union Pacific Depot became a restaurant and music venue, known as The Depot. The venue, operated by Live Nation Entertainment, has 1,200 seats across two levels. In 2016, The Gateway was acquired by Oaktree Capital Management and Vestar, which subsequently announced plans in 2018 to open a hotel in the Union Pacific Depot. The hotel, which was originally to have opened in 2021, was to have 225 rooms within a new eight-story annex. The Union Pacific Depot would become a main entrance for the hotel, with retail and eateries; the Depot performance venue would have continued to operate in the building's northern end. Salt Lake City's City Council voted in May 2019 to give the hotel's developers a $7 million loan to help fund the hotel's construction.

Progress on the hotel was delayed during the COVID-19 pandemic, and the hotel's developers were required to preserve the building as a publicly-accessible space due to an existing easement on the property. The renovation included preserving existing historical features such as stained-glass windows, gold foil, and tiles, in addition to constructing amenity areas for the hotel. The Asher Adams Hotel was named after cartographers John R. Asher and George H. Adams, who were the first to depict railroad routes. On October 31, 2024, the Union Pacific Depot reopened as the Asher Adams, Autograph Collection hotel, operated as part of Marriott International's Autograph Collection hotel brand. The historic structure contains the hotel's lobby, restaurants, function rooms, and 13 luxury suites, and a new building behind it contains 212 hotel rooms. The hotel also has two bars.

== Architecture ==
According to The Railway Gazette (1907) the structure's plans came from the office of J.H. Wallace, Assistant Chief Engineer of the Southern Pacific, under the direction of D.J. Patterson, Architect for that company. It served the San Pedro, Los Angeles and Salt Lake and the Oregon Short Line when it was completed in 1909 and became wholly owned by Union Pacific in the 1920s. Initially, both railroads' initials were prominently displayed on the front of the building, but the "Union Pacific" shield or related logo has graced the depot for most of its history.

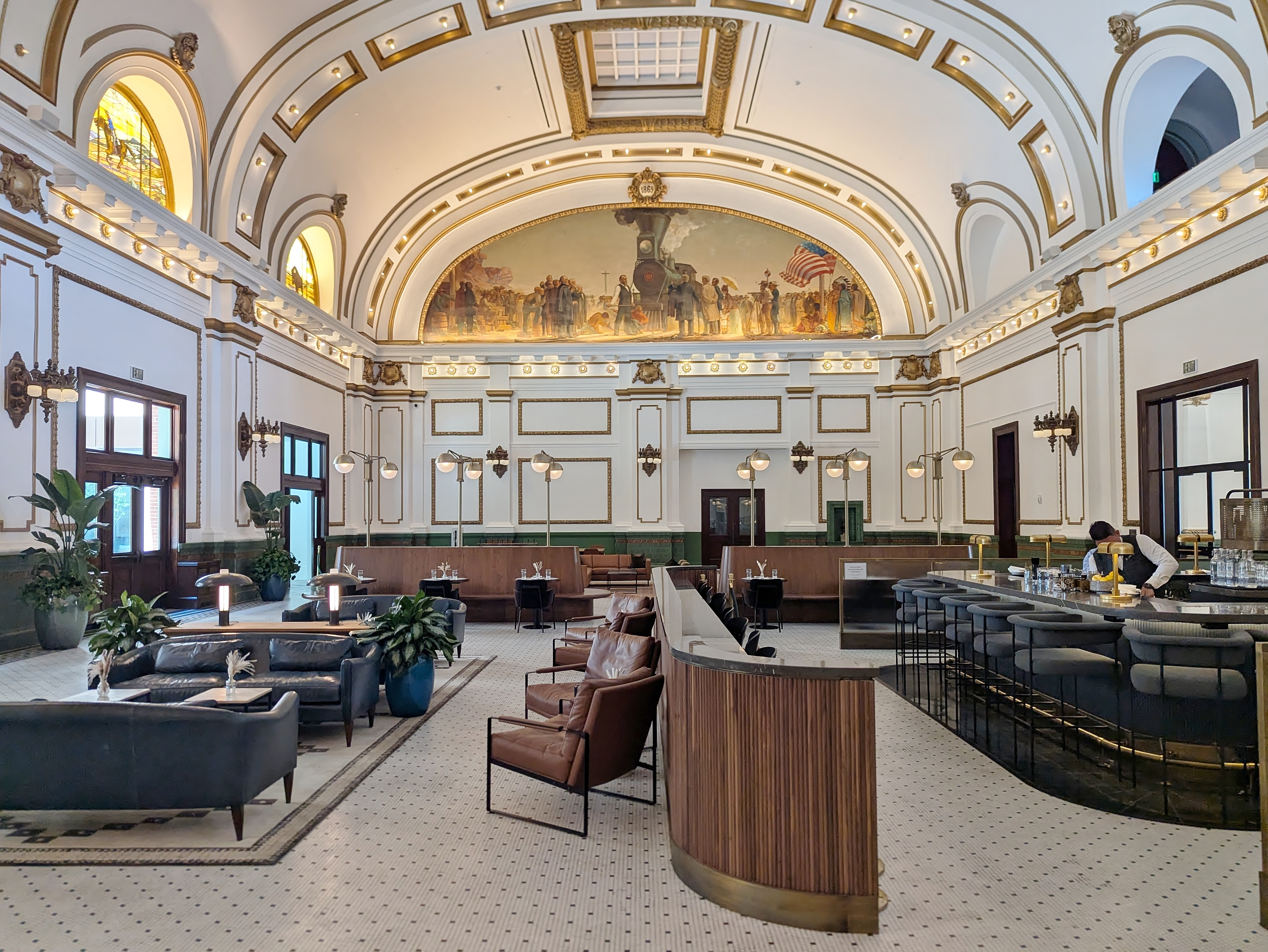
The interior of the Union Pacific Depot after its renovation into the lobby of the Asher Adams, Autograph Collection

The sandstone building is in French Second Empire style, and includes a terrazzo floor and stained glass windows. One ceiling mural "Driving The Golden Spike" by San Francisco artist John MacQuarrie in 1909, depicts the driving of the Golden Spike north of Salt Lake City at "Promontory Summit" signifying the completion of the first transcontinental railroad in 1869. Another mural, "Emigrants Entering Salt Lake Valley," by San Francisco artists John MacQuarrie & August C. Wocker in 1909, shows the 1847 arrival of Mormon pioneers to what is now Salt Lake City.

The building has a 136-by-100-foot (41 by 30 m) grand hall with a vaulted ceiling. Several side rooms were originally used for separate male and female waiting areas. The depot once housed an emergency hospital, lunch room, baggage rooms, and offices for both of the original railroads. Most of these features are gone now, but the building was extensively renovated in the 1970s to repair damage. Additionally, the original slate roof was replaced by copper plates due to leaking problems. After the building became part of the Asher Adams hotel, the southern end of the depot was converted to 13 suites. Two conference rooms, named after the Desert Wind and Pioneer trains that used to stop at the station, were also added. Old gates from the depot were reused in the Wye and Rouser restaurant.

== See also ==
- National Register of Historic Places in Salt Lake County, Utah
