= North Coast Limited =

Former named passenger train

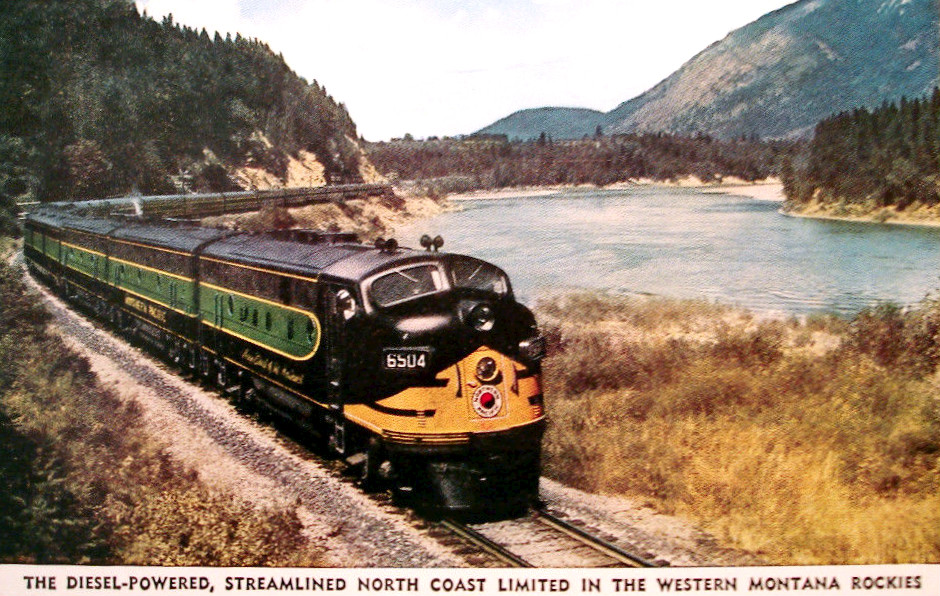
- The postwar diesel streamliner before the 1954 redesign

Overview
- First service: April 29, 1900
- Last service: April 30, 1971
- Successor: North Coast Hiawatha
- Former operator: Northern Pacific Railway

Route
- Termini: Chicago, Illinois; Seattle, Washington
- Distance travelled: 2,228 miles (3,586 km)
- Service frequency: daily
- Train number: 25, 26

The North Coast Limited was a named passenger train operated by the Northern Pacific Railway between Chicago and Seattle via Bismarck, North Dakota. It started on April 29, 1900, and continued as a Burlington Northern Railroad train after the merger on March 2, 1970 with Great Northern Railway and the Chicago, Burlington and Quincy Railroad. The next year, it ceased operations after the trains which left their originating stations on April 30, 1971, the day before Amtrak began service (May 1, 1971), arrived at their destinations.

After 1918 the Chicago to St. Paul leg of the route was on the Chicago, Burlington and Quincy railroad along its Mississippi River line through Wisconsin. The train had a Portland section which split off the Seattle section at Pasco, Washington and ran over NP subsidiary Spokane, Portland and Seattle Railway between Pasco and Portland.

For much of its history the North Coast Limited was known for its dining car service.

== History ==
=== Inauguration ===
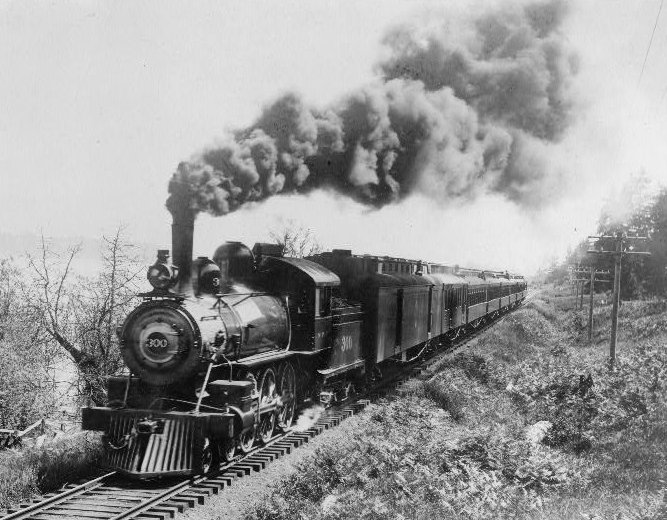
NP 300 (later renumbered 386), pulling the first North Coast Limited train on April 29, 1900, near Portland, Oregon. Photo by George M. Weister of the Angelus Studio.

Inaugurated on April 29, 1900, between St. Paul, Minnesota, and Puget Sound, the Northern Pacific's North Coast Limited was pulled by NP 300, one of the two 4-6-0 E-5 class locomotives built by the Schenectady Locomotive Works in 1893. The other locomotive was NP 301, later renumbered as 387.

The train started as a summer-only service but expanded to a year-round daily train in 1902. The North Coast Limited then ran as Number 1 westbound and Number 2 eastbound.

Until the rail line was completed to Vancouver, WA in 1908 and the swing Burlington Northern Railroad Bridge was constructed between Vancouver and Portland, the train was put on a specially constructed railroad ferry which crossed the Columbia River between Goble, Oregon and Kalama, Washington. The ferry, the Tacoma (originally christened Kalama), was built in Portland in 1883 out of 57,159 pieces which had been shipped from New York around Cape Horn on board the Tillie E. Starbuck (1883–1907), the first iron sailing vessel built in the United States.

=== Heavyweight ===
In 1909 the train received new heavyweight cars built by Pullman-Standard and added a Portland section which operated via the Spokane, Portland and Seattle Railway between Spokane, Washington and Portland, Oregon. The railroad began its through train service between Chicago and the Pacific Northwest on May 23, 1909, announcing it in newspaper ads.

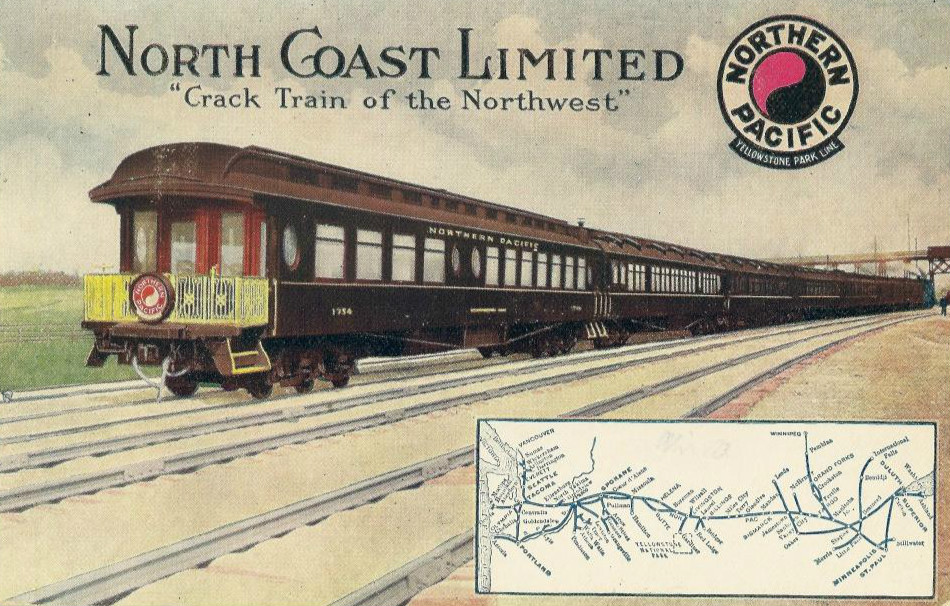
The train and route in 1911.

On December 17, 1911 service was extended to Chicago over the Chicago and North Western Railway. In 1918 the route east of St Paul became the Mississippi River line of the Chicago, Burlington and Quincy Railroad, which ran to Chicago's Union Station instead of Northwestern Station.

In summer 1926 the schedule for 2331 miles between Chicago and Seattle was 70 hr 25 min westward and 69 hr 55 min eastward. In June 1929 the fastest trains on NP, GN and the Milwaukee started running on a 63-hour westward schedule and 61-1/4 hours eastward, still with no extra fare.

During the 1920s, Northern Pacific's secondary train on the Chicago-Seattle route was called the Pacific Express westbound and Atlantic Express eastbound. In 1929, NP added a third train, called the Alaskan. At the same time, it made the North Coast Limited an all-Pullman train, including Pullman parlor cars for part of the route but no tourist sleepers or coaches. Due to the Depression, this didn't last long, and by 1931 the Pacific/Atlantic Express was off the timetable and tourist sleepers and coaches were back on the North Coast Limited.

On May 14, 1930 the North Coast Limited got new heavyweight steel cars. The new trains had brass windows, barber and valet services, a barber shop, separate bath and shower facilities for men and women, a soda fountain and radios on board. By 1937 most cars were air conditioned; in 1942 the lounge observation cars with open platforms were replaced by buffet solarium sleepers.

=== Streamlined ===
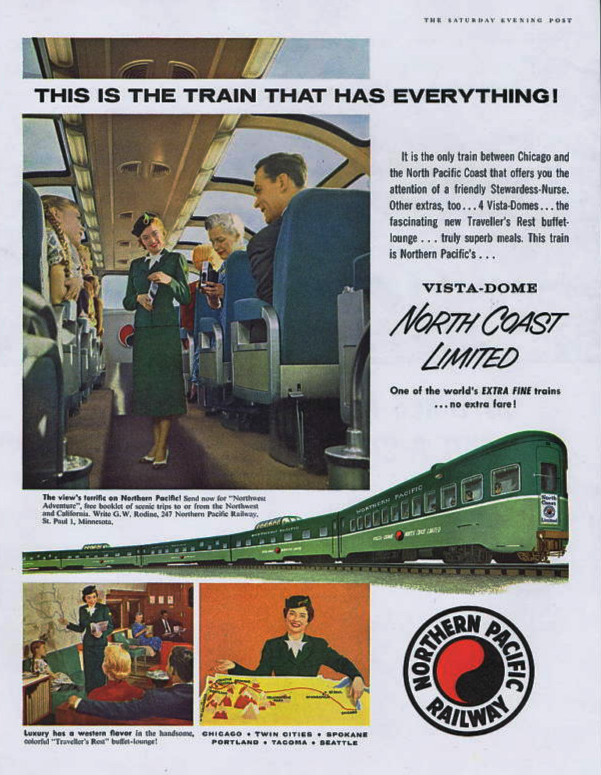
As the Vista-Dome North Coast Limited, with its onboard stewardess-nurse.

In 1946 the Northern Pacific board of directors authorized the purchase of new streamlined equipment for the railroad, beginning with the North Coast Limited. The new train began service in 1948. A stewardess-nurse would later be added in June of 1955.

In summer 1950 Train 1 left Chicago at 2300 CST and took 58 hr 30 min to Seattle; it was NP's only through train. In November 1952 it was speeded up to match the competition, leaving Chicago at 1130 and taking 46 hr 30 min to Seattle. The North Coast then became trains 25 and 26; numbers 1 and 2 were given to a secondary Chicago-Seattle train, the Mainstreeter, which took its name from the Northern Pacific advertising slogan "Main Street of the Northwest."

Until 1954 the North Coast was painted in the “Pine Tree” or "Streamline" scheme: grey roof, dark green letterboards, light green windowband and dark green lower sides with black trucks. The train's more famous two-tone green paint scheme which was added in 1954 and Lewis and Clark-themed interiors of the Traveller’s Rest Tavern car added in 1955 were designed by Raymond Loewy. The train now had a green roof, letterboards and windowband, a thin white line below the window band, and pale mint green lower sides with black trucks; most car names were replaced with numbers.

In 1954 the Northern Pacific introduced dome cars to the consist and advertised it as "the Vista-Dome North Coast Limited." There were two dome coaches and two dome sleepers (all built by Budd) in each train. The dome sleepers had four roomettes in the short end, four double bedrooms in the long end, and four single bedrooms underneath the dome. Each car had 24 unreserved seats in the dome upstairs. The Northern Pacific placed at least one flat-topped car between each dome car to give passengers the best view. In 1959 the Northern Pacific added the slumbercoach, for economy sleeping accommodations, to the train.

In 1967 the observation lounge cars were discontinued, but the sleeping car passengers could still enjoy lounge atmosphere in the dome sleepers, since below the dome two of the four single bedrooms were replaced with a buffet, and 24 lounge table seats were installed on the dome level, which allowed Northern Pacific to advertise the rebuilt dome sleepers as “Lounge in the Sky.”

The scenic route went west across northern Illinois on the Burlington to the Mississippi River at Savanna, Illinois and then followed the Mississippi through La Crosse, Wisconsin, St. Paul, and Minneapolis as far as Little Falls, Minnesota. North Dakota cities served included Fargo, Bismarck, and Dickinson. Crossing Montana, the train passed through Glendive, Billings, Livingston, Bozeman, Butte, and Missoula. After passing through Sandpoint, the train made stops at Spokane, Pasco, Yakima, and East Auburn (a stop for connecting service to Tacoma) before terminating at King Street Station in Seattle.

Declining ridership and continuing red ink led the train to be jointly operated with the Great Northern's Empire Builder between Chicago and Minneapolis. By late 1967 the combination was combined with the Chicago, Burlington and Quincy's Twin Cities Zephyrs between Chicago and Minneapolis. The eastbound North Coast Limited/Empire Builder was combined with the Morning Zephyr, while the westbound train combined with the Afternoon Zephyr.

The Burlington Northern Railroad resulted from the March 1970 merger of NP, GN, CB&Q, and the SP&S. The North Coast Limited ran combined with its former rival Empire Builder between Chicago and Minneapolis, between Spokane and Portland, and between Spokane and Seattle. The original train ceased operation with the Amtrak takeover. The last trains left their originating stations on April 30, 1971, seventy-one years and one day after the inaugural.

=== North Coast Hiawatha ===
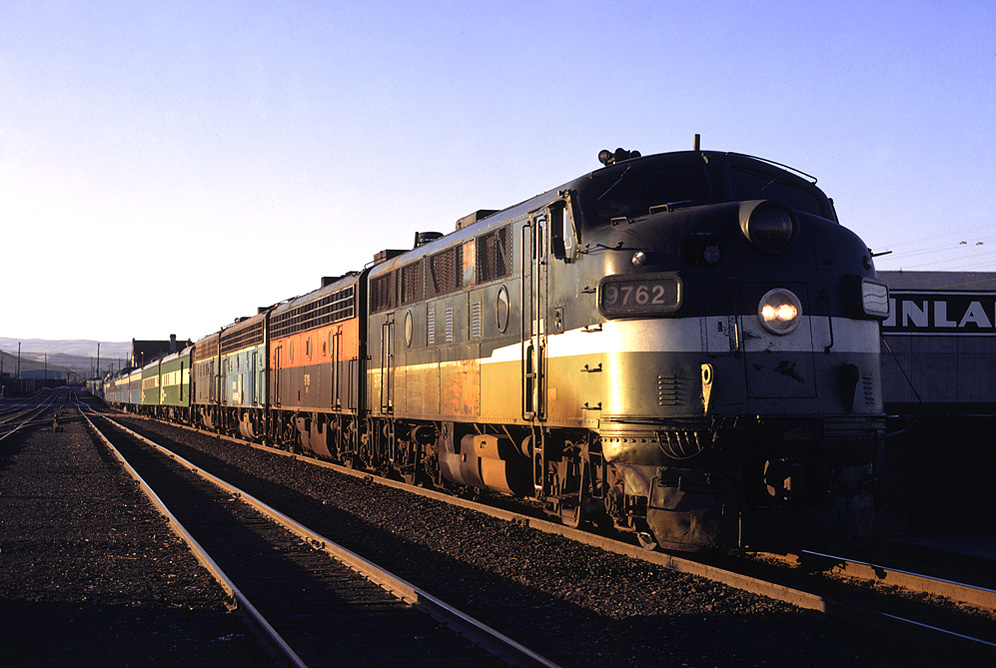
The North Coast Hiawatha at Yakima, Washington in August 1971.

On June 5, 1971 service was reinstated over much of the former North Coast Limited route by Amtrak as the North Coast Hiawatha. The train's name was an amalgam of North Coast Limited and Olympian Hiawatha, the Milwaukee Road's former Pacific Northwest train. The train was combined with the Amtrak Empire Builder between Chicago and Minneapolis and between Spokane and Seattle (at the time the Empire Builder used the former North Coast Limited route between Spokane and Seattle, via Yakima) and operated three days per week. On November 14, 1971, the North Coast Hiawatha began operating as a separate train from Chicago to Spokane (and daily between Chicago and Minneapolis on former Milwaukee Road trackage). It still combined with the Empire Builder between Spokane and Seattle. On June 11, 1973, the North Coast Hiawatha began operating as a separate train (still tri-weekly, except during some summer and holiday periods) all the way from Chicago to Seattle; the segment between Spokane and Seattle used was the former Empire Builder route via Cascade Tunnel. The North Coast Hiawatha was discontinued on October 1, 1979.

Much of the route today is not served by passenger trains, though Amtrak's Empire Builder does run on some of the same trackage in its St. Paul-Moorhead and Sandpoint-Pasco segments. Additionally, the route in Montana through Butte and over Homestake Pass has been inactive (intact, but without any trains) since 1983, as freight trains (now operated by BNSF) use the flatter and more direct route via Helena. The lone remaining Chicago to Seattle/Portland passenger train today is Amtrak's Empire Builder which primarily traverses much of the former Great Northern route west of St. Paul, Minnesota via Grand Forks and Minot, ND; Havre, Whitefish, and Glacier National Park in Montana; and Wenatchee and Everett in Washington State.

== Equipment ==
The original heavyweight North Coast Limited carried head-end cars, coaches, sleeping cars, a dining car, and an observation car. A distinguishing feature of the observation car was a library containing 140 volumes.

A Westbound Consist for NP Train 25, the NORTH COAST LIMITED, from the May 27, 1962 NP System Public Timetable

Applied for the main NP route from St. Paul, MN to Pasco, WA. The train split at Pasco, WA into Seattle, WA and Portland, OR sections)

1. Baggage (for Seattle)
2. Mail Dormitory (for Seattle)
3. Dome Coach Car 250 (for Seattle)
4. Coach Car 251 (for Seattle)
5. Coach Car 254 (for Seattle)
6. Coach Car 253 (for Portland)
7. Dome Coach Car 252 (for Portland)
8. “Lewis & Clark Traveller’s Rest” Buffet-lounge car (for Seattle)
9. Diner (for Seattle)
10. Dome Sleeper Car 256 4 Double Bedrooms, 4 Duplex Single Rooms, 4 Roomettes (rebuilt to Dome Lounge Sleepers “Lounge in the Sky” in 1967—car always for Seattle)
11. Sleeper Car 258 8 Duplex Roomettes, 6 Roomettes, 4 Double Bedrooms (for Seattle)
12. Sleeper Car 257 8 Duplex Roomettes, 6 Roomettes, 4 Double Bedrooms (for Portland)
13. Dome Sleeper Car 258 4 Double Bedrooms, 4 Duplex Single Rooms, 4 Roomettes (for Seattle)
14. Sleeper Lounge Observation Car 259 4 Double Bedrooms, 1 Compartment (for Seattle—discontinued after 1967)

At Pasco, the Portland cars were switched onto SP&S Train 1, which also carried through equipment from Spokane to Portland from the Great Northern Railway’s Empire Builder. SP&S Train 1 carried a diner and lounge-sleeper, as well as the NP and GN cars.

The balance of the train continued as NP Train 25 from Pasco, WA over Stampede Pass into Seattle King Street Station.
