= Mainstreeter =

Train between Chicago and the Pacific Northwest

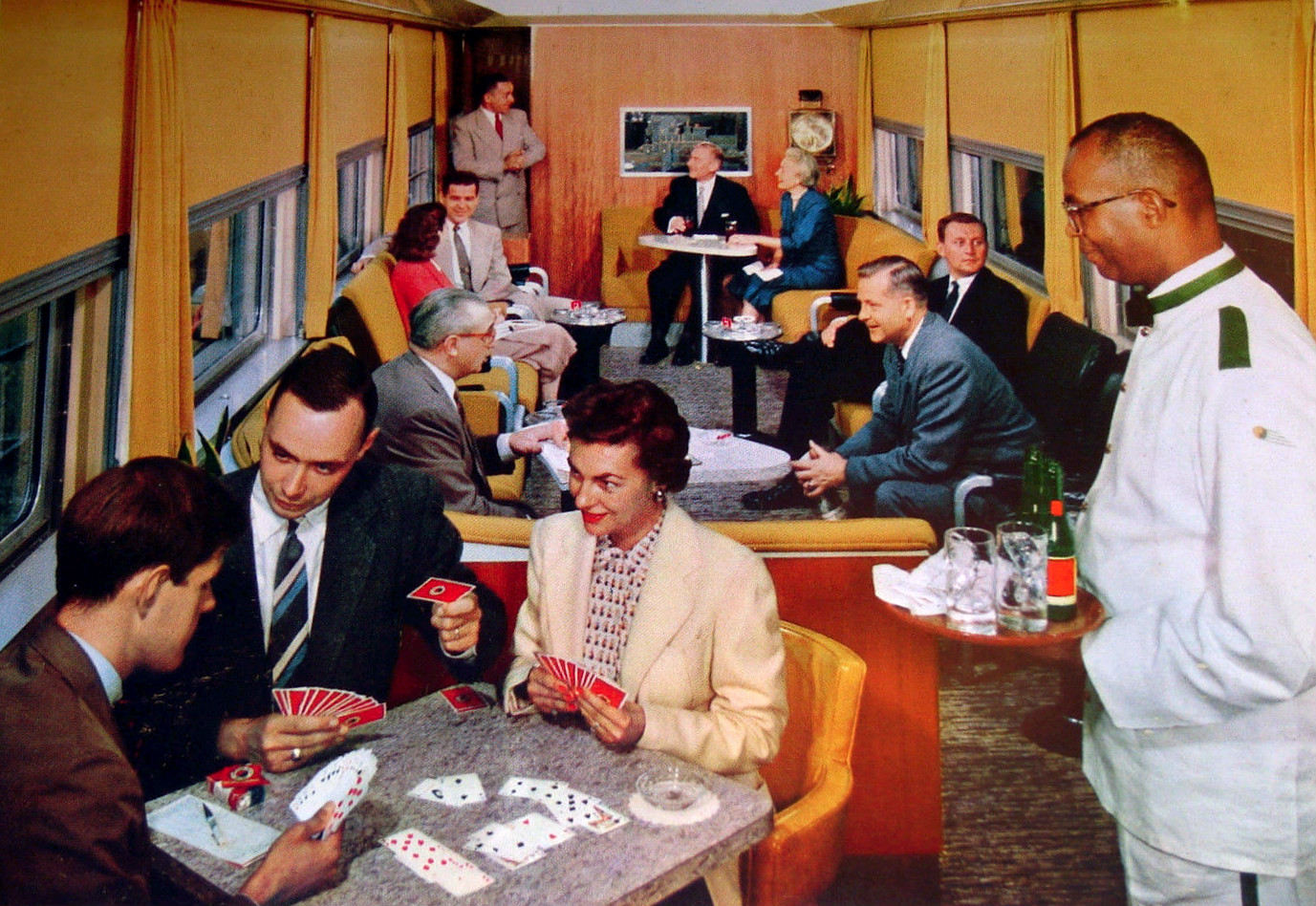
- The Holiday Lounge on the Mainstreeter.

Overview
- Service type: Inter-city rail
- Status: Discontinued
- Locale: Western United States
- Predecessor: Alaskan
- First service: November 15, 1952
- Last service: April 30, 1971
- Successor: North Coast Hiawatha
- Former operator: Northern Pacific Railway

Route
- Termini: Chicago, Illinois; Seattle, Washington
- Distance travelled: 2,228 miles (3,586 km)

On-board services
- Sleeping arrangements: Sleeping cars
- Baggage facilities: Baggage car

Technical
- Timetable number: 1, 2

The Mainstreeter was a passenger train on the Northern Pacific Railway between Chicago, Illinois, and the Pacific Northwest from 1952 to 1971. When the North Coast Limited got a faster schedule in November 1952 the Mainstreeter was introduced, running roughly on the North Coast's old schedule but via Helena, Montana. Unlike the North Coast the Mainstreeter was not a true streamliner as it carried both new lightweight and traditional heavyweight coaches. It replaced another train, the Alaskan. The name referred to the Northern Pacific's slogan, "Main Street of the Northwest." While Amtrak did not retain the train as part of its initial route structure, it created a new train named the North Coast Hiawatha several months afterwards. That train ran until 1979.

== Equipment ==
Unlike many other trains the Mainstreeter did not have specific sets of equipment built for it. Cars that were specific to included the so-called "Holiday Lounges," a set of five parlor-buffet lounges built by Pullman-Standard and delivered in July 1956. The Northern Pacific numbered these cars 487–491. The June 1960 Official Guide of the Railways listed the following for westbound #1:

- Holiday Lounge (St. Paul–Seattle)
- Sleeping car (Chicago–Seattle)
- Sleeping car (Chicago–Seattle)
- Sleeper-buffet-lounge (Spokane–Portland)
- Dining car (St. Paul–Pasco)
- Various coaches

The two sleeping cars had 8 duplex roomettes, 6 roomettes, 3 double bedrooms and a compartment. These were built by Pullman-Standard in 1948 for the North Coast Limited.
