= North Coast Hiawatha =

Former long-distance Amtrak train

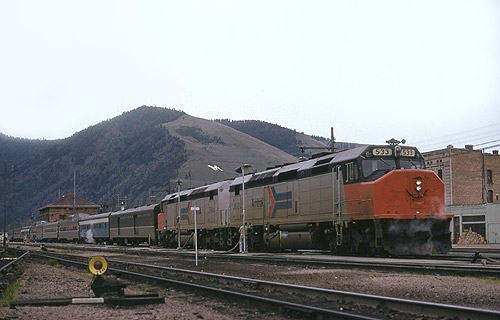
- The North Coast Hiawatha at Missoula, Montana, in 1974

Overview
- Service type: Inter-city rail
- Status: Discontinued
- Locale: Western United States
- Predecessor: North Coast Limited/Mainstreeter
- First service: June 5, 1971
- Last service: October 6, 1979
- Successor: None
- Former operator: Amtrak

Route
- Termini: Chicago, Illinois; Seattle, Washington
- Stops: 37
- Distance travelled: 2,228 miles (3,586 km)
- Average journey time: 46 hours, 40 minutes
- Service frequency: Tri-weekly
- Train number: 17/18

On-board services
- Sleeping arrangements: Sleeping cars
- Catering facilities: Full dining car On-board lounge
- Observation facilities: Dome lounge
- Baggage facilities: Baggage car

The North Coast Hiawatha was a long-distance passenger train operated by Amtrak between Chicago, Illinois, and Seattle, Washington, United States.

The train was a successor to the Northern Pacific Railway's North Coast Limited and Mainstreeter. Its name is a combination of North Coast Limited and Hiawatha, a Chicago, Milwaukee, St. Paul and Pacific Railroad (Milwaukee Road) train whose route it followed east of Minneapolis–St. Paul.

Created at the behest of Congress in 1971, the North Coast Hiawatha had an uncertain existence before being discontinued in 1979 amid a wave of Amtrak cuts. This left the Empire Builder as the lone train through Montana and North Dakota and severed some of these states' most populous cities from the rail network, including Missoula, Butte, Bozeman, Billings, and Bismarck.

Rail advocates have called for the return of the North Coast Hiawatha ever since its discontinuation. Efforts have accelerated in the 2020s with the formation of the Big Sky Passenger Rail Authority and the inclusion of the route in two Federal Railroad Administration route development programs.

== History ==
=== Background ===
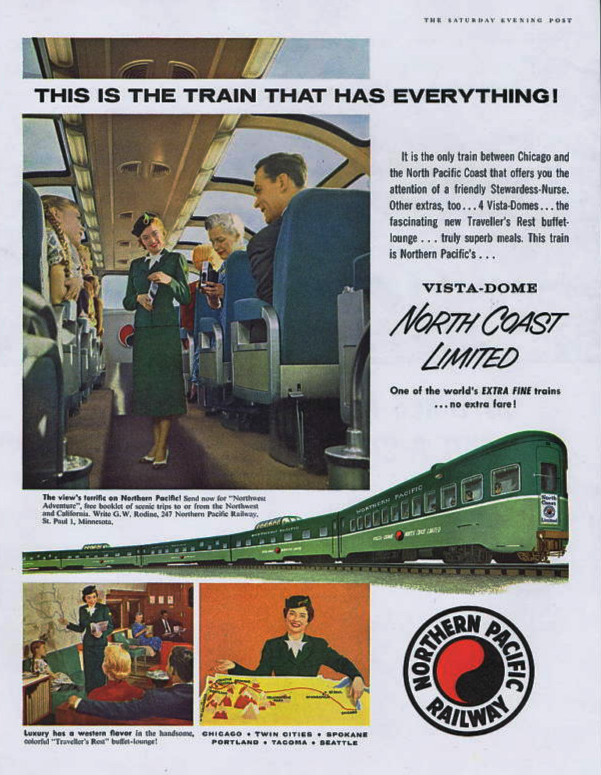
A 1956 advertisement in the Saturday Evening Post touted the predecessor North Coast Limited's amenities.

The flagship train on the Northern Pacific Railway (NP) main line was the North Coast Limited, which began in 1900. Its running mate since 1952 was the Mainstreeter, which operated on a slower schedule with fewer amenities. The NP main line mirrored that of its rival, the Great Northern Railway (GN), with the latter using a more northerly route through Montana and North Dakota.

The NP, GN, and Chicago, Burlington, and Quincy Railroad (CB&Q) shared closer relations starting in the 1920s and merged in 1970, forming the Burlington Northern Railroad. Passenger service continued over both the ex-NP and ex-GN after the merger. When passenger service transferred to Amtrak in 1971, they chose the Empire Builder—the former flagship train of the GN—for their Chicago–Pacific Northwest route. Amtrak based this decision on several factors, including the overall higher speed of the ex-GN route and better alternate transportation options along the ex-NP.

=== Operation ===
Amtrak's decision caused consternation in Montana. Mike Mansfield (D–Montana), then Senate Majority Leader, demanded that Amtrak find a way to serve Montana's larger cities that the Empire Builder bypassed by not using the ex-NP line, including Billings, Bozeman, Butte, and Missoula.

Amtrak reacted to the pressure and announced a resumption of service over the ex-NP line effective June 14, 1971, creating an unnamed section of the Empire Builder that ran three days a week over the ex-NP route between Minneapolis and Spokane. Mansfield's intervention earned the train the nickname "Mike Mansfield Limited". The NP route, which included the Yellowstone River, Homestake Pass and Bitterroot Mountains, was praised for its scenery, and Amtrak considered it one of its six most beautiful. The train also provided a convenient connection to Yellowstone National Park at Livingston, Montana.

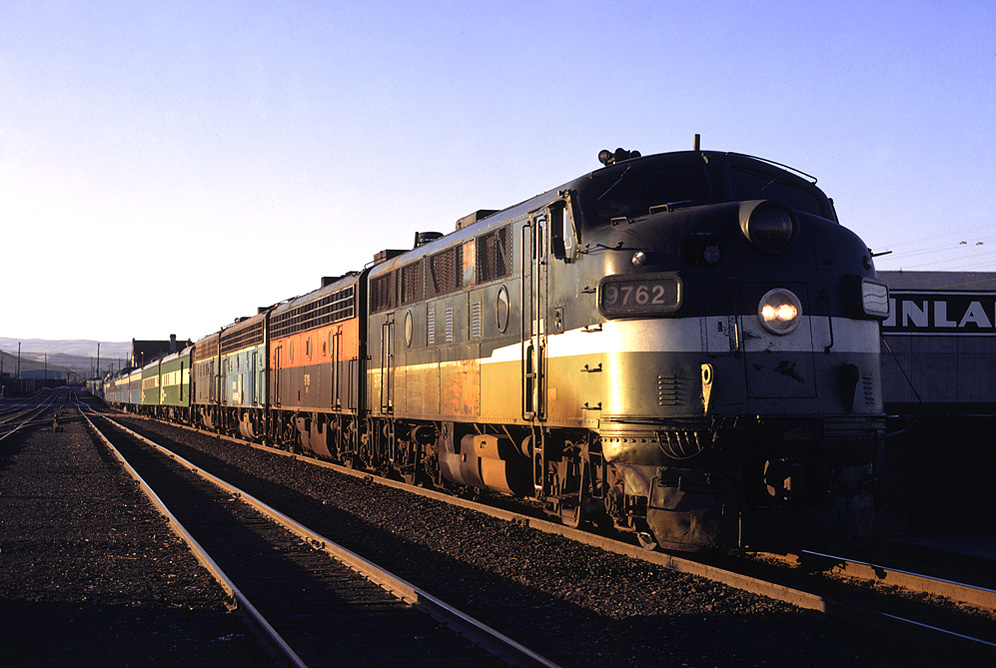
The North Coast Hiawatha at Yakima, Washington in August 1971.

On November 14, 1971, Amtrak formally named this service the North Coast Hiawatha and extended it to Chicago. It retained its tri-weekly schedule and joint operation with the Empire Builder west of Spokane. On the four days of the week that the North Coast Hiawatha did not run, its route between Chicago and Minneapolis was served by a train on the same schedule. This Chicago–Minneapolis train was initially named Hiawatha, then Twin Cities Hiawatha (starting January 16, 1972), and, finally, Hiawatha again (starting October 29, 1972). This name remained until the North Coast Hiawatha went daily on May 19, 1974.

The joint operation with the Empire Builder ended on June 11, 1973, when Amtrak extended the North Coast Hiawatha to Seattle using the GN's route via Stevens Pass and the Cascade Tunnel, which included stops at the northern Washington cities of Wenatchee and Everett. The train remained on a tri-weekly schedule west of Minneapolis. For the summer of 1974, Amtrak added a second train, the Expo '74 (named for Expo '74 being held in Spokane), to the Seattle–Spokane segment.

The train operated daily between Chicago and Seattle during the summers of 1974 and 1977, and during certain holiday seasons, such as December 12, 1975 – January 12, 1976. Otherwise, it remained tri-weekly west of Minneapolis.

In early 1976, the North Coast Hiawatha was threatened with discontinuance, along with the Pacific International and the three daily Portland–Seattle trains, after the Ford Administration proposed budget cuts. Several members of Congress protested the proposed cuts, including Representative Max Baucus (D–Montana), and Senators Warren Magnuson (D–Washington) and Bob Packwood (R–Oregon). Congress eventually approved a budget for Amtrak $62 million above the administration's request, saving all three services.

In October 1976, Amtrak announced that the North Coast Hiawatha would be the second train (after the Empire Builder) to receive the new bi-level Superliner coaches, then on order from Pullman Standard. The train was ultimately cancelled before the Superliners entered long-distance service.

In May 1977, Amtrak added seven hours to the schedule, increasing it to 52 hours 30 minutes. The change was caused by speed restrictions on Amtrak's new EMD SDP40F diesel locomotives after they suffered a rash of derailments.

In September 1977, Amtrak brought back the Twin Cities Hiawatha name for the train's four-day-per-week Chicago–Minneapolis service.

In November, Amtrak reduced the running time to 46 hours 40 minutes, after the replacement of the SDP40Fs permitted an easing of speed restrictions. Even as this improved service began, the train was threatened with cancellation. Facing a budget deficit of $60 million, Amtrak identified a half dozen routes that it considered financially troubled. Amtrak proposed merging the North Coast Hiawatha and the Empire Builder, or even cancelling both. Throughout 1978, no decision was taken, and both trains continued to provide daily service between Chicago and Seattle.

=== Discontinuance ===
It would be cheaper to buy every Chicago-Seattle rail passenger a free $170 plane ticket and two drinks than it is to operate the Hiawatha.

— US Secretary of Transportation Brock Adams, 1979

In January 1979, Secretary of Transportation Brock Adams announced plans to cut 12,000 miles (19,000 km) from Amtrak's network. The North Coast Hiawatha was one of many routes scheduled for elimination. The train had faced cancellation before, but after eight years of federal subsidies, members of Congress favored retrenchment. Once-vocal supporters such as Senator Magnuson expressed regret but made no public commitment. Adams noted that the service recovered only $6 million against expenses of $24 million, and that the per-passenger cost was $178.

In July an attempt by Representative (and future Vice President) Al Gore (D–Tennessee) to impose a one-year moratorium on the proposed system-wide cuts failed 214–197. In the end the Senate approved a smaller cutback, citing a 24% spike in Amtrak ridership after an oil shock during the summer, but the North Coast Hiawatha remained on the chopping block. In late September, the Railway Labor Executives' Association, along with Senator John Melcher (D–Montana) and Representative Pat Williams (D–Montana), sued the U.S. Department of Transportation to prevent the discontinuance of the service, then scheduled for October 1. A federal judge temporarily restrained Amtrak from ending the service, but the last North Coast Hiawathas ran on October 6, 1979, arriving in Chicago on the 7th and Seattle on the 8th.

=== Proposed return ===
The end of the North Coast Hiawatha severed much of the populated portion of Montana from the national rail network, and also spelled the end of intercity rail service in southern North Dakota. Over the years there have been periodic attempts to restore service in these areas. A plan in 1982–83 proposed North Dakota and Montana paying 45% of costs in the first year and 65% thereafter for a new section of the Empire Builder operating tri-weekly between Fargo and Sandpoint. This proposal went nowhere when neither state approved the needed subsidy. Another proposal in 1991 would have required an additional yearly federal appropriation of $12–15 million plus new equipment. In this scenario, the Portland section would operate over the old route. Again, nothing came of it.

In 2008, Congress directed Amtrak to study resumption of service, which rekindled hope of restoration. Amtrak published a feasibility study in October 2009, which proposed restoring the North Coast Hiawatha to its 1979 route where, possible with a daily schedule, Amtrak projected a yearly ridership of 359,800, some of whom would be drawn from the Empire Builder. Amtrak estimated that $1 billion in funds would be necessary to relaunch the service, including over $300 million for new locomotives and rolling stock. The corporation estimated it would take four to five years to reintroduce the service if a decision was made to move forward.

==== Efforts in the 2020s ====
In 2020, local rail advocates started an informal Greater Northwest Passenger Rail Working Group focused on restarting the North Coast Hiawatha, Pioneer, and other routes in the Northwestern United States. This approach is modeled on the Gulf Coast Working Group and Southern Rail Commission, which helped restore Amtrak service between New Orleans and Mobile.

In December 2020, twelve Montana counties formed the Big Sky Passenger Rail Authority (BSPRA), the first entity to have railway authority powers under Montana state law. The BSPRA's focus is restoring passenger rail in southern Montana along the former route of the North Coast Hiawatha. The authority held its first annual conference in August 2021. As of August 2022, the number of member counties participating in the BSPRA has grown to eighteen, covering the great majority of the proposed route. Amtrak, BNSF Railway, the Montana Department of Transportation, and three federally recognized tribes are ex officio members. Amtrak is the presumed operator of the service, while BNSF would host the train on its southern Montana line once it takes control back from Montana Rail Link in 2022.

In September 2021, the Rail Passengers Association assessed restoration of the full North Coast Hiawatha as proposed by the Big Sky Passenger Rail Authority. On an annual basis, they forecast ridership of 426,000, economic benefit of $270.6 million, operating cost of $68 million, revenue of $41 million, and a vehicle-miles traveled reduction of 45.9 million.

In June 2021, Senator Jon Tester (D-Montana) added an amendment to the Surface Transportation Investment Act of 2021 which requires the Department of Transportation (not Amtrak itself) to evaluate the restoration of discontinued long-distance routes including the North Coast Hiawatha. The bill passed the Senate Commerce Committee with bipartisan support, and was later rolled into the Infrastructure Investment and Jobs Act (IIJA), which was passed into law in November 2021. The report must be delivered to Congress within two years. The law also provides $2.4 billion in new funds to Amtrak's long-distance route network.

In May 2022, the Federal Railroad Administration established the Corridor Identification and Development Program as the mechanism to award grants for new train service under the IIJA. In October of that year, the North Dakota Department of Transportation submitted a note to the FRA supporting restoration of the North Coast Hiawatha route through Fargo, Bismarck, and Dickinson, North Dakota. In March 2023, the Big Sky Passenger Rail Authority formally submitted the route to the Corridor ID Program. The route was accepted into the program in December, granting $500,000 toward development and prioritizing the project for future federal funds.

On October 28, 2022, the FRA announced the beginning of the Amtrak Daily Long-Distance Service Study as required by the IIJA. Its purpose is to evaluate the restoration and addition of discontinued and new long-distance passenger services, as well as the upgrading of tri-weekly long-distance services (the Sunset Limited and the Cardinal) to daily operation. The criteria for either restoring or creating new long-distance routes are that they connect large and small communities as part of a "regional rail network", provide economic and social well-being for rural areas, provide "enhanced connectivity" for the existing long-distance passenger trains, and reflect the support and engagement of the locals and region for restored long-distance passenger service. These criteria include the North Coast Hiawatha, among other trains. The study will take place through 2023, and will engage with stakeholders, the rail companies, and communities as it "evaluates how to better connect people with long-distance rail services".

== Equipment ==
The North Coast Hiawatha saw a variety of motive power and rolling stock during its eight years, as Amtrak disposed of its inherited equipment as best it could and gradually replaced the older equipment with its own stock. In the early 1970s a typical train might feature as many as four dome cars pulled by EMD E9s (formerly of Milwaukee Road). In the summer of 1972 the train maxed out at 18 cars, including five dome coaches, an ex-California Zephyr dome lounge, and a dome-sleeper-lounge. The 1970 Burlington/Great Northern merger notwithstanding, cars carried both the "Big Sky Blue" livery characteristic of late Great Northern passenger trains and the "Cascade Green" of the Burlington Northern Railroad.

The train was one of many routes to receive the new EMD SDP40F, which worked the route between 1974 and 1977, although older EMD E8 and EMD E9s continued to be used. A series of derailments involving the SDP40F prompted their replacement, and by late 1977 Amtrak had introduced the EMD F40PH. These sometimes ran with an E9 "B" unit as well. In late 1976 a typical North Coast Hiawatha departed Seattle with two SDP40Fs, a baggage car, two 44-seat long-distance coaches, a Budd dome coach, one of the dormitory-coffee shop cars formerly used on California Zephyr, an ex-North Coast Limited dining car, and a single Pacific series sleeping car. Two more baggage cars were added at Minneapolis for mail and express service.

== See also ==
- Pioneer
- Desert Wind
