= The Hiawatha Story =

Book about Milwaukee Road's most famous passenger trains

- The original 1970 cover, featuring the watercolor "Roaring Through Rondout" by Gil Reid
- Author: Jim Scribbins
- Cover artist: Gil Reid
- Language: English
- Published: 1970 (Kalmbach Publishing); 2007 (University of Minnesota Press)
- Publication place: United States
- Pages: 267
- OCLC: 91468

The Hiawatha Story is a 1970 non-fiction book on railroad history by Jim Scribbins, then an employee of the Chicago, Milwaukee, St. Paul and Pacific Railroad (the "Milwaukee Road"). The book covers the history of the Milwaukee Road's most famous passenger train, the Hiawatha, from its creation in 1934–1935 up through 1970. The book also covered the various other Milwaukee Road trains which carried the name "Hiawatha."

== Synopsis ==
The Hiawatha Story is organized chronologically. It begins with the construction of the first Hiawatha in 1934–1935. The Milwaukee Road created the train to compete with streamliners then under development by the Chicago, Burlington and Quincy Railroad's (Burlington Route) and Chicago and North Western Railway. Unusually for the period, the Milwaukee Road constructed all the passenger equipment in its own shops, and Scribbins devotes considerable space to describing this equipment in detail, with many illustrative photographs. Scribbins also describes the work done to prepare the Chicago–Twin Cities route for high-speed running. The Hiawatha regularly operated at speeds over 100 miles per hour (160 km/h).

Scribbins follows the history of the original Hiawatha, later re-branded as the Twin Cities Hiawatha, which at the time the book was published in 1970 was still in operation. The popularity of the train led the Milwaukee Road to apply the "Hiawatha" brand to other routes, and Scribbins tells the history of these as well: Chippewa-Hiawatha, Midwest Hiawatha, North Woods Hiawatha and Olympian Hiawatha. Throughout, Scribbins pays close attention to the operation details as well as the rolling stock. Famous Milwaukee Road products such as the Beaver Tail and Skytop Lounge are described in detail, as are the Pullman-Standard Super Domes, the first full-length dome cars ever built, which operated on several "Hiawatha" routes.

== Reception ==
The Hiawatha Story received favorable reviews on its publication. Richard C. Overton reviewed the book for Technology and Culture and called it "worthy of some attention by the serious student of American railroading." Overton wrote that while Scribbins had included much railfan-pleasing technical detail the book "should appeal to a wide audience." Martin Baker, writing in RQ, called the book an "exceptionally thorough and attractive account." George W. Hilton praised the book in a review for Railway and Locomotive Historical Society Bulletin: "The book clearly conveys the impression of an effort to perfect it for its own sake that is the mark of the best scholarship of any sort." At its annual meeting in 1971 the Wisconsin Historical Society presented an "Award of Merit" to Scribbins for The Hiawatha Story.

== Publication ==
The Hiawatha Story was first published by Kalmbach Publishing in 1970. The dust jacket featured a watercolor by Gil Reid, art director at Kalmbach, called "Roaring Through Rondout", depicting a Milwaukee Road class A passing through Rondout, Illinois, at speed. In 2007 the University of Minnesota Press published a reprint of The Hiawatha Story as part of its Fesler-Lampert Minnesota Heritage series. In place of Reid's watercolor is a nighttime photograph of a Skytop Lounge.
