= Chippewa-Hiawatha =

Chippewa Chippewa-Hiawatha
Overview
- First service: May 28, 1937
- Last service: February 2, 1960
- Former operator: Milwaukee Road

Route
- Termini: Chicago, Illinois; Ontonagon, Michigan
- Distance travelled: 315 miles (507 km)
- Service frequency: Daily

The Chippewa consisting of mostly conventional components, and later known as the Chippewa-Hiawatha, with a streamlined consist was a passenger train operated by the Chicago, Milwaukee, St. Paul and Pacific Railroad ("Milwaukee Road") between Chicago, Illinois and Michigan's Upper Peninsula. It operated from 1937 to 1960. The Chippewa-Hiawatha was one of several regional trains to carry the "Hiawatha" brand.

== History ==
The Milwaukee Road introduced the Chippewa on May 28, 1937, after an inspection tour of the new rolling stock for residents along the route. The new train featured streamlined coach equipment and a 6-hour running time, two hours faster than previous services. Its original northern terminus was Iron Mountain, Michigan, 291 miles (468 km) north of Chicago in Michigan's Upper Peninsula. The trains operated daily, carrying number 21 northbound and 14 southbound. The northern terminus was extended twice: first to Channing on October 18, 1937 and then finally in March 13, 1938 to Ontonagon, on the southern shore of Lake Superior.

In the fall of 1948 the Milwaukee Road re-branded the train Chippewa-Hiawatha and upgraded its equipment, including Beaver Tail parlor cars. Dieselization followed in 1950. After that the train was downgraded as the Milwaukee Road's passenger service contracted. Service north of Channing was deemed unprofitable and ended on December 29, 1953. Parlor service ended north of Milwaukee in 1956. In April 1957 the train's name reverted to the Chippewa. Despite public support for the service, the Milwaukee Road discontinued the train altogether on February 2, 1960.

== Equipment ==
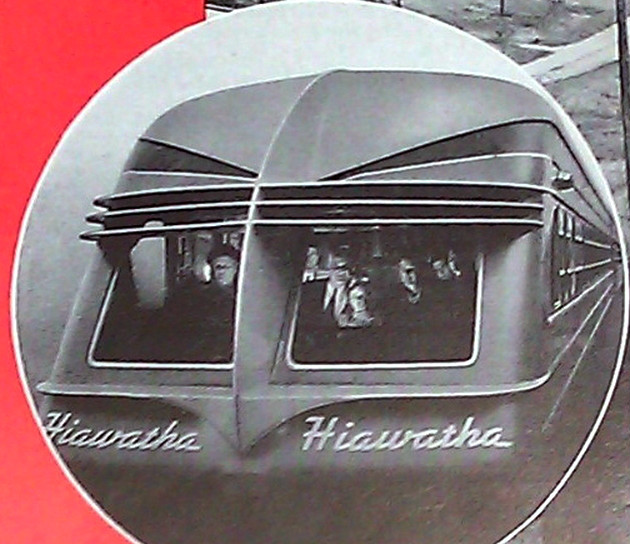
An advertisement depicts a third-generation Beaver Tail car on the rear of the Midwest Hiawatha in the 1940s. The Chippewa received these cars in 1948.

Much of the Chippewa's equipment came second-hand from its more famous cousin. The original Chippewa operated with two coaches, a railway post office (RPO), dining car, and parlor car. As part of a reshuffling of equipment on the Milwaukee Road in late 1948 the Chippewa received the "Beaver Tail" parlors made famous by the original Hiawatha. Motive power was provided by Class A 4-4-2 steam locomotives between Chicago and Milwaukee, and by the Class F3 Pacifics north. Dieselization came in 1950 with Erie-builts from Fairbanks-Morse. Later diesels included EMD E7s, EMD FP7s, and finally EMD GP9s. The train received newer equipment in 1948, including third-generation Beaver Tail parlors. These cars were removed in 1951 along with the full dining car.

Between 1950 and 1952 a Doodlebug replaced conventional equipment between Channing and Ontonagon.
