= Otto Kuhler =

American designer (1894–1977)

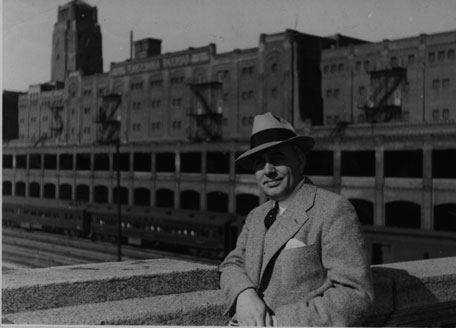
- Otto Kuhler at Chicago Union Station in 1935
- Born: July 31, 1894; Remscheid, German Empire
- Died: August 5, 1977 (aged 83); Denver, Colorado, U.S.
- Occupation: Industrial designer
- Spouse: Simonne Gillot Kuhler (m. 1936)
- Children: Winona; Renaldo

Otto August Kuhler (July 31, 1894 – August 5, 1977) was an American designer, one of the best known industrial designers of the American railroads. According to Trains magazine he streamstyled more locomotives and railroad cars than Cret, Dreyfuss and Loewy combined. His extensive concepts for the modernization of the American railroads have repercussions onto the railways worldwide until today. In addition he was a prolific artist of industrial aesthetics and of the American West in general.

Kuhler (pronounced "Cooler") became a US citizen in 1928. Eight years before he had married Simonne Gillot, daughter of a Belgian doctor. They had one daughter, Winona (married name: Zabriskie), and one son, Renaldo, who became known as a natural-history museum artist.

== Early life ==
Kuhler was born in Remscheid near Essen, Germany the only child in an anvil casters' family. He was determined to study electrical engineering, but returning from an early school exchange with Belgium he showed a conspicuous drawing talent. At age 19 he was commissioned to illustrate a catalog of steam locomobiles. He served in the German Army during World War I, was suspended because of an automobile accident, but called up again to command a logging railway troop in Belgium, where he met his future wife.

== Early work ==
His automobile body design sent in to Kathe & Soehne for a Mercedes chassis won a gold medal in 1913. Employed as a stylist with N.A.G. Berlin he designed movie sets for William Wauer's silent film "The Tunnel." He became associate editor of "Der Motor" magazine, and then styled car bodies for Snutsel Père&Fils (Brussels) and European automobile producers. Influenced by the art of Pennell he learned etching after World War I and enrolled at the Academy of Art in Düsseldorf. After emigration to the US in 1923 he worked as a commercial artist in Pittsburgh, Pennsylvania. His works centered on industrial landscapes, steel works and locomotives.

== Brill Company ==
Kuhler opened a Manhattan studio in 1928 and using the media promoted streamstyling of the antiquated railroads for more passenger appeal, only to be quashed by Wall Street crash of 1929. Three years later he got an assignment at J. G. Brill and Company for Union Pacific Railroad's competition leading to the streamliner M-10000 and won by Pullman. For Brill he also styled their PCC trolley prototype for Chicago and later the "Rebel" power cars for Gulf, Mobile and Northern Railroad. Parent company American Car & Foundry used Kuhler to style its growing line of motorrailers throughout the 1930s culminating in the double-ended rail motor cars for the New York, Susquehanna and Western Railway in 1940 and for Boston's Metropolitan Transit Authority in 1946.

== American Locomotive ==
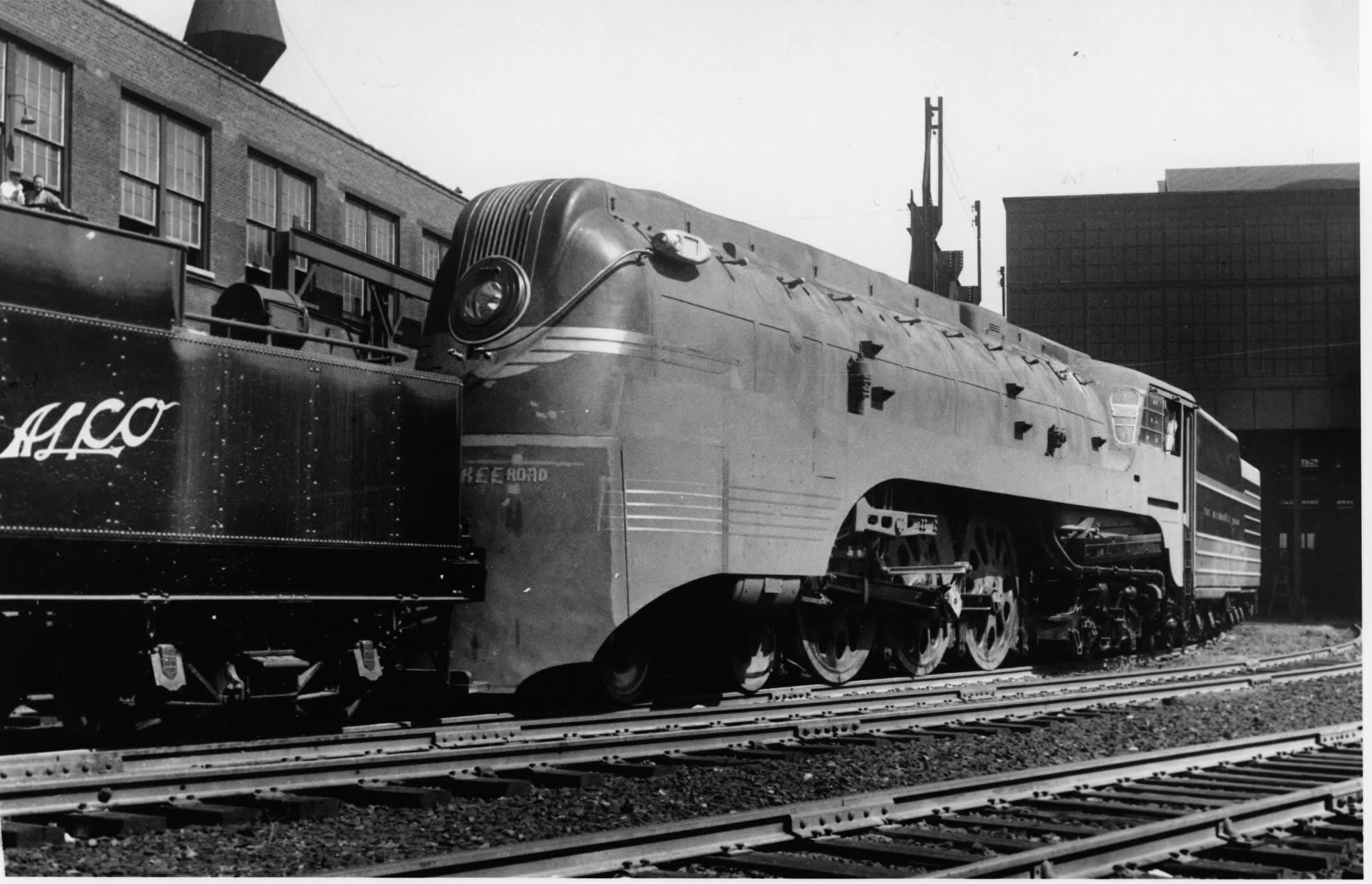
ALCO 4-6-4 class F7 steam locomotive streamstyled by Otto Kuhler for Milwaukee Road's Hiawatha trains

The American Locomotive Company (ALCO) assigned Kuhler to its advertising department in 1931 and commissioned him as a design consultant the following year. His first task was restyling the exterior trim of ALCO's Diesel switcher HH600 that persisted through all following variants. The next task established Kuhler's worldwide fame. The Milwaukee Road wanted a high-speed train for the competitive route between Chicago and Minneapolis. The cars were built in the company's shops, and the four A class locomotives were built by ALCO. Kuhler embellished their inverted bathtub look by a carefully colored livery. These Hiawatha trains became the fastest passenger service in the world by 1935. He had also designed the cars' interior, including the napkins and draperies in the dining car. His finned Beaver Tail observation car of the next generation was sensational, as were again the streamlined second-generation Milwaukee Road class F7 4-6-4 passenger locomotives designed by Kuhler. He also designed the ALCO DL-109, the predecessor of world-famous ALCO PA diesel locomotives, as well as the Southern Railway (U.S.) PS-4 class number 1380's streamlined appearance for The Tennessean in 1941, thus making it the Southern's only streamlined steam engine.

== Baltimore & Ohio ==
B&O logo by Otto Kuhler

As art director of the B&O magazine Kuhler was instrumental in developing the blue and gray color scheme and the modernized herald of B&O. When B&O turned to streamlining its Washington-New York run Kuhler could finally establish his "bullet nose" design on a steam locomotive that became known as "Kuhler type". The "Kuhler type" locomotive pulled the famous Royal Blue train (as an ultimate compliment Raymond Loewy later used a bullet nose on the giant engine S-1 for the New-York World Fair). Since the B&O run ended in Jersey City passengers were transferred to Manhattan by White Motor Co. buses that were styled by Kuhler, and provided with air conditioning using ice. Kuhler's three-man office (assistants James Henderson Barr and Henry A. Nau) continued to streamstyle steam locomotives of ALCO clients with one exception: New Haven's I-5 Class 4-6-4 locomotives built by Baldwin Locomotive Works in 1937. For the Lehigh Valley Railroad he streamstyled engine plus cars of the John Wilkes and related trains – arguably the most interesting Kuhler locomotive. As a consultant to the railroads' architectural departments Kuhler helped modernizing nine stations, including Des Moines, Iowa, of Chicago, Rock Island and Pacific Railroad and Milwaukee, Wisconsin, of the Milwaukee Road.

== American Car & Foundry ==
The onset of World War II meant a suspension to improvements in passenger comfort. Kuhler styled the diesel locomotive DL-109 by ALCO, and the New Haven Railroad was allowed by the War Production Board to order 60 more. Now limitation on railway design and Kuhler's German accent proved to be a disadvantage a sure sign being that he never got paid for his last streamstyling job of a steam locomotive for Southern Railway – in his own judgment his best design. Finally Kuhler had to abandon free-lancing and to enter a position at American Car & Foundry (ACF) in 1944 where he developed double-deck sleepers, subway cars with standee windows and more. Most of his patents were applied for while at ACF. In 1947 he was given his termination notice in one of the many reshuffles at ACF.

== Farming and painting ==
The Kuhlers sold their home with studio on a hill near Blauvelt, New York, and bought a 460-acre ranch (the KZ Ranch) straddling Deer Creek near Bailey, Colorado. Cattle raising and painting the West were now on Kuhler's agenda, the fruits of which can be seen in many American museums. Kuhler found beauty in industrial scenes, ranging from mines and factories to railroads, and he painted them with intricate attention to detail and accuracy. The Kuhler's farmhouse burned down and was rebuilt by them. At age 75 he sold the farm and moved with Simonne to Santa Fe, New Mexico, in 1969 to continue painting. Eight years later they moved back to Denver, Colorado, where Kuhler died at age 83. Currently, some of his work can be seen at the Colorado Railroad Museum in Golden, CO. Other Kuhler paintings are owned by the New Mexico Museum of Art, Brooklyn Museum, University of Missouri at St. Louis, Henry Ford Museum, Westmoreland Museum of American Art, Denver Public Library in Denver, Colorado, Fine Arts Museums of San Francisco, and the Roentgen Museum in Remscheid, Germany. The Denver Public Library collection includes 12 Kuhler oils donated by his wife that depict mining and railroad scenes in Colorado.

== Kuhler designs ==
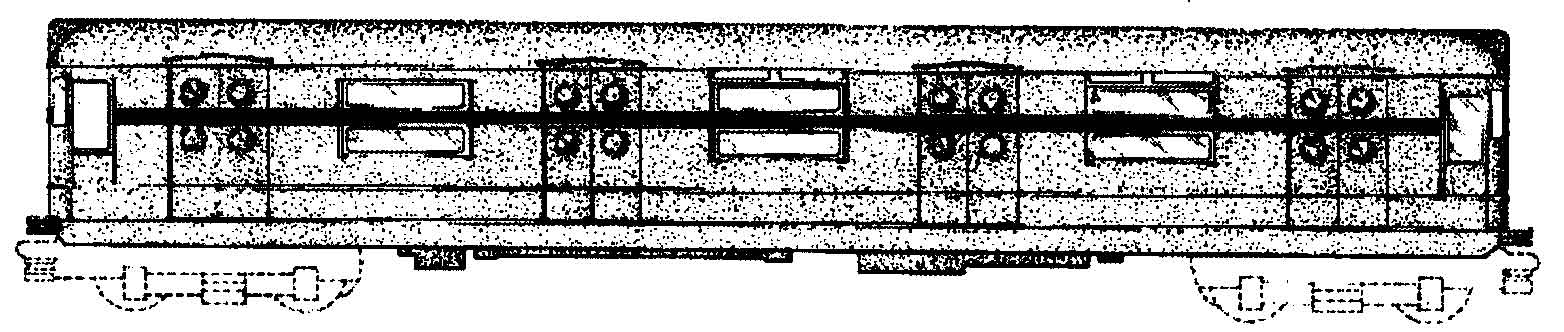
Kuhler's patent of subway car filed 1947 (copied by NYC R11)

- Automobile bodies for Kathe&Soehne, Austro-Daimler, N.A.G., Snutsel, Delage, Fiat, and Hansa 1913–18
- Streamline concept published for conventional J-1 steam loco of New York Central 1928
- ALCO HH600 diesel switcher (shape kept with following switcher generations like S-1) 1934
- ACF/ALCO non-articulated power cars The Rebel for Gulf, Mobile and Northern Railroad 1934 plus more ACF motorailers
- J. G. Brill prototype 7001 of PCC streetcar for Chicago 1935
- ALCO Milwaukee Road class A streamlined steam locos plus Hiawatha trains of Milwaukee Road 1935
- Remington Combined Automatic Typewriter and Stand 1936, US patent D103,459
- Color-scheme for Mountaineer Limited of New York, Ontario and Western Railway 1937
- Color-scheme, logo and streamstyled loco P-7 #5304 plus train for B&O's Royal Blue and more 1937
- White Motor Co. buses for passenger transfer of B&O
- exterior trim and interior design of subway cars (Pittsburgh Pressed Steel Car Company) for City of Philadelphia
- Baldwin I-5 class steam locos for Shoreliner of New York, New Haven and Hartford Railroad 1937
- ALCO Milwaukee Road class F7 steam locos and Hiawatha trains of Milwaukee Road 1938 with finned observation car
- Redecoration of doodlebug 17 (Osgood-Bradley) for Lehigh Valley Railroad 1938
- Exterior trim and interior design of train Asa Packer for Lehigh Valley 1938
- Streamstyled steam locos K-5 plus train John Wilkes and Black Diamond for Lehigh Valley Railroad 1939
- ALCO DL-109 diesel locos, in part with DL-110 booster 1940; successor PA-1 inherited many features
- Full-train styling of Gulf Coast Rebel pulled by DL-109 for GM&O 1940
- Streamstyled steam loco Ps-4 #1380 for The Tennessean of Southern Railway 1941
- Heat insulated food container (company unknown), US patent 2,367,409
- ACF subway car proposal for New York City (built as R11 by Budd), US patent Des.153,367, and for Boston 1947
- Proposal of suspended monorail mass transit system for Denver 1948

== Bibliography ==
- "Streamlining the Railroads". Product Engineering, June 1934
- "What Price Beauty of Line and Color". Metal Progress, August 1934
- "Stil und Werbung im Eisenbahnwesen", Verkehrswirtschaftliche Rundschau (Vienna), August 1935
- "Appeal Design in Railroad Equipment", Railway Age, November 30, 1935
- Portraits of the Iron Horse (with Robert S. Henry, 1937; reprinted 1976)
- On the Railroad (by Robert S.Henry, illustrated by Kuhler; 1938)
- In the Steel Mill(with Donald Wilhelm; 1939)
- "Otto Kuhler, an Original", "Trains Magazine", October 1975, pages 33 - 43.
- My Iron Journey – an autobiography (1967, 2nd edition 1978)
- The etchings of Otto Kuhler, Kennedy Galleries, New York 1985
- How We Make Steel, Otto Kuhler, 1939
- The Colorado Road: History, Motive Power and Equipment of the Colorado & Southern and Ft. Worth & Denver, by F. Hol Wagner Jr.
