= Hiawatha (Milwaukee Road trains) =

Fleet of luxury passenger trains originating in Chicago, Illinois

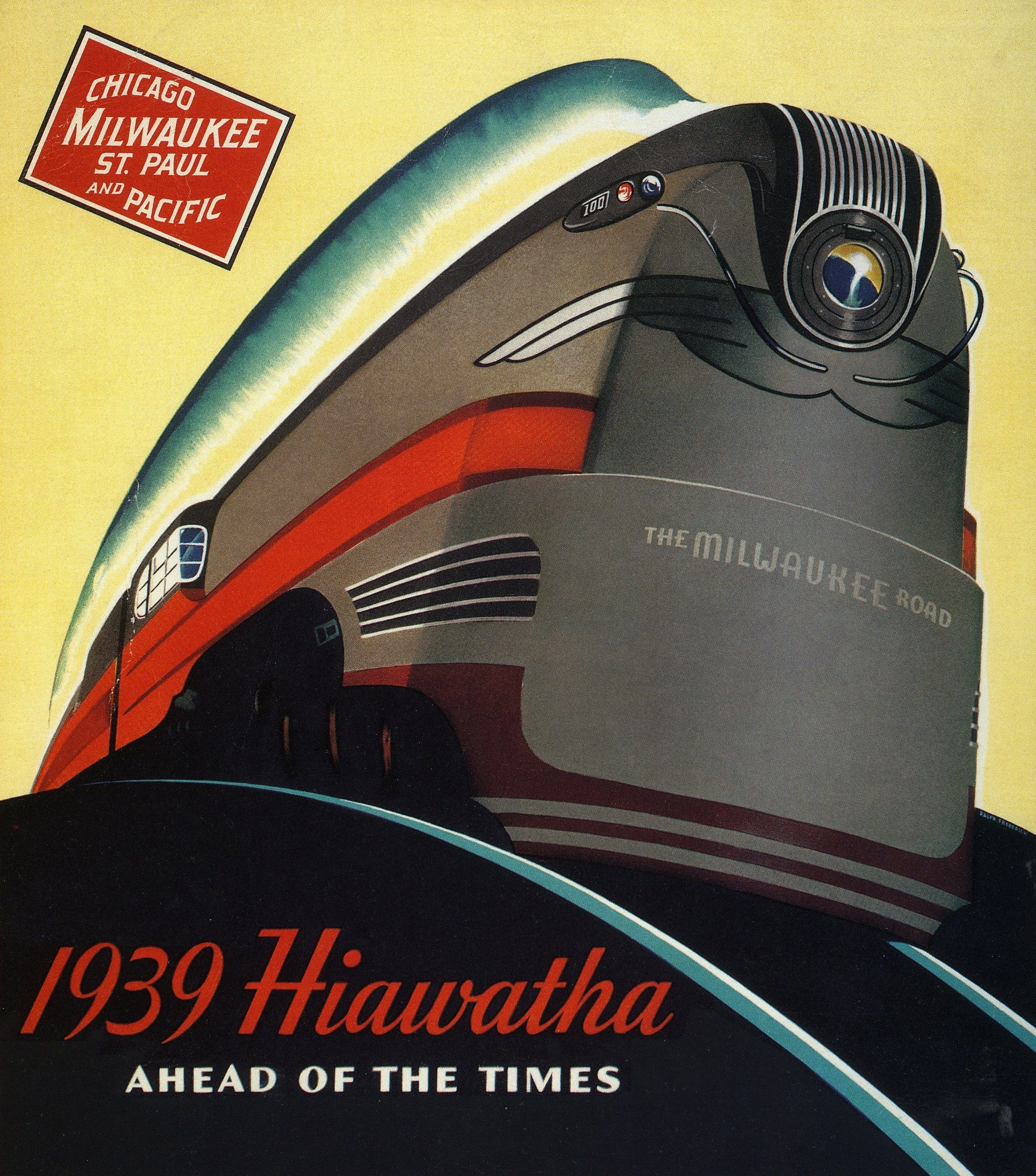
Stylized 1939 advertisement featuring a streamlined 4-6-4 class F7 steam locomotive.

The Hiawathas were a fleet of named passenger trains operated by the Chicago, Milwaukee, St. Paul and Pacific Railroad (also known as the Milwaukee Road) between Chicago and various destinations in the Midwest and Western United States. The most notable of these trains was the original Twin Cities Hiawatha, which served the Twin Cities in Minnesota. The train was named for the 1855 epic poem The Song of Hiawatha by Henry Wadsworth Longfellow. The current Amtrak Hiawatha train is directly descended from the Milwaukee Road trains.

== History ==
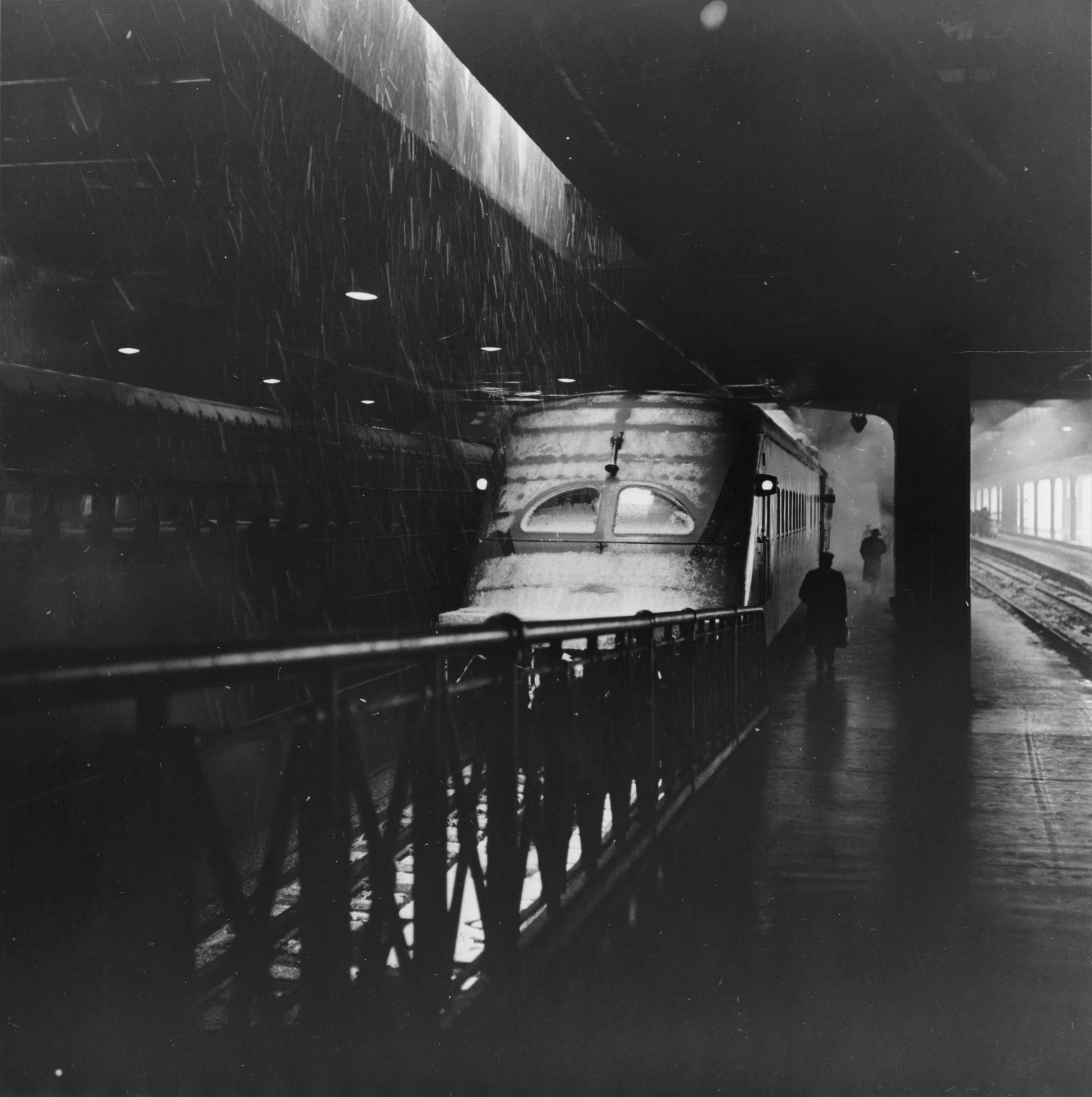
A 1935 Beaver Tail observation car at Union Station (Chicago) in 1943

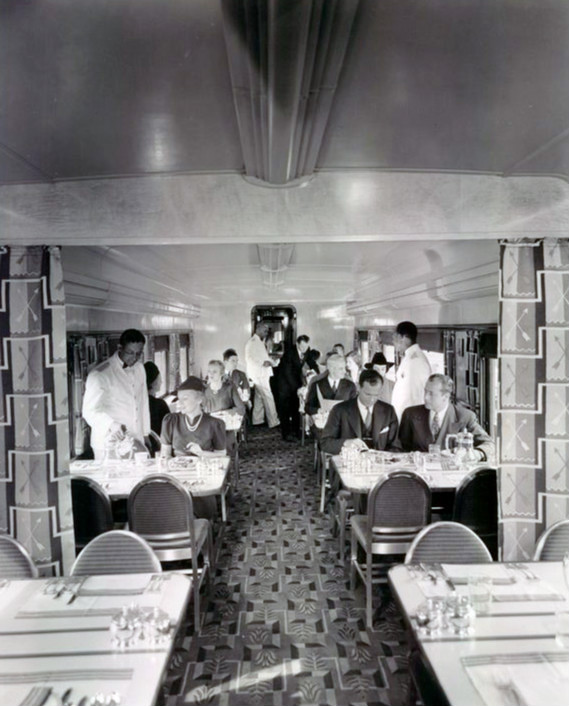
Interior of the dining cars on the Hiawatha, 1939

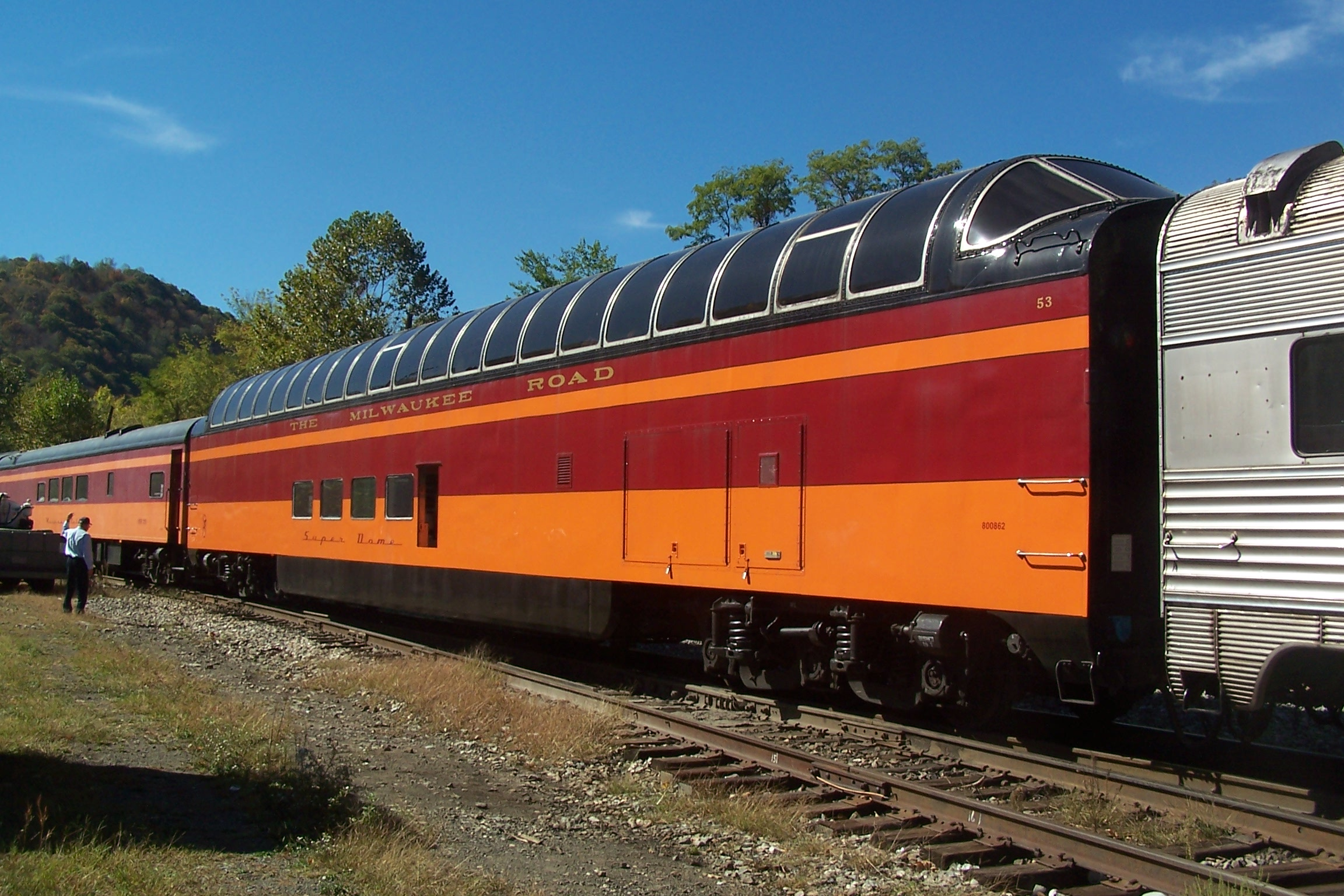
One of the Milwaukee Railroad's Super Dome cars.

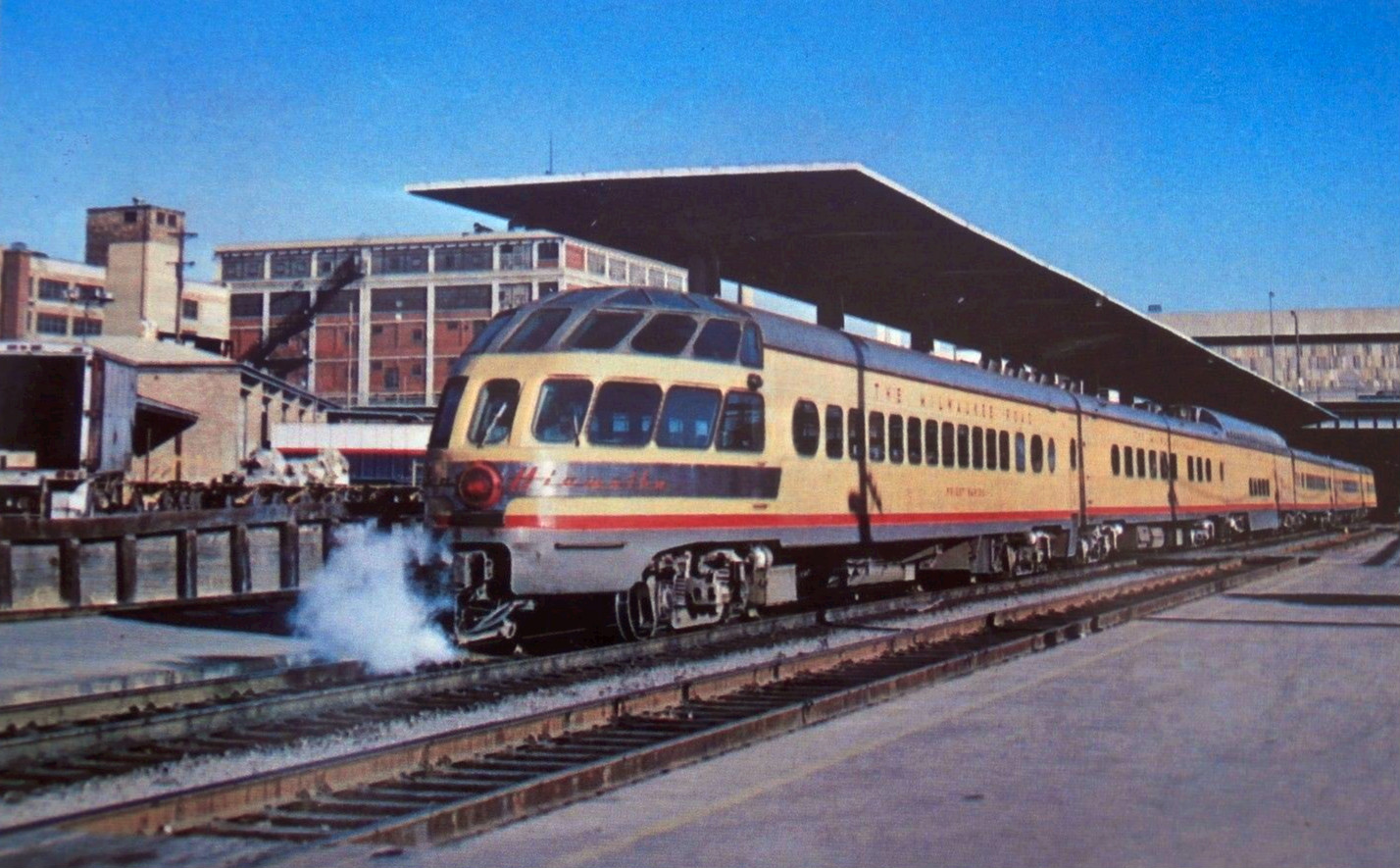
Skytop car "Priest Rapids", #189, in the Union Pacific paint scheme.

The first Hiawatha trains ran in 1935. By 1948, five routes carried the Hiawatha name:

- The Twin Cities Hiawatha — the main line route from Chicago through Milwaukee to St. Paul and Minneapolis, in Morning and Afternoon editions
- The North Woods Hiawatha — a spur route off the Chicago-Minnesota main line leading from New Lisbon to Minocqua, Wisconsin
- The Chippewa-Hiawatha — connected Chicago to Ontonagon in Michigan's Upper Peninsula via Milwaukee and Green Bay, Wisconsin
- The Midwest Hiawatha — used the Milwaukee Road's mainline across Illinois and Iowa to Sioux Falls, South Dakota, and Omaha, Nebraska (the train split into two parts in Manilla, Iowa)
- The Olympian Hiawatha — which traversed the Milwaukee mainline from Chicago-Twin Cities-Seattle/Tacoma.

=== Twin Cities Hiawatha ===
The Twin Cities Hiawatha was the original Hiawatha, beginning service between Chicago and the Twin Cities on May 29, 1935. The Hiawatha used styled streamlined Class A 4-4-2 steam locomotives built by the American Locomotive Company and was intended to compete directly with the Chicago, Burlington and Quincy Railroad's (Burlington Route) Twin Cities Zephyrs and Chicago and North Western Railway's Twin Cities 400.

The Milwaukee Road added a second train to the route on January 21, 1939, and the two trains were known as the Morning Hiawatha and Afternoon Hiawatha, although the brand Twin Cities Hiawatha was often employed. In 1947–1948, the Milwaukee Road again re-equipped its major passenger routes with new lightweight equipment. The Morning Hiawatha (trains 5 and 6) and Afternoon Hiawatha (trains 3 and 2) continued to operate between Chicago and Minneapolis until the latter train was discontinued on January 23, 1970. The last runs of the Morning Hiawatha were on April 30, 1971, immediately prior to the introduction of Amtrak.

=== Midwest Hiawatha ===
With the delivery of the 1938 trainsets, the original 1935 Hiawatha equipment was reassigned to the Chicago to Omaha/Sioux City route where it ran as the Midwest Hiawatha. The service began on December 11, 1940. The final trip for the Midwest Hiawatha from all terminals occurred on October 29, 1955. On the next day, October 30, 1955, the Milwaukee Road assumed operation of Union Pacific Railroad's City of San Francisco, City of Los Angeles, City of Denver, City of Portland and Challenger trains. The Midwest Hiawatha became two Sioux Falls-Chicago coaches that combined with the Challenger in Manilla. The Milwaukee Road dropped the name altogether in April 1956.

=== North Woods Hiawatha ===
The North Woods Hiawatha began in June 1936, branching off from the main Hiawatha route in New Lisbon, Wisconsin, to serve Minocqua, Wisconsin. The Milwaukee Road dropped the Hiawatha moniker in 1956 and discontinued the service altogether in 1970.

=== Olympian Hiawatha ===
A new long-distance Hiawatha, the Olympian Hiawatha from Chicago to the Pacific Northwest, was inaugurated in 1947. The sleeper cars and Skytop sleepers were not delivered until late 1948 and early 1949, so the train ran with Pullman heavyweights on the rear end, until delivery of the new cars. The train was designed by the famous designer Brooks Stevens of Milwaukee. Six Creek-series 8-bedroom Skytop lounge-sleepers were created, which had more windows and a more bulbous rear end than their Rapids-series parlor Skytop counterparts on the Morning Hiawatha and Afternoon Hiawatha. This train ceased operations on May 22, 1961, and the surplus equipment was sold to Canadian National Railways. One car, #15 Coffee Creek from the Olympian Hiawatha, is undergoing restoration.

=== Chippewa-Hiawatha ===
The Chippewa began in May 1937, running north through Milwaukee and Green Bay to Channing, Michigan (later extended to Ontonagon). It carried the Hiawatha moniker between 1948-1957 and was discontinued in 1960.

=== Amtrak ===
Under Amtrak, which assumed control of most intercity passenger rail service in the United States on May 1, 1971, the Hiawatha name survived in two forms. The first was a Chicago–Milwaukee–Minneapolis service, known simply as the Hiawatha. This would be renamed the Twin Cities Hiawatha, then extended to Seattle and renamed the North Coast Hiawatha. This service ended in 1979. In 2024, Amtrak reinstated Chicago–Milwaukee–St. Paul service with the Borealis.

The second was a Chicago–Milwaukee corridor known as the Hiawatha Service (as opposed to Hiawatha). Although Amtrak had retained Chicago–Milwaukee service during the transition, it did not name these trains until October 29, 1972. At this time both Hiawatha and Hiawatha Service could be found on the same timetable. Amtrak used a variety of names for this service between 1976–1989 before returning to the Hiawatha Service brand, which remains somewhat in use today and continues to use the Milwaukee Road's (now Canadian Pacific and in-name-only subsidiary Soo Line Railroad) route between Chicago and Milwaukee.

== Legacy ==
The All Aboard! 20th Century American Trains series of postage stamps from the United States Postal Service commemorated a Hiawatha train pulled by an F7-class 4-6-4 locomotive.

== See also ==
- Route of The Hiawatha mountain bike trail.
- Hiawatha (Amtrak train)

== Bibliography ==
- Scribbins, Jim (1970). The Hiawatha Story. Milwaukee, Wisconsin: Kalmbach Publishing Company. LCCN 70107874. OCLC 91468.
