= River Subdivision =

River Subdivision may refer to:

- River Subdivision (Canadian Pacific Railway) along the Mississippi River in Minnesota
- River Subdivision (BNSF Railway) along the Mississippi River in Missouri
- River Subdivision (CSX Transportation) along the Hudson River
- River Subdivision (SCRRA) along the Los Angeles River in California
- River Subdivision (Union Pacific Railroad) along the Missouri River
- River Subdivision (Wheeling and Lake Erie Railway) along the Ohio River
