= SS Lansdowne =

Steamer Lansdowne
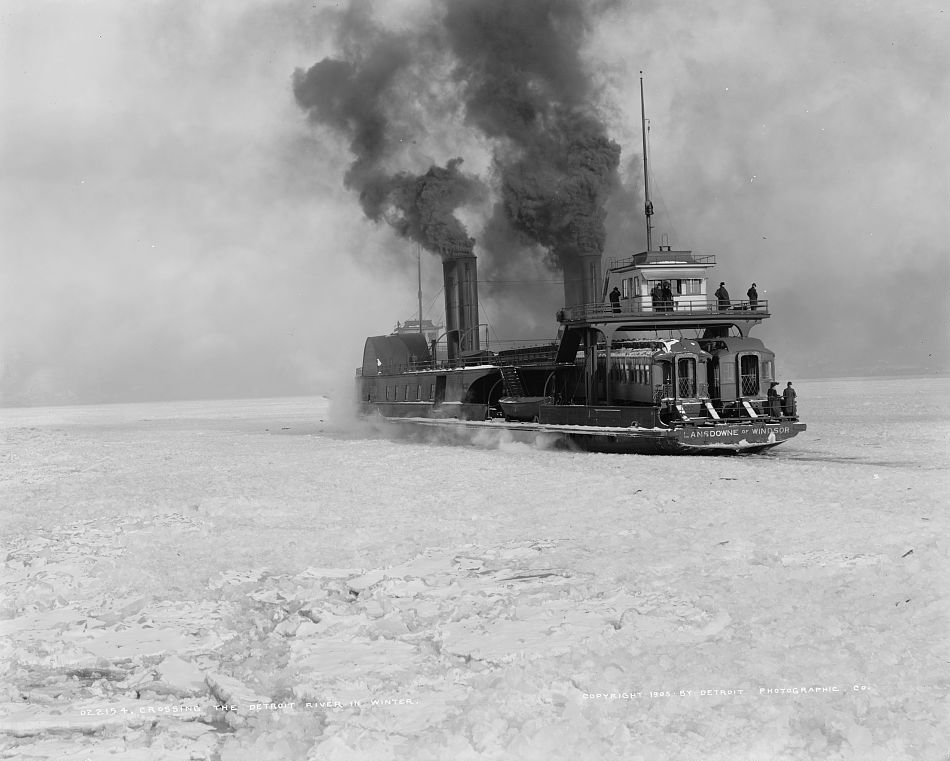
- Steamer Lansdowne crossing the Detroit River in 1905

History
- Builder: Detroit Dry Dock Company Wyandotte Shipyard
- Yard number: 66
- Launched: 1884
- In service: 1884–1956
- Identification: IMO number: 5203451
- Fate: Scrapped 2009

General characteristics
- Type: Railroad car ferry
- Propulsion: Sidewheeler

SS Lansdowne was a railroad car ferry built in 1884 by the Wyandotte Shipyard of the Detroit Dry Dock Company. It was used as a steamer from 1884 until 1970 between Detroit, Michigan, and Windsor, Ontario, across the Detroit River. At the time of its construction it was the longest ship on the Great Lakes at 312 feet (95 m). It was a sidewheeler, and at the time of its retirement it was the last sidewheeler serving on the Great Lakes, although in 1975 the sidewheel ferry Trillium returned to active service at Toronto after many years in layup. Lansdowne was captained by Nick Saad from 1942 to 1969 until his retirement, when he was relieved by his son James Saad-Miller. Capt. Jim Miller was last to man her under her own power, when she blew the cylinder head of the port engine coming out of Detroit Slip on midnight watch in 1970. The engines were from an even older paddle steamer, Michigan, built in 1878. Lansdowne was thereafter used as a barge, pushed by a towboat, until her final retirement.

In 1981 Lansdowne was converted by Specialty Restaurants Corporation of Anaheim, California, to a floating restaurant and was moored just east of Hart Plaza in Downtown Detroit. A pair of Milwaukee Road "Skytop Lounge" railcars were brought onto part of its deck while the remainder was occupied by additional restaurant structure including a below-deck banquet hall. Patrons had a front-row view of the Detroit street circuit that hosted the Formula One United States Grand Prix East. The restaurant in Detroit shut down in the late 1980s or early 1990s.

In 1999 Lansdowne was towed to Erie, Pennsylvania, where much of its superstructure was removed and the Skytop Lounge cars were stripped to bare shells with the intent of making it a riverfront restaurant in Erie. It sank at its moorings on 25 December 2005 and the City of Erie issued an order that it be removed by 1 March.

On 16 July 2006 it was removed from Erie and towed to an industrial part of the Buffalo River in Buffalo, New York. On 30 January 2008 it again took on water during a storm at its moorings in Buffalo and began to list. Specialty Restaurants' owner died in 2008 and whatever remaining initiative there was to restore Lansdowne died along with him. With pressure from Buffalo politicians to remove the "eyesore" from its shores, the Skytop Lounge cars were cut off their trucks and shipped to the Milwaukee Road Heritage Center in Montevideo, Minnesota, and the rest of the vessel was broken up for salvage in April 2009.
