= All Aboard! 20th Century American Trains =

US postage stamp series

- The Super Chief stamp, part of the five-stamp commemorative set. Santa Fe locomotive #6 (an EMD E1 unit) is seen painted in the Super Chief's distinctive Warbonnet livery.
- Type: Commemorative stamp
- Country of issue: United States
- Country of production: United States
- Location of production: United States Postal Service
- Date of issue: August 1999
- Designer: Ted Rose
- Printer: United States Postal Service
- Commemorates: American railroad design and heritage
- Depicts: Named passenger trains of the 1930s and 1940s
- Notability: Part of a United States Postal Service tribute to 20th-century trains
- Face value: 33¢

In August 1999, the United States Postal Service issued a set of 33¢ postage stamps entitled All Aboard! 20th Century American Trains to "pay tribute to American industry and design, and specifically to the heritage of our railroads." Artist Ted Rose created five watercolor images depicting the following celebrated American named passenger trains from the 1930s and 1940s:

- the Congressional of the Pennsylvania Railroad;
- the Daylight of the Southern Pacific Railroad;
- the Hiawatha of the Chicago, Milwaukee, St. Paul and Pacific Railroad;
- the Super Chief of the Atchison, Topeka and Santa Fe Railway; and
- the 20th Century Limited of the New York Central Railroad.

Descriptive text regarding each of the trains was listed on the gummed side of each stamp.

At the same time, the USPS offered for sale a booklet of "20 U.S. Postal Service Ready-To-Mail Stamped Postal Cards" which contained four sets of the five paintings.
