= Midwest Hiawatha =

Passenger train in the United States

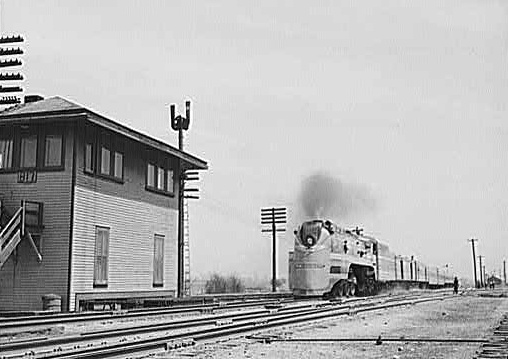
- The Midwest Hiawatha passes through Bensenville, Illinois in 1943. The locomotive is an F7 4-6-4.

Overview
- First service: December 11, 1940
- Last service: April 1956
- Successor: Challenger
- Former operator: Milwaukee Road

Route
- Average journey time: 8 hours 45 minutes (Omaha); 11 hours 55 minutes (Sioux Falls)
- Train numbers: 102 (eastbound), 103 (westbound)
Route map

The Midwest Hiawatha was a passenger train on the Milwaukee Road, one of many Milwaukee Road trains with a Hiawatha name. The service began December 11, 1940 between Chicago's Union Station and Omaha, Nebraska, Sioux Falls, South Dakota, through northern Illinois and Iowa and South Dakota.

Initially the train used Atlantic 4-4-2 steam engines and cars freed by the 1938 re-equipping of the Twin Cities Hiawathas, including the distinctive Beaver Tail parlor-observation cars. In 1940 the train covered 488 miles (785 km) between Chicago and Omaha in 480 minutes. Unlike the competition between Chicago and the Missouri River, the Midwest Hiawatha was scheduled during daylight, which helped boost patronage. For most of its history, it carried coaches for both Omaha and Sioux Falls with tap-diners and parlor services generally run between Chicago and Sioux Falls. The two sections of the train split at Manilla, Iowa.

The final trips for the Midwest Hiawatha were on October 29, 1955. The next day the Milwaukee Road assumed operation of Union Pacific Railroad's City of San Francisco, City of Los Angeles, City of Denver, City of Portland and Challenger trains. The Midwest Hiawatha became two Sioux Falls–Chicago coaches which combined with the Challenger in Manilla. The Milwaukee Road dropped the name altogether in April 1956, when the eastward was rescheduled to leave Omaha at 2:45 AM CST.
