= Olympian Hiawatha =

1911–1961 passenger train from Chicago to the Pacific Northwest

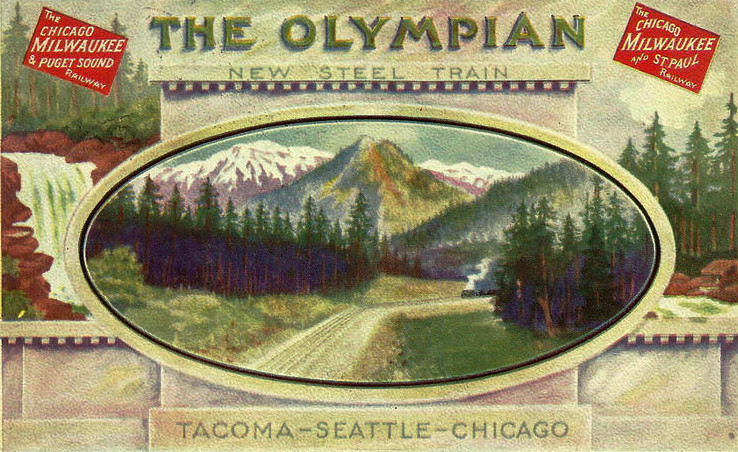
- 1911 promotional postcard for the new train, which had all steel passenger cars from its beginning

Overview
- Status: Discontinued
- Locale: United States
- First service: May 28, 1911; 115 years ago
- Last service: May 22, 1961; 65 years ago
- Former operators: Chicago, Milwaukee & Puget Sound Railway (5/28/1911-1/1/1913) Chicago, Milwaukee, St. Paul and Pacific Railroad (1913-1961)

Route
- Termini: Chicago, Illinois; Tacoma, Washington
- Distance travelled: 2,189 miles (Chicago-Seattle), 2,207 miles (Chicago-Tacoma)
- Service frequency: Daily
- Train number: 15/16

Technical
- Track gauge: 4 ft 8 1/2 in (1,435 mm)

The Olympian and its successor the Olympian Hiawatha were passenger trains operated by the Chicago, Milwaukee, St. Paul and Pacific Railroad (the "Milwaukee Road") between Chicago and the Pacific Northwest. The Olympian operated from 1911 to 1947 and was, along with its running mate the Columbian, the first all-steel train to operate in the Pacific Northwest. The streamlined Olympian Hiawatha operated from 1947 to 1961 and was one of several Milwaukee Road trains to carry the name "Hiawatha". The Olympian Hiawatha was designed by industrial designer Brooks Stevens and included the distinctive glassed-in "Skytop" observation-sleeping cars. It later featured full-length "Super Dome" cars.

== History ==
=== Heavyweight Olympian ===
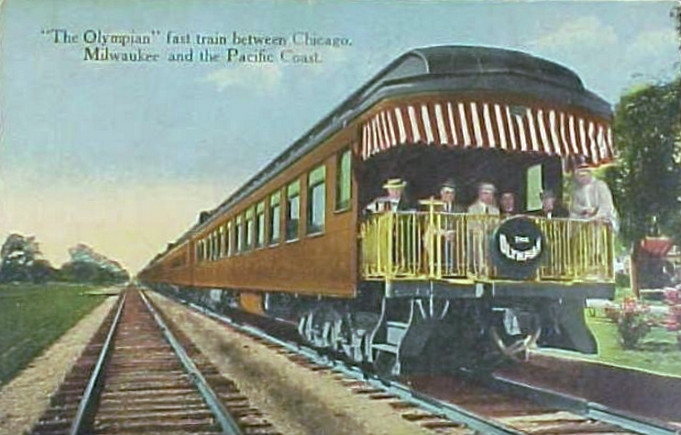
Postcard circa 1914 that called the Olympian the "fast train" to the Pacific Northwest, distinguishing it from the slower Columbian

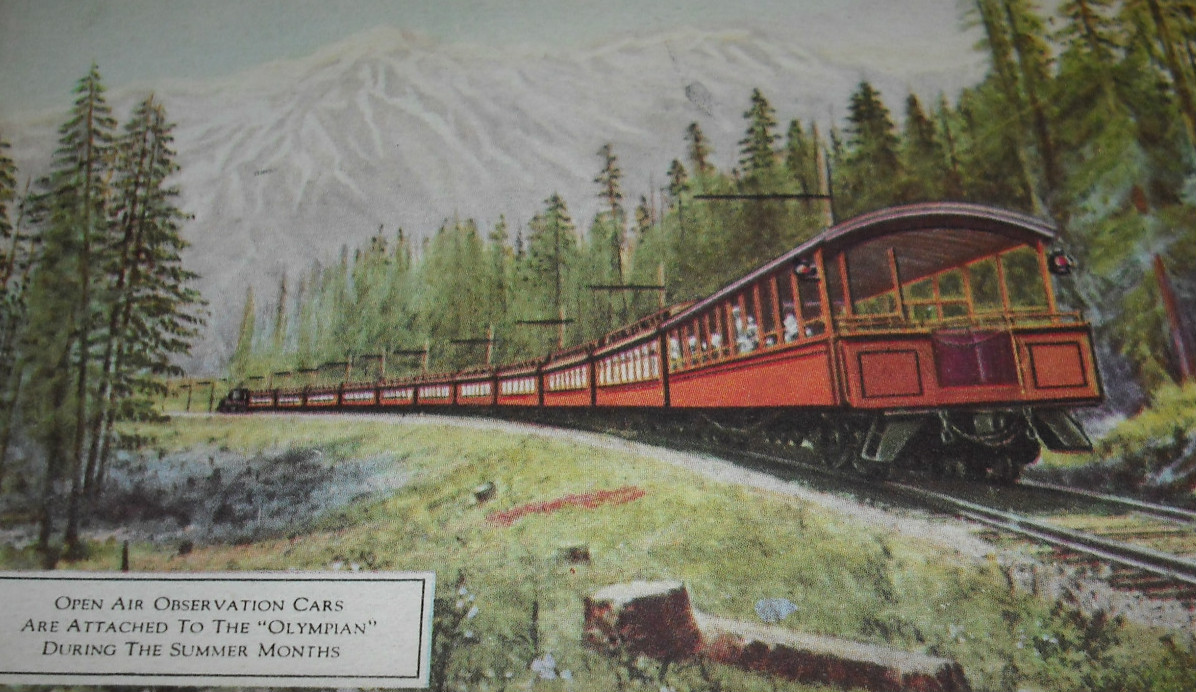
Open air observation car used during the summer months, c. 1915

In 1909 the Milwaukee Road opened the "Puget Sound extension" from South Dakota to Seattle and Tacoma, completing the last line from Chicago to the coast. The Milwaukee Road ordered cars for two new all-steel luxury trains to run Chicago–Milwaukee–St. Paul–Seattle–Tacoma. The two new trains debuted on May 28, 1911. They were the first all-steel trains to operate in the Pacific Northwest. The Milwaukee Road named the two trains the Olympian and Columbian. The Olympian took 72 hours between Chicago and Seattle, necessitating seven sets of equipment to cover the service. Starting in 1914 the Olympian used the route of the Union Pacific Railroad to serve Spokane, Washington.

In 1915 the Milwaukee Road completed its first electrified section of rail line, from Harlowton to Deer Lodge, Montana, a feat that was advertised to passengers since electrification eliminated the soot normally associated with steam-powered rail travel prior to the era of air-conditioning. Extensions in the 1910s and 1920s resulted in 649 miles (1,044 km) of electrified main line, in Montana/Idaho and over the Cascades in Washington. The 440 miles (710 km) of electrified line between Harlowton, Montana, and Avery, Idaho, was the longest continuous electrified rail line in the world.

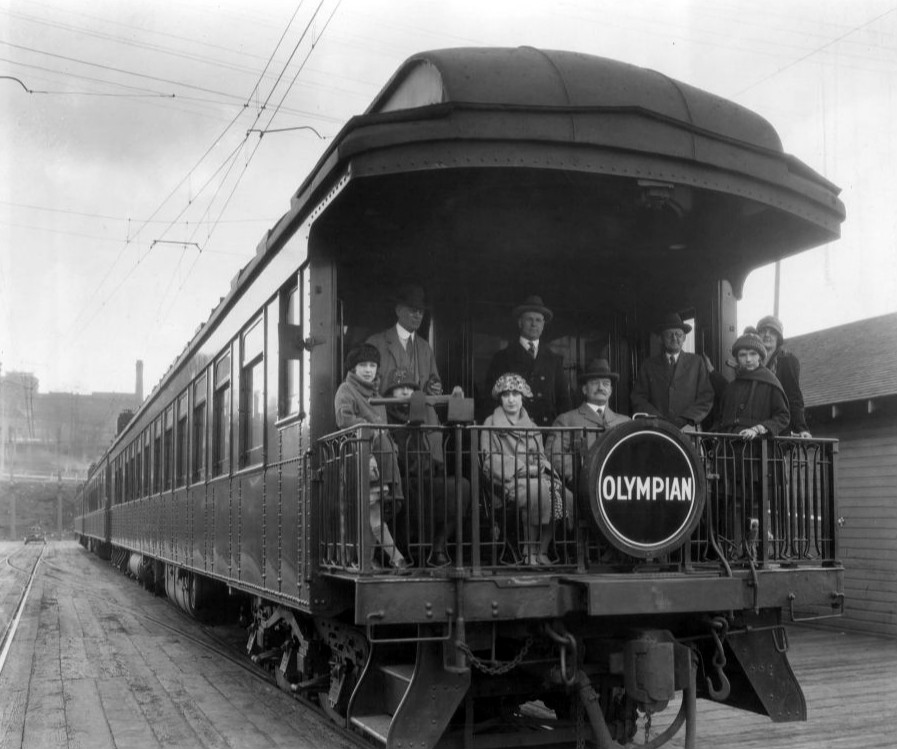
Olympian observation car

In 1926 the Olympian was scheduled to run from Chicago to Seattle in 70 hours. That year Milwaukee contracted with Pullman-Standard for new cars and the train was re-equipped, the new trains making their first runs in August 1927. The steel cars were painted orange and maroon and were among the first to carry broadcast radio receivers. The Olympian was the first western transcontinental train to be equipped throughout with roller-bearings. Capitalizing on its soot-free electrification, the train carried open gondola cars during the summer. To increase ridership the Milwaukee Road opened its first railroad-owned hotel near Yellowstone National Park, the Gallatin Gateway Inn. Gallatin Gateway was reached from a spur that reached the main line at Three Forks, Montana, and prior to the Great Depression the Olympian carried through sleepers for it.

Both the Olympian and Columbian operated into 1930, but as ridership fell during the depression the Columbian was dropped, ending in 1931. The Olympian received air-conditioned cars in 1934–1935. The Olympian received additional equipment in 1937, including new Pullman cars and dining cars based on the highly successful Hiawatha streamliners then operating between Chicago and the Twin Cities. Between December 1943 and May 1947 the sleeping and coach portions of the Olympian operated in separate sections.

=== Post-war Olympian Hiawatha ===
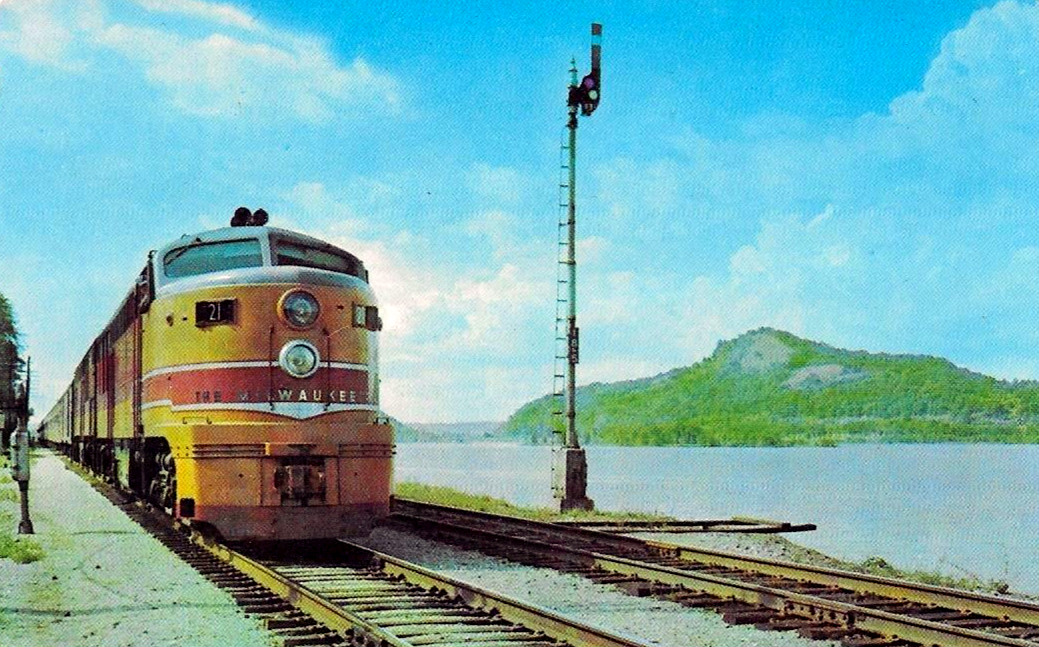
Postcard photo of the streamlined train

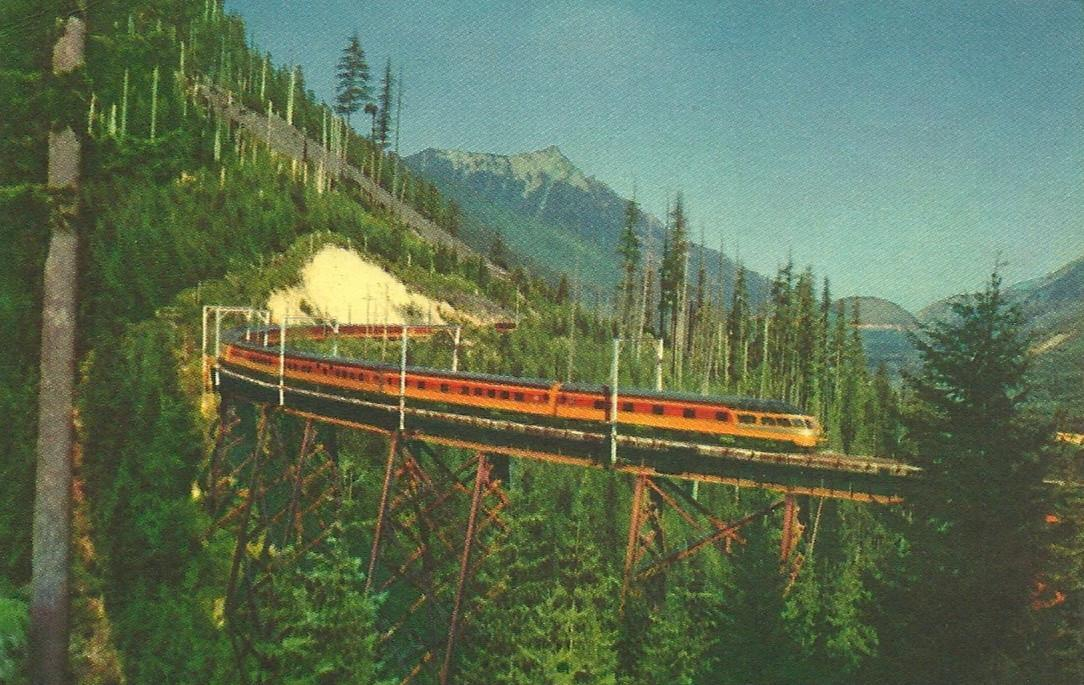
The train in the Cascades; the Skytop car is visible.

On June 29, 1947, the Milwaukee Road inaugurated its streamlined flagship, the Olympian Hiawatha on a 43-hour, 30-minute schedule. The Milwaukee advertised the faster train as a "speedliner".

To meet new streamlined competition from the Northern Pacific and Great Northern, the train was launched with streamlined and heavyweight equipment. The Milwaukee's insistence on its own radical designs also contributed to delays in delivery. The first streamlined cars, Touralux open berth sleepers, dining and lounge cars were home-built by the Milwaukee's Menomonee Valley shops. By 1949, the remaining cars were delivered by Pullman-Standard. The former Olympian heavyweight consists for a time continued to run on the older Olympian schedule, once again named the Columbian.

Designed by industrial designer Brooks Stevens, the Olympian Hiawatha included the Milwaukee Road's signature Skytop solarium observation car. Similar to those built for the Twin Cities Hiawathas, the Olympian Hiawatha's Skytops had more glass area from the rear forward and sleeping compartments in the forward two-thirds of the car. The Milwaukee Road billed the Skytops as "the perfect ending for a perfect train".

The Skytop observation cars have been described as the most distinctive railway cars ever built. The Milwaukee Road ordered several pairs of Fairbanks-Morse diesels with an orange, maroon and stainless steel exterior by Stevens. The grill/lounge and dining cars had angled seating for more interior space and a better view. The stunning trains had the Milwaukee's orange and maroon livery and green and gold seating and carpets and wood veneer with stainless steel trim. Six complete train-sets were ordered; in 1952 the first full-length dome cars, called "super domes" were added. In 1957 the train was repainted into the Union Pacific Railroad’s Armour Yellow colors.

While the Milwaukee Road promoted the Olympian Hiawatha and its scenic route through Idaho and Montana's Bitterroot Mountains and the Cascade range in Washington, the railroad competed with the Great Northern Railway's Empire Builder, the Northern Pacific Railway's North Coast Limited and the growing airlines. The Olympian Hiawatha was never a financial success. Of the three Chicago-Pacific Northwest trains mentioned, it was also in the worst position, serving fewer large cities than either the GN’s or NP’s train and paralleling the latter for much of the route. On May 22, 1961, the train was discontinued, one of the first of the great name trains to end service.

In 1955 the Milwaukee Road assumed operation of the Overland Route "Cities" trains between Chicago and Omaha. The Milwaukee Road continued to serve the Pacific northwest through its shared passenger services with the Union Pacific Railroad, particularly the City of Portland. Between 1955 and 1957 the Milwaukee briefly marketed a City of Portland - Olympian Hiawatha "circuit route" at a reduced price with some success but the package was eventually discontinued.

Following the discontinuance of the Olympian Hiawatha much of its equipment was reassigned to the Milwaukee Road-Union Pacific Cities trains. The six sleeper-Skytop observation cars and six of the Milwaukee Road's "Super Domes" briefly saw service on these trains. In 1962 they were sold to the Canadian National Railway where they were placed in service on the Montreal-to-Halifax trains and the Toronto-Vancouver Super Continental. They were finally retired in 1971.

With the discontinuance of the Olympian Hiawatha in 1961, trains No. 15 and 16 continued to operate as an unnamed passenger train between Minneapolis and Deer Lodge, Montana with coaches, a Touralux open-berth sleeper and cafe car. In 1964 it was cut back to a coach-only train to Aberdeen, South Dakota, and completely discontinued on April 17, 1969.

== Legacy ==
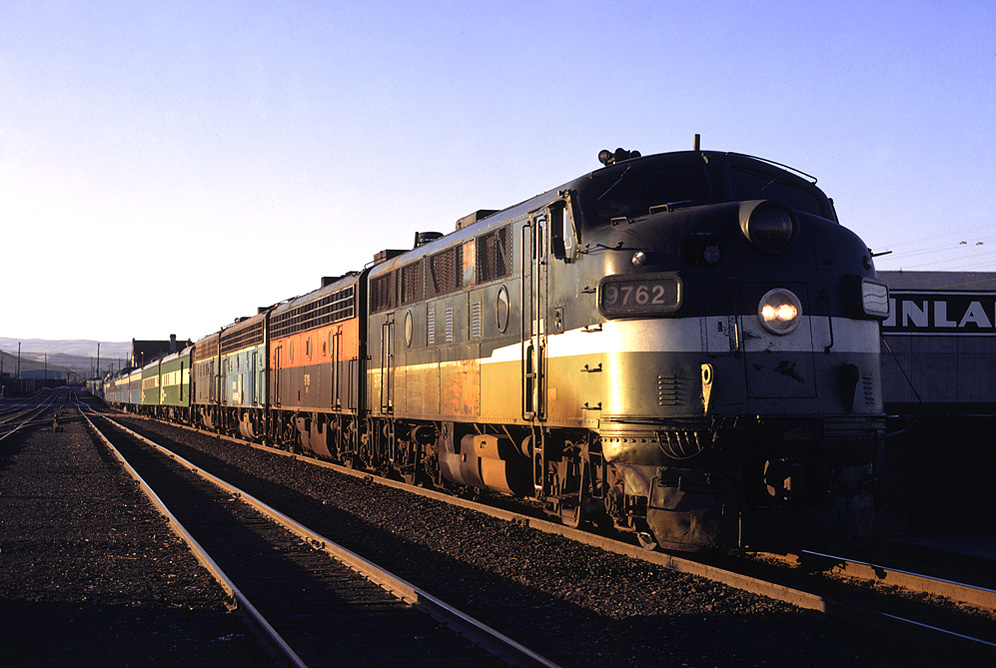
Amtrak's North Coast Hiawatha at Yakima, Washington, in 1971

Between 1971 and 1979 Amtrak operated the North Coast Hiawatha, a thrice-weekly train that used the Milwaukee's Chicago-Milwaukee-Minneapolis mainline and the Northern Pacific route west of Minneapolis. The train's name was an amalgam of North Coast Limited and Olympian Hiawatha.

Deferred maintenance forced the Milwaukee Road to abandon its electrification in 1974. Facing bankruptcy, the Milwaukee Road abandoned its "Puget Sound extension" in 1980, eliminating much of the route of the Olympian Hiawatha. Several sections of the route are now part of the National Forest and state rails-to-trails programs including the most scenic section through the Bitterroot Mountains.

Major parts of Olympian's route were acquired by the Soo Line Railroad (now a subsidiary of Canadian Pacific Kansas City), and by the Burlington Northern Railroad (now BNSF Railway). The former Milwaukee Road (now Canadian Pacific) mainline from Chicago to St. Paul, Minnesota, continues to see high passenger ridership on Amtrak's Chicago-Milwaukee Hiawatha, Chicago-St. Paul Borealis, and Chicago-Minneapolis-Pacific Northwest Empire Builder.

Several scenic sections of the route of the Olympian Hiawatha have become public trails and park land. These include the "Route of the Hiawatha" in the Bitterroot Mountains of Idaho, the "Route of the Olympian" along Montana's St. Regis River and Iron Horse State Park in Washington's Snoqualmie Pass.

== See also ==
- Hiawatha
- Iron Horse State Park
- Route of the Hiawatha
