= Skytop Lounge =

U.S. passenger railroad cars built for Milwaukee Road; in use 1940s-1970s

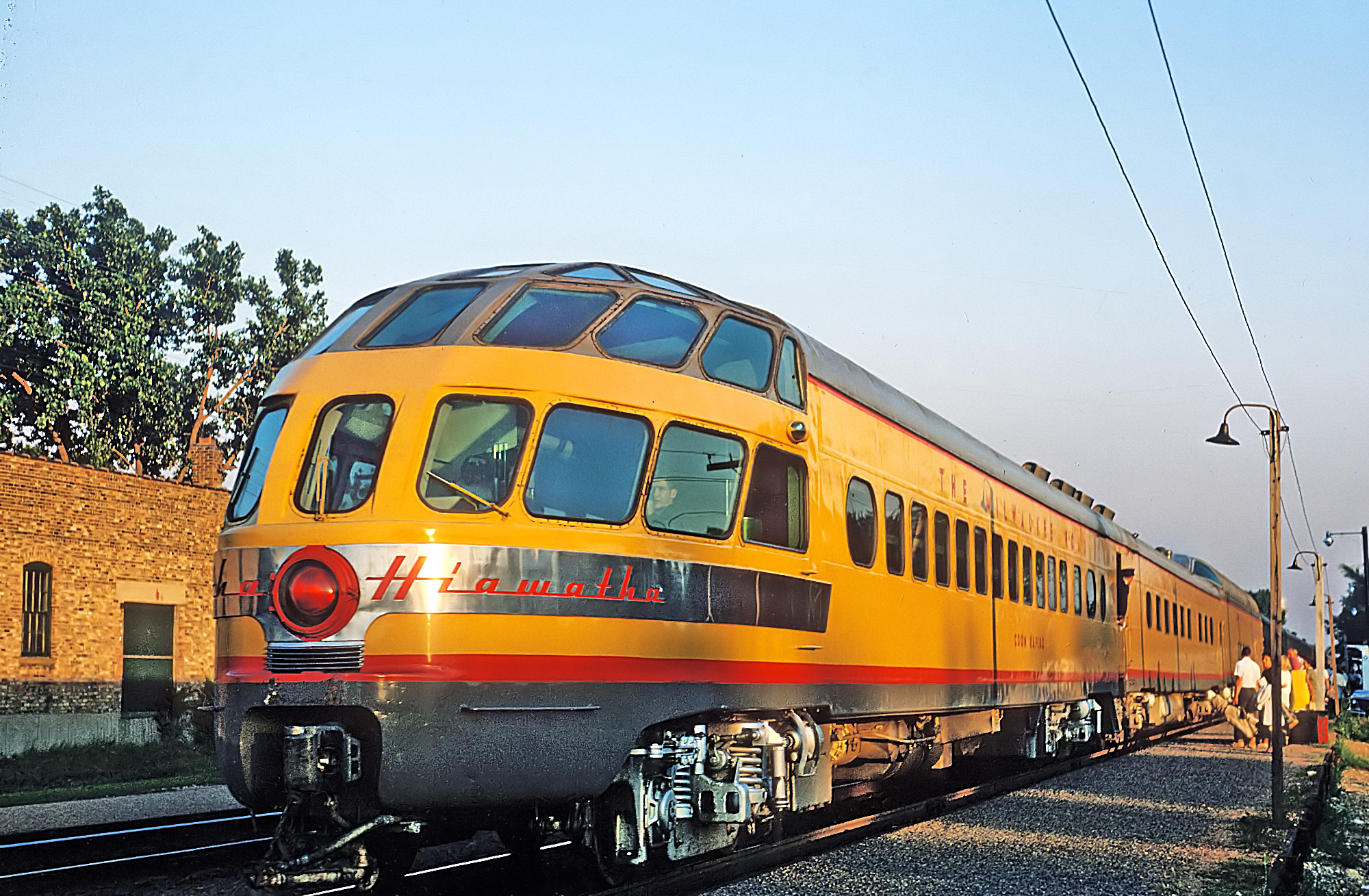
- The Coon Rapids on the Twin Cities Hiawatha at Glenview, Illinois in 1964. The car is painted in Union Pacific colors

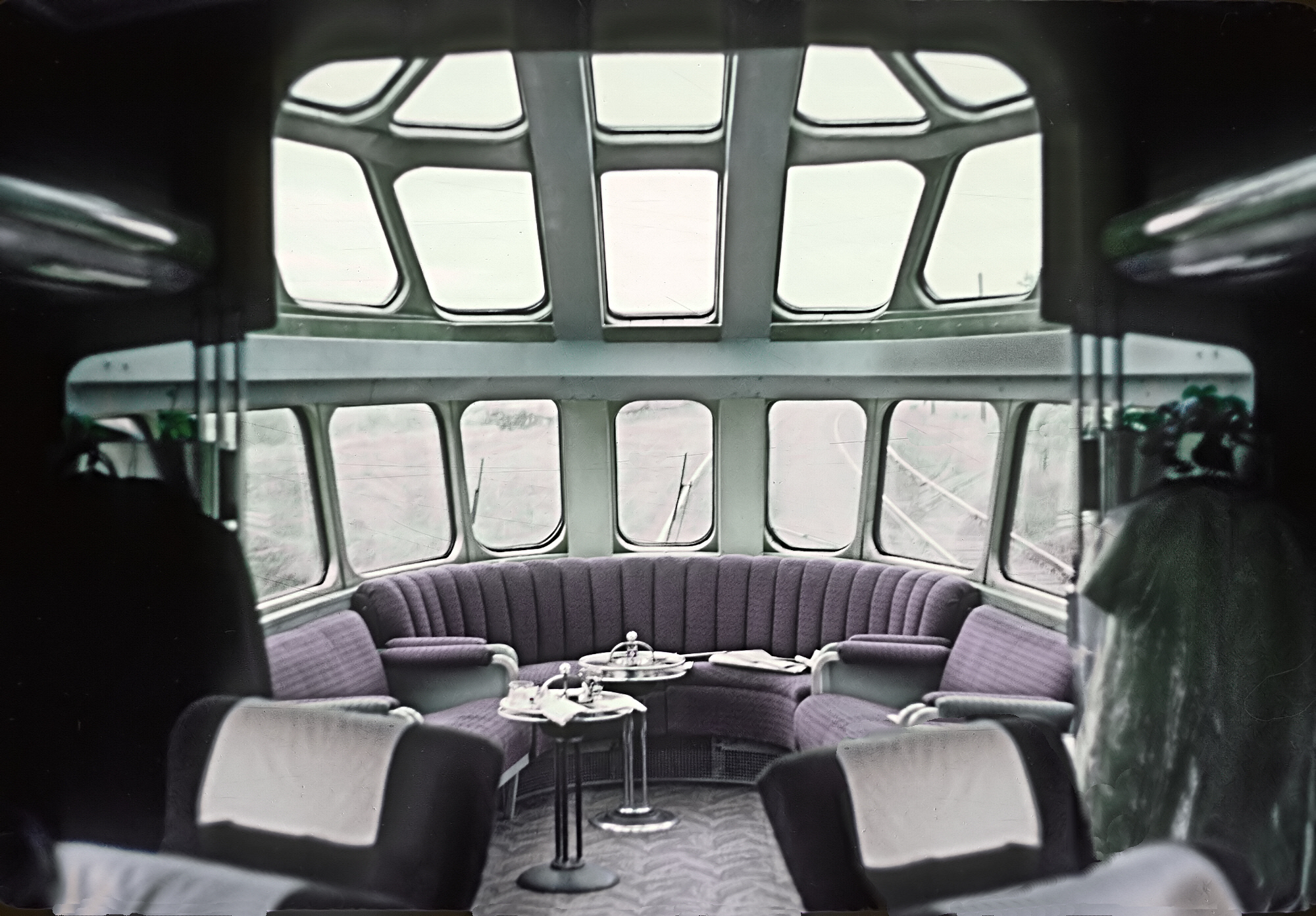
- The interior of a Skytop Lounge, photographed in 1967 aboard the Afternoon Hiawatha
- In service: 1948–1977
- Manufacturers: Pullman-Standard (sleepers); Milwaukee Road (parlor-lounges)
- Designer: Brooks Stevens
- Replaced: Beaver Tail
- Number built: Sleeper-lounge cars: 6; observation lounge cars: 4
- Number in service: 1 used in excursion service.
- Number preserved: At least 3 complete cars remain. Other hulks are stored at the Milwaukee Road Heritage Center in Montevideo, Minnesota.
- Fleet numbers: Sleeper-lounge: MILW 12, 14–18; Parlor-lounge: MILW 186–189
- Capacity: Sleeper-lounge car: 16 in eight bedrooms; 19 lounge seats in solarium; Parlor-Lounge car: 12 lounge seats in solarium; 24 Parlor seats; 5 seats in drawing room
- Operators: Milwaukee Road (1948–1970); Canadian National Railway (1964–1977)

Specifications
- Track gauge: 1,435 mm (4 ft 8 1/2 in)

The Skytop Lounges were a fleet of streamlined passenger cars with parlor-lounge cars built by the Chicago, Milwaukee, St. Paul and Pacific Railroad ("the Milwaukee Road") and sleeper-lounges built by Pullman-Standard in 1948. The cars were designed by famed industrial designer Brooks Stevens. The fleet included both parlor-lounges and sleeping cars. The lounges entered service in 1948 on the Twin Cities Hiawatha, while the sleeping cars were used on the long-distance Olympian Hiawatha. In 1964 the Milwaukee Road sold the sleeping cars to the Canadian National Railway, which operated them until 1977. The parlor cars continued in service with the Milwaukee Road until 1970, when they were retired.

== Background ==
In 1935, the Milwaukee Road introduced the original Hiawatha between Chicago and the Twin Cities to great acclaim. The new trains covered the 420 miles (680 km) in 7 hours. Their equipment included the popular "Tip-Top-Tavern" and the distinctive "Beaver Tail" lounge observation cars. From the beginning the Hiawathas were known for speed and stylish design. Such was the success of the train that the Milwaukee Road would introduce new equipment again in 1936, 1937, 1938, and 1942.

The Second World War prevented additional improvements, but by 1947 the Milwaukee Road was looking to improve its services. For the next and as it turned out final equipment set for the Twin Cities Hiawatha the Milwaukee Road turned to Brooks Stevens, an industrial designer and Milwaukee native. Beyond the Twin Cities Hiawathas, the Milwaukee Road planned to relaunch the transcontinental Olympian with new streamlined equipment, a new schedule, and a new name: the Olympian Hiawatha.

== Design ==
Breaking with the "Beaver Tail" design, the rear of the Skytop Lounge was 90% glass, with multiple rows of windows reaching up to form the ceiling. In the four parlor-lounges this "solarium" contained 12 seats, with an additional 24 seats in the interior of the car. At the front of the car was a four-seat drawing room. The interior featured wood paneling, characteristic of Milwaukee Road designs. The Milwaukee Road contracted with Pullman-Standard for six sleeping cars based on the parlor-lounge design. The sleeping cars featured reduced seating in the solarium to make room for eight double bedrooms. Pullman-Standard did not adopt wood paneling for its interiors.

== Service history ==
The parlor-lounge Skytop Lounges entered service on the Morning and Afternoon Hiawathas on May 29, 1948. The Milwaukee Road touted the lounges as "the finishing touch to a perfect train." On April 1, 1969, the Milwaukee Road removed the lounges from the Morning Hiawatha. Skytop Lounges continued to operate on the Afternoon Hiawatha. The Milwaukee Road discontinued the Afternoon Hiawatha on January 23, 1970, ending the use of Skytop Lounges by the Milwaukee Road.

The sleeping cars spent even less time in Milwaukee service. Pullman-Standard delivered the cars between December 1948 and January 1949 for use on the Olympian Hiawatha, which operated between Chicago and Tacoma, Washington. The Milwaukee Road discontinued the Olympian Hiawatha on May 22, 1961, in the face of mounting passenger losses. In 1964 the Milwaukee Road sold all six to the Canadian National Railway (along with six of the Super Domes), which dubbed them "Skyview" lounges and put them into service on the Ocean. The Canadian National Railway took them out of service in the early 1970s and disposed of them in 1977. Two of the sleeping cars later became part of the SS Lansdowne, a floating restaurant in Detroit, Michigan. After that venture failed the remains of the cars were purchased by the Milwaukee Road Historical Association in 2009 and shipped to a museum in Montevideo, Minnesota.

== Fleet list ==
Table of Parlor-lounge car names and numbers
Milwaukee Road No.	Milwaukee Road Name	Notes
186	Cedar Rapids	Currently in use by the Friends of the 261
187	Coon Rapids	Exact disposition unknown
188	Dell Rapids	On display at the Museum of Arts and Sciences
189	Priest Rapids	Scrapped 1970

Table of Sleeper-lounge car names and numbers
Milwaukee Road No.	Milwaukee Road name	Canadian National No.	Canadian National Name	Notes
12	Alder Creek	1900	Mahone	Scrapped by CN
14	Arrow Creek	1901	Malpeque	Hulk stored at the Milwaukee Road Heritage Center
15	Coffee Creek	1902	Fundy	Currently Owned by the Aberdeen, Carolina and Western Railway in North Carolina, US. Previously Under restoration at Iowa Pacific
16	Gold Creek	1903	Trinity	Hulk stored at the Milwaukee Road Heritage Center
17	Marble Creek	1904	Baddeck	Scrapped
18	Spanish Creek	1905	Gaspe	Scrapped by CN

== Preservation ==
Several of the Skytops were preserved. Former parlor-lounge No. 186, the Cedar Rapids, belongs to the Friends of the 261 and is used on charter trips and excursions. Former parlor-lounge No. 188, the Dell Rapids, is on display at the Museum of Arts and Sciences in Daytona Beach, Florida. Former parlor-lounge No. 187, the Coon Rapids was last spotted around 1979, and is thought to be stored with the last two Baldwin RF-16s in Wells, MI as part of a private collection. Former sleeper-lounge No. 15 Coffee Creek was undergoing restoration by Iowa Pacific. After the bankruptcy of Iowa Pacific it was acquired by the Aberdeen, Carolina and Western Railway.

== See also ==
- Dome car
- Observation car
