= River Subdivision (Canadian Pacific Railway) =

Railway line in Minnesota

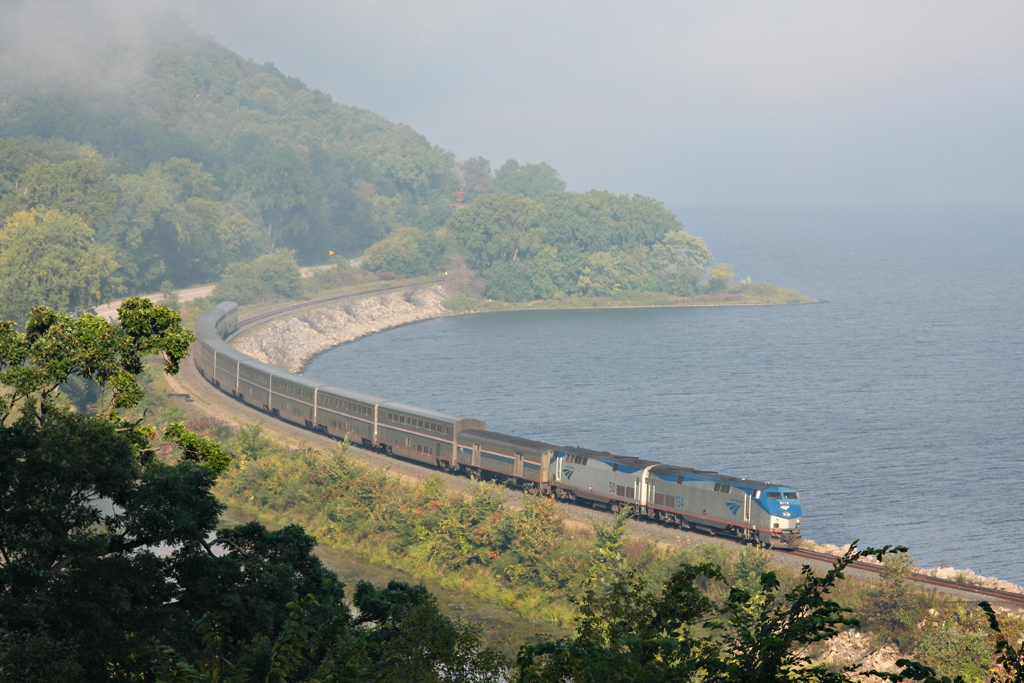
- Amtrak's Empire Builder passes through Maple Springs in 2009.

Overview
- Status: Active
- Owner: Canadian Pacific Kansas City
- Locale: Minnesota
- Termini: Saint Paul; La Crescent

Service
- Type: Freight, passenger
- Operator(s): Canadian Pacific Kansas City, Amtrak

History
- Commenced: 1865
- Completed: 1872

Technical
- Line length: 124 mi (200 km)
- Number of tracks: 1–2
- Track gauge: 4 ft 8 1/2 in (1,435 mm) standard gauge

The River Subdivision or River Sub is a railway line along the Mississippi River that runs approximately 124 miles (200 km) from Saint Paul, Minnesota south to La Crescent. U.S. Highway 61 closely parallels the route between La Crescent and Red Wing. The line is operated by the Canadian Pacific Kansas City through its subsidiary, the Soo Line Railroad. BNSF Railway operates the complementary St. Croix Subdivision which traces the eastern side of the river in Minnesota and Wisconsin. The two routes share some track between Saint Paul and St. Croix Junction, near Hastings.

== History ==
The line's origins trace to the Minnesota and Pacific Railroad Company, which started building a line from Saint Paul southward along the river in 1865. The line was completed to Minnesota City in 1870, and made a junction with the Winona and St. Peter Railroad (under control of the Chicago and North Western Railway) in 1871. In December 1871, the river line was sold to the Chicago, Milwaukee and St. Paul Railroad, and it continued to be operated by the Milwaukee Road for over a century. The Milwaukee Road had a crossing in Winona and immediately made use of their new connection to Saint Paul. They extended the line south to La Crescent in 1872 and built a new bridge over the river to La Crosse, Wisconsin.

While most of the route has been used by passenger trains since it first opened (the southern crossing was primarily used for freight), one of the most famous trains to use it was Milwaukee Road's Hiawatha, which began service in 1935. Infrastructure for automatic cab signaling had been installed in the 1920s or 1930s, allowing the railroad to operate trains at high speed along the route with a good level of safety. The Hiawatha ran at up to 90 miles per hour (140 km/h) along the river for brief stretches, but the train really made a name for itself by regularly running at over 100 miles per hour (160 km/h) through Wisconsin on its way to Chicago.

== Current usage ==
Today, Amtrak's Empire Builder and Amtrak's Borealis follow the Hiawatha's former route between the Twin Cities and Chicago, and stops at Red Wing and Winona along the River Sub.
