= Super Dome (railcar) =

Fleet of full-length dome cars

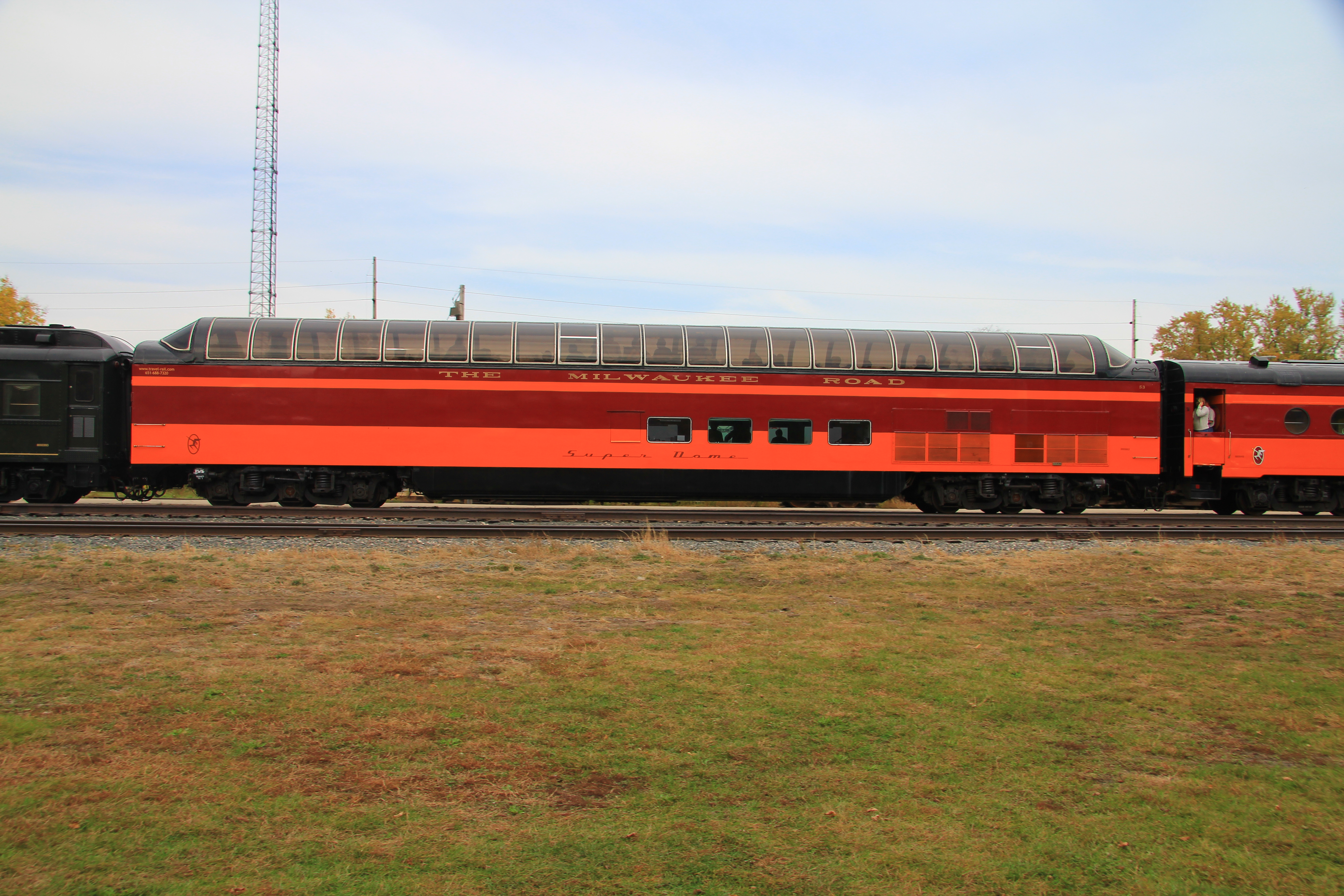
- Ex-Milwaukee Road Super Dome #53 at Winona, Minnesota, in 2010

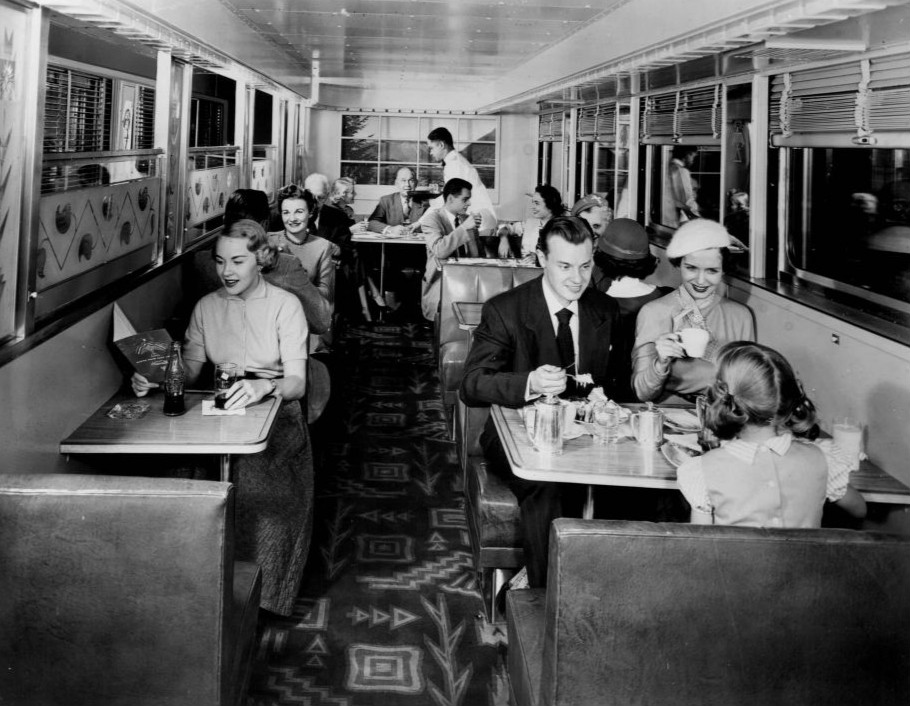
- The lower-level lounge area in 1952.
- Manufacturer: Pullman-Standard
- Constructed: 1952
- Entered service: 1952–present
- Number built: 10
- Capacity: 68 dome seats 28 lounge seats
- Operators: Milwaukee Road; Canadian National; Amtrak; Via Rail; Various heritage railroads

The Super Dome was a Dome car built by Pullman-Standard for the Milwaukee Road in 1952. The ten Super Domes were the first full-length dome cars in revenue service, first operating on the Olympian Hiawatha and Twin Cities Hiawatha in late 1952. Although a mixed blessing in passenger use, the cars garnered much publicity for the Milwaukee Road and several remain in operation.

== Design ==
The first successful dome design in the United States was the "Vista Dome." The Chicago, Burlington and Quincy Railroad ("CB&Q") rebuilt a stainless steel Budd-built coach in their shops in Aurora, Illinois, with the Vista Dome design imagined and sketched by Cyrus Osborn. The dome area featured seats positioned lengthwise in the cabin facing double-pane windows which were designed to improve insulation. On July 23, 1945, the car was tested in the consist of the Twin Cities Zephyr. No fewer than five Budd-built domes would be found in each equipment set of the new California Zephyr when it debuted in 1949. Not to be outdone, Pullman delivered its first four domes, which it dubbed "Astra Liners", in 1947 for use on the Union Pacific Railroad.

The dome seating area in the Vista Dome was comparatively limited: 24, with an additional 46 standard seats on the lower level. In the early 1950s Pullman developed a "full-length" design, with the dome seating area stretching the length of the car. This design posed several challenges. The full-length glass roof (625-square-foot (58.1 m^{2})) necessitated a new, powerful air-conditioning system from a dedicated diesel motor. The massive weight of the car, 224,000 pounds (102,000 kg), required reinforced three-axle trucks from General Steel Castings. Much of this weight was concentrated in the glass dome, which meant new framing techniques to support the second level above the first. The result was an 80-foot (24 m)-long dome level which could seat 68, nearly three times that of the Vista Dome. The lounge area beneath seated 28 in booths.

== Service history ==
=== Milwaukee Road ===
The Milwaukee Road began taking delivery of the Super Domes in late 1952. They were numbered #50-#59. The name was chosen via an employee naming contest; rejected suggestions included Master Dome, Ultra Dome, and Panorama Dome. The domes were used on the daytime Twin Cities Hiawatha and the transcontinental Olympian Hiawatha. The Super Domes were the first and only cars on a daytime Hiawatha train built by a third party; all other Hiawatha equipment (such as the distinctive Beaver Tail and Skytop lounges) were built by the Milwaukee Road in its own shops.

The Super Domes were not a complete success in Milwaukee Road service. The heavy cars gave a rough ride, and the seats in the dome area gave an inferior view because they lay too low compared to the dome's supporting bulkheads. Still, the fame of having the first full-length dome car was good publicity for the railroad. After the discontinuance of the Olympian Hiawatha in 1961 Super Domes were seen on some of the services the Milwaukee Road operated with the Union Pacific, including the City of Denver. In 1964 the Milwaukee Road sold six of the domes to the Canadian National Railway, along with the sleeper-lounge Skytop Lounges. The remaining four domes continued on the Twin Cities Hiawatha.

=== Canadian National/VIA ===
The Canadian National Railway (CN) purchased six Super Domes from the Milwaukee Road in 1964. The CN dubbed these "Sceneramic" cars and placed them in service on the Super Continental. Via Rail inherited all six and used them into the early 1980s, when they were sold off to private owners.

=== Amtrak ===
Amtrak leased the Milwaukee Road's four remaining Super Domes on its inception in 1971, later purchasing them outright. They saw service on numerous routes, including the San Francisco Zephyr and Coast Starlight. Amtrak sold all four in the late 1970s. Amtrak acquired three cars from Tour Alaska in 1990 and operated them through 1995 on their Auto Train service. The North Carolina Department of Transportation acquired former No. 53 in 1996 and used it on the Piedmont before selling it in 2005.

== Preserved examples ==
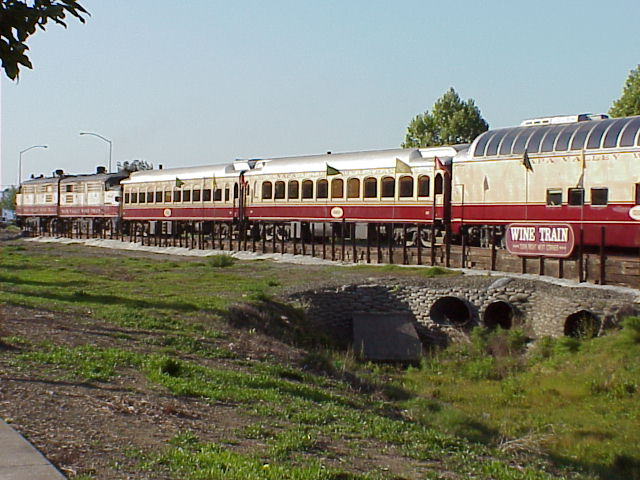
The Napa Valley Wine Train in Napa, California in 1999. The Super Dome is furthest right.

Several Super Domes remain in operation, mostly with heritage railways.

Superdomes #50 (the second to carry the number) and #56 currently operate for the Royal Gorge Route Railroad. They are now #50,"Oro Vista," and #56, "Rio Vista."

Superdome #51 has been privately stored by long-time manager of the Escanaba and Lake Superior Railroad, John Larkin, for several decades.

Another example is #52, which after decades on the Milwaukee, Canadian National, VIA Rail, and various private operators, has been part of the Napa Valley Wine Train since 1995 (although the company refers to it as a "Vista Dome").

The most notable Superdome in preservation is #53, which usually travels behind Milwaukee Road 261.

Superdome #54 had previously survived, however it was scrapped for parts by Tour Canada in 1983.

The Reading, Blue Mountain and Northern Railroad own both #55 and #59, numbered in their roster as #4 and #5 respectively.

Superdome #57 presently operates with Ontario Northland Railway as #900, "Otter Rapids."

After being sold to the Chehalis-Centralia Railroad & Museum, Superdome #58 was scrapped in 2009.
