= North Woods Hiawatha =

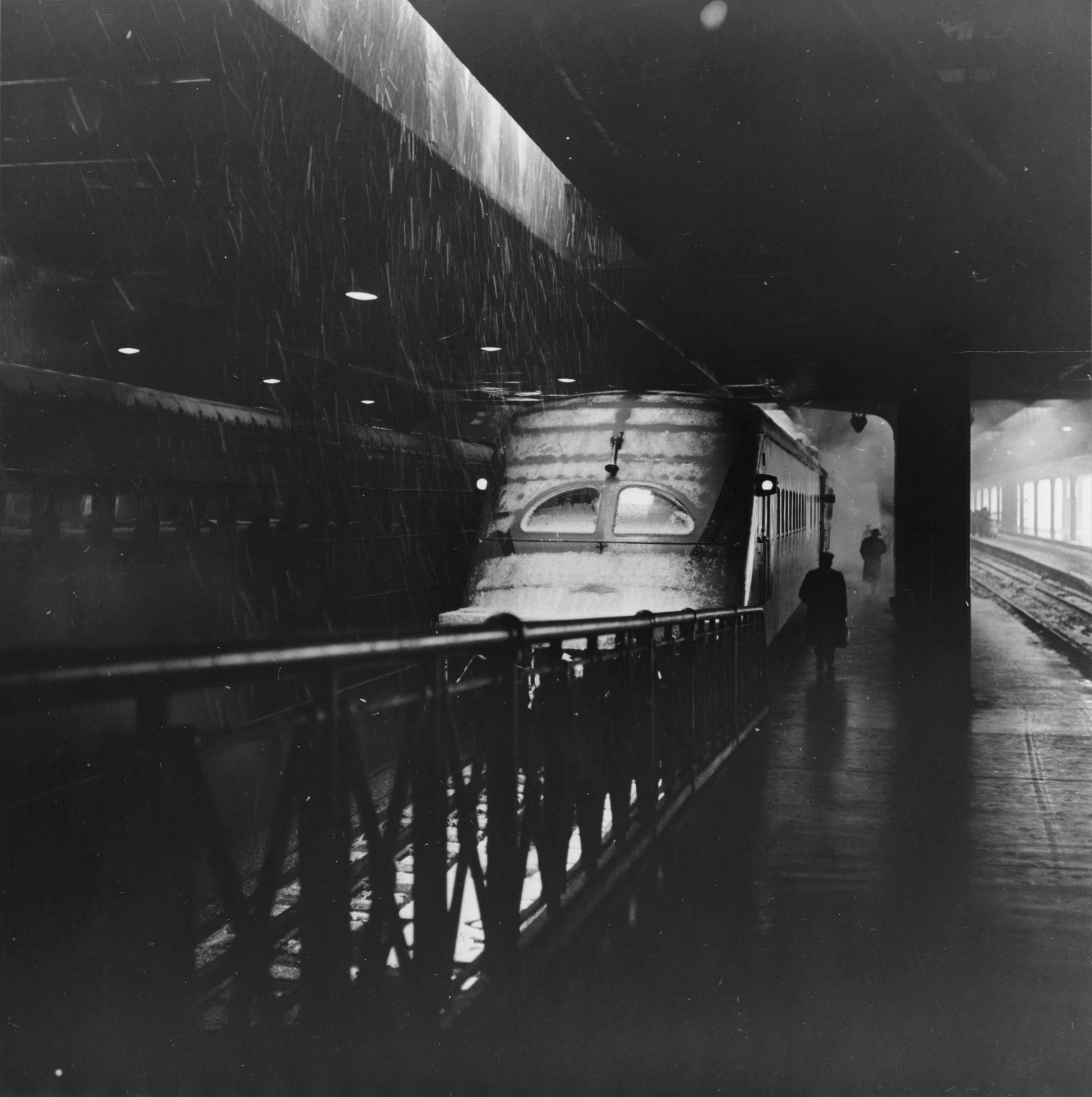
- "Beaver Tail" lounges such as these featured on the North Woods Hiawatha in the 1940s.

Overview
- First service: June 1936
- Last service: April 29, 1956
- Successor: Unnamed local services
- Former operator(s): Milwaukee Road

The North Woods Hiawatha was a streamlined passenger train operated by the Chicago, Milwaukee, St. Paul and Pacific Railroad ("Milwaukee Road") between New Lisbon and Minocqua, Wisconsin. It operated from 1936 until 1956. The North Woods Hiawatha was the first new route to adopt the Hiawatha brand.

== History ==
The Milwaukee Road's new flagship streamliner Hiawatha, which began running in 1935, made a stop in New Lisbon to permit connections with local trains heading north to Minocqua. This service competed directly with the Chicago and Northwestern Railway's own new streamliner, the 400, which stopped in Adams. Demand was such that on several June Saturdays the Milwaukee Road operated an additional train ("section") directly from Chicago to Minocqua via New Lisbon.

In June 1936 the Milwaukee Road introduced a new train between New Lisbon and Star Lake, Wisconsin, which it dubbed Hiawatha – North Woods Section. The train was pulled by a rebuilt Class G 4-6-0 steam locomotive, which had been shrouded to mimic the appearance of the faster Class As which pulled the Hiawatha. The 187-mile (301 km) route required 5 hours and 10 minutes to complete, owing to numerous online stops and a maximum track speed of 55 miles per hour (89 km/h). The train carried coaches, a lounge, and a dining car. This was the first use of the Hiawatha branding outside the Chicago–Twin Cities service.

In the fall of 1936 the Milwaukee Road dropped the Hiawatha branding and cut the train back from Star Lake to Minocqua. The Milwaukee Road relaunched the service in April 1937, adding a "Beaver Tail" parlor car displaced from the original Hiawatha and new coaches. The train was named the Hiawatha – North Woods Service. Beginning a pattern which lasted until 1943, service was extended to Star Lake in June and then cut back to Minocqua in the fall. In the summer of 1939 the Milwaukee Road began operating the train directly from Chicago again, departing 10 minutes ahead of the Afternoon Hiawatha. Through operation ended in the fall, only to return on the summer weekends in 1940. This pattern of operation continued, with minor variations, for the rest of the train's operation.

In the summer of 1951 the Milwaukee Road changed the train's name again, to North Woods Hiawatha. It continued to operate through from Chicago on summer weekends only. On April 29, 1956, the railroad cut the train back to Wausau, Wisconsin, with coaches only. It dropped the Hiawatha name at the same time. The truncated service ended altogether in 1970.
