= Twin Cities Hiawatha =

Former passenger train from Chicago to Minneapolis–Saint Paul

Hiawatha Twin Cities Hiawatha Morning Hiawatha Afternoon Hiawatha
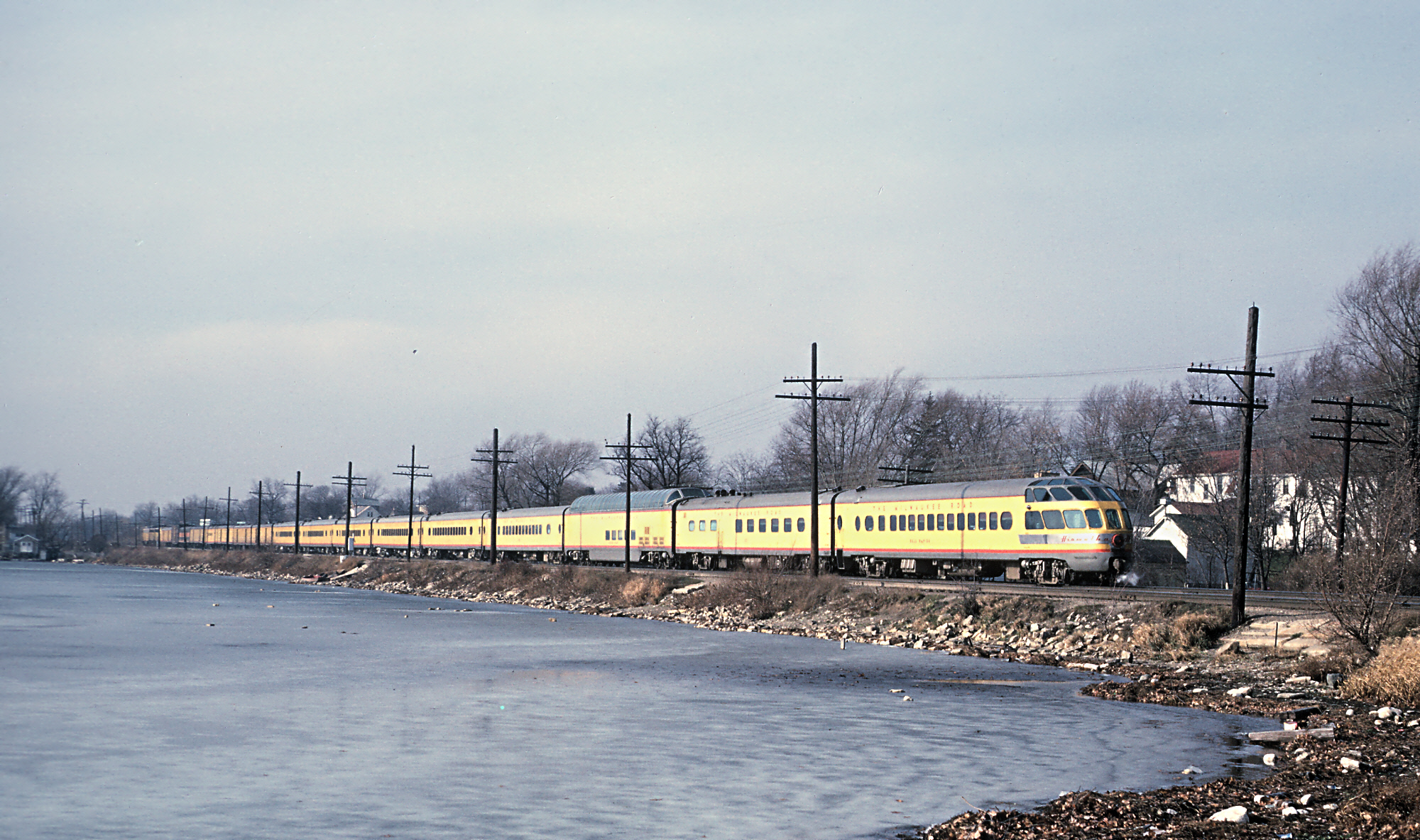
- The Morning Hiawatha in 1964

Overview
- Service type: Inter-city rail
- Status: Discontinued
- Locale: Midwestern United States
- First service: May 29, 1935
- Last service: April 30, 1971
- Successor: Borealis
- Former operator: Milwaukee Road

Route
- Termini: Chicago, Illinois; Minneapolis, Minnesota
- Distance travelled: 421 mi (678 km)
- Service frequency: Daily (1935-1939)
- Train numbers: 5–6 (Hiawatha, Morning Hiawatha); 100–101 (Afternoon Hiawatha)

Technical
- Track gauge: 1,435 mm (4 ft 8 1/2 in) standard gauge
- Operating speed: max: 112.5 to 125 mph (181.1 to 201.2 km/h)

The Twin Cities Hiawatha, often just Hiawatha, was a named passenger train operated by the Chicago, Milwaukee, St. Paul and Pacific Railroad (also known as the Milwaukee Road), and traveled from Chicago to the Twin Cities. The original train takes its name from the epic poem The Song of Hiawatha by Henry Wadsworth Longfellow. There are a number of Hiawatha-themed names within the city of Minneapolis, the terminus of the original train. The first Hiawatha ran in 1935; in 1939 the Milwaukee Road introduced a second daily trip between Chicago and Minneapolis. The two trains were known as the Morning Hiawatha and Afternoon Hiawatha, or sometimes the AM Twin Cities Hiawatha and PM Twin Cities Hiawatha. The Milwaukee Road discontinued the Afternoon Hiawatha in 1970 while the Morning Hiawatha continued running until the formation of Amtrak in 1971.

== History ==
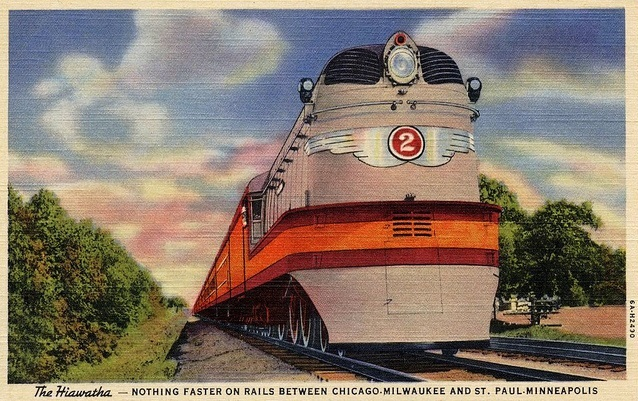
A postcard depicts the distinctive original Class A in 1935.

In the 1930s three railroads fiercely competed for daytime passengers on the Chicago–Minneapolis/St. Paul corridor: the Milwaukee Road, the Chicago, Burlington and Quincy Railroad (the Burlington), and the Chicago and North Western Railway (C&NW). (Note: Chicago-Twin Cities service was also provided by the Chicago Great Western, Soo Line, and Rock Island railroads. These railways did not attempt to challenge the end-to-end speeds of the Burlington, Milwaukee, and C&NW.) Each managed the roughly 400-mile (640 km) trip between the two cities in 10 hours, at an average speed of 40 miles per hour (64 km/h). In 1934 each of the railroads committed to introducing new services which would reduce the travel time to 6½ hours to St. Paul. The Burlington introduced the Twin Cities Zephyr, a diesel-powered streamlined trainset, while the C&NW's Twin Cities 400 used refurbished steam locomotives and conventional passenger equipment. The Milwaukee Road ordered new steam locomotives from American Locomotive Company and constructed new passenger cars in its own shops. All three trains entered service in 1935.

The first Hiawatha ran between Chicago and the Twin Cities on May 29, 1935, on a daily 6½ hour schedule over the 410 miles (660 km) to St. Paul. The four new class A locomotives had streamlining by Otto Kuhler, were oil-fired to reduce servicing time en route, and were some of the fastest steam engines ever built, capable of powering their five-car trains at sustained speeds more than 100 mph (160 km/h). Patronage was good and the consist grew from five cars to as many as nine.

In October 1936 the Milwaukee Road re-equipped the Hiawatha with new "1937" Hiawatha trains, improving on the 1935 design. They had a baggage-‘Tip Top Tap’ car, four coaches, a dining car, and three parlor cars, including a new Beaver Tail parlor-observation car. The new cars featured fluted sides, in contrast to the smooth sides of the 1935 edition. The regular consist was nine cars.

In September 1938 the train was re-equipped again with the "1939" Hiawatha with its famous finned Beaver Tail observation car, designed by noted industrial designer Otto Kuhler. Kuhler also styled the new Class F7 4-6-4 “Hudsons” which displaced the Class As.

=== Two Hiawathas ===
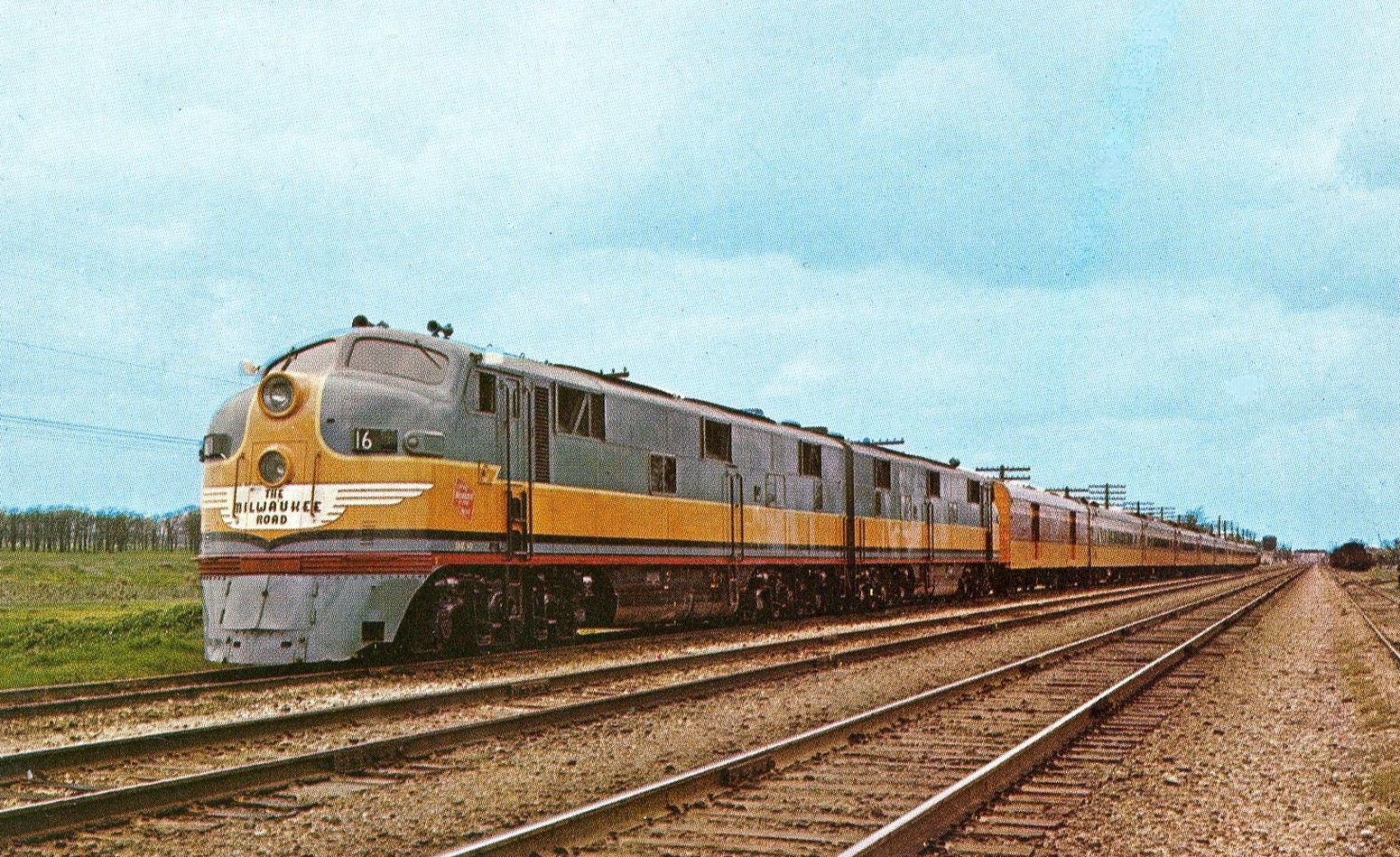
The Afternoon Hiawatha in 1956

From January 21, 1939, the Twin Cities Hiawatha became two trains: the Morning Hiawatha (trains 5 and 6), and the Afternoon Hiawatha (trains 100 and 101). With the delivery of the 1939 trainsets, the original 1935 Hiawatha equipment was reassigned to the Chicago to Omaha/Sioux City route where it ran as the Midwest Hiawatha. Another train, The North Woods Hiawatha, ran with older cars from earlier series also.

In June 1941 the two afternoon trains were scheduled for six hours fifteen minutes between Chicago and St. Paul and another half hour to Minneapolis; the eastward morning train took five minutes more, and the westward made more stops and was scheduled for eight hours fifteen minutes to Minneapolis.

Two sets of passenger diesel locomotives appeared in 1941: a back to back pair of Alco/GE DL-107 locomotives, the #14, and a back to back pair of EMD E-6, the #15. The Twin Cities Hiawatha was partially equipped in May 1942 with coaches, two diners, and two 'Tip Top Tap' cars which ran with the 1939 Beaver Tails and parlors. Older series of cars were modified with skirting to run with the newer consists. During the following War years, the trains had as many as 15 cars, and one of the 1942 cars painted in patriotic red, white & blue proclaiming "Buy War Bonds". Labor day 1942 trains were so full that people had to sit on suitcases or stand in aisles. One train had 625 passengers in ten cars and three parlor cars.

In 1947–1948 the Milwaukee Road again re-equipped its major passenger routes with new lightweight cars. The new Morning Hiawatha and Afternoon Hiawatha were inaugurated with diesel-powered trains designed by Brooks Stevens. The new trains included the Skytop parlor observation cars. These four cars had a drawing room and swiveling parlor seats, and at the rear there was a lounge area with an expanse of windows. (One of these cars, #186 Cedar Rapids has been restored and is owned by a Minneapolis-based organization that operates the Milwaukee Road 261 steam locomotive.) The new trains made their debut on May 29, 1948, the thirteenth anniversary of the first Hiawatha.

In 1952 the Milwaukee Road took delivery of ten "Super Dome" cars. Six were assigned to the Olympian Hiawatha and two each to the Morning and Afternoon Hiawathas. Both trains had coaches, a Super Dome lounge car, dining car (sometimes a Tip Top Tap car), Valley-series parlor cars, and the distinctive Skytop lounge observation car. Starting in 1955, with the Milwaukee Road handling the Union Pacific "Cities" trains between Chicago and Omaha, passenger equipment was painted in the Union Pacific armour yellow and harbor-mist grey with red Scotchlite striping. The rest of the fleet was painted this way, except for the heavyweight commuter cars in Chicago.

On July 18, 1960, the eastbound Afternoon Hiawatha struck a truck in the crossing in Newport, Minnesota, and derailed. Dozens of passengers on the train to Chicago suffered minor injuries, but only ten were hospitalized overnight.

The Afternoon Hiawatha ended on January 23, 1970. The Morning Hiawatha continued until the formation of Amtrak, making its last run on April 30, 1971. Amtrak retained a single Chicago-Minneapolis frequency with the Burlington Northern's Empire Builder, which was re-routed over the Milwaukee Road's line through Milwaukee to St. Paul.

Amtrak has operated the Chicago–Seattle Empire Builder over the former Twin Cities Hiawatha routing since May 1971. From November 1971 to April 1985, a series of other trains also served the routing, providing a second daily round trip at most times. Amtrak briefly reused the Twin Cities Hiawatha name for a Chicago-Minneapolis service from January 16 to June 12, 1972, and October 30, 1977, to April 30, 1978. The corridor only had the Empire Builder until May 21, 2024, when the daily Chicago–St. Paul Borealis began operation.

== Route ==
The Twin Cities Hiawatha ran on the railroad's main line from Chicago and Milwaukee to St. Paul and Minneapolis. Originally only five intermediate stops were made between Milwaukee and St. Paul. Later other stops were added, as well as Glenview, Illinois, between Chicago and Milwaukee. When the Hiawatha began in 1935 about half the line had cab signaling that lit white, green, or red lights in the locomotive cab. A whistle would sound if the red signal came on.

The current route, consisting of five subdivisions, is now owned by the Soo Line Railroad, an in-name-only division of the Canadian Pacific Railway.

- C&M Subdivision – Chicago to Milwaukee
- Watertown Subdivision – Milwaukee to Portage, Wisconsin
- Tomah Subdivision – Portage to La Crosse, Wisconsin
- River Subdivision (Canadian Pacific Railway) – La Crosse to St. Paul
- Merriam Park Subdivision – St. Paul to Minneapolis "Short Line"

The current Amtrak Empire Builder in the Chicago to St. Paul portion and the entirety of the Amtrak Borealis follow this route.
