= Beaver Tail (railcar) =

Type of railcar

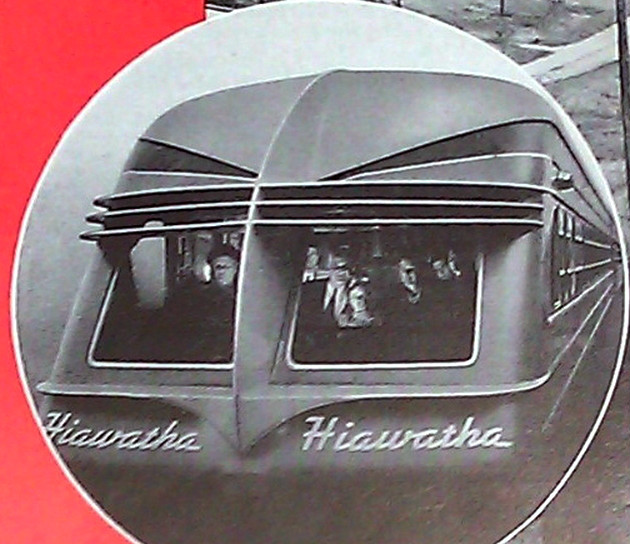
- An advertisement depicts a third-generation Beaver Tail car on the rear of the Midwest Hiawatha in the 1940s.

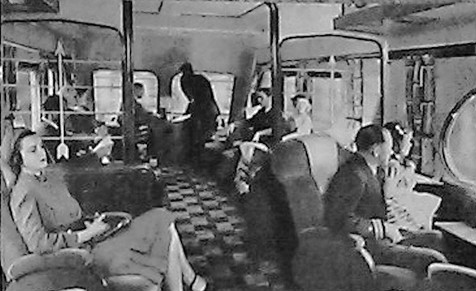
- The interior of a Beaver Tail on the Midwest Hiawatha.
- In service: 1935–1961
- Manufacturer: Milwaukee Road
- Constructed: 1934–1938
- Number built: 8

The Beaver Tails were a fleet of streamlined parlor-observation passenger cars built by the Chicago, Milwaukee, St. Paul and Pacific Railroad ("the Milwaukee Road") between 1934–1938. They served as the observation cars on the famous Hiawatha trains from 1935 until 1948, when they were displaced by the new Skytop Lounge. The cars' name was derived from the distinctive flat, sloped rear of the car.

== Design ==
The Beaver Tails were constructed in three distinct batches, corresponding to the introduction of the Hiawatha in 1934 and its first two reequippings in 1936 and 1938. In total eight cars were built, all in the Milwaukee Road's own shops. The first generation seated 24 in the rear area, plus separate men's and women's lounges. In the 1936 edition the lounges were replaced by "small toilet rooms"; there was lounge-style seating for 26 plus seating for 12 in the rear (dubbed the "solarium"). The final version (pictured at right), built in 1938, was designed by the renowned Otto Kuhler. While retaining most aspects of the original design, Kuhler added ribbing along the sides and fins in the back. In another innovation Kuhler added an exterior-facing sofa to the solarium portion of the car. Seating capacity increased to 28 in the lounge area and 17 in the solarium.

The cars, like the rest of the Hiawatha equipment set, were painted in orange, maroon, and gray. The name derived from the distinctive flat, sloped rear of the car. The Milwaukee Road coined the name itself and used it in publicity beginning in February 1935, three months before the Hiawatha debuted.

== Service history ==
The first two Beaver Tail cars, the Nokomis and Wenonah, entered service on the original Hiawatha in 1935. On the re-equipping of the Hiawatha in 1936 they moved to the North Woods Hiawatha, and then finally to the Chippewa-Hiawatha in 1938. The Milwaukee Road removed the Beaver Tails in September 1951; the two cars were converted to storage cars the following year.

The second two cars, the Omeme and Opeche, were completed in 1936 and entered service on the Hiawatha. Like the cars they displaced, they were replaced after two years when in 1938 the Hiawathas were again reequipped. The cars later saw service on the Midwest Hiawatha before being retired in 1952.

The third and final batch comprised four cars: the Earling, Merrill, Miller, and Mitchell. The four cars were introduced with a second daily Hiawatha between Chicago and the Twin Cities, leading to the creation of the Morning and Afternoon Hiawathas. After the arrival of the Skytop Lounges in 1948 the Beaver Tails saw service on the Midwest Hiawatha and Chippewa-Hiawatha. All were out of service by 1961.
