= Milwaukee Road class F7 =

Class of 6 streamlined 4-6-4 steam locomotives

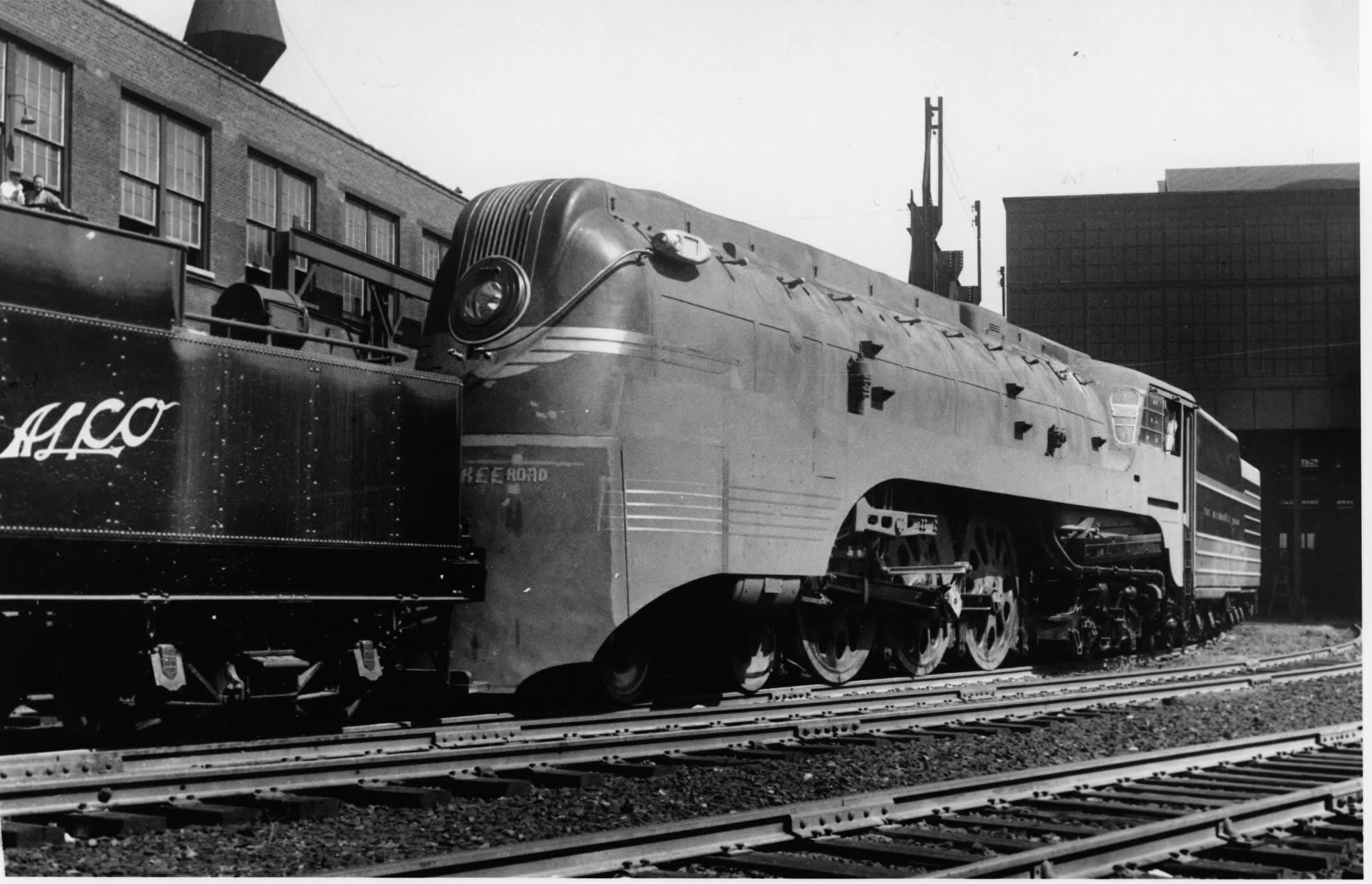
- A class F7 being moved out of the Alco factory
Type and origin
- Power type: Steam
- Builder: American Locomotive Company
- Serial number: 69064–69069
- Build date: August to September 1938
- Total produced: 6
Specifications
- Configuration
  - Whyte: 4-6-4
- Gauge: 4 ft 8 1/2 in (1,435 mm) standard gauge
- Leading dia.: 36 in (914 mm)
- Driver dia.: 84 in (2,134 mm)
- Trailing dia.: 38 and 44 in (965 and 1,118 mm)
- Wheelbase: Loco & tender: 89 ft 10 in (27.38 m)
- Length: 100 ft 0 in (30.48 m)
- Axle load: 72,250 lb (32,770 kilograms; 32.77 metric tons)
- Adhesive weight: 216,000 lb (98,000 kilograms; 98 metric tons)
- Loco weight: 415,000 lb (188,000 kilograms; 188 metric tons)
- Total weight: 791,000 lb (359,000 kilograms; 359 metric tons) full
- Fuel type: Coal
- Fuel capacity: 50,000 lb (23,000 kilograms; 23 metric tons)
- Water cap.: 20,000 US gal (75,700 L; 16,700 imp gal)
- Firebox
  - Grate area: 96.5 sq ft (8.97 m^{2})
- Boiler pressure: 300 lbf/in^{2} (2.07 MPa)
- Heating surface: 4,166 sq ft (387.0 m^{2})
- Superheater
  - Type: Type E
  - Heating area: 1,695 sq ft (157.5 m^{2})
- Cylinders: Two, outside
- Cylinder size: 23 1/2 in × 30 in (597 mm × 762 mm)
Performance figures
- Maximum speed: 120 mph (193 km/h)
- Tractive effort: 50,294 lbf (223.72 kN)
- Factor of adh.: 4.29
Career
- Operators: Milwaukee Road
- Numbers: 100–105
- Retired: November 1949 to August 1951
- Disposition: All scrapped

The Milwaukee Road's class "F7" comprised six (#100–#105) high-speed, streamlined 4-6-4 "Baltic" (Hudson) type steam locomotives built by the American Locomotive Company (ALCO) in 1937–38 to haul the Milwaukee's Hiawatha express passenger trains. Following on from the success of the road's class "A" 4-4-2s, the F7s allowed the road to haul heavier trains on the popular Chicago–Twin Cities routes.

The F7s are major contenders for the fastest steam locomotives ever built, as they ran at over 100 miles per hour (160 km/h) daily. One run in January 1941 recorded by a reporter for Trains magazine saw 110 miles per hour (180 km/h) achieved twice—in the midst of a heavy snowstorm. Baron Gérard Vuillet, a French railroading expert, once recorded a run between Chicago and Milwaukee where the locomotive reached 125 mph (201 km/h) and sustained an average 120 mph (190 km/h) for 4.5 miles (7.2 km). However, the British locomotive LNER Class A4 4468 Mallard is officially accepted to be the world's fastest, with a run recorded at 125.88 mph (202.58 km/h) but authenticated at 126 mph in 1938.

The Milwaukee F7s are accepted as the fastest steam locomotives by a different measure—scheduled speed between stations. In 1939, shortly after they were introduced into passenger service, the Twin Cities Hiawatha schedule was modified such that the engines would need to run the 78.3 mi (126.0 km) between Portage and Sparta, Wisconsin in 58 minutes—a start-to-stop average of 81 mph (130 km/h).

In the late 1940s, the Milwaukee F7s were modified to equip an additional Mars Light above the original single highlight to further enhance the safety of daily highspeed operation.

On July 27, 1950, F7 #102 was on a run between Chicago and Milwaukee on the "North Woods Hiawatha." 73 mi (117 km) from Milwaukee, the right main crosshead froze in its guide. It immediately overheated, broke, and dropped from the guide while the train was traveling at an estimated speed between 90 mph (140 km/h) and over 100 mph (160 km/h). Air brake lines were severed, putting the engine into emergency. The engine was severely damaged, the broken drive gear tore up ties and roadbed, and debris (including the main rod) was found as far as 1,400 ft (430 m) west of Edgebrook Station.

Information is conflicting on the number of injuries: Some report that two railroad employees were injured, while another report stated that as the locomotive passed by the Devon Avenue crossing an automobile driver was injured by flying debris. Regardless, no one was killed. The train stayed on the rails, and continued over 10,560 ft (3,220 m) from the station until stopping completely. The incident was later found to have been caused by the failure of a connection link between the valve gear's combination lever and a Nathan mechanical lubricator. In fact, both of the locomotive's crossheads had been running dry on lubrication, but the right one was the first to fail. After this incident, #102 never ran again, as the cost was not considered worth repairs.

The first one built, #100, was also the first withdrawn from service, on November 10, 1949, and the last one built #105 was the last in service and withdrawn August 10, 1951 and scrapped shortly after.

Table of locomotives
Milwaukee Road No.	Alco serial No.	Built	Retired
100	69064	August 1938	November 1949
101	69065	August 1938	April 1951
102	69066	August 1938	August 1950
103	69067	August 1938	June 1951
104	69068	September 1938	June 1951
105	69069	September 1938	August 1951

== See also ==
- Chicago and North Western class E-4 - nine very similar 4-6-4 type locomotives built for the Milwaukee's Chicago competitor, the Chicago and North Western Railway.
- AT&SF class 3460 - six similar 4-6-4 type locomotives with the same boiler pressure and driving wheel size, also used in Chicago by the Santa Fe Railway.
