= Milwaukee Road class A =

Type of high-speed streamlined steam locomotive

Milwaukee Road Class A
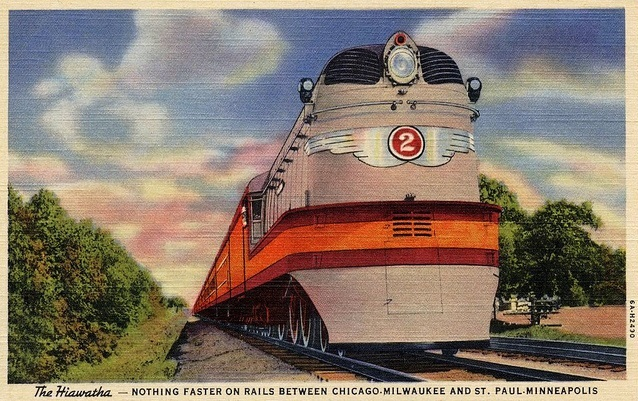
- A postcard depicts the Milwaukee Road class A #2 in 1935.
Type and origin
- Builder: American Locomotive Company
- Serial number: 68684 (1), 68685 (2), 68729 (3), 68828 (4)
- Build date: May 1935 (2), May 1936, April 1937
- Total produced: 4
Specifications
- Configuration
  - Whyte: 4-4-2
  - UIC: 2′B1′ h2
- Gauge: 4 ft 8 1/2 in (1,435 mm) standard gauge
- Driver dia.: 84 in (2,134 mm)
- Length: 88 ft 8 in (27.03 m)
- Height: 14 ft 4 in (4.37 m)
- Adhesive weight: 144,500 lb (65,500 kilograms; 65.5 metric tons)
- Total weight: 537,000 lb (244,000 kilograms; 244 metric tons)
- Fuel type: Oil
- Fuel capacity: 4,000 US gal (15,000 L; 3,300 imp gal)
- Water cap.: 13,000 US gal (49,000 L; 11,000 imp gal)
- Boiler pressure: 300 psi (2.07 MPa)
- Heating surface
  - Firebox: 69 sq ft (6.4 m^{2})
  - Total surface: 3,245 sq ft (301.5 m^{2})
- Superheater
  - Heating area: 1,029 sq ft (95.6 m^{2})
- Cylinders: Two
- Cylinder size: 19 in × 28 in (483 mm × 711 mm)
Performance figures
- Maximum speed: 112.5 mph (181 km/h)
- Tractive effort: 30,685 lbf (136.49 kN)
- Factor of adh.: 4.71
Career
- Operators: Milwaukee Road
- Class: A
- Numbers: 1 – 4
- Retired: 1949–1951
- Disposition: All scrapped

The Milwaukee Road Class "A" was a class of high-speed, streamlined 4-4-2 "Atlantic" type steam locomotives built by the American Locomotive Company (ALCO) from 1935 to 1937 to haul the Milwaukee Road's Hiawatha express passenger trains. Numbered from No. 1 to No. 4, they were among the last Atlantic type locomotives built in the United States as well as the largest and most powerful. The class were the first locomotives built for regular operation over 100 mph (160 km/h), and the first class built completely streamlined, which they kept their entire lives. Although partially supplanted by the larger class F7 Hudsons from 1937, they remained in premiere service until the end. Locomotive No. 3 was withdrawn in 1949 and cannibalized for spare parts to keep the other three running until 1951.

== History ==
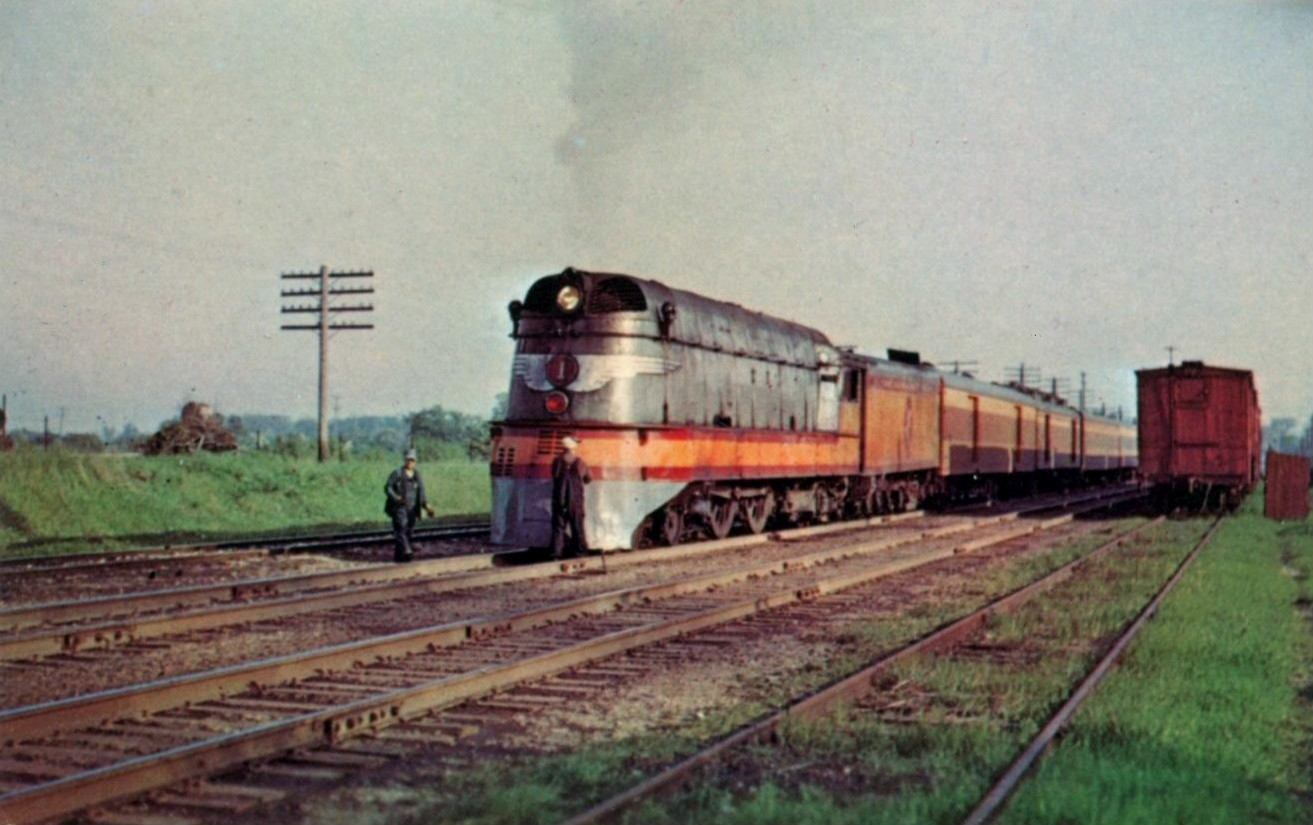
Milwaukee Road class A No. 1 pauses near Milwaukee in 1951.

Designed for a 6 1/2 hour schedule between Chicago and St. Paul, the class proved capable of handling nine cars on a 6 1/4 hour schedule. The only change was the addition of a Mars Light beneath the winged emblem on the nose in 1947.

They hauled the fastest scheduled steam-powered trains in the world. Running at 100 mph (160 km/h) or greater was required to keep these schedules; the class was designed to cruise at over 100 mph and be able to achieve 120 mph (190 km/h). A run with a dynamometer car behind the locomotive was made on May 15, 1935, by locomotive No. 2 between Milwaukee and New Lisbon, Wisconsin. Over a 14-mile (23 km) stretch the speed of 112.5 mph (181.1 km/h) was recorded. This was the fastest authenticated speed reached by a steam locomotive at the time, making No. 2 the record holder for steam traction speed and the first steam locomotive to top 110 mph (180 km/h). There are reports that these locomotives could exceed 120 miles per hour (190 km/h). Such speeds would have put the class A in contention with the LNER Class A4 and German BR 05 for the title of fastest steam locomotive until that time, but no official records have been recovered. The successor Milwaukee Road class F7 was even more powerful, with a claimed top speed of 125 mph (201 km/h).

The design was fairly conventional but unusual in some aspects. One goal was reducing reciprocating mass, which could not be completely balanced. This was the reason for the high boiler pressure of 300 psi (2.07 MPa), which allowed smaller pistons. The reciprocating mass of the connecting rods was also reduced with the use of four driving wheels rather than six. The main rods connected to the first pair of driven wheels rather than the (more conventional) second; again, this reduced the reciprocating mass as well as providing more even power throughout the stroke. The large 84-inch (2.134 m) diameter driving wheels reduced piston speed and made high speed less taxing on the machinery. The streamlined casings were designed to open easily for servicing; the front end had clamshell doors ahead of the smokebox.

Table of locomotive
Milwaukee Road no.	Alco serial no.	Built	Retired
1	68684	May 1935	November 1951
2	68685	May 1935	November 1951
3	68729	May 1936	September 1949
4	68828	April 1937	June 1951
