= List of Milwaukee Road locomotives =

These are locomotives of the Chicago, Milwaukee, St. Paul and Pacific Railroad, often referred to as the "Milwaukee Road". The Milwaukee was acquired by the Soo Line in 1985 and the Soo subsequently became part of the Canadian Pacific Railway.

Steam	Class A (4-4-2), B (4-6-0), C (2-8-0), F (4-6-2, 4-6-4), G (4-6-0), H (4-4-0), I (0-6-0), J (0-4-0), K (2-6-2), L (2-8-2), M (2-6-0), N (2-6-6-2), S (4-8-4), X (Shays)
Diesel	ALCO, Baldwin, Davenport, EMD (Switchers, Cab units, Hood units), Fairbanks-Morse, General Electric, Whitcomb
Electric	Switchers, Passenger, Freight
Rebuilds	EMD

== Steam ==
Milwaukee Road steam locomotives were organized into classes by wheel arrangement. Additional suffixes, where used indicated:

- s: fitted with a superheater (where the class was not fitted from new)
- r: fitted with a mechanical stoker (where the class was not fitted from new)

=== Class A: 4-4-2 ===
Class A was the 4-4-2 type.

Image	Class	Quantity	Builder	Built	Retired	Cylinders (bore × stroke)		Driver diameter		Boiler pressure		Tractive effort		Notes
	Class	Quantity	Builder	Built	Retired	in	mm	in	m	psi	MPa	lbf	kN	Notes
	A1	18	BLW	1896–1903	1934–1948	13 × 26; 22 × 26	330×660; 559×660	78	1.981	200	1.38	C:15,577; S:20,250	C:69.29; S:90.08	Vauclain compound, all rebuilt simple 1921–1922 as class A1-a. Eleven superheated 1925–1929 as class A1-as.
	A1-as	11	Milwaukee Road	1925–1929 (rebuilt)	1934–1948	19 × 26	483×660	79	2.007	200	1.38	20,197	89.84	Simple
	A2	9	BLW	1901	1927–1929	15 × 28; 25 × 28	381×711; 635×711	84	2.134	200	1.38	20,420	90.83	Vauclain compound
	A2-a	19	BLW	1902–1903	1927–1929	15 × 28; 25 × 28	381×711; 635×711	84	2.134	200	1.38	20,420	90.83	Vauclain compound
	A2-b	5	Milwaukee Road	1907–1908	1927–1929	15 × 28; 25 × 28	381×711; 635×711	85	2.159	220	1.52	22,190	98.71	Compound
	A2-c	12	BLW	1908–1909	1928–1930	15 × 28; 25 × 28	381×711; 635×711	85	2.159	220	1.52	22,190	98.71	Vauclain compound
	A2	2	BLW 31274, 31275	1907	1951	15 × 28; 25 × 28	381×711; 635×711	85	2.159	220	1.52	22,200	98.75	Balanced compound, rebuilt simple as class A4-s
	A4-s	2	Milwaukee Road	(rebuilt)	1951	22 × 28	559×711	79	2.007	200	1.38	29,160	129.71	
	A3-s	1	BLW 33778	1909	1951	22 × 28	559×711	73	1.854			25,240	112.27	Acquired with Idaho and Washington Northern Railroad. Rebuilt as class A4-as
	A4-as	1	Milwaukee Road	(rebuilt)	1951	22 × 28	559×711	79	2.007	200	1.38	29,162	129.72	
	A	4	Alco	1935–1937	1949–1951	19 × 28	483×711	84	2.134	300	2.07	30,685	136.49	Streamlined

=== Class B: 4-6-0 ===
Class B was for Vauclain compound 4-6-0s built by Baldwin Locomotive Works. Most were rebuilt as simple engines, those not rebuilt were scrapped in the late 1920s.

Image	Class	Quantity	Builder	Built	Retired	Cylinders (bore × stroke)		Driver diameter		Boiler pressure		Tractive effort		Notes
	Class	Quantity	Builder	Built	Retired	in	mm	in	m	psi	MPa	lbf	kN	Notes
	B	1	BLW	1892	1914	12 × 26; 20 × 26	305×660; 508×660	62	1.575	190	1.31	15,600	69.39	Rebuilt to class G5-xs
	B1	14	BLW	1895–1897	1913–1915	12 1/2 × 26; 21 × 26	318×660; 533×660	62	1.575	200	1.38	C:17,950; S:21,540	C:79.85; S:95.81	All rebuilt to class G5-s
	B2	37	BLW	1897–1899	1914–1925	13 1/2× 26; 23 × 26	343×660; 584×660	62	1.575	200	1.38	C:20,944; S:25,500	C:93.16; S:113.43	19 rebuilt to class G6-fs, 18 rebuilt to class G6-m
	B2	7	BLW	1900	1915–1924	13 1/2× 26; 23 × 26	343×660; 584×660	62	1.575	200	1.38	21,250	94.52	3 rebuilt to class G6-gs, 4 rebuilt to G6-n
	B3-x	1	BLW	1899	1927	14 × 30; 24 × 30	256×762; 610×762	68	1.727	200	1.38	24,200	107.65	Scrapped
	B3	25	BLW	1900	1915–1927	15 × 26; 25 × 26	381×660; 635×660	68	1.727	200	1.38	C:23,079; S:28,080	C:102.66; S:124.91	9 rebuilt to class G6-s, 4 rebuilt to class G6-os, 12 rebuilt to class G6-ps.
	B4-x	1	BLW	1899	1927	15 × 30; 25 × 30	381×762; 635×762	69	1.753	200	1.38	26,630	118.46	Scrapped
	B4	16	BLW	1900	1921–1927	15 × 30; 25 × 30	381×762; 635×762	69	1.753	200	1.38	C:26,630; S:31,956	C:118.46; S:142.15	Narrow firebox. 10 rebuilt to class G7-as, 6 scrapped
	B4	66	BLW	1901–1903	1915–1925	15 × 28; 25 × 28	381×711; 635×711	63	1.600	200	1.38	C:27,222; S:32,666	C:121.09; S:145.31	Wide firebox. 20 rebuilt to class G7-bs, 4 rebuilt to class G7-cs, 25 rebuilt to class G8, 17 rebuilt to class G8-a,

=== Class C: 2-8-0 ===
Class C was the 2-8-0 type.

Image	Class	Quantity	Builder	Built	Retired	Cylinders (bore × stroke)		Driver diameter		Boiler pressure		Tractive effort		Notes
	Class	Quantity	Builder	Built	Retired	in	mm	in	m	psi	MPa	lbf	kN	Notes
	C1-a	2	BLW 19400–19401	1901	1934–1935	22 × 28	559×711	55	1.397	200	1.38	41,888	186.33	
	C1-b	2	BLW 19398–19399	1901	1934–1940	22 × 28	559×711	56	1.422	200	1.38	41,140	183.00	Later class C1-c
	C1-c	65	Milwaukee Road	1904–1907	1934–1949	22 × 28	559×711	55	1.397	200	1.38	41,890	186.34	
	C1-d	10	Alco-Rogers	1908–1909	1934–1936	22 × 28	559×711	57	1.448	190	1.31	38,391	170.77	Acquired with Chicago, Terre Haute & Southeastern Railroad
	C1-e	5	Alco-Brooks	1905	1934–1936	19 1/2 × 28	495×711	57	1.448	200	1.38	31,754	141.25	Acquired with Chicago, Milwaukee & Gary Railroad; né Detroit Southern Railroad
	C1-f	2	BLW 32441–32442	1907	1934	21 × 28	533×711	55	1.397	200	1.38	38,166	169.77	Acquired with Chicago, Milwaukee & Gary Railroad
	C1-g	2	BLW 35425–35426	1910	1934	21 × 28	533×711	55	1.397	200	1.38	38,166	169.77	Acquired with Chicago, Milwaukee & Gary Railroad
	C2	75	Milwaukee Road (25); BLW (50)	1909–1910	1936–1965	23 × 30	584×762	63	1.600	200	1.38	42,820	190.47	
	C3	2	BLW 32176, 32208	1907	1935	22 × 28	559×711	51	1.295	200	1.38	45,170	200.93	Acquired with Idaho and Washington Northern Railroad
	C3-a	4	BLW	1910–1911	1934–1951	22 × 30	559×762	55	1.397	200	1.38	44,880	199.64	Acquired with Idaho and Washington Northern Railroad
	C3-b	5	Alco-Rogers	1909	1945–1949	22 × 30	559×762	57	1.448	200	1.38	43,300	192.61	
	C4	1	BLW 24742	1904	1927	20 × 24	508×610	49	1.245					Acquired with Montana Railroad
	C5	5	Milwaukee Road	1912	1951–1954	24 × 30	610×762	63	1.600	185	1.28	43,130	191.85	
	C5-a	45	Alco-Brooks (35); Milwaukee Road (10)	1912–13	1945–1954	24 × 30	610×762	63	1.600	185	1.28	43,130	191.85	
	C7	5	Alco-Schen	1910	1950–1953	25 × 32	635×813	61	1.549	180	1.24	50,163	223.14	Acquired with Chicago, Terre Haute & Southeastern Railroad
	C7-a	12	Alco-Schen	1912–1918	1950–1953	25 × 32	635×813	61	1.549	180	1.24	50,163	223.14	Acquired with Chicago, Terre Haute & Southeastern Railroad
	C9-a	1	Pittsburgh	1901	1921	19 × 24	483×610	50	1.270					Acquired with Tacoma Eastern Railroad
	C9-b	1	BLW 5943	1881	1929	20 × 24	508×610	50	1.270	150	1.03	24,480	108.89	Acquired with Bellingham Bay and British Columbia Railroad
	C9-c	1	BLW 13800	1893	1929	19 × 24	483×610	50	1.270	150	1.03	26,511	117.93	Acquired with Bellingham Bay and British Columbia Railroad
	C9-d	1	BLW 24742	1904	1927	20 × 24	508×610	54	1.372					Acquired with Bellingham Bay and British Columbia Railroad
	C9-d	1	BLW 13800	1906	1935	22 × 28	559×711	50	1.270	200	1.38	46,076	204.96	Acquired with Tacoma Eastern Railroad

=== Class D: 0-8-0 ===
Class D was the 0-8-0 type.

Image	Class	Quantity	Builder	Built	Retired	Cylinders (bore × stroke)		Driver diameter		Boiler pressure		Tractive effort		Notes
	Class	Quantity	Builder	Built	Retired	in	mm	in	m	psi	MPa	lbf	kN	Notes
	D1	2	BLW 39758–39759	1913	1952	20 × 26	508×660	51	1.295	200	1.38	34,666	154.20	Acquired with Chicago, Terre Haute & Southeastern Railroad

=== Class E ===
Class E was reserved for the electric locomotives.

=== Class F: 4-6-2 and 4-6-4 ===
Class F covered the 4-6-2 and 4-6-4 types.

Image	Class	Quantity	Builder	Built	Retired	Cylinders (bore × stroke)		Driver diameter		Boiler pressure		Tractive effort		Notes
	Class	Quantity	Builder	Built	Retired	in	mm	in	m	psi	MPa	lbf	kN	Notes
	F1 (1st) 4-6-2	1	Schenectady 2855	1889	1926	19 × 24	483×610	68	1.727	180	1.24	19,490	86.70	Rebuild to G4-g class 4-6-0
	F2 4-6-2	1	Milwaukee Road	1905	1929	23 × 26	584×660	72	1.829	200	1.38	34,470	153.33	
	F3 4-6-2	70	Alco-Brooks 47442–47491, 48714–47433	1910	1929–1954	23 × 28	584×711	79	2.007	200	1.38	31,870	141.76	All rebuilt to F3-s, F3-as or F3-bs. Two streamlined as F1 (second). One streamlined as F3 (second)
	F4 4-6-2	70	Milwaukee Road	1910	1916–1954	23 × 28	584×711	69	1.753	200	1.38	36,490	162.32	All rebuilt to F4-b (2), F4-ms (17) or F5-bs (6).
	F5 4-6-2	65 (+6)	Milwaukee Road (15 new, 6 rebuilt from F4); Alco-Brooks (50) 51134–51163, 51328–51347	1911–1912	1934–1954	25 × 28	635×711	69	1.753	185	1.28	39,880	177.40	All rebuilt to F5-b, F5-n or F3-an.
	F6 4-6-4	14	BLW 61135–61148	1930	1952–1954	26 × 28	660×711	80	2.032	225	1.55	45,250	201.28	
	F6-a 4-6-4	8	BLW 61655–61662	1931	1952–1954	26 × 28	660×711	80	2.032	225	1.55	45,250	201.28	
	F7 4-6-4	6	Alco 69064–69069	1938	1949–1951	23 1/2 × 30	597×762	84	2.134	300	2.07	50,194	223.27	Streamlined

=== Class G: 4-6-0 ===
Class G was the simple 4-6-0 type, some of which were rebuilt from class B compounds.

Image	Class	Quantity	Builder	Built	Retired	Cylinders (bore × stroke)		Driver diameter		Boiler pressure		Tractive effort		Notes
	Class	Quantity	Builder	Built	Retired	in	mm	in	m	psi	MPa	lbf	kN	Notes
	G1	1	Cooke	1892	1902	17 × 24	432×610	56	1.422	130	0.90	20,600	91.63	Acquired with Milwaukee and Superior Railroad
	G2	4	Brooks 1333–1335, 1514	1888–1889	1925–1927	18 × 24	457×610	56	1.422					Acquired with Milwaukee and Northern Railroad
	G2-a	2	Brooks 1707–1708	1890	1926	18 × 24	457×610	57	1.448					Acquired with Milwaukee and Northern Superior Railroad
	G2-b	1	PRR's Logansport, Indiana shops	1888	1926	19 × 22	483×559	50	1.270					Acquired with Tacoma Eastern Railroad
	G2-c	1	BLW 23673	1904	1931	18 × 24	457×610	63	1.600	200	1.38	20,980	93.32	Acquired with Tacoma Eastern Railroad
	G3	7	R.I. 2548, 2635–2640	1891–1892	1926–1927	18 × 24	457×610	57	1.448	160	1.10	18,550	82.51	
	G4	1	Schen		1925	18 × 26	457×660	57	1.448					Acquired with Montana Railroad
	G4-a	4	Brooks 1219–1220, 1255–1256	1887	1926–1928	18 × 24	457×610	51	1.295	150	1.03	19,440	86.47	Acquired with Milwaukee and Northern Railroad
	G4-b	2	R.I. 3128–3129	1896	1927–1929	18 × 24	457×610	57	1.448	185	1.28	19,133	85.11	Acquired with Des Moines Northern and Western Railroad
	G4-c	3	R.I. 1047, 1052–1053	1881	1926	19 × 26	483×660	62	1.575					
	G4-d	20	R.I. 1411–1430	1883	1926–1933	19 × 26	483×660	63	1.600	150	1.03	18,995	84.49	
	G4-e	101	R.I. (40); Schen (35); Brooks (1); Grant (25);	1885–1888	1926–1933	19 × 26	483×660	63	1.600	150	1.03	18,995	84.49	
	G4-f	7	BLW 15888–15891, 16017–16019	1898		18 × 24	457×610	51	1.295	180	1.24	20,872	92.84	Acquired with Chicago, Terre Haute and Southeastern Railroad, né Southern Indiana
	G4-g	1	MILW's Milwaukee shops	1926 (rebuilt)	1930	19 × 24	483×610	68	1.727	180	1.24	19,494	86.71	Rebuilt from F1 class 4-6-2
	G5	27	R.I.	1891	1925–1934	19 × 26	483×660	57	1.448	150	1.03	20,995	93.39	Eight sold to Montana Railroad in 1907; re-acquired with Montana Railroad in 1910.
	G5-a	19	Schen 3302–3311 (10); BLW (9)	1890–1892	1926–1935	18 × 26	452×660	63	1.600	180	1.24	20,460	91.01	
	G5-b	1	R.I. 2151	1889	1926	19 × 24	483×610	64	1.626					
	G5-s	15	Milwaukee Road (re-builder)	1913–1915	1938–1945	19 × 26	483×660	63	1.600	180	1.24	22,794	101.39	Rebuilt from class B1
	G5-c	1	BLW 32348	1907	1927	19 × 26	483×660	56	1.422					Acquired with Bellingham Bay and British Columbia Railroad
	G5-d	3	Rogers 5386–5388	1899	1930–1934	18 × 26	457×660	51	1.295	190	1.31	26,676	118.66	Acquired with Chicago, Terre Haute and Southeastern Railroad; né Southern Indiana Railroad
	G5-e	10	BLW	1903	1934	19 × 26	483×660	53	1.346	180	1.24	27,095	120.52	Acquired with Chicago, Terre Haute and Southeastern Railroad; né Southern Indiana Railroad
	G6-a	28	Milwaukee Road's Milwaukee Shops	1905	1931–1936	20 1/2 × 26	521×660	73	1.854	200	1.38	25,445	113.18	17 superheated as class G6-as
	G6-b	5	Milwaukee Road's Milwaukee Shops	1907	1945–1948	20 1/2 × 26	521×660	73	1.854	200	1.38	25,445	113.18	4 superheated as class G6-bs
	G6-c	13	Alco-Brooks 45789–45801	1909	1930–1948	20 1/2 × 26	521×660	73	1.854	200	1.38	25,445	113.18	11 superheated ad class G6-cs
	G6-d	2	BLW 31269–31270	1907	1935	18 × 26	457×660	56	1.422	200	1.38	25,570	113.74	Acquired with Idaho and Washington Northern Railroad
	G6-e	3	BLW 31648, 32119, 32764	1907–1908	1935	19 × 26	483×660	63	1.600	200	1.38	25,327	112.66	Acquired with Idaho and Washington Northern Railroad
	G6-fs	18	Milwaukee Road (rebuilder)	1914–1918 (rebuilt)	1932–1954	20 × 26	508×660	63	1.600	180	1.24	25,260	112.36	Rebuilt from class B2
	G6-gs	3	Milwaukee Road (rebuilder)	1915 (rebuilt)	1945–1953	20 × 26	508×660	63	1.600	180	1.24	25,257	112.35	Rebuilt from class B2
	G6-h	1	Cooke 2252	1893	1930	21 × 26	533×660	63	1.600	180	1.24	31,326	139.34	Acquired with Tacoma Eastern Railroad
	G6-k	3	BLW 23682, 26638, 28486	1904–1906	1926–1932	20 × 26	508×660	57	1.448	190	1.31	29,327	130.45	Acquired with Tacoma Eastern Railroad
	G6-m	18	Milwaukee Road (rebuilder)	1921–1928 (rebuilt)	1950–1954	19 × 26	483×660	63	1.600	180	1.24	25,327	112.66	Rebuilt from class B2; all superheated as class G6-ms
	G6-n	4	Milwaukee Road (rebuilder)	1921–24 (rebuilt)	1941–1952	19 × 26	483×660	63	1.600	180	1.24	25,327	112.66	Rebuilt from class B2; all superheated as class G6-ns
	G6-os	4	Milwaukee Road (rebuilder)	1921 (rebuilt)	1949–1951	22 × 26	559×660	69	1.753	200	1.38	31,004	137.91	Rebuilt from class B3
	G6-ps	12	Milwaukee Road (rebuilder)	1921–1927 (rebuilt)	1947–1954	22 × 26	559×660	69	1.753	200	1.38	31,004	137.91	Rebuilt from class B3; Two streamlined as class G 1937–1948
	G6-s	10	Milwaukee Road (rebuilder)	1915–1918 (rebuilt)	1945–1951	22 1/2 × 26	572×660	69	1.753	180	1.24	29,190	129.84	Rebuilt from class B3
	G6-r	4	Alco-Rogers 37567–37572	1905	1934	19 × 26	483×660	57	1.448	190	1.31	26,554	118.12	Acquired with Chicago, Terre Haute and Southeastern Railroaad, né Chicago Southern Railroad
	G7	81	Milwaukee Road's Milwaukee Shops	1904–1909	1928–1940	21 × 30	533×762	69	1.753	200	1.38	32,600	145.01	Seven superheated as class G7-s
	G7-as	10	Milwaukee Road (rebuilder)	1921 (rebuilt)	1940–1954	21 × 30	533×762	69	1.753	200	1.38	32,595	144.99	Rebuilt from class B4
	G7-bs	20	Milwaukee Road (rebuilder)	1915–1918 (rebuilt)	1950–1954	22 × 28	559×711	63	1.600	180	1.24	32,912	146.40	Rebuilt from class B4
	G7-cs	4	Milwaukee Road (rebuilder)	1918–1920 (rebuilt)	1948–1954	22 × 28	559×711	63	1.600	180	1.24	32,912	146.40	Rebuilt from class B4
	G8	25	Milwaukee Road (rebuilder)	1919–1920 (rebuilt)	1950–1957	22 × 28	559×711	63	1.600	200	1.38	36,568	162.66	Rebuilt from class B4
	G8-a	15	Milwaukee Road (rebuilder)	1921–1925 (rebuilt)	1948–1956	22 × 28	559×711	63	1.600	200	1.38	36,568	162.66	Rebuilt from class B4

=== Class H: 4-4-0 ===
Class H covered the 4-4-0 "American" type.

- Milwaukee Road class H1
- Milwaukee Road class H2
- Milwaukee Road class H3
- Milwaukee Road class H4
- Milwaukee Road class H5

Image	Class	Quantity	Builder	Built	Retired	Cylinders (bore × stroke)		Driver diameter		Boiler pressure		Tractive effort		Notes
	Class	Quantity	Builder	Built	Retired	in	mm	in	m	psi	MPa	lbf	kN	Notes
	H6	2	Brooks 1599–1600	1890	1926–1927	17 × 24	432×610	62	1.575					Acquired 1893 with Milwaukee and Northern
	H6-b	3	Schen.3556–3557; R. I. 2797	1891–1892	1926–1930	17 × 24	432×610	62	1.575					Acquired 1899 with Des Moines and North Western
	H6-c	4	Brooks 1432–1433, 1512–1513	1888–1889	1926	17 × 24	432×610	62	1.575					Acquired 1893 with Milwaukee and Northern
	H6-d	31	R. I. 1687–1696; Brooks 1148; Cooke 1754–1763; Grant (10)	1886–1887	1926–1947	18 × 24	457×610	68	1.727	150	1.03	14,500	64.50	
	H7	18	R. I. 1272–1293, 1304–1306	1882–1883	1925–1932	18 × 24	457×610	63	1.600	150	1.03	15,705	69.86	
	H7-a	3	R. I. 1676–1678	1886	1928–1930	18 × 24	457×610	63	1.600	150	1.03	15,740	70.02	Acquired with Chicago, Evanston and Lake Shore Railroad
	H7-b	10	Schen. 2962–2971	1889–1900	1927–1933	17 × 24	432×610	63	1.600	180	1.24	16,840	74.91	
	H7-c	1	BLW 18555	1901	1928	17 × 24	432×610	68	1.727					Acquired from Davenport, Rock Island and Northwestern Railroad
	H7-d	1	BLW 18699	1901	1928	17 × 24	432×610	68	1.727					Acquired from Davenport, Rock Island and Northwestern Railroad
	H8	9	Rogers 6228–6232; Alco (4)	1904–1905	1934–1951	18 × 26	457×660	69	1.753	180	1.24	19,236	85.57	Acquired with Chicago, Terre Haute and Southeastern Railroad

=== Class I: 0-6-0 ===
Class I covered the 0-6-0 switcher types.

Image	Class	Quantity	Builder	Built	Retired	Cylinders (bore × stroke)		Driver diameter		Boiler pressure		Tractive effort		Notes
	Class	Quantity	Builder	Built	Retired	in	mm	in	m	psi	MPa	lbf	kN	Notes
	I1	3	BLW 2391, 4330, 4340	1871, 1878	1917	16 × 24	406×310	50	1.270					
	I2	2	Brooks 1340, 1673	1888, 1890	1918	17 × 24	432×310	50	1.270					Acquired with Milwaukee and Northern
	I3	9	Rhode Island 2621, 2622, 2624, 2702–2707	1891	1926–1945	18 × 24	457×310	50	1.270	160	1.10	20,736	92.24	Two rebuilt to 0-6-0ST as class I3-ax
	I4	3	Milwaukee Shops	1891–1895	1926–1928	18 × 24	457×310	51	1.295	180	1.24	23,330	103.78	
	I4-a	43	Milwaukee Shops (38); BLW 16206–16210 (5)	1898–1902	1909–1944	18 × 24	457×310	51	1.295	180	1.24	23,330	103.78	One rebuilt to 0-6-0ST as class I-4ax
	I5	6	Milwaukee Shops	1902–1903	1931–1934	19 × 26	483×660	51	1.295	180	1.24	28,160	125.26	
	I5-a	166	Milwaukee Shops	1903–1913	1933–1955	19 × 26	483×660	51	1.295	180	1.24	28,158	125.25	Two rebuilt to 0-6-0ST as class I-5ax
	I5-b	2	BLW 32423, 34354	1907, 1910	1934	19 × 26	483×660	51	1.295	180	1.24	28,158	125.25	Acquired with Chicago, Milwaukee and Gary
	I6-s	10	Milwaukee Shops	1913–1914	1948–1956	20 × 26	508×660	51	1.295	180	1.24	31,200	138.78	

=== Class J: 0-4-0 ===
Class J covered 0-4-0 switchers.

Image	Class	Quantity	Builder	Built	Retired	Cylinders (bore × stroke)		Driver diameter		Boiler pressure		Tractive effort		Notes
	Class	Quantity	Builder	Built	Retired	in	mm	in	m	psi	MPa	lbf	kN	Notes
	J1	2	BLW 3488–3489	1873	1905	14 × 22	356×559	49	1.245					
	J2	3	Brooks	1883–1887	1911–1917	16 × 22	406×559	48	1.219					Acquired with Milwaukee and Northern
	J2-a	80	various	1878–1882	1906–1930	16 × 22	406×559	50	1.270	130	0.90	12,200	54.27	
	J3	5	Grant	1893	1918–1926	16 × 22	406×559	51	1.295	160	1.10	15,020	66.81	

=== Class K: 2-6-2 ===
Class K comprised 2-6-2 "Prairie" locomotives.

Image	Class	Quantity	Builder	Built	Retired	Cylinders (bore × stroke)		Driver diameter		Boiler pressure		Tractive effort		Notes
	Class	Quantity	Builder	Built	Retired	in	mm	in	m	psi	MPa	lbf	kN	Notes
	K1	195	Alco (125); Milwaukee Road (70)	1907–1909	1935–1945	21 × 28	533×711	63	1.600	200	1.38	33,320	148.21	71 rebuilt to K1-as
	K1-as	71	Alco (41); Milwaukee Road (30)		1935–1955	21 1/2 × 28	546×711	63	1.600	185	1.28	32,310	143.72	rebuilt from K1
	K1-a	1	BLW 34918	1910	1927	17 × 24	432×610	44	1.118					Acquired with Puget Sound and Willapa Harbor Railroad. Sold to Cascade Timber Company

=== Class L: 2-8-2 ===
Class L was for 2-8-2 "Mikado" locomotives.

Image	Class	Quantity	Builder	Built	Retired	Cylinders (bore × stroke)		Driver diameter		Boiler pressure		Tractive effort		Notes
	Class	Quantity	Builder	Built	Retired	in	mm	in	m	psi	MPa	lbf	kN	Notes
	L1	20	Milwaukee Road	1909	1945–1954	24 × 30	610×762	63	1.600	200	1.38	46,630	207.42	2 locomotives superheated as L1-s
	L1-s	2	Milwaukee Road		1940	26 × 30	660×762	63	1.600	185	1.28	50,620	225.17	
	L2	180	Milwaukee Road (40); Alco (140)	1912–1914	1935–1955	26 × 30	660×762	63	1.600	200	1.38	54,723	243.42	69 fitted with stokers as class L2-r
	L2a	100	BLW	1920	1949–1954	26 × 30	660×762	63	1.600	200	1.38	54,723	243.42	
	L2b	100	BLW	1922–1923	1950–1956	26 × 30	660×762	63	1.600	200	1.38	54,723	243.42	
	L3	100	Alco 59740–59789, 61042–61046, 61148–61192	1918–1919	1938–1956	27 × 32	686×813	63	1.600	200	1.38	62,949	280.01	USRA Heavy Mikado. 18 fitted with booster as class L3-a. One fitted with tender booster as class L3-b

=== Class M: 2-6-0 ===
Class M was for the 2-6-0 type.

Image	Class	Quantity	Builder	Built	Retired	Cylinders (bore × stroke)		Driver diameter		Boiler pressure		Tractive effort		Notes
	Class	Quantity	Builder	Built	Retired	in	mm	in	m	psi	MPa	lbf	kN	Notes
	M1	2	BLW	1905	1925, 1927	18 × 24	457×610	63	1.600	190	1.31	19,930	88.65	Acquired with Montana Railroad
	M1a	1	BLW	1891	1928	17 × 24	432×610	54	1.372					Acquired with Bellingham Bay and British Columbia Railroad
	M1b	3	BLW	1892	1930	20 × 24	508×610	51	1.295	140	0.97	22,400	99.64	Acquired with Chicago, Terre Haute and Southeastern Railroad
	M1c	2	BLW	1901	1930	20 × 24	508×610	51	1.295	160	1.10	25,600	113.87	Acquired with Chicago, Terre Haute and Southeastern Railroad, originally Southern Indiana Railroad
	M1d	11	Rogers	1904, 1905	1910–1934	20 × 24	508×610	51	1.295	160	1.10	25,600	113.87	Acquired with Chicago, Terre Haute and Southeastern Railroad, originally Southern Indiana Railroad.
	M1e	4	Alco	1904, 1905	1934	19 × 26	483×660	57	1.448	200	1.38	27,996	124.53	Acquired with Chicago, Milwaukee and Gary Railroad, originally, Illinois, Iowa and Minnesota Railroad.
	M2	4	Alco	1905, 1906	1927–1934	20 × 28	508×711	63	1.600	200	1.38	30,222	134.43	ex Chicago Junction.

=== Class N: 2-6-6-2 ===
Class N consisted of articulated locomotives of 2-6-6-2 arrangement.

Image	Class	Quantity	Builder	Built	Retired	Cylinders (bore × stroke)		Driver diameter		Boiler pressure		Tractive effort		Notes
	Class	Quantity	Builder	Built	Retired	in	mm	in	m	psi	MPa	lbf	kN	Notes
	N1	25	Alco-S 48838–48862	1910–1911	1928–1935	23 1/2 × 30; 37 × 30	597×762; 940×762	57	1.448	200	1.38	70,396	313.14	Compound Mallet. 17 rebuilt to class N3
	N2	16	Alco-S 51057–51066, 52124–52129	1912	1934–1949	23 1/2 × 30; 37 × 30	597×762; 940×762	57	1.448	200	1.38	70,396	313.14	Compound Mallet
	N3	17	Milwaukee Road (re-built)	1929–1931	1950–1954	21 1/2 × 30	546×762	57	1.448	200	1.38	87,720	390.20	Four cylinder simple articulated. Rebuilt from class N1

=== Class S: 4-8-4 ===
Class S were 4-8-4 "Northern" locomotives.

Image	Class	Quantity	Builder	Built	Retired	Cylinders (bore × stroke)		Driver diameter		Boiler pressure		Tractive effort		Notes
	Class	Quantity	Builder	Built	Retired	in	mm	in	m	psi	MPa	lbf	kN	Notes
	S1	2	BLW 61176 (1), Milwaukee Shops (1)	1930 (1), 1938 (1)	1954	28 × 30	711×762	74	1.88	230	1.59	62,136	276.39	
	S2	40	BLW 62089–62118, 62344–62353	1937–1940	1954–1956	26 × 32	660×813	74	1.88	285	1.97	70,816	315.01	
	S3	10	Alco 71973–71982	1944	1954–1956	26 × 32	660×813	74	1.88	250	1.72	62,116	276.31	Two preserved: (261) in Minneapolis, 265 at IRM

=== Class X: Shay ===
Class X covered Lima Shay's.

Image	Class	Quantity	Builder	Built	Retired	Cylinders (bore × stroke)		Driver diameter		Boiler pressure		Tractive effort		Notes
	Class	Quantity	Builder	Built	Retired	in	mm	in	m	psi	MPa	lbf	kN	Notes
	Milwaukee Road class X1	1	Lima 2057	1908	after 1947	11 × 12		32	0.813	200		22,563 lbs		Class B, 50 Ton Shay. CM&StP 1499, renumbered as CM&StP 25 in 1912
	Milwaukee Road class X2	1	Lima 1912	6/1907	sold 1919	12 × 15		36	0.914	200		30,375 lbs		Class C, 3 truck shay. Acquired with the Idaho & Washington Northern Railroad as their #6. Renumbered as CM&StP 26 in 1916.

== Diesel ==
=== ALCO ===
Image	Model	Milwaukee class	Quantity	Built	Retired	Notes
	ALCO HH600	6-AS	2	1939	1961	
	ALCO HH660	6.6-AS	2	1940	1961	
	ALCO HH1000	10-AS	2	1940	1965	
	Alco S-2	10-AS	31	1940–50	1960-66	
	Alco S-4	10-AS	34	1950–54	1966-76	
	ALCO RS-1	10-ARS	7	1941 (2); 1943 (2); 1953 (3)	1943 (2); 1967 (5)	First two requisitioned by US Army in 1943.
	ALCO RSC-2	15-ARS-6	18	1946–47	1967-76 (RSC-2) / 1976 (RSC-2m)	Three swapped trucks with RS-2s in 1955. Four others rebuilt by Alco to "RSC-2m" in 1965
	ALCO RS-2	15-ARS	4	1949	1967-72	Three swapped trucks with RSC-2s in 1955
	ALCO RS-3	16-ARS	21	1953–55	1966-76	
	ALCO RSD-5	16-ARS-6	6	1953	1976	
	ALCO DL-107	20-AP-6	2	1941	1962	

=== Baldwin ===
Image	Model	Milwaukee class	Quantity	Built	Retired	Notes
	Baldwin VO-660	6.6-BS	1	1940	1961	
	Baldwin VO-1000	10-BS	12	1940–45	1965–72	
	Baldwin DS-4-4-1000	10-BS	10	1948–49	1967-76	
	Baldwin S-12	12-BS	21	1950–54	1968–76	
	Baldwin RS-12	12-BRS	2	1951–52	1974–76	
	Baldwin AS-616	16-BRS-6	8	1951–53	1967-76	Two were built as AS-616B models (rebuilt as AS-616 in 1953)

=== Davenport ===
Image	Model	Milwaukee class	Quantity	Built	Retired	Notes
	Davenport 44-ton	3.8-DS;	2	1942	1958	380 hp

=== EMD ===
==== Switchers ====
Image	Model	Milwaukee class	Quantity	Built	Retired	Notes
	EMD SW1	6-ES	25	1939–41	1975–1983	
	EMD NW2	10-ES	8	1939–1947	1981–1984	
	EMD TR2		2 units (1 A–B cow–calf set)	1949	1978–1979	
	EMD SW7	10-ES	1	1950	1984	
	EMD TR4		12 units (6 A–B cow–calf sets)	1950–1951	1980–1984	
	EMD SW9	9-ES	3	1951	1982–1984	
	EMD SW1200	12-ES	48	1954	1980–(end)	
	EMD MP15AC	15-ES	64	1975–76	(end)	all to Soo Line Railroad

==== Cab units ====
Image	Model	Milwaukee class	Quantity	Built	Retired	Notes
	EMD E6	20-EP	2 A units	1941	1961	
	EMD E7	20-EP	10 A units	1946	1969	
	EMD E9	24-EP	18 units (6 ABA sets)	1956	1973	Built to UP specification with steam generators for inter-city service.
	EMD E9	24-EP	6 A units	1961	1982	Built equipped with head end power for suburban service.
	EMD FT	13.5-EF	52 units (26 A-B semi-permanently coupled pairs, making up 13 ABBA sets)	1941–45	1959	
	EMD F3	15-EF	16 units (4 ABBA sets)	1949	1965	
	EMD F7	15-EF	118 units (68 A units, 50 B units)	1949–1953	1974–1984	
	EMD FP7	15-EP	32 (16 FP7-F7B-FP7 sets)	1950–1952	1976–1984	Five sets reassigned to freight service
	EMD F9	17.5-EF	12 units (6 AB sets)	1954	1977–1982	Four A units re-equipped for suburban service

==== Cowl units ====
Image	Model	Milwaukee class	Quantity	Built	Retired	Notes
	EMD FP45	36-EP-6	5	1968	1982–1984	Built for intercity passenger train service. All five later re-equipped for freight train service after formation of Amtrak.
	EMD F40C		15	1974		Built for suburban commuter passenger service. All later turned over to RTA when RTA assumed responsibility for suburban commuter passenger service. Both surviving units are in preservation. Model was unique to Milwaukee Road.

==== Hood units ====
Image	Model	Milwaukee class	Quantity	Built	Retired	Notes
	EMD SD7	15-ERS-6	24	1952–53		17 rebuilt to "SD10"
	EMD GP9	17.5-ERS	128	1954–59		54 rebuilt to "GP20m"
	EMD SD9	17.5-ERS-6	14	1954		4 rebuilt to "SD10"
	EMD GP30	22.5-ERS	16	1963	1984	
	EMD GP35	25-ERS	12	1965	1984	
	EMD SDL39	23-ERS-6	10	1969–72		Model unique to the Milwaukee Road
	EMD GP40	30-ERS-4	72	1966–69		
	EMD SD45	36-ERS-6	10	1968		
	EMD SD40-2	30-ERS-6	90	1972–74		
	EMD GP38-2	20-ERS-4	16	1973–74		

=== Fairbanks-Morse ===
Image	Model	Milwaukee class	Quantity	Built	Retired	Notes
	FM H-10-44	10-FS	24	1944–50	1978–81	
	FM H-12-44	12-FS	48	1950–55	1972–81	
	FM H-16-44	16-FRS	37	1954–56	1967–76	
	FM H-16-66	16-FRS-6	6	1953	1972-75	Railfan nickname - Baby Trainmaster
	FM CF-16-4	15-FF	18	1951	1966-67	6 ABA sets
	FM Erie-built	20-FP-6	20 (14 A units, 6 B units)	1946–48	1963	originally 6 ABA sets, 1 AA set

=== General Electric ===
Image	Model	Milwaukee class	Quantity	Built	Retired	Notes
	GE 44-ton	3.6-GS	3	1940–1941	1958–1967	
	GE U23B	23-GRS	5	1973	1984–1985	
	GE U25B	25-GRS	12	1965	1966 (1), 1984 (11)	One unit wrecked at Whitman, Minnesota in 1966
	GE U28B	28-GRS	12	1966	1984	
	GE U30B	30-GRS	10	1966–68	1980 (1), 1984 (9)	
	GE U30C	30-GRS-6	8	1974	1985	
	GE U33C	33-GRS-6	4	1968	1980 (1), 1982 (3)	
	GE U36C	36-GRS-6	4	1972	1984–1985	

=== Whitcomb ===
Image	Model	Milwaukee class	Quantity	Built	Retired	Notes
	Whitcomb 44-ton (B-B)	3.8-WS	7	1940–1941	1941 (1), 1954–68	380 hp, 1 sold to Purdue University in 1941
	Whitcomb 80-ton (1D1)	6.5-WS	2	1929-30	1944	built as 300 hp gas-electric, rebuilt to 650 hp diesel-electric in 1941; sold to US Government 1944

== Electric ==
The Milwaukee Road was one of the most electrified railroads in the United States. The system used was 3,000 volt DC overhead line.

=== Switchers ===
- Milwaukee Road class ES-1 - 1 example (built 1915), the Great Falls, Montana switcher. Used 1,500 volts DC.
- Milwaukee Road class ES-2 - 4 examples (built 1916–19).
- Milwaukee Road class ES-3 - 1 example. heavy switching locomotive made from a surplus number of EF-1 boxcab units.

=== Passenger ===
- Milwaukee Road class EP-1 - 12 2-unit boxcab sets (24 locomotives) built in 1915 by ALCO/GE. Converted to freight class EF-1 in 1920. In 1950, two boxcab two-unit sets were converted for passenger service (class EP-1A).
- Milwaukee Road class EP-2 - The "Bi-Polars". 5 built by GE in 1919.
- Milwaukee Road class EP-3 - The "Quills" (quill drive). 10 built by Baldwin/Westinghouse in 1919.
- Milwaukee Road class EP-4 - "Little Joes". Two examples built by GE in 1946. Converted to freight class EF-4 in 1956.

=== Freight ===
- Milwaukee Road class EF-1 - 30 two-unit boxcab sets (60 locomotives) built in 1915 by ALCO/GE, identical to EP-1 but for gearing and paint. In addition, the EP-1 units were converted to EF-1 specification in 1920.
- Milwaukee Road class EF-2 - 3-unit boxcab sets formed from EF-1s in the 1930s.
- Milwaukee Road class EF-3 - 3-unit boxcab sets formed from EF-1s with the middle unit shortened by removing the cab and leading truck; the resultant B units were known as "bobtails".
- Milwaukee Road class EF-4 - "Little Joes". 10 examples built by GE in 1946 for the Soviet Ministry of Railways as Class A. In addition, the EP-4 locomotives were converted to EF-4 specification in 1956.
- Milwaukee Road class EF-5 - Four-unit boxcab sets formed with any combination of regular or bobtail units in the middle.

== Rebuilds ==
=== Rebuilt ALCO ===
Model	Milwaukee class	Rebuilder	Total rebuilt	Rebuild date	Retired	Notes	Refs.
RS2m	–	Milwaukee Road's Milwaukee shops	1	–	–		

=== Rebuilt EMD ===
Image	Model	Milwaukee class	Rebuilder	Total rebuilt	Rebuild date	Retired	Notes	Refs.
	GP20m	17.5-ERS-6	Milwaukee Road's Milwaukee shops	50	June 1969 – October 1973	–		
	SD10	18-ERS-6	Milwaukee Road's West Milwaukee shops	21	March 1974 – January 1976	–		

== Preserved locomotives ==
=== Steam ===
Only six Milwaukee Road steam locomotives survive:

Image	MILW No.	Class	Type	Manufacturer	Serial No.	Date	Notes	Refs.
	111	—	4-4-0	Breese, Kneeland, and Company	73	May 1857	Ex-Milwaukee & Mississippi No. 40 Spring Green; sold in 1889, became El Paso & Southwestern Railroad No. 1.	
	261	S3	4-8-4	American Locomotive Company	71974	July 1944	Owned by Friends of the 261, operational.	
	265	S3	4-8-4	American Locomotive Company	71978	July 1944	On Display at the Illinois Railway Museum, Union, Illinois.	
	1057	J2-a	0-4-0	Milwaukee Shops	—	1885	Originally No. 37, renumbered 58 in 1898, then 1057 in 1899.	
	1004	G8	4-6-0	Milwaukee Road (r/b)	19543	September 1920	Rebuilt from class B4 no. 4335 (Baldwin 19543 of 1901) and numbered 2404; renumbered 1004 in 1938.	
	1416	I5-a	0-6-0	Milwaukee Shops	—	April 1908	Originally 1207, renumbered 1416 in 1938; at EMTRAC in Evansville, Indiana.	

In addition, the tender from a class S2 locomotive also survives in Ingomar, Montana.

=== Diesel ===
Image	MILW No.	Model	Class	Manufacturer	Rebuilder	Serial No.	Build date	Rebuild date	Current status	Notes	Refs.
	532	SD10	18-ERS-6	General Motors Electro-Motive Division (EMD)	Milwaukee Road's West Milwaukee shops	18780	February 1954	October 1975	Operational; Whitewater Valley Scenic Railroad at Connersville, Indiana		
	988	RSC-2	15-ARS	American Locomotive Company	Not rebuilt	75135	January 1947	Not rebuilt	On static display; Mid-Continent Railway Museum at North Freedom, Wisconsin		
	615			General Motors Electro-Motive Division (EMD)			1954		Operational; Oklahoma Railway Museum at Oklahoma City, Oklahoma		
	760	H10-44		Fairbanks Morse			1944		On display at the Illinois Railway Museum, Union, Illinois		
	1603	HH-660		American Locomotive Company			1939		On display at the Illinois Railway Museum, Union, Illinois		
	5056	U25B		General Electric			1965		On display at the Illinois Railway Museum, Union, Illinois		
	104C	FP7A		General Motors Electro-Motive Division (EMD)			1952		On display at the Illinois Railway Museum, Union, Illinois		
	118C	F7A		General Motors Electro-Motive Division (EMD)			1951		On display at the Illinois Railway Museum, Union, Illinois		
	33C	E9A		General Motors Electro-Motive Division (EMD)		21608	1956		On display at the Illinois Railway Museum, Union, Illinois		
	35A	E9A		General Motors Electro-Motive Division (EMD)			1956		On display outside of the former West Madison Station, Madison, Wisconsin		
	36A	E9A		General Motors Electro-Motive Division (EMD)			1961		On display with Little Joe E70 outside the Montana Auto Museum, Deer Lodge, Montana		
	37A	E9A		General Motors Electro-Motive Division (EMD)		25657	1961		On display at the Illinois Railway Museum, Union, Illinois		
	96B	F7B		General Motors Electro-Motive Division (EMD)		10365	1951		On display at the Illinois Railway Museum, Union, Illinois		
	51	F40C		General Motors Electro-Motive Division (EMD)			1974		On display, awaiting restoration at Railroading Heritage of Midwest America, Silvis, Illinois	Later became Metra 611	
	54	F40C		General Motors Electro-Motive Division (EMD)			1974		On display, awaiting restoration at the Illinois Railway Museum, Union, Illinois	Later became Metra 614	

=== Electric ===
- 10200A+B, later E50A+B - class EF-1 at the Lake Superior Railroad Museum in Duluth, Minnesota
- 10211B, later E57B - class ES-3 at Harlowton, Montana
- 10251, later E2 - class EP-2, at the National Museum of Transportation in St. Louis, Missouri
- E70 - class EF-4 at Deer Lodge, Montana
