= L2 =

L2, L^{2}, L02, L II, L.2 or L-2 may refer to:

== Astronomy ==
- L_{2} point, second Lagrangian point in a two body orbiting system
- L_{2} Puppis, star which is also known as HD 56096
- Advanced Telescope for High Energy Astrophysics, a proposed X-ray telescope

== Biology ==
- Haplogroup L2 (mtDNA) in human genetics
- ATC code L02 Endocrine therapy, a subgroup of the Anatomical Therapeutic Chemical Classification System
- the second lumbar vertebrae of the vertebral column in human anatomy
- the second larval stage in the Caenorhabditis elegans worm development

== Computing ==
- L2 cache, the Level-2 CPU cache in a computer
- Layer 2 of the OSI model, in computer networking
- L2 (operating system), or Liedtke 2 (a.k.a. EUMEL/ELAN), a persistent microkernel operating system developed by German computer scientist Jochen Liedtke
- L2 (programming language)
- ISO/IEC 8859-2 (Latin-2), an 8-bit character encoding

== Entertainment ==
- L2 (music group), an American pop duo
- L2: Empuraan, a 2025 Indian film, also called L2E
  - L2: Empuraan (soundtrack), soundtrack album to L2: Empuraan
- Leprechaun 2, a 1994 American film
- Lineage II, a 2003 MMO game
- Lumines II, a 2006 puzzle game
- L2, a former name of the O2 Academy Liverpool

== Mathematics ==
- The L^{2} space of square-integrable functions
- L^{2} norm
- The ℓ^{2} space of square-summable sequences
- L^{2} cohomology, a cohomology theory for smooth non-compact manifolds with Riemannian metric
- L_{2}(n), the family of 2-dimensional projective special linear groups on finite fields.
- Ridge regression, regression and regularization method also known as L2 regularization

== Technology and weapons ==
- a variety of low-alloy special purpose steel
- a L-carrier cable system developed by AT&T
- a series of fragmentation hand grenades used by the British armed forces (American M61 copies), before being replaced by the L109 grenade
- the L designation given to the Sterling submachine gun in the British armed forces
- a frequency used in GPS satellite navigation signals, see GPS signals, a newer version is the L2C frequency

== Transportation ==
=== Aircraft ===
- LZ 18 (L 2), a short-lived 1913 German airship (Imperial Navy designation: L 2)
- Arado L II, a 1929 German model of high-wing sporting monoplane
- ASJA L2, a pair of 1932 Swedish trainer biplanes
- Lawson L-2, a 1920 American biplane airliner
- Macchi L.2, an Italian model of biplane flying boat
- L-2 Grasshopper, an American Taylorcraft model used in WWII
- PZL Ł.2, a 1929 Polish model of liaison aircraft

=== Aviation ===
- Junkers L2, an engine model; precursor to the Junkers L5
- Lynden Air Cargo, Alaskan airline (IATA code: L2)
- Walker County Airport (or Bevill Field), Alabama, U.S. (former FAA LID: L02)

=== Rail locomotives ===
- Chesapeake and Ohio Class L-2 and L-2a, an American 4-6-4 "Hudson" type steam locomotives model
- Milwaukee Road class L2, an American 2-8-2 "Mikado" type steam locomotive
- SP&S Class L-2, an 1881 steam locomotives class
- LNER Class L2, a 1925 class of 2-6-4Ts

=== Other modes of transport ===
- L2 (New York City bus), a temporary bus route in New York City, U.S.
- The Randwick branch of the CBD and South East Light Rail in Sydney, Australia, numbered L2
- L2, an S-Bahn line of the Léman Express in Switzerland and France

== Other uses ==
- Second language (L2), a non-native, acquired tongue of an individual
- L², a Flemish political youth organization
- L-2 visa, a U.S. travel document for dependents of temporary workers
- a class of FM radio broadcasting in North America
- Ligue 2, a French association football league
- L2 Inc, an American market research company

== See also ==
- 2L (disambiguation)
- LII (disambiguation)
- Level 2 (disambiguation)
