= Milwaukee Road class ES-2 =

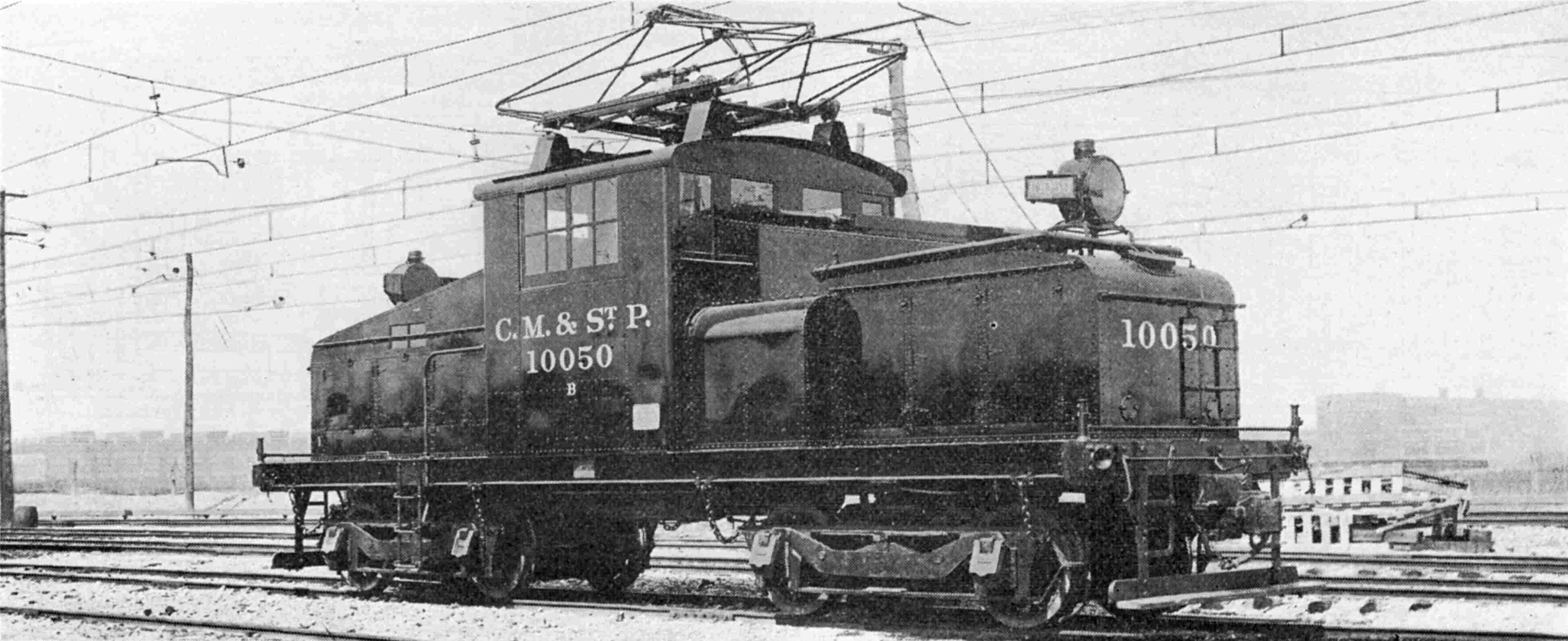
Type and origin
- Power type: Electric
- Builder: General Electric
- Serial number: 5478, 5479, 6983, 6984
- Build date: 1916 (2), 1919 (2)
- Total produced: 4
Specifications
- Configuration
  - AAR: B-B
  - UIC: Bo′Bo′
- Gauge: 4 ft 8 1/2 in (1,435 mm) standard gauge
- Wheel diameter: 40 in (1.016 m)
- Wheelbase: 30 ft 4 in (9.25 m)
- Length: 41 ft 5 in (12.62 m)
- Width: 10 ft 1.5 in (3.09 m)
- Height: 16 ft 8 in (5.08 m)
- Loco weight: 164,000 lb (74,000 kg; 74 t)
- Electric system/s: 3,000 V DC
- Current pickup(s): One pantograph; also emergency trolley pole (for air recharge only, not for operation)
Performance figures
- Power output: Continuous: 475 hp (354 kW); One hour: 670 hp (500 kW)
Career
- Operators: Milwaukee Road
- Class: ES-2
- Numbers: 10050–10053; E80–E83 from March 1939
- Disposition: All scrapped

The Milwaukee Road's class ES-2 comprised four electric switcher locomotives. Two were built in 1916 and the final two in 1919. They were of steeplecab design, with a single roof-mounted pantograph to access the Milwaukee's 3,000 V DC overhead line. Originally numbered 10050–10053, they were renumbered E80–E83 in March 1939. The ES-2 was the Milwaukee Road's primary class of dedicated electric switchers.

Electric switching on the Milwaukee Road was always limited to the Rocky Mountain Division, and to the middle and east end only, Avery being merely a power change, rather than a switching, location. Harlowton's switching demands eventually exceeded the capabilities of the ES-2, which was replaced in 1951 by a single GE Freight Motor (later reclassed ES-3) instead; thus from the 1950s to the 1970s the ES-2s were normally used only in the greater Butte area, in which the Deer Lodge shops were also located. The Coast Division eschewed electric switchers entirely, as its operating characteristics and economics were more favorable to otherwise underutilized steam (later diesel) switchers which also served the Milwaukee's non-electrified branches in the area.

Despite their highly specialized niche on the Milwaukee Road, the ES-2s were well-liked by personnel. Engineers liked them due to their rapid throttle response, preferring them over diesels which were slower to transition and accelerate. Their simple nature made them easy to service, and the units seldom needed major attention. Few changes were made to them over the years, the most important of which was the addition of extra steel plates, which added weight and reduced wheelslip.

In addition to the pantograph, the ES-2s were equipped with a wooden trolley pole which was spring-tensioned and manually operated, in the same manner as on a trolley car, though it was never meant for use while in motion. Its sole purpose was to make stationary contact with the wire to charge an empty air compressor enough to raise the air-operated pantograph, usually when making a black start after dead storage or maintenance. For this reason, the pole was tipped with a metal plate rather than a shoe or trolley wheel.

From 1951 to 1974, one ES-2 was the Deer Lodge switcher, while another unit served to switch the yard at Butte. One unit was held in reserve at Deer Lodge to substitute for either of the other two. The E83 became surplus and was scrapped in 1952. The other three continued in service until the end of electric operations on the Milwaukee Road on June 15, 1974. The E82 was also the last Milwaukee electric locomotive to operate on the final day, after the Little Joes were stored upon arrival at Deer Lodge.

None survived into preservation.
