= 2L =

2L or 2-L may refer to:

- Helvetic Airways IATA code
- Second Life
- Second year law school student in the United States
- 2-liter bottle

== See also ==
- L2 (disambiguation)
