= LII =

LII may refer to:

- Year AD 52, in Roman numerals
- 52 (number) in Roman numerals
- Laser-induced incandescence, a method of measuring particle sizes in flames
- Legal Information Institute, a non-profit public service of Cornell Law School
- Lithium iodide (LiI)
- Logical Intuitive Introvert, one of the 16 classifications of people in socionics
- Gromov Flight Research Institute, a Russian aircraft test base (ЛИИ, or LII, in Russian)
- Super Bowl LII, the fifty-second NFL Super Bowl
- Lennox International (NYSE ticker LII)

== See also ==
- L2 (disambiguation)
