= Milwaukee Road 1004 =

Preserved American 4-6-0 locomotive

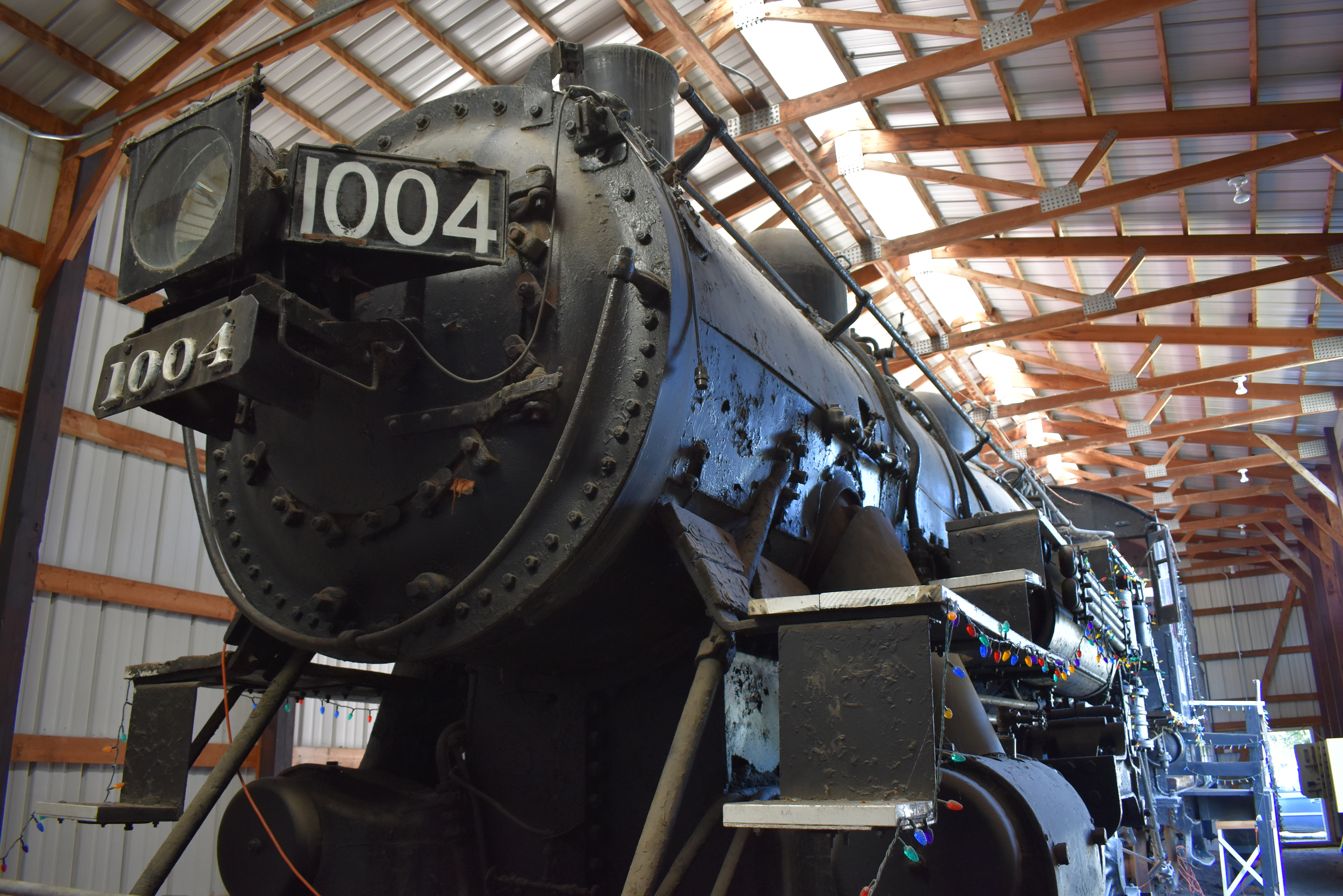
- Milwaukee Road 1004 in Austin, MN
Type and origin
- Power type: Steam
- Builder: Baldwin Locomotive Works
- Serial number: 19543
- Build date: September 1901
- Rebuilder: Milwaukee Road
- Rebuild date: February 1920
Specifications
- Configuration
  - Whyte: 4-6-0
  - UIC: 2′C h2
- Gauge: 4 ft 8 1/2 in (1,435 mm) standard gauge
- Driver dia.: 63 in (1,600 mm)
- Loco weight: 182,700 pounds (82,900 kg)
- Fuel type: Coal
- Boiler pressure: 200 lbf/in^{2} (1,400 kPa; 14 kgf/cm^{2})
- Cylinders: Two, outside
- Cylinder size: 22 in × 28 in (559 mm × 711 mm)
- Valve gear: Baker
- Valve type: Piston valves
- Loco brake: Air
- Train brakes: Air
- Couplers: Knuckle
Performance figures
- Tractive effort: 36,568 lbf (162.66 kN)
Career
- Operators: Milwaukee Road
- Class: G8
- Numbers: MLW 385; MLW 1735; MLW 4335; MLW 2604; MLW 1004
- Last run: March 16, 1957
- Retired: April 1957
- Current owner: Mower County Historical Society
- Disposition: On static display

Milwaukee Road 1004 is a preserved 4-6-0 "Ten-wheeler" type steam locomotive, built by the Baldwin Locomotive Works in September 1901 as a class B4 four-cylinder Vauclain compound locomotive for the Milwaukee Road who numbered it No. 385.

It was renumbered No. 1735 in 1907, and renumbered again in 1912 as No. 4335. Like most of the Milwaukee Road's Vaulclain compounds, it was rebuilt as a two-cylinder simple locomotive; for 4335 this happened in February 1920 when it was reclassified as class G8 and renumbered No. 2604. In the Milwaukee Road's 1938 renumbering, it received its last number — No. 1004.

No. 1004 spent the majority of its time on the Milwaukee Road's roster as a freight locomotive, but in its final years of service, it served as a yard switcher in Minneapolis, Minnesota, and as a weed-scalder along the railroad's trackage. On March 16, 1957, No. 1004 was fired up to relieve a broken down motor car on a local passenger run between Austin, Minnesota and La Crosse, Wisconsin, and it became the locomotive's final revenue assignment. With all of the Milwaukee Road's other steam locomotives out of service by December 1955, No. 1004 became the final steam locomotive to be retired from the railroad.

Due to the significance, a number of communities and representatives, including Austin city mayor Charles Hansen, approached the Milwaukee Road and requested for the locomotive to be donated to them. The railroad agreed to donate No. 1004 to the city of Austin, and after its formal retirement in April, it was subsequently put on static display at their fairgrounds. As of 2026, No. 1004 remains in Austin, and it is the only surviving member of its class, and it is one of only five surviving Milwaukee Road steam locomotives.

== Bibliography ==
- Edson, W. D. (Spring 1977). "Milwaukee Road locomotives: All time steam, diesel and electric roster". Railroad History (136). Boston: The Railway and Locomotive Historical Society, Inc.
