= Level 2 =

Level 2 or Level II may refer to:

== Technology ==
- level 2 cache, a type of cache computer memory
- Level 2, a level of automation in a self-driving car (see Autonomous car#Classification)
- A NASDAQ price quotation service
- Level II, the full and raw dataset from the U.S. National Weather Service's WSR-88D weather radar
- Level 2, one of the levels in system support
- Biosafety level 2, a laboratory grade
- Level 2 market data

== Music ==
- Level 2 (Animal X album), 2001
- Level II (Blackstreet album), 2003
- Level II (Eru album), 2006
- Level 2, 2011 album by Last Chance to Reason

== Other ==
- Level II, a skatepark located in the upstairs of the Dee Stadium in Houghton, Michigan
- "Level Two" (Arrow), an episode of Arrow
- Level 2 coronavirus restrictions, see COVID-19 pandemic in Scotland#Levels System
- STANAG 4569 protection level
- Vash: Level 2, a 2025 Indian horror film by Krishnadev Yagnik
