= Tacoma Eastern Railroad =

Establishment by John F. Hart and George E. Hart in 1891

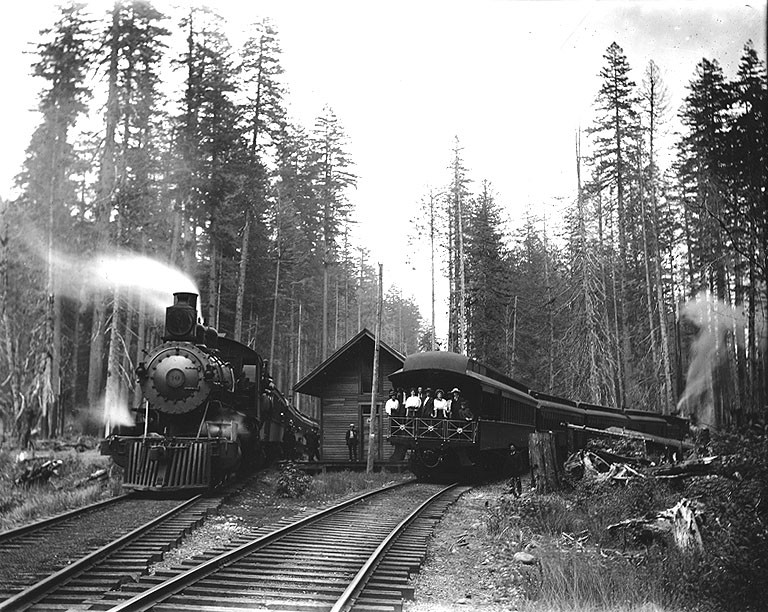
Two trains south of Tacoma, Washington

The Tacoma Eastern Railroad was officially established by John F. Hart and George E. Hart in 1891. The enterprising lumberman received leases from Pierce County to harvest lumber from sections of a local school district. By 1890, most available timber near navigable water had been harvested. Sawmill industries had traditionally used the Puget Sound to float their wares to schooner captains, which could then be transported to markets, typically in San Francisco. To accommodate this new dilemma, the J.F Hart and Company (owned by John and George Hart) began planning and construction for the Tacoma Eastern Railroad.

In its pre-incorporation phase, the Tacoma Eastern Railroad was a 30-inch narrow gauge logging road, about two miles long, running from a shallow-water wharf at the head of Commencement Bay in Tacoma, Washington. The railroad left the wharf fronting Dock Street and continued southward through a steep chasm to a sawmill located near South 38th Street. The railroad, the wharf, and the sawmill were owned and operated by brothers John F. and George E. Hart. Along with their sawmills, they operated a wide variety of companies including the first legitimate opera house in Everett, Washington and successful real estate investments. The little narrow gauge road brought dimensional lumber materials from the Harts' sawmill to their wharf, largely for export to the lumber-hungry markets of San Francisco.

== Gauge conversion ==
The early operations of the railroad appear to have been successful, but the Hart Brothers may have been concerned about their limited ability to expand their market base and move their product due to the fact they were unable to interchange cars with the 4 ft 8 1/2 in (1,435 mm) standard gauge Northern Pacific Railroad. A reconstruction program was initiated to convert the railroad from narrow to standard gauge. The two-mile road was apparently completed by May 1890 and the line became known officially as the Tacoma Eastern Railroad for the first time.

== Expansion ==
Once incorporated, the Hart brothers set out to tap vast stands of virgin forests in the foothills of Mount Rainier by building southward through the gulch that now bears the name of that railroad. The Puyallup people used this route prior to pioneer settlement and referred to the gulch at the head of Commencement Bay as Wad Shum Shum, which means "the trail to high ground." During this important building phase, the Hart brothers managed to extend the railroad through the steep gulch, terminating about seven miles south of Tacoma near South 97th Street in a grove of virgin timber that is now the Midland neighborhood.

== Economic problems ==
In 1892, a massive fire had destroyed the Hart Brothers' Tacoma sawmill. They attempted to salvage their commercial assets by leveraging their real estate holdings with ill-conceived bank notes. Although considered an accepted practice, the timing could not have been worse as the economic Panic of 1893 spelled the eventual doom of the Hart Brothers and their far-flung enterprises. During this period of decline and decay, the Tacoma Eastern Railroad languished until the economy rebounded with the free-spending days of the Yukon Gold Rush of 1899.

The Panic of 1893 coupled with their outstanding debt, financially ruined John and George Hart. Their last known sighting was on November 4, 1898, when a process server served summons to the brothers. Neither responded to the summons and it is suspected that they moved to Alaska, a common practice for indebted men to escape their debts.

== Independent corporate control and the Mount Rainier National Park ==
Under the direction of the court-appointed bankruptcy receivers Ladd and Tilton Bank of Portland, Oregon, new life was breathed into the railroad. To facilitate the rehabilitation of the railroad, the bank turned to Michigan entrepreneur John Bagley. Bagley had owned and operated logging companies, sawmills, railroads, and a hotel. In 1899, the year that Mount Rainier National Park was established, Bagley was made president of the Tacoma Eastern and set out to push the railroad another 60 miles to Ashford, Washington, the western gateway to the park. With construction financing covertly provided by the Chicago, Milwaukee, and St. Paul Railway, construction activities began in earnest. Unlike transcontinental railroad construction in America, the Tacoma Eastern Railroad was built with common labor provided mostly by Japanese, not Chinese, immigrants. The last spike on the passenger line was driven at Ashford in the fall of 1904. However, the main freight line diverged away to the south and would not be completed until it pushed into Morton, Washington in 1910, another 15 miles away. In 1894, Charles B. Wright proposed plans to build a railroad from Tacoma to the high shoulder of Mount Rainier. Large organized efforts by the Northern Pacific as well as Washington State legislators to establish a national park around Mount Rainier had been ongoing since 1890. Charles Wright and a team of workers from his time at Northern Pacific, collaborated with John F. Hart and his brother to construct a passenger railroad line from Tacoma to Mount Rainier, anticipating the prospective tourism that would likely come with the establishment of a national park. Before construction could finish, the Panic of 1893 and Charles Wright's death in 1897 effectively halted the project.

Despite the fact the Northern Pacific Railroad had lobbied Congress and conducted a land swap with the Secretary of the Interior to expedite the formation of Mount Rainier National Park, the Tacoma Eastern Railroad managed to provide the best access for park visitors. In 1904, rail line construction had reached Ashford, and by 1905 regular passenger services had been established. The Tacoma Eastern Railroad enjoyed virtually exclusive rail access to the scenic wonders of the mountain. With the railroad's arrival, Mount Rainier National Park would be profoundly changed. This was evident in the summer of 1905 when three of the nation's largest mountaineering clubs in America combined for a massive push to summit Mount Rainier. Until this point, access to the mountain was only achieved by horseback. The average tourist stay at the park was about a month. With rail passenger service from Tacoma taking about three hours, Mount Rainier National Park was now opened to a larger market of visitors, including those who were inclined to stay only a day.

After reaching Ashford in 1905, 62 miles of the Tacoma Eastern rail had been constructed. In its first year of operation, roughly 32,000 tickets were purchased. For $6, a passenger from Tacoma could leave at 9 o'clock and reach Ashford by noon. By 1911, over ~100,000 passengers had traveled through the Tacoma Eastern Railroad. From the opening of its passenger service to 1910, The Tacoma Eastern Railroad had expanded its worth by 75%, from $2,791,260 to $3,682,855. By 1920, the transportation service was expanded to include upscale rail cars and bus services from Ashford to Paradise. Services were also expanded to Seattle, and by 1924, it was feasible to take a day trip from Seattle to Paradise.

As automobiles became more popular in America, the railroad stepped up efforts to ensure that it held on to its stake in the tourist transportation market by offering rides in open-topped motorized hacks. These machines were the precursor to comfortable auto-stages and the price of riding these contraptions was eventually included in the train fare. For many visitors to the area, this was their first opportunity to ride in an automobile, even if it was slow, prone to mechanical failure, and offered no protection from the elements. By 1933, the bus and automobile competition effectively brought the passenger service to a halt.

Systematically, the auto-stages (and eventually the automobile) pushed aside the railroad as the primary means of passenger traffic. However, what the Tacoma Eastern Railroad became famous for was not moving passengers, but moving large quantities of timber. Ninety percent of all freight hauled by the railroad was extricated from the forests beneath Mount Rainier. Forty- and fifty-car trains were loaded with logs, lumber, cedar bolts, shingles, cordwood, wood pulp and delicately crafted wood trim. Of these materials, the logs were the most prevalent and many of these train cars were loaded with one enormous log that measured eight feet or more in diameter at the butt and could weigh 40 tons. These massive logs were euphemistically referred to as "Tacoma Toothpicks".

As the Tacoma Eastern Railroad's secret benefactor, the Chicago, Milwaukee and St. Paul Railway, was building their Pacific extension to Tacoma, the Tacoma Eastern was tasked with developing a new rail line between the communities of Frederickson and McKenna. Ultimately, through mergers and acquisitions, this line would become a vital link between Seattle and Portland, Oregon. Eventually this line would serve an important role in shipping explosives, bombs and military equipment to and from Fort Lewis, Washington.

First-person accounts of life on the Tacoma Eastern Railroad in those early days can be found in the riveting tales of the life of Harry French in a biography called Railroadman. Written by his son Chauncey Del French, Harry French was a two-fisted, hard-drinking, railroad boomer who by the age of 40 had accumulated over 25 years of service with various railroads. French's account of his father's life reads like pulp-fiction, and indeed Chauncey Del French made many pulp-fiction contributions to detective magazines under an assumed name. However, the accounts found in Railroadman have been researched and verified for accuracy.

== Subsidiary control ==
By July 1909, the Chicago, Milwaukee and St. Paul openly assumed control of the railroad. Even though the Tacoma Eastern now had its headquarters in Chicago, it operated as an independent subsidiary of the parent road for nearly ten years.

Nicknamed the Milwaukee Road, the new controlling corporation initially thought to expand into the Pacific Northwest in order to compete with other large railroad corporations. The Milwaukee Road would go on to modernize the Tacoma Eastern and other subsidiaries, by pioneering long distance diesel, electric, and steam propulsion trains in the Puget Sound.

The only President to have ridden the rails of the Tacoma Eastern was William Howard Taft. In 1911, President Taft came to Tacoma specifically to visit Mount Rainier National Park. Taft arrived in early October, but an early snow storm had preceded his arrival by a few days, making the presidential trip rather arduous. The train trip took two and a half hours from Tacoma to Ashford. Upon his arrival, he continued in a motor carriage followed by a rather long entourage of escorting dignitaries and one car loaded with mechanics to ensure that the unreliable carriages kept running. Accompanying the President was a team of horses used to effect an extraction of the presidential motor coach when it became stuck in the rutted and frozen muck. Wanting to see as much as possible, President Taft insisted that his driver take him from Longmire Springs, where warm accommodations awaited, up to Paradise. Before arriving at Paradise, the presidential car was so stuck that it was thought that the president may have to spend the night on the mountain. Taft took the discomfort in stride and managed to make his way to Paradise, if only for a moment, before having to turn back for his train. By now, the presidential entourage was spread across the mountainside for miles. Taft arrived back at the train over an hour late but told the train crew to delay the departure for at least a half-hour more to give his entourage an opportunity to catch the last train back to Tacoma. Stragglers faced the daunting prospect of riding back to Tacoma in the freezing cold or spending the night at one of the hotels on the mountain until the train returned in the morning.

At the dawn of the First World War, most all American railroads were federalized the day after Christmas, 1917. President Woodrow Wilson seized control of the railroads despite efforts on the part of railroad tycoons to standardize schedules and supply much needed freight cars for the war effort in Europe. Walker Hines was appointed the Director-General of the US Railroad Administration. Under his direction, the USRA set construction standards, lifted tariffs, and consolidated passenger services, all for the purposes of moving soldiers and machinery as efficiently as possible. Once the war was over and the USRA disbanded, control of the Tacoma Eastern Railroad was returned to the Chicago, Milwaukee, St. Paul and Pacific. Immediately thereafter, on December 31, 1918, the Tacoma Eastern Railroad's assets were consolidated and its identity absorbed by the parent railroad.

== Recent history ==
The Tacoma Eastern became known as the National Park branch of the Chicago, Milwaukee, St. Paul and Pacific Railroad. Between 1919 and 1980, the National Park branch would consistently be ranked the second most economically viable branch in the entire 1700-mile Milwaukee Road system. However, on March 15, 1980, the Milwaukee Road became the single largest railroad failure in American history. The former Tacoma Eastern portion of the railroad was conveyed to the Weyerhaeuser Corporation who used the line to move logs from Thurston and Lewis counties to a trans-loading facility at the Port of Tacoma for international export.

=== Mount Rainier Scenic Railroad ===
Weyerhaeuser Corporation operated the line almost exclusively for twelve years. The only other railroad activity the Weyerhaeuser Corporation tolerated was the development of the Mount Rainier Scenic Railroad. The Mount Rainier Scenic Railroad was the brainchild of L. T. "Tom" Murray Jr., President of the Murray Pacific Corporation. The Mount Rainier Scenic was, and is today, an excursion road that shuttles passengers about seven miles on former Tacoma Eastern tracks through the foothills of Mount Rainier using antique train equipment. The primary emphasis of the Mount Rainier Scenic Railroad's historic collection is logging railroad equipment. The Mount Rainier Scenic Railroad has grown since 1980 from being a one-locomotive railroad to the world's only rail heritage group with one of each type of logging locomotive in working order.

Geared locomotives

Geared locomotives were built for power, not for speed, and were popular with logging companies who had to move heavy trains up and down grades safely. Four types of logging locomotives were utilized in the early twentieth century: the common rod engine, the Shay, the Heisler, and the Climax locomotives. The rod configuration has steam pistons which actuate rods attached to the wheels which, in turn, provide locomotion. The Shay configured geared-locomotive had two or more pistons that are mounted perpendicular to the boiler. Instead of actuating rods for locomotion, the pistons turned a crankshaft which ran the length of the engine on one side and engaged each of the wheels with a crown gear. The Heisler configured geared-locomotive always had two pistons cradling the boiler and is mounted to a central axle. This central axle was attached to the locomotive wheels much like a modern truck. The rarest of the logging locomotives is the Climax configured geared-locomotive. Climax locomotives have pistons that flank the boiler at a 45-degree angle. These pistons turn a flywheel which is connected to a central axle, thus providing locomotion. All of these geared locomotives are rare but there are only three Climax engines that can be seen today in working order.

=== The Boeing Train ===
Eventually, economic development led to the need for further rail activity on the sparsely used Tacoma Eastern. The Boeing Company, with plants all along Puget Sound, finally submitted to political pressure at the federal, state and local levels to site a production facility in Pierce County. Frederickson, a station on the old Tacoma Eastern line, was chosen as the preferred location. Here the Boeing Company constructed a massive aircraft wing assembly plant. The Weyerhaeuser Corporation had no interest in restructuring its railroad for common carrier service, but did allow a subcontractor to operate on 12 miles of track from Tacoma Junction to Frederickson. As early as 1980, Weyerhaeuser began contracting cars from its subsidiary, the Chehalis Western Railroad, to the City of Tacoma Until 1998, rail operations by the contractor were commonly referred to as simply "The Boeing Train". Weyerhaeuser ceased all rail operations in the south Puget Sound basin by 1992 and began selling off segments of the former Tacoma Eastern Railroad to the City of Tacoma.

=== Tacoma Rail ===
In November 1998, with the purchase of the railroad complete, contracts with the private rail operators were cancelled. Now the responsibility for operating and marketing the line fell to the City of Tacoma's railroad: the Tacoma Municipal Belt Line Railway. With the addition of the former Tacoma Eastern right-of-way, the City of Tacoma re-organized its railroad corporation and shortened its name to simply "Tacoma Rail". Since 1998, many miles of track have been rehabilitated and the number of rail customers has increased. In corporate literature, such as press releases and timetables, the former Tacoma Eastern is referred to as "The Mountain Division". Today, Tacoma Rail trains traverse the steep slopes of the Tacoma Eastern gulch bound for Fredrickson with carloads of lumber, aluminum, steel pipe, heavy machinery and grain. On alternate days, the train returns with aluminum briquettes, cedar fencing and siding.

== Plans ==
In an effort to reduce the carbon footprint and alleviate traffic and parking congestion, plans are in the works to re-introduce passenger excursion service from Tacoma to Mount Rainier National Park.
