= Spokane, Portland and Seattle class L-2 =

L-2
Type and origin
- Power type: Steam
- Builder: Hinkley Locomotive Works
- Build date: December 1881
Specifications
- Configuration
  - Whyte: 4-4-0
- Gauge: 4 ft 8 1/2 in (1,435 mm)
- Driver dia.: 57 in
- Loco weight: 63,600 lb
- Fuel type: Oil
- Boiler pressure: 125 lbf/in²
- Cylinders: 2
- Cylinder size: 16x24 Inches
Performance figures
- Tractive effort: 12,826 lbf
Career
- Operators: Spokane, Portland and Seattle Railway
- Class: L-2
- Numbers: 51
- Locale: United States
- Disposition: Wrecked on June 12, 1916

Spokane, Portland and Seattle Railway's Class L-2 was a class of 4-4-0 steam locomotives.
