= Milwaukee Road class S3 =

Class of steam locomotives

Milwaukee Road S3 class
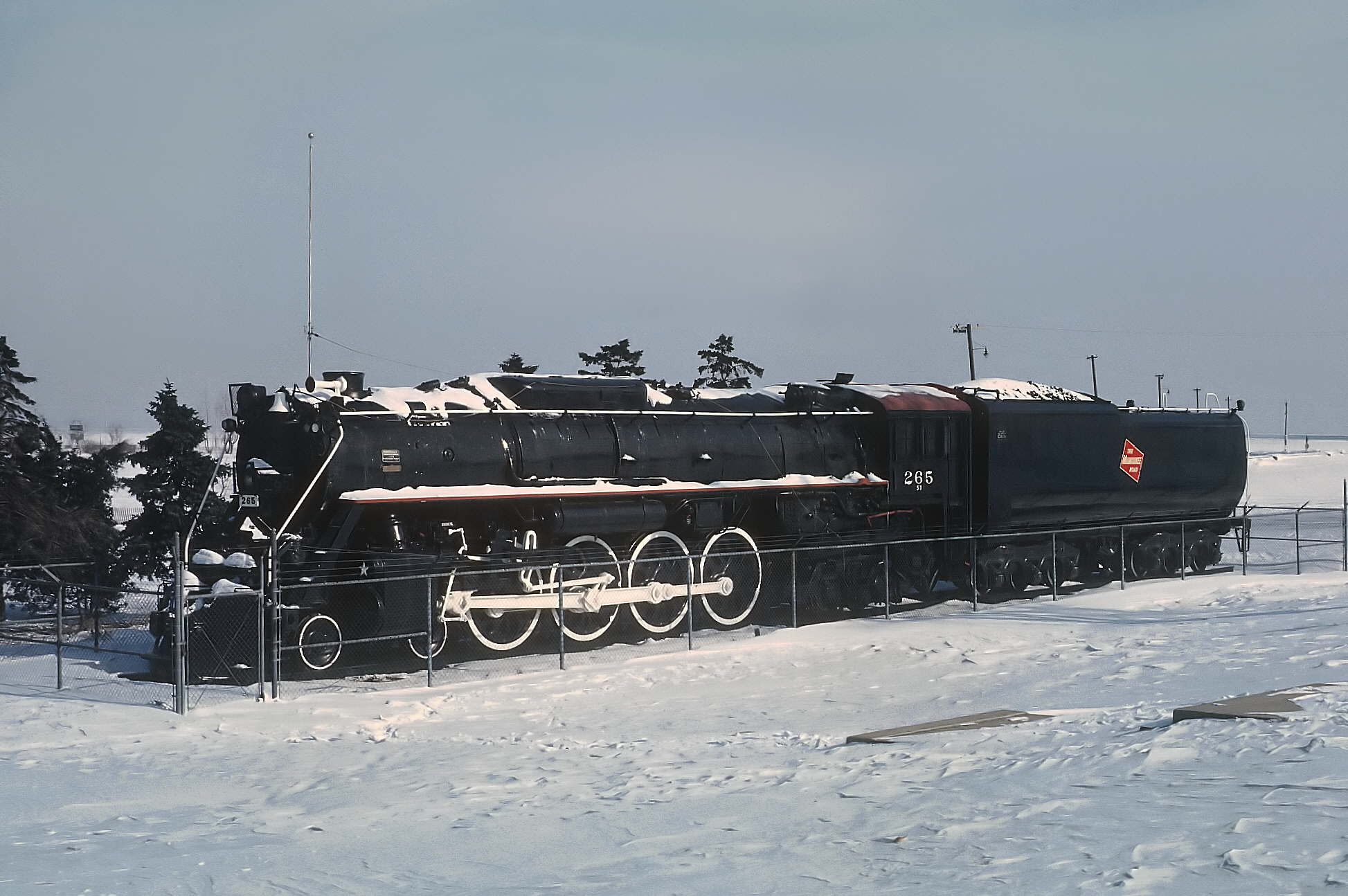
- MILW 265 on display in Milwaukee, Wisconsin in early 1966.
Type and origin
- Power type: Steam
- Builder: American Locomotive Company
- Order number: S-1928
- Serial number: 71973–71982
- Build date: July–September 1944
- Total produced: 10
Specifications
- Configuration
  - Whyte: 4-8-4
  - UIC: 2′D2′ h2
- Gauge: 4 ft 8 1/2 in (1,435 mm) standard gauge
- Leading dia.: 36 in (914 mm)
- Driver dia.: 74 in (1,880 mm)
- Trailing dia.: 38 in (965 mm) (lead axle); 44 in (1,118 mm) (trail axle)
- Wheelbase: Loco & tender: 95.54 ft (29.12 m)
- Length: 109 ft 7 3/4 in (33.42 m)
- Height: 15 ft 6 in (4.72 m)
- Axle load: 64,825 lb (32.413 short tons)
- Adhesive weight: 259,300 pounds (129.7 short tons)
- Loco weight: 460,000 pounds (230 short tons)
- Tender weight: 364,100 pounds (182.1 short tons)
- Total weight: 824,100 pounds (412.1 short tons)
- Tender type: Water-bottom
- Fuel type: Coal
- Fuel capacity: 25 short tons (23,000 kg)
- Water cap.: 20,000 US gal (76,000 L; 17,000 imp gal)
- Firebox
  - Grate area: 96.20 sq ft (8.937 m^{2})
- Boiler pressure: 250 psi (1,700 kPa)
- Safety valve: Pop
- Cylinders: Two, outside
- Cylinder size: 26 in × 32 in (660 mm × 813 mm)
- Valve gear: Walschaert
- Valve type: Piston valves
- Loco brake: Air
- Train brakes: Air
- Couplers: Knuckle
Performance figures
- Maximum speed: 100 mph (160 km/h)
- Power output: 4,500 hp (3,400 kW)
- Tractive effort: 62,119 lbf (276.32 kN)
- Factor of adh.: 4.17
Career
- Operators: Milwaukee Road
- Class: S3
- Numbers: 260–269
- Retired: 1954-1956
- Preserved: Two (No. 261 and No. 265)
- Disposition: No. 261 in operational condition, No. 265 on display, remainder scrapped

The Milwaukee Road S3 Class was a class of 10 4-8-4 "Northern" type steam locomotives built by the American Locomotive Company in 1944 and operated by the Milwaukee Road until the mid 1950s. The locomotives saw service in pulling freight and passenger trains throughout the Milwaukee Road.

As of 2026, two S3s are preserved, No. 261 is in operating condition and No. 265 is on display at the Illinois Railway Museum in Union, Illinois.

== History ==
=== Background ===
In 1944, amidst a wartime motive power shortage, the Milwaukee Road wanted to order EMD FT diesel sets, having acquired their first four-unit set in October 1941, and their second in July 1943, but the War Production Board (WPB) only allowed them to order six more sets and prohibited them from ordering more. Instead of additional FTs, the railroad was allocated ten 4-8-4 steam locomotives from the American Locomotive Company (ALCO). These were delivered in July and September 1944, and were classified as the S3 (Nos. 260–269) by the Milwaukee Road.

=== Design and construction ===
Since the WPB has placed a moratorium on creating completely new designs, locomotive manufacturers compromised by reusing features from pre-existing designs, and ALCO drafted the S3 with features reused from other 4-8-4 classes.

The S3 design was similar to the Milwaukee Road's preceding Baldwin-built S2 class (Nos. 201–240) locomotives from 1937, but the frame was based from the Chicago, Rock Island and Pacific (Rock Island) R67B class, while the boiler was based from the Delaware and Hudson K-62 class. The tender, which was based from the Union Pacific FEF-1 class, was a water-bottom type with a pair of six-wheel trucks.

The 96.20 square feet (8.937 m^{2}) of coal-burning grate supplied heat to the boiler, which was pressed at 250 psi (1.72 MPa). This supplied steam to the cylinders which had a bore of 26 inches (660 mm) and a stroke of 32 inches (813 mm). They were connected to the 74-inch (1,879.600 mm) diameter driving wheels by Walschaerts valve gear, and they were equipped with roller bearings. The S3s were also built with then-innovative mechanical devices, such as Franklin self-adjusting spring-loaded wedges and ALCO lateral motion devices. They were also equipped with an air horn.

All ten S3s were built by ALCO's Schenectady plant in July (7) and September 1944 (3). ALCO assigned order number S-1928 and serial numbers 71973 through 71982.

=== Service ===
The S3s, along with the S2 and S1 classes, were all assigned by the Milwaukee Road as dual service locomotives, pulling both heavy freight and passenger trains. Initially, the S3s only operated east of the electrified Pacific Extension, being allocated to the Dubuque and Illinois Division (now the Canadian Pacific Kansas City Elgin Subdivision) between Chicago, Illinois and Omaha, Nebraska.

Later in service, the S3s were modified with automatic train stop systems and cab signals for passenger runs between Chicago and the Twin Cities in Minnesota. In the early 1950s, when the Korean War broke out, additional locomotives were needed to accommodate a traffic surge in the Idaho Division, so four S3s (Nos. 262, 263, 267 and 269) were converted to oil firing and sent west to work passenger and freight trains in the gap—between Avery, Idaho and Othello, Washington—in between the railroad's two electrified routes.

By March 1954, No. 260 had been transferred to the La Crosse and River Division, and No. 261 was on the Milwaukee Division; the other four coal-burners were still on the D&I Division, and the four oil-burners on the Idaho Division.

By December 1954, all the S3s were removed from service, as the Milwaukee Road was effectively dieselized. As the equipment trusts on the ten locomotives had yet to expire, they could not be scrapped or sold, so they were placed into storage – the Idaho four going to Tacoma.

Table of locomotives.
No.	Alco serial number	Built	Retired	Notes
260	71973	July 1944	December 1954	
261	71974	July 1944	August 1956	Preserved
262	71975	July 1944	December 1954	Converted to burn oil
263	71976	July 1944	December 1954	Converted to burn oil
264	71977	July 1944	February 1956	
265	71978	July 1944	September 1956	Preserved
266	71979	July 1944	February 1956	
267	71980	September 1944	December 1954	Converted to burn oil
268	71981	September 1944	December 1954	
269	71982	September 1944	December 1954	Converted to burn oil

== Preservation ==
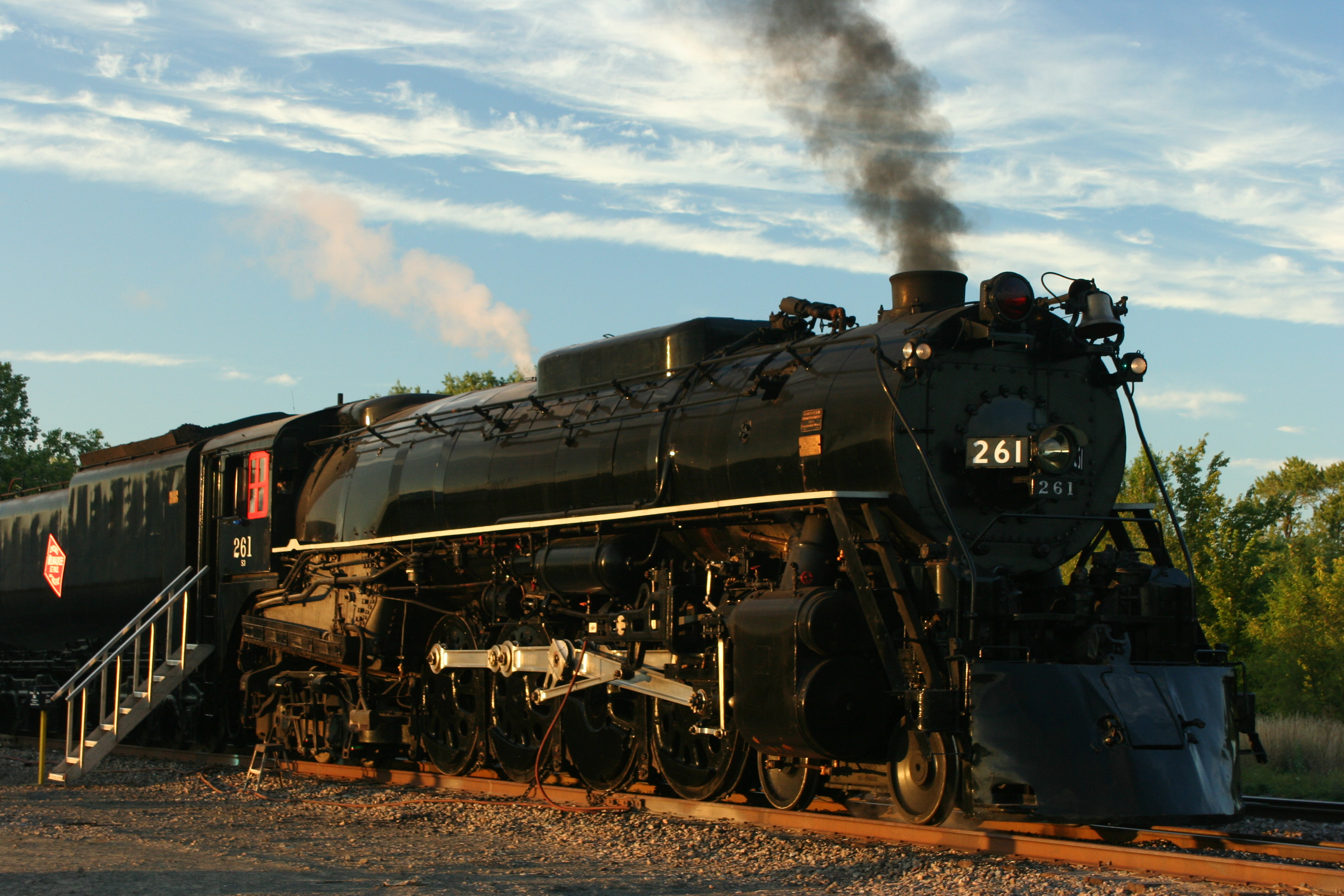
Milwaukee Road 261, the sole operational unit

Two S3s survived into preservation:

- Milwaukee Road 261 was retired in August 1956 and donated to the National Railroad Museum in Green Bay, Wisconsin in 1958. Today, the locomotive is owned, operated, and maintained by Minneapolis-based nonprofit organization Friends of the 261, which runs occasional and seasonal excursion trains using the locomotive.
- Milwaukee Road 265 was retired in September 1956 and donated to the city of Milwaukee, Wisconsin, where it sat on static display until 1975. The locomotive was then moved to the Illinois Railway Museum in Union, Illinois, where it currently resides.

== Bibliography ==
- Barrie, Wes. "Milwaukee Road 4-8-4 "Northern" Locomotives in the USA". steamlocomotive.com.
- Drury, George H. (1993), Guide to North American Steam Locomotives, Waukesha, Wisconsin: Kalmbach Publishing Company, ISBN 0-89024-206-2, LCCN 93041472
- Edson, William D. (Spring 1977). "Milwaukee Road Locomotives". Railroad History. 136 (136). Boston, Mass.: Railway and Locomotive Historical Society: 106. JSTOR 43523968.
- Holley, Noel T. (1987). The Milwaukee Electrics (1st ed.). Hicksville, New York: N. J. International Inc. pp. 196–197. ISBN 0-934088-14-4.
- Smith, Mark (November–December 1993). "Preservation News — The Big Locomotives". Locomotive & Railway Preservation (L&RP). No. 44. Pentrex. pp. 7–10.
- Stauss, William F (2001). The Milwaukee Road in Color Volume 4: Iowa, Missouri, Minnesota and the Dakotas. Scotch Plains, New Jersey: Morning Sun. ISBN 1-58248-058-3.
