= Milwaukee Road class EF-1 =

Class of electric locomotive

Milwaukee Road EF-1
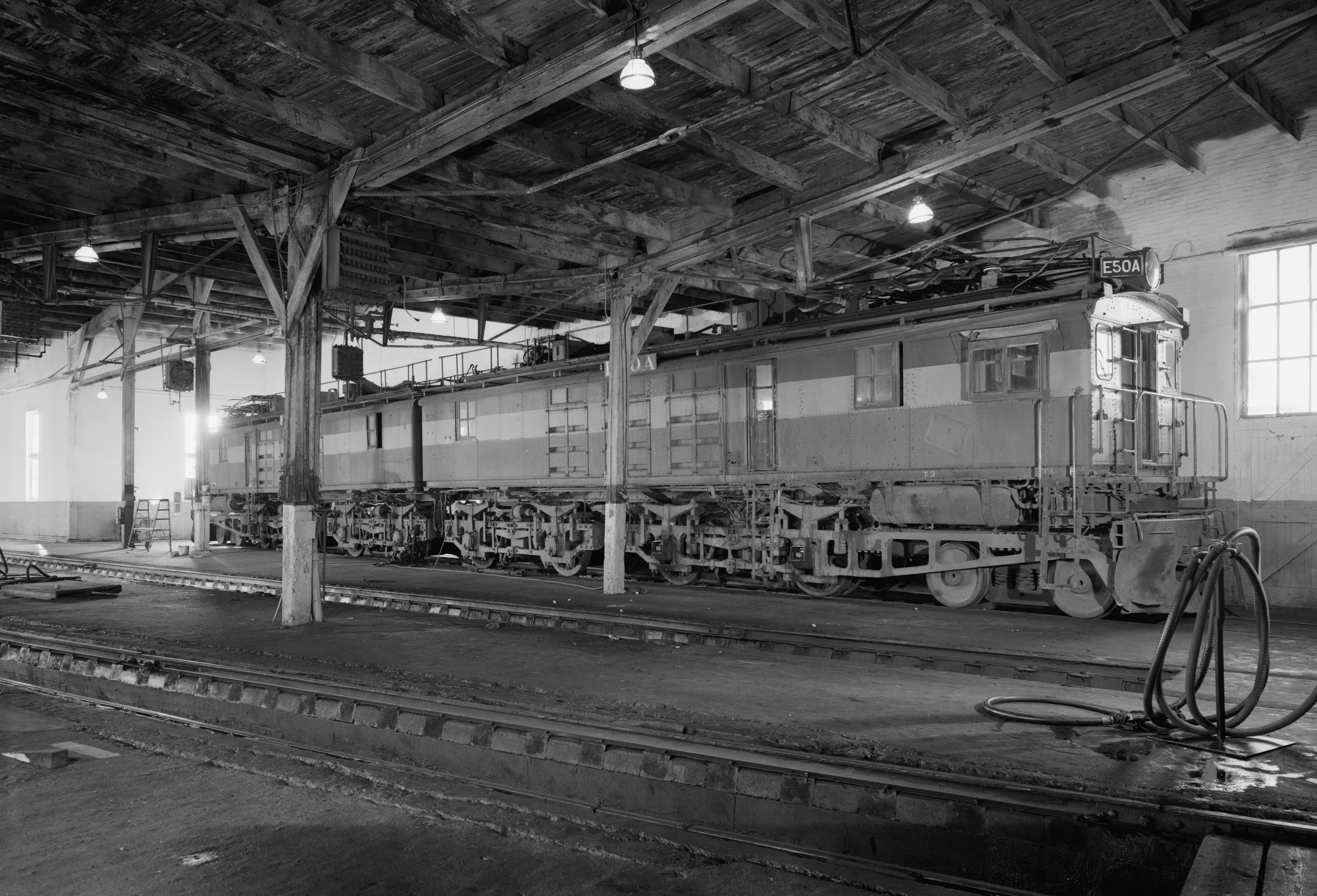
- EF-1 #E50 in the Deer Lodge, Montana engine house, October 1974
Type and origin
- Power type: Electric
- Builder: American Locomotive Company, General Electric
- Build date: 1915–1916
- Total produced: 42 locomotives (84 half-units)
Specifications
- Configuration
  - Whyte: 4-4-4-0+0-4-4-4OE
  - AAR: 2-B+B+B+B-2
  - UIC: (2′Bo)(Bo)+(Bo)(Bo2′)
- Gauge: 4 ft 8 1/2 in (1,435 mm) standard gauge
- Length: 112 ft
- Loco weight: 564,000 lb (256,000 kg; 256 t)
- Electric system/s: 3,000 V DC overhead catenary
- Current pickup: Pantograph
Performance figures
- Power output: Continuous: 3,340 hp (2.49 MW), One hour: 4,100 hp (3.06 MW)
Career
- Operators: Milwaukee Road
- Class: EP-1
- Locale: Northwest United States
- Retired: January 1951–June 1974
- Preserved: E50 (EF-1), E57B (ES-3)
- Disposition: 1 EF-1 and 1 ES-3 preserved, remainder scrapped

The Chicago, Milwaukee, St. Paul and Pacific Railroad (Milwaukee Road) classes EP-1 and EF-1 comprised 42 boxcab electric locomotives built by the American Locomotive Company (Alco) in 1915. Electrical components were from General Electric. The locomotives were composed of two half-units semi-permanently coupled back-to-back, and numbered as one unit with 'A' and 'B' suffixes. As built, 30 locomotives were assigned to freight service, classified as EF-1 and numbered 10200–10229. The remaining twelve locomotives were assigned to passenger service as class EP-1, numbered 10100–10111, with higher-speed passenger gearing. The design was highly successful, replacing a much larger number of steam locomotives, cutting costs and improving schedules. General Electric self-proclaimed this electric locomotive to be the “King of the Rails” in a silent promotional film from 1915.

In 1919, with the arrival of a newer generation of passenger power, the EP-1 locomotives were converted to EF-1 freight locomotives, and renumbered 10230–10241. In this role, they served until the 1950s, when the arrival of the Little Joe locomotives began to replace them in freight service.

== Technical information ==
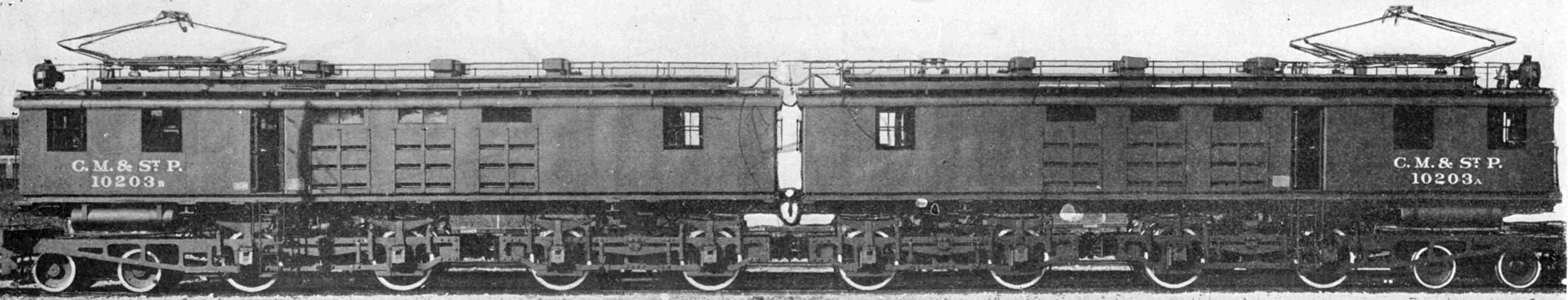
EF-1 #10203, as new.

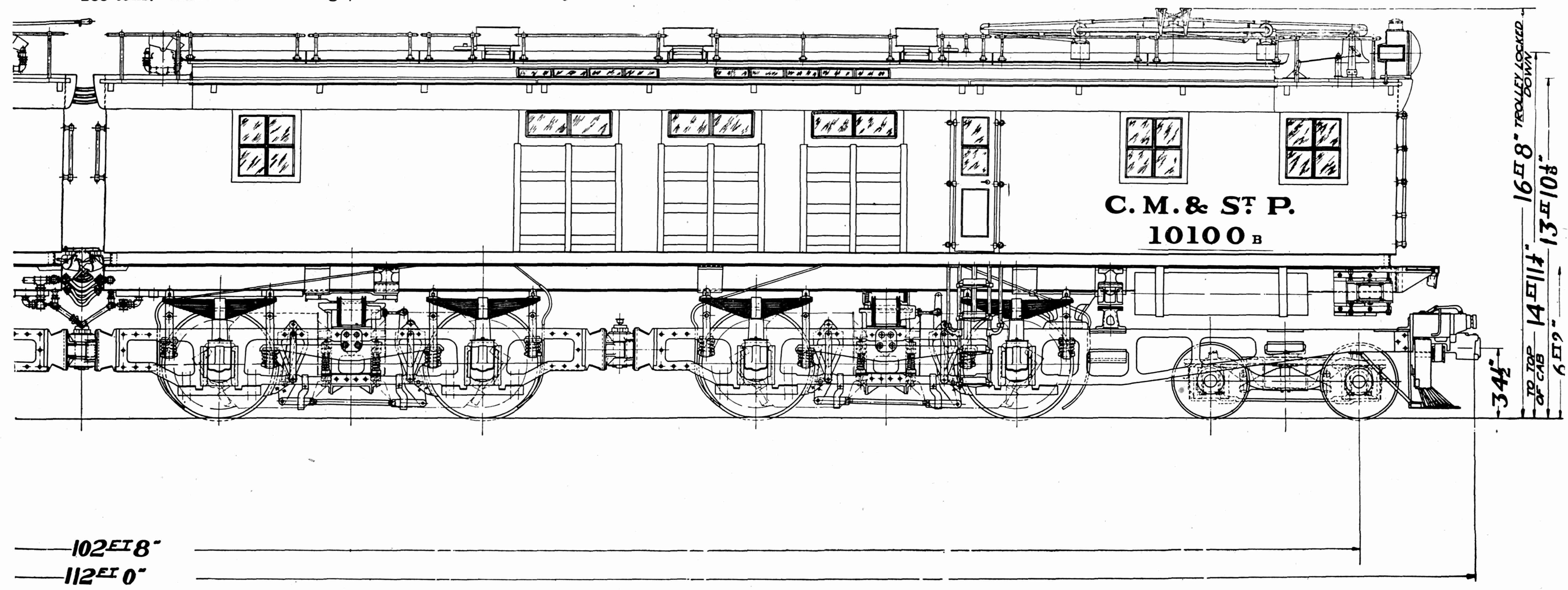
EF-1 side-view drawing.

They were fitted with multiple-unit train control systems, and could thus be joined together into larger sets and operated from a single control station. They were also retrofitted with a special multiple unit control system designed by an electrical engineer of The Milwaukee Road. This enabled the crew of a boxcab to control trailing diesel electric locomotives. However, the EF-4 "Little Joes", which were also retrofitted, were more often seen leading diesel electrics than boxcabs, which had by then been largely relegated to the role of helper engine.

The maximum speed of an EF-1 as built was 35 miles per hour (56 km/h). Higher speeds led to excessive strain on the traction motor armatures. The rebuilding programme of the 1950s raised this to 45 miles per hour (72 km/h) to help maintain faster schedules.

The two powered trucks were connected together with a ball-and-socket joint, and the couplers were also attached to the trucks. The bodywork, therefore, did not take the load of the train. Each truck had outside bar frames, allowing more room for the traction motors and equipment. The front powered truck's frames extended forward and carried an outrigger truck and the heavy snowplows the units bore.

== EF-2, EF-3, EF-5 and ES-3 ==
In the 1930s, with train tonnage increasing, the Milwaukee began to create three-unit locomotives out of the boxcab units. A simple combination of three was classified EF-2. Twelve EF-2s were assembled, and renumbered 10500–10511ACB. On these, the cab on the center (C) unit was unnecessary and just added weight and length. The center units were therefore shortened by removing the cab, the pilot truck and the frame extension; these were nicknamed "bobtails". These were assembled in between two standard units to create EF-3 sets. These "bobtail" units weighed 52,000 lb (23.6 t) less than a regular unit. Additional EF-2s were created, but no more were modified into "bobtails". The locomotives were renumbered in 1939, the EF-3s being numbered E25–E36, and the EF-1s E50–E73.

In 1951, five four-unit locomotives were created; these were classified EF-5 and could have any combination of regular or bobtail units in the center two positions. Their numbers gradually increased until 10 were in service in 1961.

When an odd number of EF-2s were created, a single boxcab unit became surplus. This unit was classified as a heavy switcher and given class ES-3. That same ES-3 (E57B) is now preserved.

== EP-1A ==
In 1953, two EF-1 locomotives, E69A/B and E28A/B were converted back into passenger service as class EP-1A to help the aging Bi-Polars on the Puget Sound Extension. The first to receive this treatment was E69, which became E22A/B. During the rebuilding process, they received steam generators, engine trucks from scrapped F7 Hudsons, and high speed gearing. E28 soon followed a few months later and emerged as E23A/B. E22A and E23A received some smoothing of their appearances, including somewhat "streamlined" cab fronts. They were later repainted into the Union Pacific Railroad scheme of Armour Yellow with Harbor Mist Gray roofs, and red dividing lines. After rebuilding, they could develop 4,500 hp (3,400 kW). These two locomotives served until March 1961 in this role; at which time, the E23A and E23B were renumbered E22D and E22C. The EP-1a's all became a part of EF-5 E22A/B/C/D until 1966 when E22C was wrecked and the 3 remaining units operated as A/B/D set. E22A/B/D was finally scrapped in 1973.

== Retirements ==
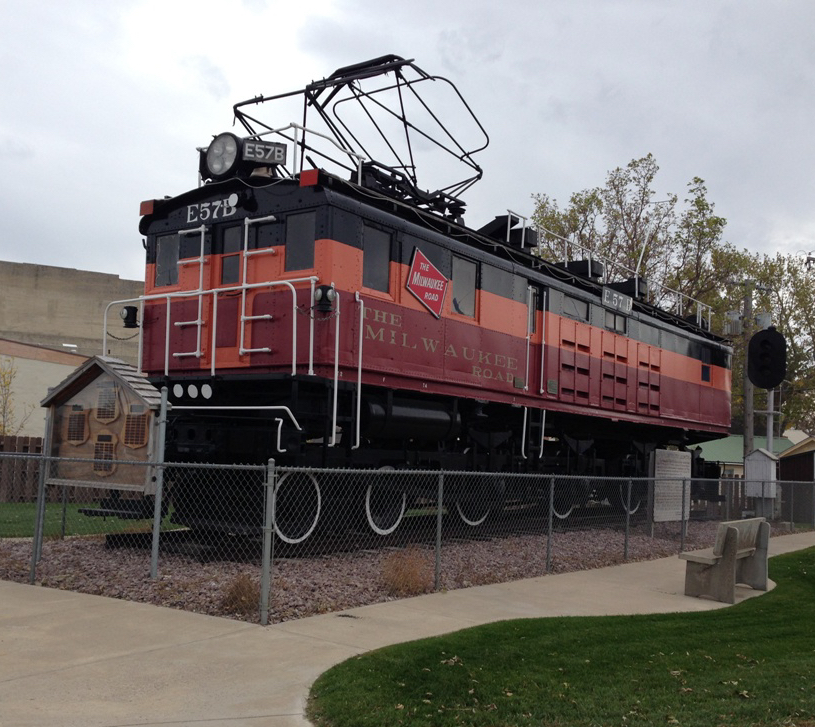
Unit E57B in Harlowton, MT

The fleet stayed intact until 1951, when two EF-1s were retired – E51A+B and E68A+B. Two units of an EF-2 were retired in 1954, and the remaining numbers held steady until the mid-1960s, when old age began to take its toll. Locomotives were patched up until unrepairable, and units within were swapped between locomotives without being renumbered.

Most were retired by the end of 1973, but one unit, E57B and its "bobtail" companion, were kept in service as the Harlowton, Montana, switcher until June 1974.

== Today ==
Unit E50A+B, originally 10200A+B, the first locomotive built, still survives and is preserved at the Lake Superior Railroad Museum in Duluth, Minnesota. Unit E57B, originally 10211B, is now preserved at Harlowton, Montana. Both are on static display.
