= Milwaukee Road class A2 =

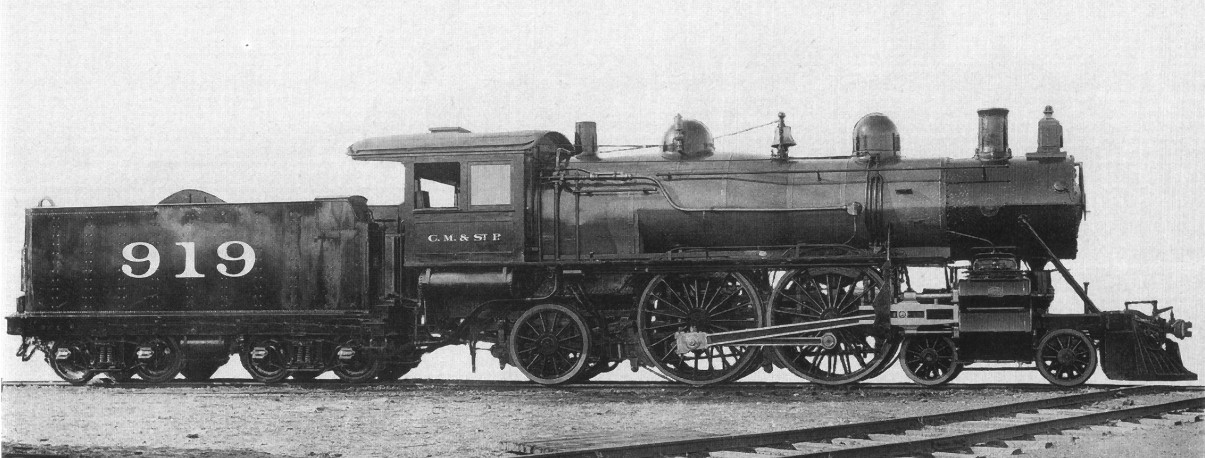
Type and origin
- Power type: Steam
- Builder: Baldwin Locomotive Works
- Build date: 1901–1909
Specifications
- Configuration
  - Whyte: 4-4-2
  - UIC: 2′B1′ v4
- Gauge: 4 ft 8 1/2 in (1,435 mm)
- Driver dia.: 84–85 in (2,134–2,159 mm)
- Boiler pressure: 200–220 lbf/in^{2} (1.38–1.52 MPa)
- Cylinders: 4 (Vauclain compound)
- High-pressure cylinder: 15 in × 28 in (381 mm × 711 mm)
- Low-pressure cylinder: 25 in × 28 in (635 mm × 711 mm)
Performance figures
- Tractive effort: 20,420–22,190 lbf (90.83–98.71 kN)
Career
- Operators: Milwaukee Road
- Class: A2, A2-a, A2-b, A2-c, A2
- Number in class: 47
- Scrapped: 1927–1930
- Disposition: All scrapped

The Milwaukee Road's A2 class comprised 47 compound steam locomotives of the 4-4-2 or 'Atlantic' configuration. The Milwaukee Road acquired them in five batches.

The first two batches of 9 and 19 locomotives (classes A2 and A2-a) were built by Baldwin Locomotive Works, and were Vauclain compound locomotives with 84 inches (2.13 m) drivers. The third batch (A2-b) of five locomotive was built by the Milwaukee Road in its Milwaukee, Wisconsin shops with 85 inches (2.159 m) drivers. The fourth batch (A2-c) of 12 engines was built by Baldwin as Vauclain compounds with 85 inches (2.159 m) drivers, while the last batch (A2) was for a pair of engines built by Baldwin as balanced compounds. All members of the class were scrapped between 1927 and 1930.
