= Milwaukee Road class L2 =

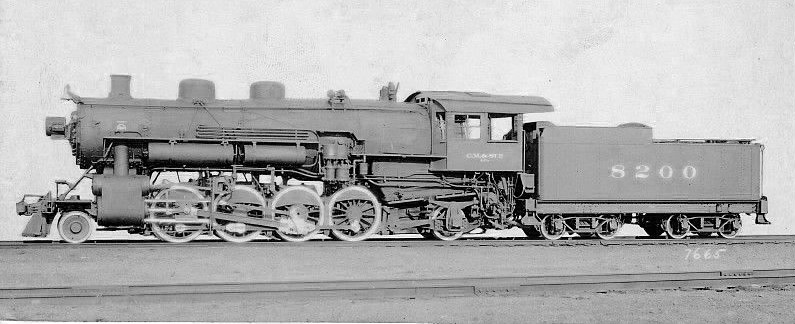
- Baldwin Locomotive Works’ photograph of L2-a No. 8200, later 500, construction no. 53596, Baldwin class 12-46-¼-E, 594; built August 1920, retired March 1953.
Type and origin
- Power type: Steam
- Builder: Milwaukee Road (40); American Locomotive Company (140); Baldwin Locomotive Works (200)
- Build date: L2: 1912–1914; L2-a: 1920; L2-b: 1922–1923
- Total produced: 380
Specifications
- Configuration
  - Whyte: 2-8-2
  - UIC: 1′D1′ h2
- Gauge: 4 ft 8 1/2 in (1,435 mm)
- Driver dia.: 63 in (1,600 mm)
- Adhesive weight: 216,000–220,000 lb (98–100 tonnes)
- Loco weight: 275,000–292,770 lb (124.74–132.80 tonnes)
- Fuel type: Coal
- Firebox
  - Grate area: 49 sq ft (4.6 m^{2})
- Boiler pressure: 200 lbf/in^{2} (1.38 MPa)
- Heating surface: 2,925–3,050 sq ft (271.7–283.4 m^{2})
- Superheater
  - Heating area: 640–685 sq ft (59.5–63.6 m^{2})
- Cylinders: Two
- Cylinder size: 26 in × 30 in (660 mm × 762 mm)
- Valve gear: L2, L2-b: Walschaerts; L2-a: Baker
- Loco brake: Air
- Train brakes: Air
Performance figures
- Tractive effort: 54,720 lbf (243.4 kN)
Career
- Operators: Milwaukee Road
- Class: L2, L2-a, and L2-b
- Number in class: L2: 180; L2-a: 100; L2-b: 100
- Numbers: 8000–8179, 8200–8399; renumbered 400–738 in 1938
- Retired: 1934 – 1956
- Disposition: All scrapped

The Milwaukee Road class L2 were 2-8-2 or "Mikado"-type steam locomotives built by or for the Chicago, Milwaukee, St. Paul and Pacific Railroad (“The Milwaukee Road”) in the period 1912–1923.

== Construction history ==
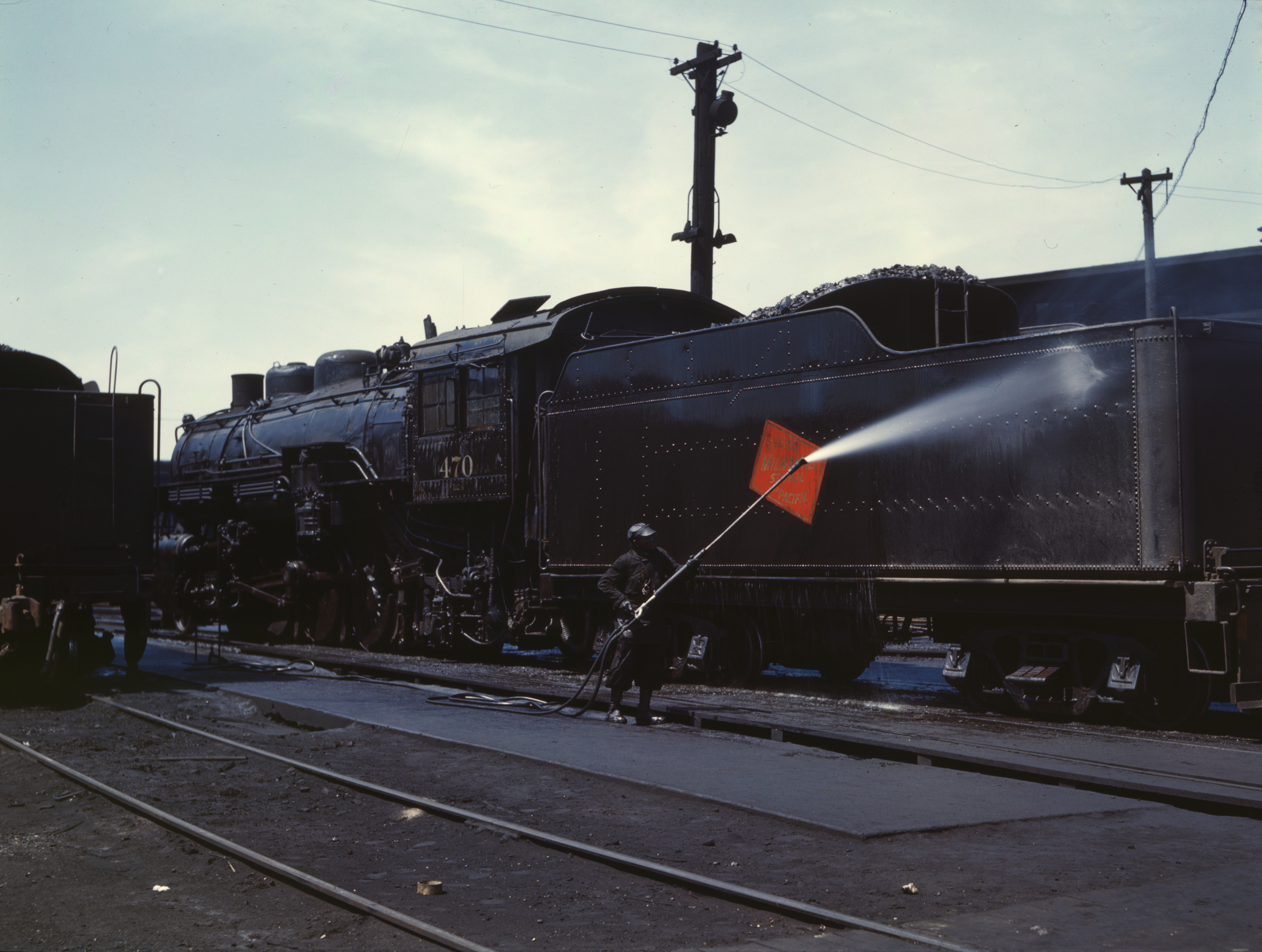
Cleaning an engine near the Milwaukee Road roundhouse, Bensenville, Illinois. Milwaukee Road 470 was class L2-b 2-8-2 built by Baldwin in 1923

There were three sub-classes of the class L2: the L2 proper comprised 40 locomotives, built by Milwaukee Road’s Milwaukee Shops in 1912–13, 115 by Alco’s Brooks Works in 1912, and 25 by Alco’s Schenectady Works in 1914. They were followed by 100 class L2-a built by Baldwin Locomotive Works in 1920, and 100 class L2-b in 1922, also built by Baldwin.

== Numbering ==
=== L2 ===
When originally built, the Milwaukee Shops locomotives had been allocated 1800–1839, however only the first seven carried these numbered before the allocation became 8000–8039. Similarly, only the first 50 Brooks locomotives received their 1840–1889 numbers, before their allocation was changed to 8040–8154. The Schenectady engines were numbered 8155–8179.

Sixty-nine L2 locomotives received mechanical stokers and were reclassified as class L2-r. At the Milwaukee Road’s 1938 renumbering, the remaining 62 L2-r locomotives were renumbered 600–661, with the remaining 77 non-stoker fitted L2 locomotives receiving numbers 662–738.

=== L2-a ===
The 100 L2-a locomotives were built by the Baldwin Locomotive Works as 8200–8299, and became 500–599 in 1938.

=== L2-b ===
The 100 L2-b locomotives were built by the Baldwin Locomotive Works as 8300–8399, and became 400–499 in 1938.

== Notes ==
Sadly, none of the L2 Mikados survived to preservation
