= Little Joe (electric locomotive) =

Class of General Electric locomotives

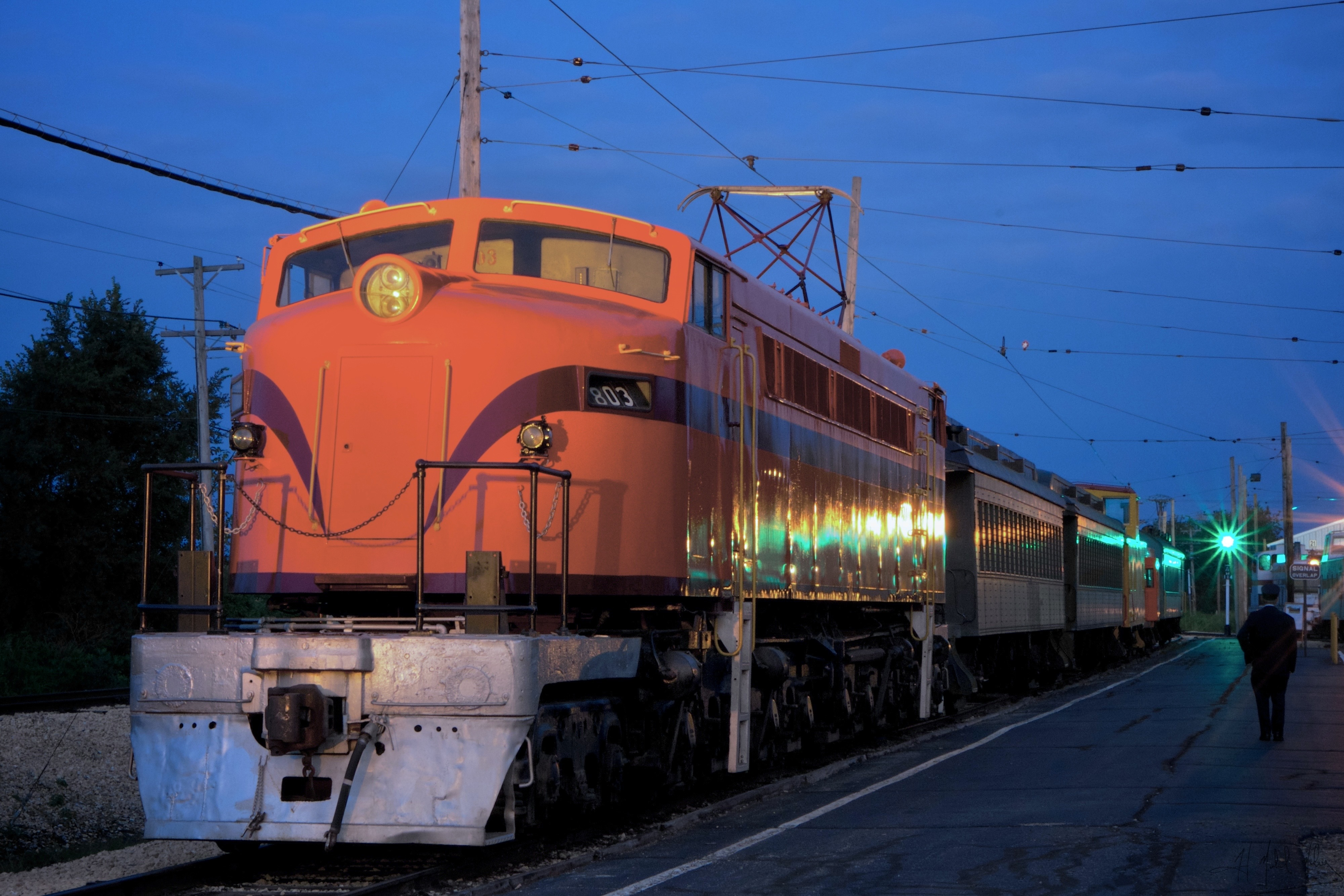
- South Shore 803 preserved at the Illinois Railway Museum
Type and origin
- Power type: Electric
- Builder: General Electric
- Serial number: 29913–29932
- Model: 2-D+D-2 406/546 8-GE 750-3300V
- Total produced: 20
Specifications
- Configuration
  - Whyte: 4-8-0+0-8-4OE
  - AAR: 2-D+D-2
  - UIC: (2′D)+(D2′)
- Bogies: Arch-bar
- Length: 88 ft 10 in (27.08 m)
- Width: 10 ft 7 in (3.23 m)
- Height: 14 ft 5 in (4.39 m)
- Adhesive weight: 406,000 lb (184,000 kg; 184 t)
- Loco weight: 545,600 lb (247,500 kg; 247.5 t)
- Electric system/s: 3,000–3,300 V DC; 1,500 V DC (South Shore)
- Current pickup: Two pantographs
- Traction motors: GE750 (8)
- Loco brake: Air, 8-EL
Performance figures
- Maximum speed: 68 mph (109 km/h)
- Power output: One hour: 5,530 hp (4.12 MW); Continuous: 5,110 hp (3.81 MW)
- Tractive effort
  - Starting: 110,000 lbf (490 kN)
  - Continuous: 77,000 lbf (340 kN)
Career
- Operators: Milwaukee Road (12); South Shore (3); Companhia Paulista de Estradas de Ferro (5)
- Numbers: E20, E21, E70–E79 (Milwaukee); 801–803 (South Shore); 450-454 (Companhia Paulista); 6451-6455 (FEPASA)
- Nicknames: Little Joe (Milwaukee); 800s (South Shore); Russa (Paulista and FEPASA)
- Disposition: Five preserved, fifteen scrapped

The "Little Joe" is a type of railroad electric locomotive built by General Electric. The locomotives had 12 axles, eight of them powered, in a 2-D+D-2 arrangement. They were originally intended to be exported to the Soviet Union and designed to operate on Soviet Railways (SZhD) 3,300-volt DC overhead line system. They were never exported to the Soviet Union due to rising political tensions. Only 20 were built, with 15 sold to domestic operators and five exported to Brazil.

== History ==
After World War II, the Soviet Railways continued its electrification program, this time targeting the Kropachyovo-Zlatoust-Chelyabinsk line of the South Urals Railway. As local factories were recovering from the war efforts, the Soviet government (then led by Joseph Stalin), ordered 20 of these locomotives. Known by their factory classification of GE 2-D+D-2 406/546 8-GE 750-3300V, in the Soviet Union, they would have received the classification of the A-series locomotive, with the A standing for Amerikanskiy elektrovoz (Russian: Американский электровоз), meaning "American electric locomotive". At the time, this was the world's strongest electric locomotive, with a power output of 4,320 kW (5,790 hp) being comparable to the Union Pacific Big Boy.

The locomotives were built by General Electric (GE) at Erie, Pennsylvania, with the supervision of Soviet specialists. The Ministry of Railways of the USSR was so confident about receiving these locomotives, that they were also allocated running numbers, initially 1591-1610 and later 2301-2320. The first test run of the locomotive (unit A1598) took place on September 7, 1948, on a test track of the New York Central Railroad.

GE built 20 locomotives of this type, but the company was prohibited from delivering them as relations between the United States and Soviet Union deteriorated into what became known as the Cold War. Fourteen were built to the Soviet gauge of 5 ft (1,524 mm) and the final six were built to 4 ft 8 1/2 in (1,435 mm) standard gauge.

The locomotives were never delivered because the State Department banned sales of strategic goods to the Soviet Union whilst production was underway. This included the electric locomotives, which were considered strategic to the Soviet Railways. Before the ban, the tensions between the US and USSR caused the Soviet railway engineers to be recalled back to their country. GE completed the locomotives, but they were left with no owner. Two were damaged during the trials. Although minimal, unit 29924 collided with unit 29923, causing significant damage to the leading axle.

The Soviet Union was then forced to design its own locomotive, the N8 (later VL8), which ran in 1953. This led to the development of the VL10 (3 kV DC) and VL80 (25 kV AC) locomotives.

=== Milwaukee Road ===
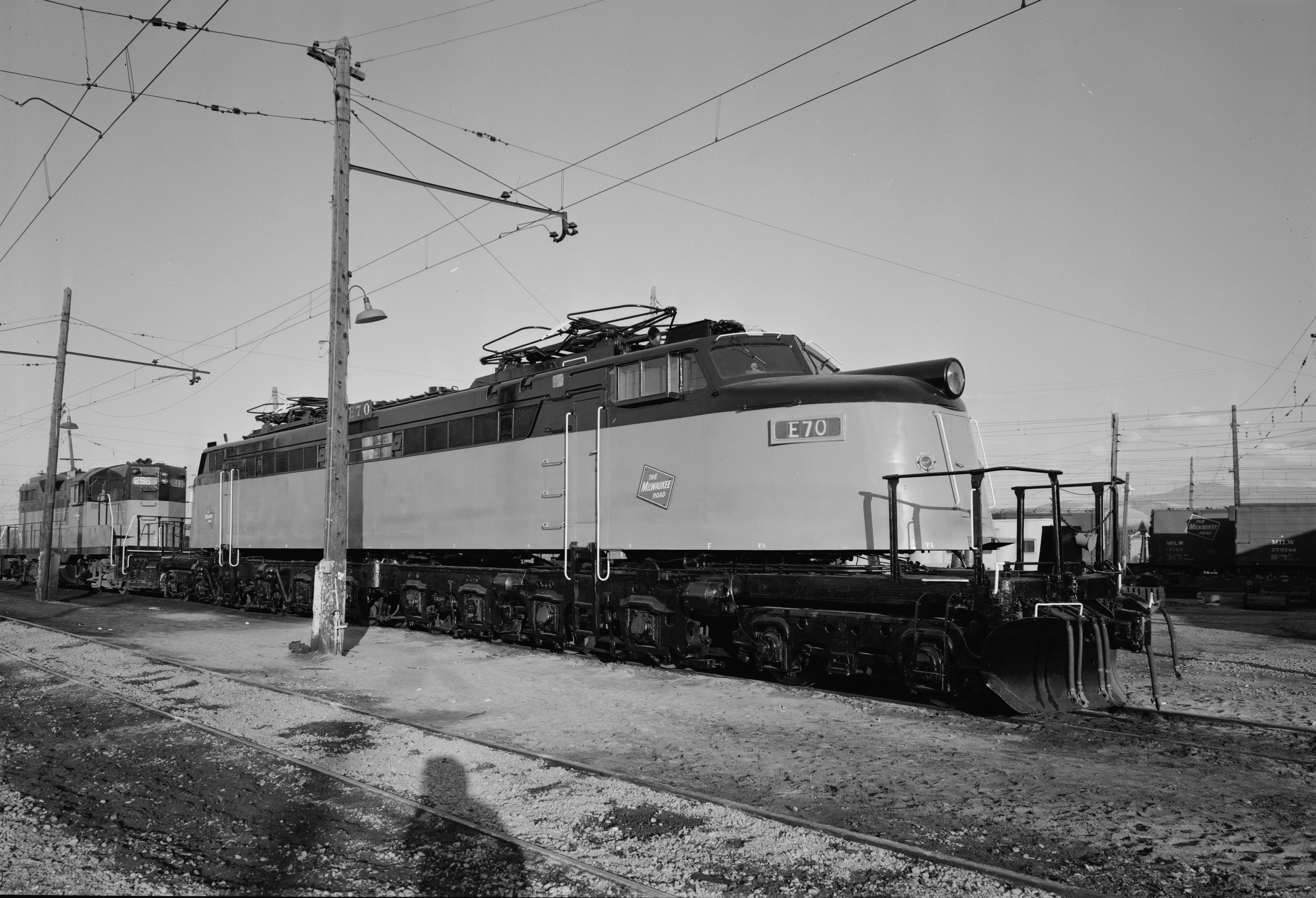
"Little Joe" E-70 idling in Montana in October 1974

The Milwaukee Road had offered to buy all 20 locomotives, plus their spare parts, for $1 million ($13.4 million in 2025 adjusted for inflation). That was little more than scrap value, but GE accepted. However, the Milwaukee's Board of Directors would not release the money. Nonetheless, unit 29927 was tested on 24 December 1948 on the Milwaukee Road, but it revealed some issues during trials.

Demand during the Korean War boosted the Milwaukee's need for locomotives on their electrified mainline. The railroad was also beset by a coal strike that required sending most diesels back East (Milwaukee Lines East steam engines still burned coal, unlike the oil-burning Lines West steamers). The Board of Directors returned to GE, only to discover that eight locomotives and all the spare parts had been sold. Three had gone to the Chicago South Shore & South Bend Railroad (the South Shore Line), and five to the Companhia Paulista de Estradas de Ferro of Brazil.

Still, the Milwaukee Road bought the remaining 12 locomotives for $1 million. The railroad designated its new locomotives as "class EF-4", denoting them as the line's fourth model of electric freight engine. Two units were modified before delivery for passenger service; these were designated "class EP-4". The Milwaukee's operating employees referred to the EF-4/EP-4 units as Little Joseph Stalin's locomotives, which was eventually shortened to simply Little Joe.

==== Performance ====
As originally tested, the Milwaukee was not impressed with these locomotives, finding them prone to wheelslip. The World War I-vintage General Electric motor-generator substations had difficulty supplying more than two EF-4s under heavy load, which meant that their true ability could not be demonstrated. Additionally, the controls were initially labelled in Russian. After being modified with increased weight, raising the maximum height of the pantographs and being provided with adequate power, the EF-4s were excellent performers and very reliable. Some substations were later modified to supply up to 3,400 volts to take advantage of the high power of these locomotives.

==== Modifications ====
The E20 and E21 locomotives became EP-4 engines to be used for passenger service. They were modified before delivery to remove driving controls and windows at one end to permit moving new, improved main circuit breakers into a cooler environment. The Milwaukee Shops replaced the operating controls in the "B" end with a steam generator before they entered service. The loss of this cab was operationally inconsequential, as many Milwaukee electric locomotives were normally turned at the end of their runs in Avery, Deer Lodge or Harlowton, the road having preferred to maintain only one set of controls even on double-ended units. The most important and final major modification was the provision of multiple unit controls for trailing diesel-electric locomotives. This system was designed in-house. It was not uncommon to see several diesel-electric locomotives being led by, and controlled from, one or two Joes (or a set of EF-5 boxcabs) in the 1960s and 1970s.

The external difference that most readily distinguished class EP-4 from EF-4 was the use of roller bearings on all axles on the E20 and E21 as delivered. The EF-4s were delivered with roller bearings on the forward (unpowered) trucks only, though they would have individual roller bearing axles substituted piecemeal in the shop whenever original plain bearing axles on the motorized sets burned out or were wreck-damaged.

Like almost any locomotive class, the Little Joes were occasionally involved in accidents. One such, in 1966, resulted in the E78 being rebuilt (back east in the Milwaukee Shops) to a slightly different appearance from the other 11 units, due to the replacement of the original GE cabs with that of EMD “Bulldog Nose” cabs and the use of a pair of stainless steel side ventilation grilles intended for use on EMD F-units.

==== Usage ====
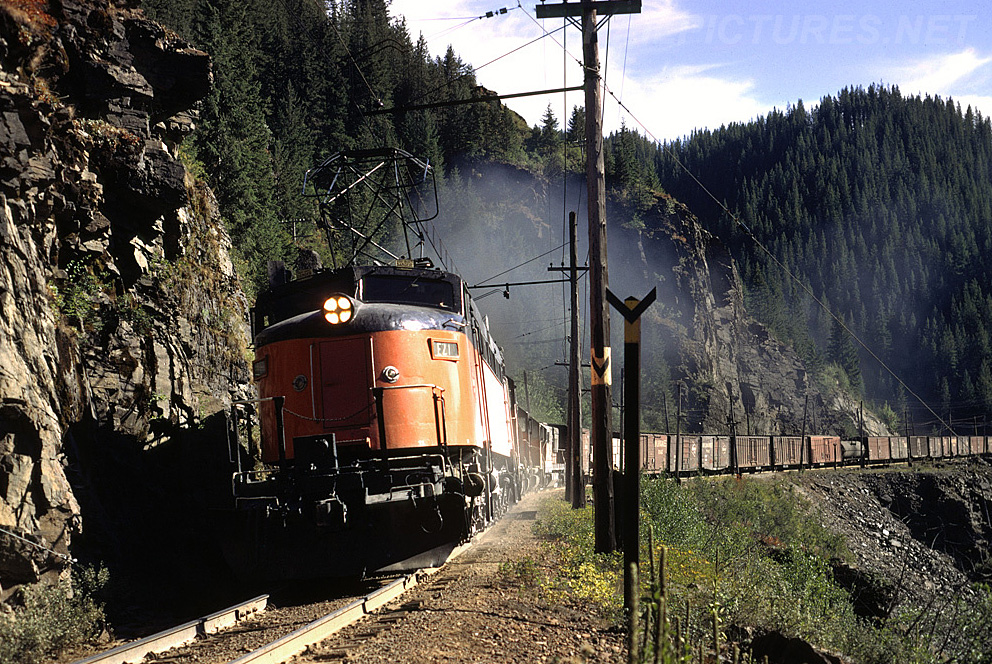
"Little Joe" E-21 leading an eastbound manifest following the St. Joe River out of Avery, Idaho in 1971

The Milwaukee Road used two for passenger service, designated class EP-4 (2-D+D-2), and the remaining 10 for freight, designated class EF-4. They were used on the railroad's electrified Rocky Mountain Division in Montana and Idaho to take the place of older GE boxcab electrics that had been operating there since the 1920s. They were never used on the road's electrically disjunct Coast Division in Washington, as none of that division's substations were upgraded to accommodate them. Three had been delivered in standard gauge, while the rest were converted to standard gauge in the Milwaukee's shops.

The EF-4s performed well, so much so that Milwaukee management soon desired to utilize the two EP-4s exclusively on freights. This was being done by 1956, when the passenger Joes were replaced by newly migrated EP-2 Bipolars. After the latter turned out to be ill-suited to the Rocky Mountain Division, they and the EP-4s were replaced by three-unit consists of EMD E-unit and/or FP7 diesels which hauled the Olympian Hiawatha end-to-end, unassisted, until its discontinuation in 1961. Neither EP-4 received the post-1955 Union Pacific-inspired Armour Yellow, red and gray paint scheme used on Milwaukee passenger power, such as the Bipolars and the EP-1s.

The Little Joes lasted until the end of electric operation on the Milwaukee on June 15, 1974. By that time, they were the Milwaukee's only electric road locomotives, all the GE freight motors (except two which were used together in MU as the Harlowton switcher) having succumbed to old age.

=== South Shore Line ===
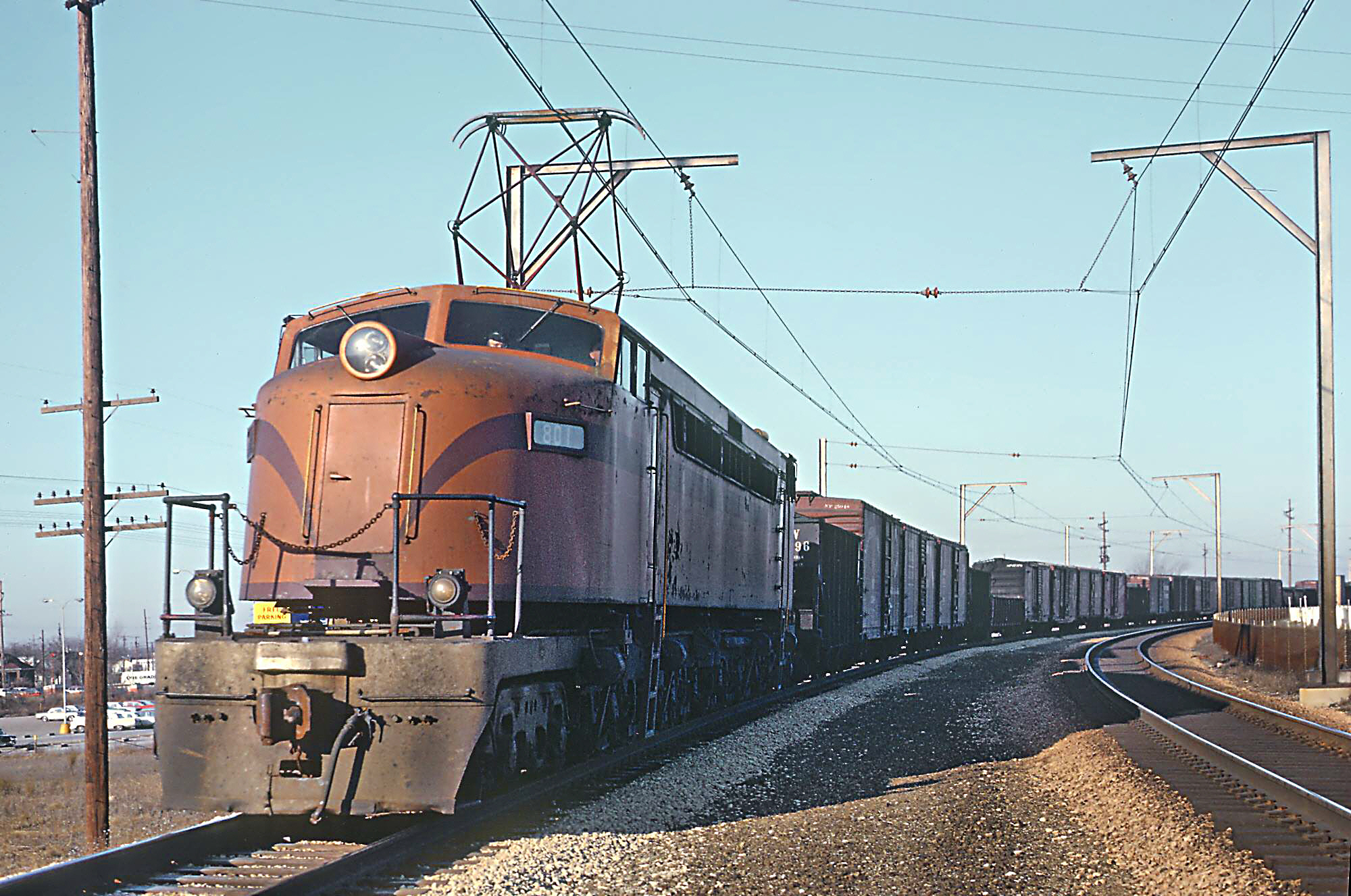
South Shore Line No. 801 outside of East Chicago in 1964

The South Shore Line, while primarily a commuter railroad between Chicago, Illinois, and northwestern Indiana, used them in freight service. They were modified to operate on 1500 V DC catenary and were delivered with roller bearings on all axles as on the Milwaukee EF-4s. In service on the South Shore, the "Little Joe" name was not generally used; they were called "800s". Two of the three lasted until January 1981, making them the last electrics in regular mainline freight service on a US common-carrier railroad. Today, freight trains are commonly pulled by diesel-electric locomotives.

=== Brazil ===
The Companhia Paulista de Estradas de Ferro converted its locomotives to its 5 ft 3 in (1,600 mm) gauge. They became known as Russas, and stayed active through each re-organization of the Brazilian railways, finally ending up with FEPASA in 1971.

These were the most powerful electric locomotives in the country. On this railway, #6454 gained the title "Engenheiro Jayme Cintra" - a tribute for an important person of the Paulista Railway history: he was the responsible for electrification of the main Brazilian railway of that season.

They continued to operate until 1999, becoming the last units of their class in revenue service. It was at this point that FEPASA was privatized, and electric operation was ended.

== Original buyers ==
Owner	Quantity
Milwaukee Road	12
Chicago South Shore & South Bend Railroad	3
Companhia Paulista de Estradas de Ferro	5
Total	20

== Survivors ==
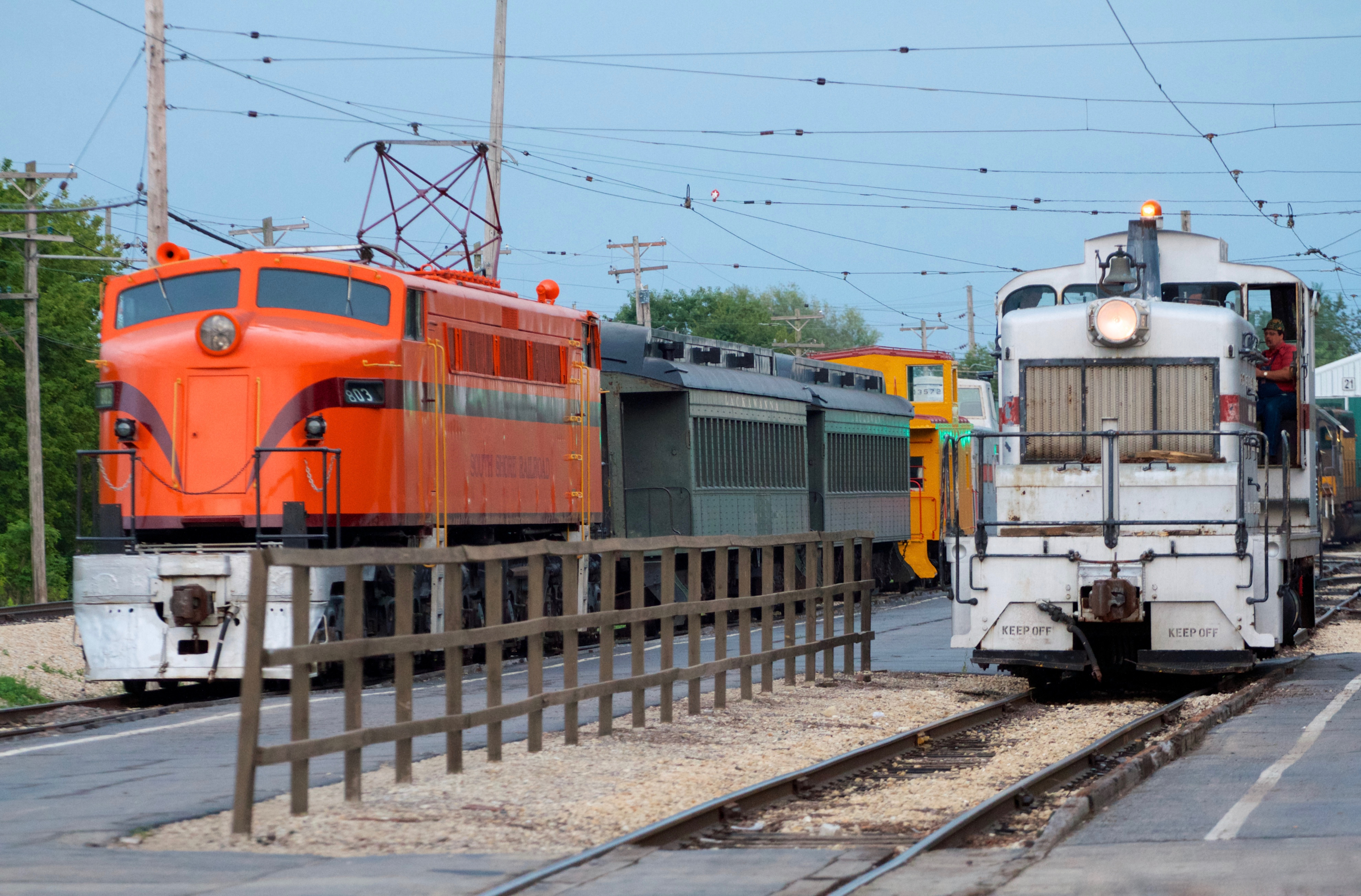
South Shore #803 operating at the Illinois Railway Museum in 2013

=== Milwaukee Road ===
After the June 1974 shutdown, the "Little Joes" remained in storage on the Milwaukee Road system until all were eventually scrapped. Only one unit, E-70, was donated to Deer Lodge and is now displayed on the courthouse lawn painted in the Milwaukee's Olympian Hiawatha livery.

=== South Shore ===
Two units from the South Shore survived the scrapper's torch. #803 is preserved and is in operational condition, at the Illinois Railway Museum (IRM). #802 is preserved and is on public display at the Lake Shore Railway Historical Museum in North East, Pennsylvania, 10 miles (16 km) away from Erie, where the GE's main manufacturing facility that constructed the "Little Joes" is located.

=== Brazil ===
In Brazil, #6451, #6453, and #6454 were scrapped after the FEPASA deactivation in 1999. #6452 is on display in a museum in Jundiaí, São Paulo. #6455 is also preserved in Bauru in the same city but missing many parts. In 2008, the locomotive was transferred to a safe for the stop-station gare and is now located in a rail station-museum.
