= Overland =

Overland or Øverland or variants may refer to:

== Places ==
- Overland, Missouri, a city in the United States
- Overland Park, Kansas, a city in the United States
- Overland Corner, South Australia, a settlement in Australia
- Overland Lake (Nevada), a glacial lake in the United States
- Øverland, Bærum, an area in Norway

== People ==
- Øverland (surname), a Norwegian surname
- Amanda Overland (born 1981), Canadian short track speed skater
- Kevin Overland (born 1974), Canadian speedskater
- Simon Overland (born 1962), Chief Commissioner of Victoria Police (Australia) since March 2009
- Steve Overland, British singer and musician
- Volkert Overlander (1570–1630), Dutch noble and merchant

== Transport ==
- Overland Trail, stagecoach line
- Overland train, oversized off-road vehicle
- Overland Track, Australian hiking trail
- The overland

=== Companies ===
- Overland Automobile, the original name of the American company Willys-Overland
- Overland Custom Coach, Canadian custom vehicle manufacturer
- Overland Airways, Nigerian airline

=== Trains ===
- The Overland Limited, a named train that traversed the United States along the original route of the first transcontinental railroad
- The Overland, the name used since 1926 for the inter-capital passenger train service that runs between Melbourne and Adelaide in Australia
- The Overlander, a former train service that ran between Auckland and Wellington, New Zealand
- The Overland Flyer, one of the named passenger trains of the Union Pacific Railroad

== Events ==
- Overland Campaign, U.S. Civil War campaign
- Overland (Italian expedition), a series of expeditions and documentaries
- Overland Relief Expedition, whaler rescue operation
- The Oxford and Cambridge Far Eastern Expedition, a 1955-6 journey undertaken in two Land Rovers from London to Singapore

== Entertainment ==
- Land and Overland fictional universe
- Overland (magazine), an Australian literary and cultural magazine
- Overland Monthly, a defunct U.S. magazine
- Overland with Kit Carson, a Western film serial from the United States
- Overland (video game), a strategy video game

== Other ==
- Overland Storage, a robotic tape library manufacturer, formerly known as Overland Data
- Overland Telegraph Company, U.S. telegraph company
- Overland High School in Aurora, Colorado
- Overland, American clothing brand

== See also ==
- Overland Expedition (disambiguation)
- Overland Limited (disambiguation)
- Overland Route (disambiguation)
- Overlander (disambiguation)
- Overlanding, self-reliant travelling or done by land to remote destinations
- Oberland (disambiguation)
- Oberlander
- Oorlams
