= Overland Route =

An Overland route or Overland trail may refer to:

== Transportation routes ==
- Overland Route (Australia), a shipping route via the Suez Canal
- Overland Route (Union Pacific Railroad), a passenger rail line from Chicago to Oakland, California
- Overland Trail, a stagecoach and wagon trail in Colorado and Wyoming
- Overland Trail (Yukon), a Klondike Gold Rush-era road in the Yukon
- Butterfield Overland Mail, a stagecoach line between Tennessee or Missouri and California
- Central Overland Route a stagecoach line through Utah and Nevada
- The connection from Suez to Cairo, superseded by the Suez Canal

== Other ==
- Overland Trail (TV series), a 1960s TV series about a fictional character on the Overland stage line

== See also ==
- Overland (disambiguation)
- Overland Track, a walking track in Tasmania, Australia
