= Overland Limited =

Overland Limited may refer to:

== Trains ==
- Overland Limited (ATSF train), 1901–1915
- Overland Limited (UP train), 1895–1931

== Films ==
- The Overland Limited (1925)
- Several short films made in 1899 and 1901:
  - Overland Limited (1899)
  - The 'Overland Limited' Passing Witch Rocks (1899)
  - A Race with the Overland Limited (1901)
  - The Overland Limited (1901)

== See also ==
- Overland (disambiguation)
