= Oberland =

Oberland is a German term and means Highlands.

Consequently, it may refer to several places:

== Germany ==
- Oberland am Rennsteig, Sonneberg, Thuringia, Germany
- Vogtländisches Oberland, Greiz, Thuringia, Germany
- In East Prussia, the Elbląg Canal was named the Oberländischer Kanal (Oberland Canal)
- Bavarian Oberland, the Oberland region in Bavaria

== Switzerland ==
- Berner Oberland, canton of Bern, Switzerland
- Zürcher Oberland, canton of Zürich, Switzerland
- Canton of Oberland, a canton of the former Helvetic Republic (1798–1803)
- Zürcher Oberländer, a Swiss newspaper established in 1870
- Dampfbahn-Verein Zürcher Oberland, a heritage railway association in Zurich

== Austria ==
- Highland (National Council electoral district), electoral district for the National Council
- Tyrolean Oberland, fourth region of Tyrol

== Hungary ==
- Oberlander Jews, who originate from the Oberland region of Hungary
- Upper Hungary, Hungarian term for historical northern Hungary, now mostly Slovakia

== Liechtenstein ==
- Oberland (electoral district), meaning "upper land," is one of the two electoral districts of Liechtenstein

== See also ==
- Oberlander (disambiguation)
- Overlanders (disambiguation)
- Overland (disambiguation)
- Bündner Oberland
- Medels im Oberland
- Oberland League
- Pircher Oberland, Italian company in sustainable timber construction, DIY and garden furnishings
