= Overland Expedition =

Overland Expedition may refer to:

- Overland Relief Expedition, an 1897-1898 expedition by the United States Revenue Cutter Service to rescue whalers trapped in the Arctic Ocean
- Oxford and Cambridge Far Eastern Expedition or First Overland, a 1955-1956 journey by six university students from London to Singapore
- Overland (Italian expedition), a series of expeditions and documentaries
- Overlanding

== See also ==
- Overland Campaign, U.S. Civil War campaign
- Overland (disambiguation)
