= Pavel Baev =

Norwegian political scientist and security scholar

- Павел Баев
- Born: 22 May 1957 (age 68); Vladivostok, RSFSR, USSR
- Occupations: political scientist and security scholar

Pavel Kimovich Baev (Russian: Павел Кимович Баев; born 22 May 1957) is a Russian-Norwegian political scientist and security scholar. He is currently a research professor at the Peace Research Institute Oslo (PRIO) and a senior nonresident fellow at the Brookings Institution (Washington, DC).

Baev graduated from Moscow State University (M.A. in economic and political geography, 1979) and worked in a research institute in the USSR Ministry of Defence. He received his PhD in international relations from the Institute for US and Canadian Studies in Moscow in 1988, then worked in the newly created Institute of Europe in Moscow until 1992, when he moved to Oslo, Norway and joined PRIO. In 1994–1996, he held a Democratic Institutions Fellowship from NATO. From 1995 to 2001, Baev was co-editor of the academic journal Security Dialogue, and from 1999 to 2005 he was a member of the PRIO board.

Baev's current research includes the transformation of the Russian military, Russia – European Union relations, Russia's energy policy, Russia's policy in the Arctic, terrorism and conflicts in the Caucasus.

He is a member of the PONARS Eurasia program, currently located at the Institute for European, Russian, and Eurasian Studies at the Elliot School of International Affairs, George Washington University.

Baev is the author of several books and academic articles and he is a regular columnist in the Eurasia Daily Monitor published by the Jamestown Foundation.

== Recent publications ==
- Baev, Pavel K., 2011. Russia: Moscow Does Not Believe in Change, in Kenneth M. Pollack (ed.), The Arab Awakening. Washington, DC: The Brookings Institution.
- Baev, Pavel K., 2011. The Continuing Revolution in Russian Military Affairs, in Maria Lipman and Nikolai Petrov (eds), Russia-2020 Scenarios for the Future. Washington, DC: Carnegie Endowment for International Peace.
- Anker, Morten; Pavel K. Baev, Bjørn Brunstad, Indra Øverland & Stina Torjesen, 2010. The Caspian Sea Region towards 2025. Delft: Eburon.
- Baev, Pavel K., 2010. Russian Military Perestroika. US – Europe Analysis Series Number 45. Washington, DC: The Brookings Institution.
- Baev, Pavel K., 2010. The South Stream versus Nabucco Pipeline Race, International Affairs 68(5): 1075–1090.
- Trenin, Dmitri & Pavel K. Baev, 2010. The Arctic: A View from Moscow. Carnegie Report. Washington, DC: Carnegie Endowment.
- Baev, Pavel K., 2008. Russian Energy Policy and Military Power: Putin’s Quest for Greatness. London: Routledge.
