= Overlanders =

Overlander or Overlanders may refer to:

- An Australian name for a drover who herds large mobs of sheep or cattle over long distances, to a market or rail head, or to open up new grazing territory
- Overlander (train) was a rail service that operated between the cities of Wellington and Auckland, New Zealand
- Overlander, Western Australia, a location in Australia
- Overlanders, Edmonton, a residential neighbourhood in the Hermitage area of northeast Edmonton, Alberta, Canada
- The Overlanders (film), a 1946 movie about Australian drovers herding cattle across the Australian outback during World War II
- The Overlanders (band), the name of a British 1960s music group
- The Overlanders (Australian band), an Australian folk music group in the 1970s
- Overlander Mountain, in Mount Robson Provincial Park, Canada
- Gregor the Overlander, the first book of the Underland Chronicles by Suzanne Collins
- A human-like species in the Archie Comics series Sonic the Hedgehog

== See also ==
- Overland (disambiguation)
- Overlanding
- Oberland (disambiguation)
- Oberlander
- Oorlams
