= Øverland (surname) =

Øverland is a Norwegian surname. As of 2013, 1,543 people in Norway have this surname.

== Notable people ==
- Arnulf Øverland (1889–1968), Norwegian author
- Erling Øverland (born 1952), Norwegian businessperson
- Indra Øverland (born 1973), Norwegian specialist on energy politics
- Jon Terje Øverland (born 1944), Norwegian alpine skier
- Margrete Aamot Øverland (1913–1978), Norwegian resistance member during the Second World War
- Randi Øverland (born 1952), Norwegian politician
