= Overland Route (Union Pacific Railroad) =

Railway section in the central and western United States

Overview
- Status: Active (Freight and passenger service)
- Owner: Union Pacific Railroad (entire modern corridor)
- Locale: Midwestern and Western United States
- Termini: Chicago (historical passenger) / Council Bluffs, Iowa (original UP railhead); Oakland / San Francisco

Service
- Type: Transcontinental rail corridor
- System: Union Pacific Railroad / Southern Pacific / Chicago & North Western
- Operator(s): Union Pacific Railroad; Amtrak (California Zephyr)

History
- Opened: May 10, 1869 (Completion of First Transcontinental Railroad)

Technical
- Line length: 2,260 mi (3,640 km)
- Number of tracks: Double-track (mostly)
- Track gauge: 1,435 mm (4 ft 8 1/2 in)
- Highest elevation: 8,247 ft (2,514 m) at Sherman Summit

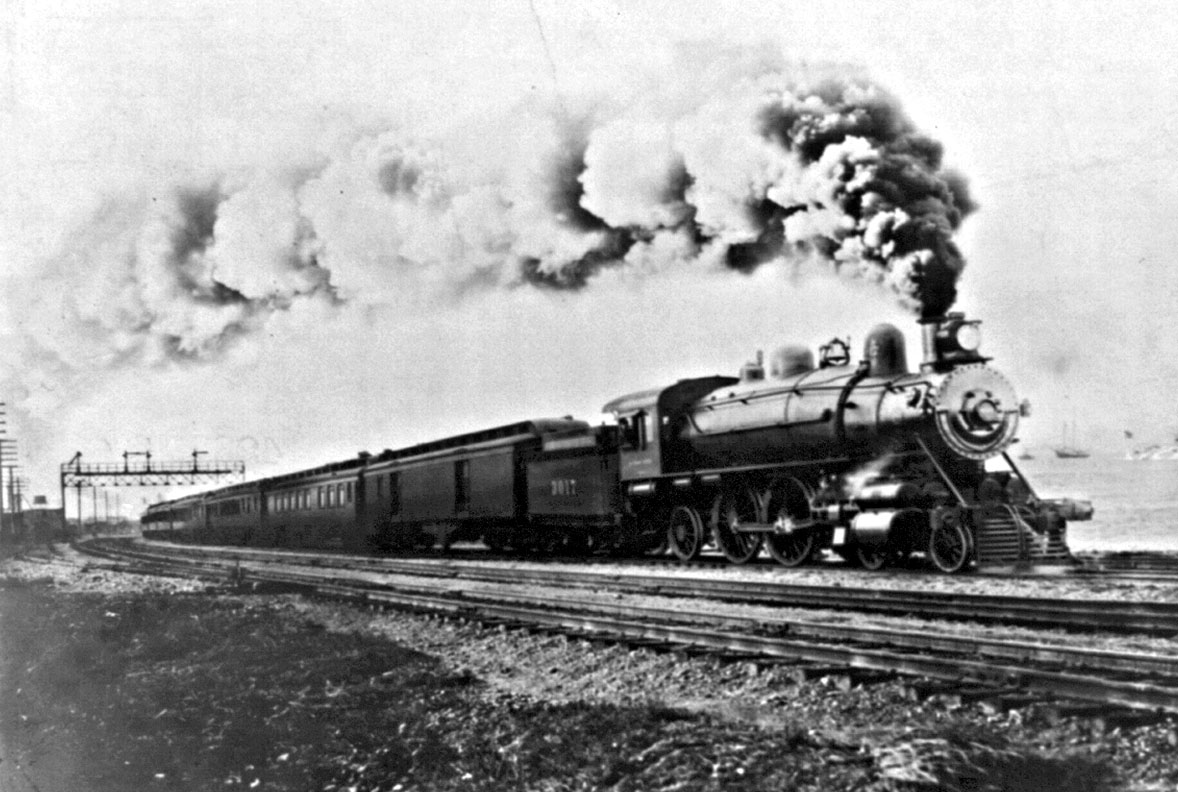
The Overland Limited leaving 16th Street station (Oakland), in 1906

The Overland Route was a train route operated jointly by the Union Pacific Railroad and the Central Pacific Railroad/Southern Pacific Railroad, between the eastern termini of Council Bluffs, Iowa, and Omaha, Nebraska, and the San Francisco Bay Area, over the grade of the first transcontinental railroad (also called the "Pacific Railroad") which opened on May 10, 1869. Passenger trains that operated over the line included the Overland Flyer, later renamed the Overland Limited, with its eastern terminal in Chicago.

The Overland Route remains a common name for the line from northern California to Chicago, now owned entirely by the Union Pacific. The route is now primarily used for freight, with a few portions used by Amtrak's California Zephyr passenger train.

== History ==
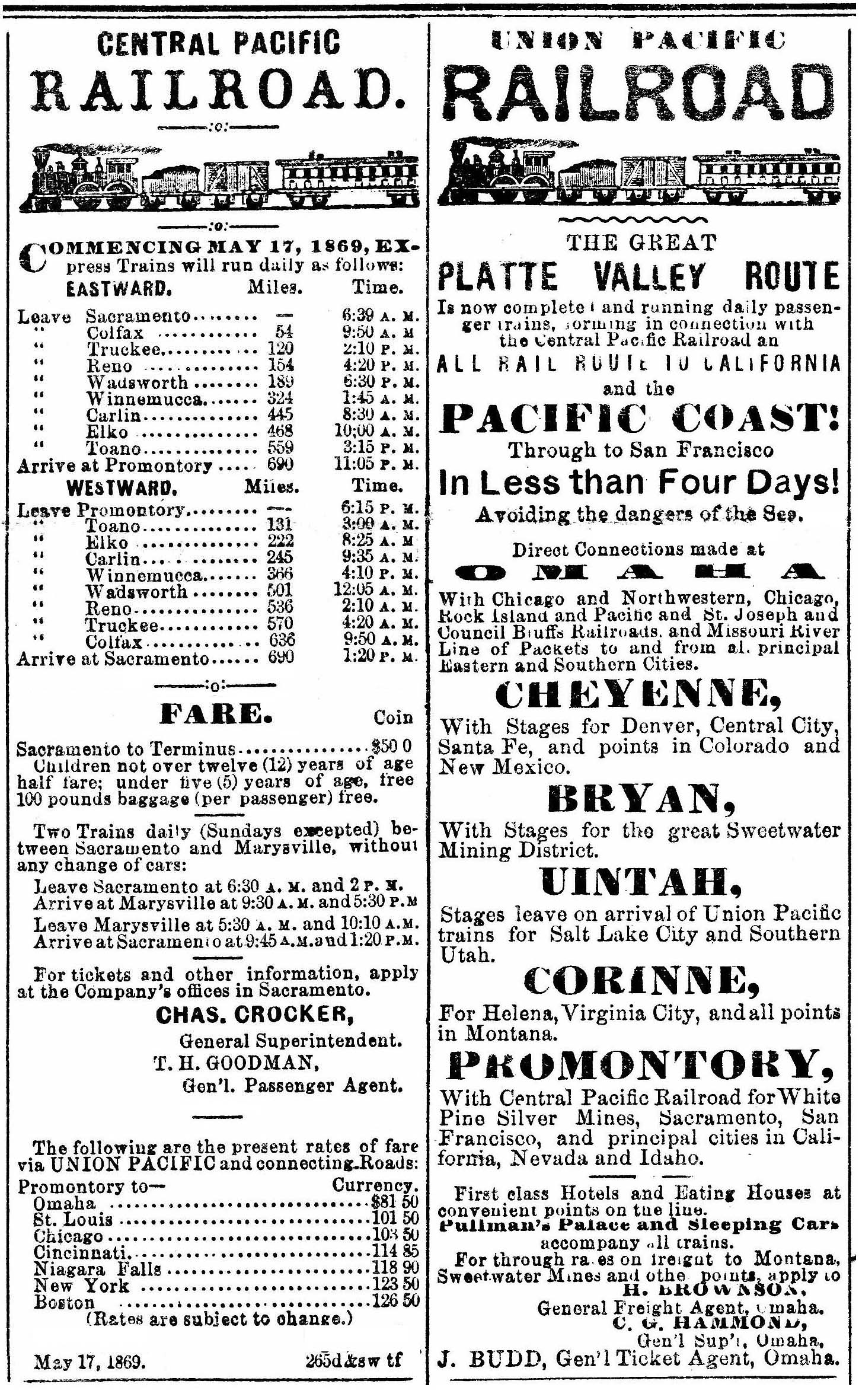
Display ads for the CPRR and UPRR the week the rails were joined on May 10, 1869

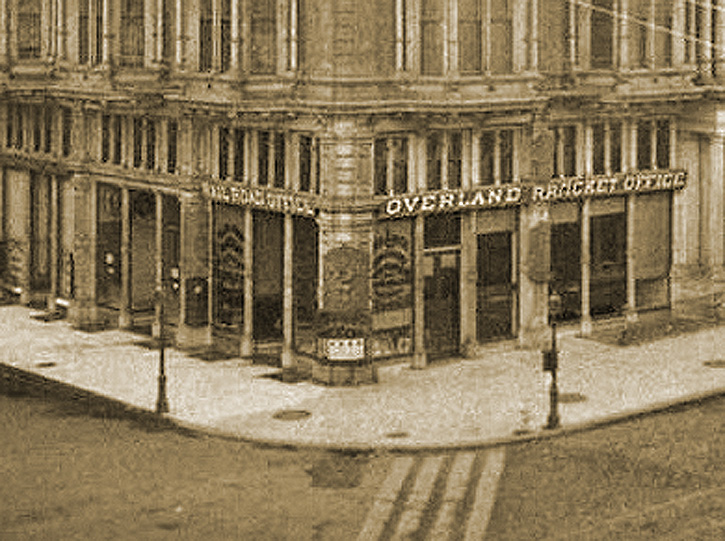
The Overland's SF ticket office at the Palace Hotel

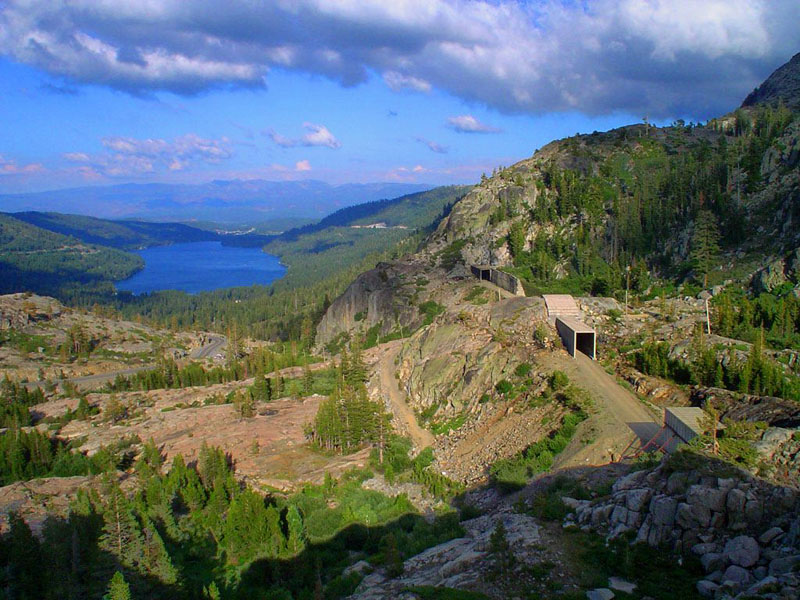
Donner Lake (left) and the now abandoned original CPRR (later SPRR) Track #1 grade over Donner Pass

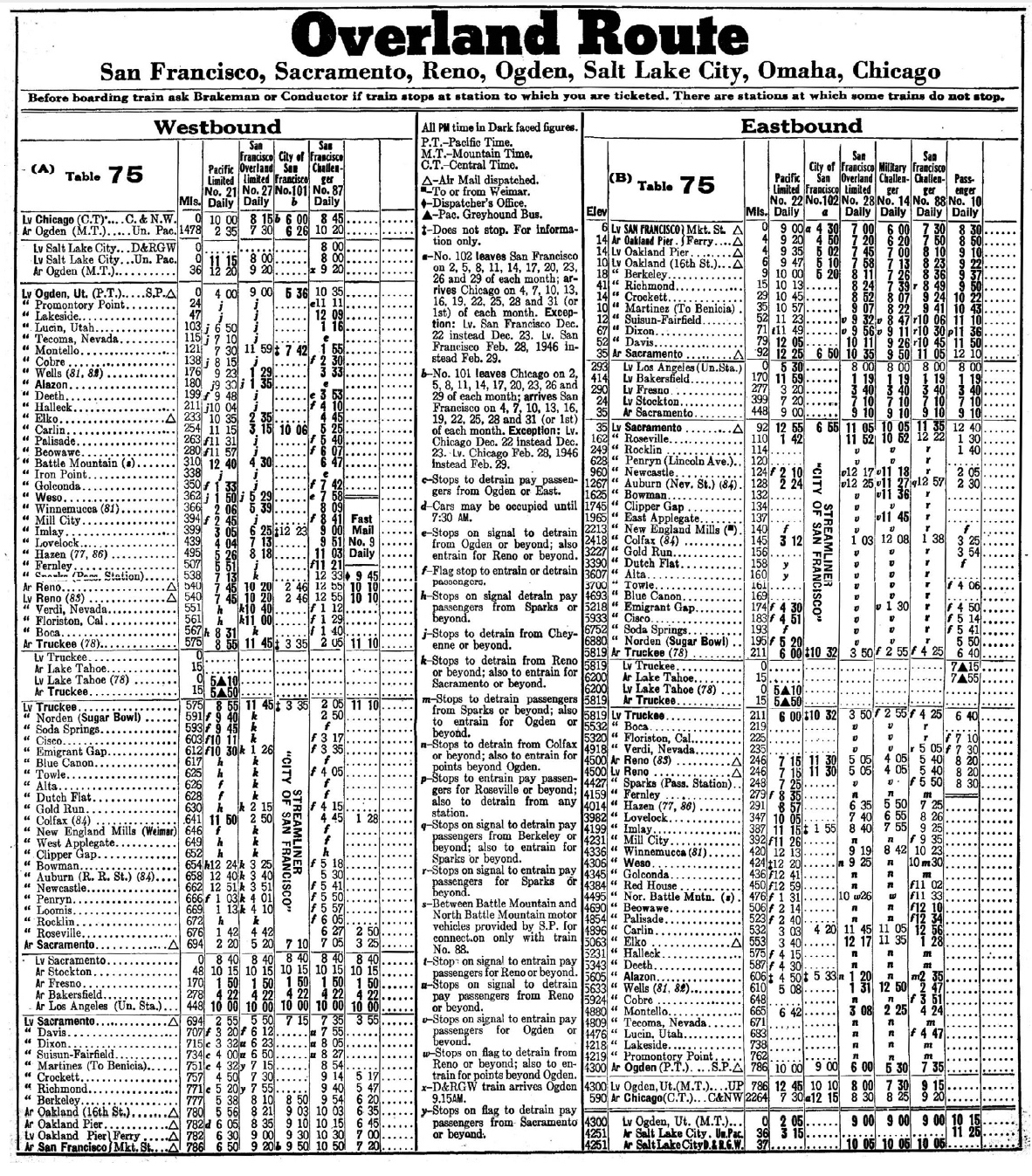
Overland Route schedule, December 1945

The name harkens back to the Central Overland Route, a stagecoach line operated by the Overland Mail Company between Salt Lake City, Utah, and Virginia City, Nevada, from 1861 to 1866, when Wells Fargo & Company took over the stagecoach's operation. Wells Fargo ended this stagecoach service three years later.

While the Council Bluffs/Omaha to San Francisco "Pacific Railroad" grade was opened in 1869, the name “Overland” was not formally adopted for any daily extra-fare train over the route until almost two decades later. On November 13, 1887, the Union Pacific inaugurated service of its Overland Flyer between Omaha and Ogden, Utah, where passengers and through cars were transferred to the Southern Pacific, which had acquired the CPRR's operations on that line in 1885 under a 99-year lease. The UP changed its designation to the Overland Limited on November 17, 1895, and service continued as a daily train under that name in one form or another for almost seven decades. For the first dozen years that the SP met the UP's Overland trains, however, it dubbed its service the "Ogden Gateway Route"; its connecting westbound trains operated as the Pacific Express and eastbound trains as the Atlantic Express. The SP finally adopted the name the Overland Limited in 1899 for its portion of the run as well.

The original 1,911 miles (3,075 km) of the route from Omaha to San Francisco traversed some of the most desolate (as well some of the most picturesque) lands of the western two-thirds of the North American continent. While the trip originally took low-fare emigrant trains a full week (or more) to complete, by 1906 the electric lighted all-Pullman Overland Limited covered the route in just 56 hours.

E. H. Harriman bought the bankrupt Union Pacific in 1897; in 1901, he assumed control of the Central Pacific and Southern Pacific as well. The rebuilding of the Overland Route followed: hundreds of miles of double track, hundreds of miles of signals, and dozens of realignments to reduce grades, curvature, and perhaps distance. (The rebuilding actually started before the CP/SP acquisition—the map in the May 1969 issue of Trains shows the Howell-to-Bossler stretch realigned in 1899.)

By 1926, the UP route from Council Bluffs/Omaha to Ogden was continuous double track, except for the Aspen Tunnel (east of Evanston, Wyoming), which remained a bottleneck until 1949. The CP/SP portion of the route was also largely double-tracked during this period, with the completion of such projects as the 1909 Hood Realignment between Rocklin and Newcastle, double-tunneling along the Sierra Grade including at Cisco and the summit (Tunnel #41), and the 1924 agreement to share tracks across Nevada with the Western Pacific Railroad's Feather River Route.

Among the most important improvements to the original grade was the Lucin Cutoff, a new 102.9-mile (165.6 km) stretch from just west of Ogden to Lucin, a few miles east of the Nevada border. It included a 12-mile (19 km) trestle on wooden pilings across the Great Salt Lake. Opened in 1904, this line cut 43.8 miles (70.5 km) off the line, eliminated 3,919 degrees of curvature, and removed 1,515 feet (462 m) of climb from the route, thus decreasing the steepest SP grade east of Lucin from 90 feet per mile to 21.

But many other sections of the original 1860s grade were harder to improve on, notably over the Sierra Nevada between Colfax, California, and Reno, Nevada. The newer second track follows a better route here and there, but the original route changed little (except for the removal of the wooden snowsheds, or their replacement by nonflammable concrete ones) until the 1993 abandonment of the 6.7-mile section of the Track No. 1 crossing of the summit between Norden and Eder which includes the original 1,659-foot-long (506 m) Summit Tunnel (No. 6). Traffic was sent instead over the easier-to-maintain Track No. 2 and through the 10,322-foot-long (3,146 m) tunnel called “The Big Hole” (No. 41) which had been driven under Mt. Judah a mile south of the Pass when that portion of the line was double tracked in 1925. Aside from those modifications, the Sierra grade looks much the same to train passengers as it did when the line opened in 1868.

=== Connection to Chicago ===
From the start-up of the Overland Flyer in 1887 the Chicago and North Western Railway handled Overland Route trains between Chicago and Omaha. On October 30, 1955, passenger operations east of Omaha shifted to the Chicago, Milwaukee, St. Paul and Pacific Railroad (the "Milwaukee Road").

=== Demise ===
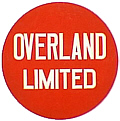
"Drumhead" logos such as this often adorned the ends of the observation cars on the Overland Limited.

As intercity passenger rail travel began to decline after World War II and into the 1950s with the growth of the airline industry and development of the Interstate Highway System, the Overland route gradually lost its luster and service declined. After almost seven decades of continuous operation, the Overland Limited came to an end as a daily train on July 16, 1962, when the Interstate Commerce Commission approved termination of the service. While the train continued to run until Labor Day (with some additional holiday runs from Christmas to the New Year), the name “Overland” did not appear in the schedules of the UP or SP again after its last run on January 2, 1963. The only daily passenger train between Omaha and the San Francisco Bay area today is the California Zephyr, operated by Amtrak and mostly along a different, more scenic route. The Zephyr only uses the Overland Route in the states of California and Nevada, passing through Salt Lake City instead of Ogden and traveling via the Central Corridor to Denver instead of Cheyenne. In 1996, the Union Pacific again acquired the Southern Pacific, resulting in the entire Chicago-Oakland line being owned by a single company.

== Route description ==
=== Council Bluffs/Omaha to Ogden (via the Union Pacific) ===
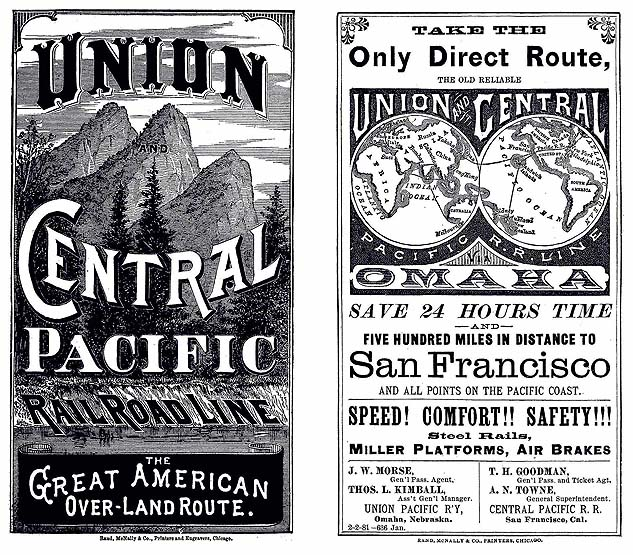
UPRR & CPRR "Great American Over-Land Route" Timetable cover 1881

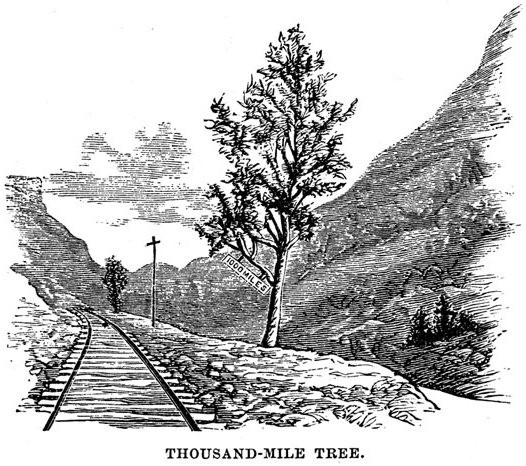
The "Thousand Mile Tree" located 1,000 miles (1,600 km) west of Omaha, Nebraska, on the UPRR grade of the Overland Route

Heading west from Council Bluffs/Omaha over the same wide-open plains of Nebraska's Platte River Valley that had been followed by so many wagon trains from the 1840s through the 1860s, Overland trains passed first through Fremont, Grand Island, and Kearney (196 miles from Omaha) where all the wagon trails from the Missouri River communities between Omaha and Kansas City had once converged. There the famous Fort Kearney had been built by the U.S. Army in 1858 to protect the Oregon–California Trail heading west, and from which, under the direction of Union Generals U.S. Grant and W.T. Sherman, soldiers had been dispatched to protect UP surveyors and construction crews from Indian attack as the road progressed across Nebraska towards Wyoming.

By the time travelers on the Overland Route crossed into Wyoming at Pine Bluffs, they had traveled some 470 miles (760 km) westward and risen in elevation above sea level from the 1,033 feet (315 m) at Omaha to 5,047 feet (1,538 m). The Rocky Mountains first came into passengers’ view 20 miles (32 km) further on at Hillsdale with the appearance of the dark crests of the Laramie Range. About 36 miles (58 km) further west the route reached Sherman, the highest point on the line at 8,013 feet (2,442 m), on a high and rugged upland with bold rock masses eroded into fantastic, picturesque shapes. The Ames Monument was constructed in 1882 to mark this highest point.

After passing through the towns of Laramie and Rawlins, the rough route crossed the Continental Divide at Creston, some 737 miles (1,186 km) west of Omaha. At Green River passengers were treated to views of two of the most spectacular rock formations in Wyoming—Man's Face directly southwest of the station, and Castle Rock just north of it. Six miles after crossing the Bear River at Evanston the route entered Utah, a land which would provide passengers with close-up views of some of the most unusual rock formations of the entire trip.

After passing Henefer where Brigham Young and his Mormon pioneers had turned southward in 1847 to cross the Wasatch Mountains into Emigration Cañon, perhaps the two most famous features on the Union Pacific's section of the Overland, Thousand Mile Tree and Devil's Slide, came into view on the west, and south sides of the track, respectively. Entering the Valley of the Great Salt Lake, the route soon reached Ogden, some 1,029 miles (1,656 km) from Omaha. Here the Union Pacific lines diverged to Los Angeles and the Pacific Northwest while the Southern Pacific (which acquired operational control of the CPRR's original Pacific route under lease in 1885) took charge of the “Overland Limited” and other trains on to San Francisco.

=== Ogden to San Francisco (via the Central Pacific/Southern Pacific) ===
When the route opened in 1869, trains reached the San Francisco Bay.

For the 35 years after the driving of the “Last Spike” at Promontory Summit in 1869, all trains traveling west of Ogden passed over the site of that seminal event as they made their way around the northern end of the Great Salt Lake. In November 1903, the SP opened the Lucin Cutoff, a 102.9-mile (165.6 km) stretch of track featuring a 12-mile (19 km) trestle built on pilings across the Great Salt Lake. Ten miles past Lucin, the “Overland” crossed into Nevada at Tecoma, the nearest railroad town to the silver, copper, and lead deposits discovered in the region in 1874.

Passing through other western Nevada mining centers and through Wells, an important supply point on the old Emigrant Trail, the line then followed the valley of the 300-mile (480 km) long Humboldt River. Devil's Peak, a perpendicular rock rising 500 feet (150 m) from the edge of the Humboldt River, dominated the canyon scenery at Palisade while the last major stop in Nevada was Reno with the Sierra Nevada mountains dominating the view ahead.

After passing Verdi, Nevada, the Overland Route crossed into California and followed the Truckee River up a picturesque canyon to the town of Truckee on Donner Lake where the ill-fated George Donner party had been snowbound in the winter of 1846–7.

A serpentine climb around the east end of the lake and up Mt. Judah brought the Overland to the 1,659-foot-long (506 m) Summit Tunnel at 7,018 feet at Donner Pass and the start of a 105-mile (169 km) descent to Sacramento located just 35 feet (11 m) above sea level. Travel over this section could be quite treacherous in the winter as the Southern Pacific had to clear as much as 50 to 60 feet (15 to 18 m) of snowfall as well as ice from water dripping in the tunnels. The miles of showsheds needed to keep the line passable left the impression among passengers that they were “railroading in a tunnel” for much of the route. The wooden snowsheds sometimes caught fire from lightning strikes or embers from steam locomotives.

Still there were some extensive views available to passengers in the Sierras, the most famous of which was that from “Cape Horn” just above the town of Colfax where the grade was carved out of the side of a mountain, providing a panoramic view across Green Valley of the American River flowing in a canyon some 1,322 feet (403 m) below. This spot was so popular that for many years the Southern Pacific stopped the Overland and most other trains for a few minutes so that passengers could get off the train and take it all in from a special observation area.

When the route opened in 1869, trains reached the San Francisco Bay area from Sacramento via a 140-mile (230 km) line (built by the original Western Pacific Railroad) by way of Stockton over Altamont Pass, and on through Niles Canyon first to a pier at Alameda, and shortly thereafter to the nearby two-mile long Oakland Long Wharf (later called the "SP Mole") from which San Francisco was then accessed by ferry. In 1876, however, the CPRR acquired a line built by the California Pacific Railroad from Sacramento to Vallejo and in 1879 completed an extension of that road 17 miles (27 km) across the Suisun Marsh to Benicia. There the CPRR established a ferry service to carry its trains a little more than a mile across the Carquinez Strait to Port Costa from which they ran down the southern shoreline of the Strait and San Pablo Bay, and then along eastern side of the San Francisco Bay to the Oakland Long Wharf, thereby cutting about 50 miles (80 km) off the journey from Sacramento. After half a century of operation, the train ferry was replaced in October 1930 by a massive drawbridge built by the SP between Benicia and Martinez. It is still in use today.

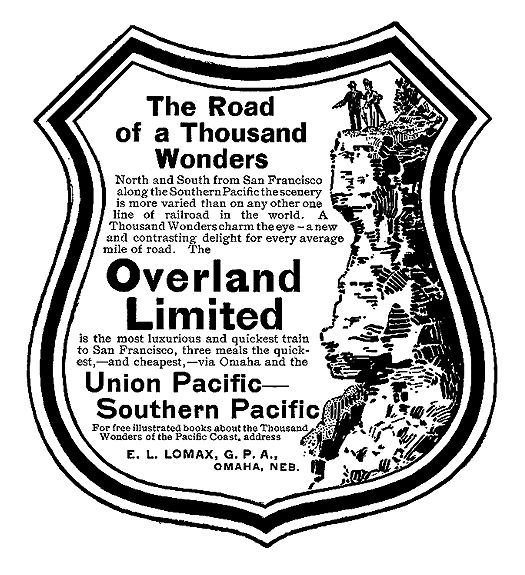
Magazine display advertisement for the "Overland Limited" c. 1905

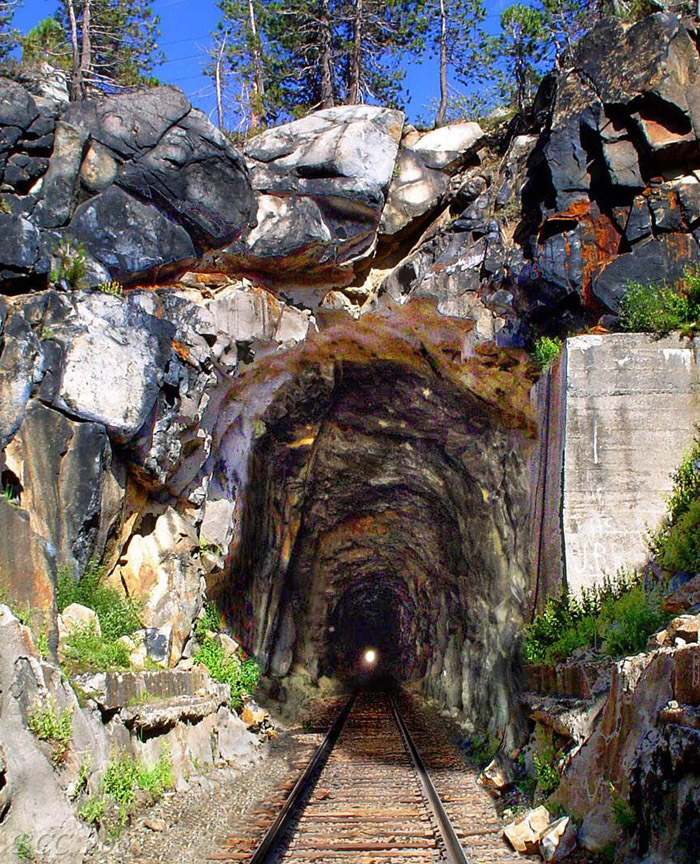
The West portal of the "Summit Tunnel" (#6) at Donner Pass

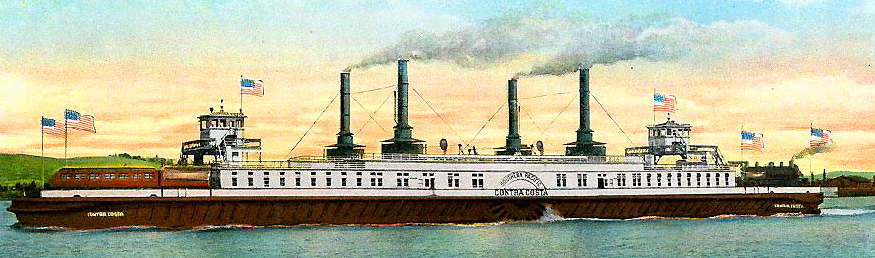
SP train ferry Contra Costa

=== Subdivisions ===
The modern incarnation of the Union Pacific Railroad has divided the Overland Route into the following subdivisions:

- Geneva Subdivision: Chicago, Illinois, to Clinton, Iowa
- Clinton Subdivision: Clinton to Boone
- Boone Subdivision: Boone to Missouri Valley, Iowa
- Blair Subdivision: Missouri Valley to Fremont, Nebraska (this subdivision bypasses Omaha, Nebraska)
- Omaha Subdivision: Missouri Valley to Fremont (via Omaha)
- Columbus Subdivision: Fremont to Grand Island
- Kearney Subdivision: Grand Island to North Platte
- Sidney Subdivision: North Platte to Cheyenne, Wyoming
- Laramie Subdivision: Cheyenne to Rawlins
- Rawlins Subdivision: Rawlins to Green River
- Evanston Subdivision: Green River to Ogden, Utah
- Lakeside Subdivision: Ogden to Alazon (line switchover near Wells, Nevada)
- Shafter Subdivision: Alazon to Elko
- Elko Subdivision: Elko to Weso (line switch near Winnemucca)
- Nevada Subdivision: Weso to Sparks
- Roseville Subdivision: Sparks to Roseville, California
- Martinez Subdivision: Roseville to Oakland, California
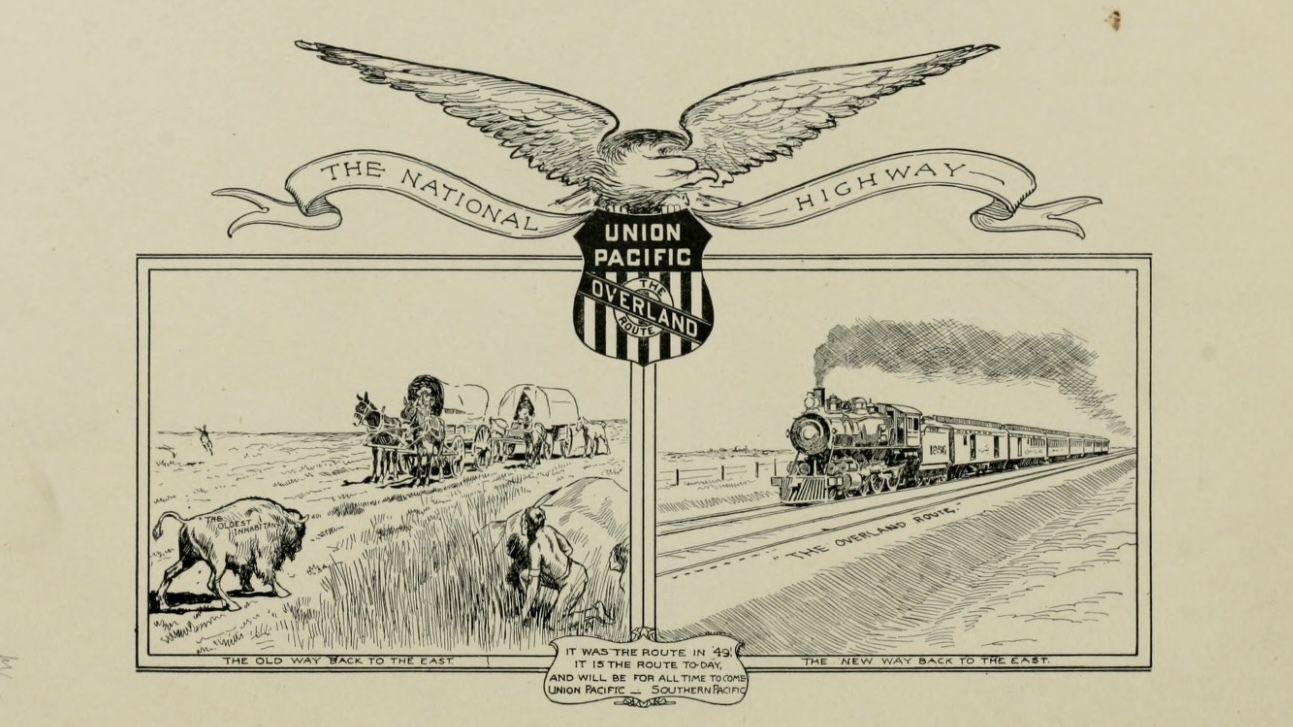
Union Pacific Overland Route promotional image, c. 1900

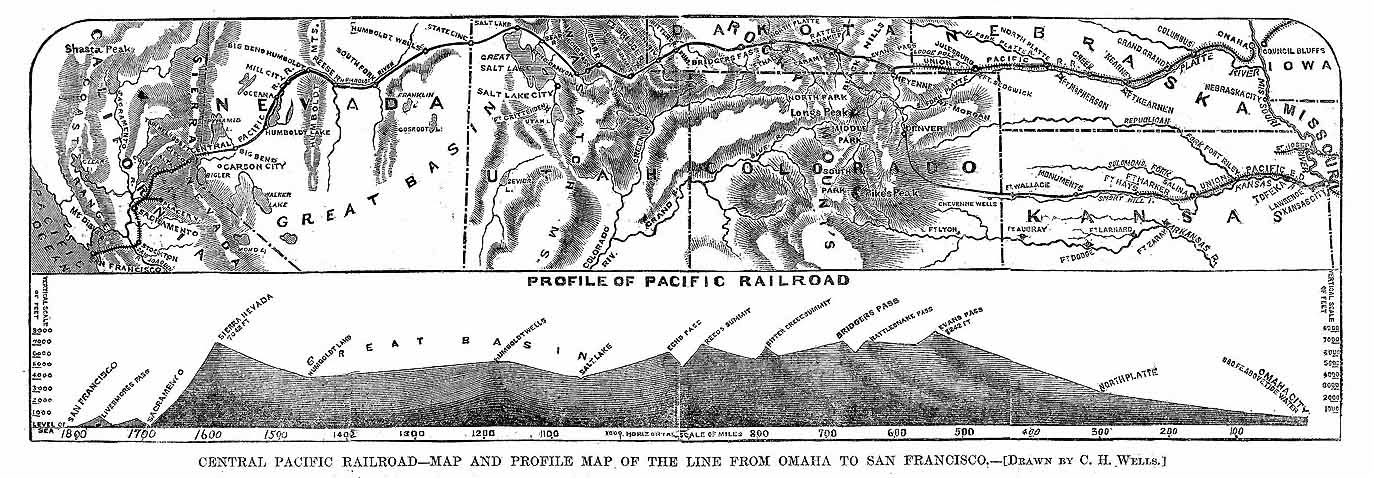
Original profile of the CPRR/UPRR "Over-Land Route" of the Pacific Railroad

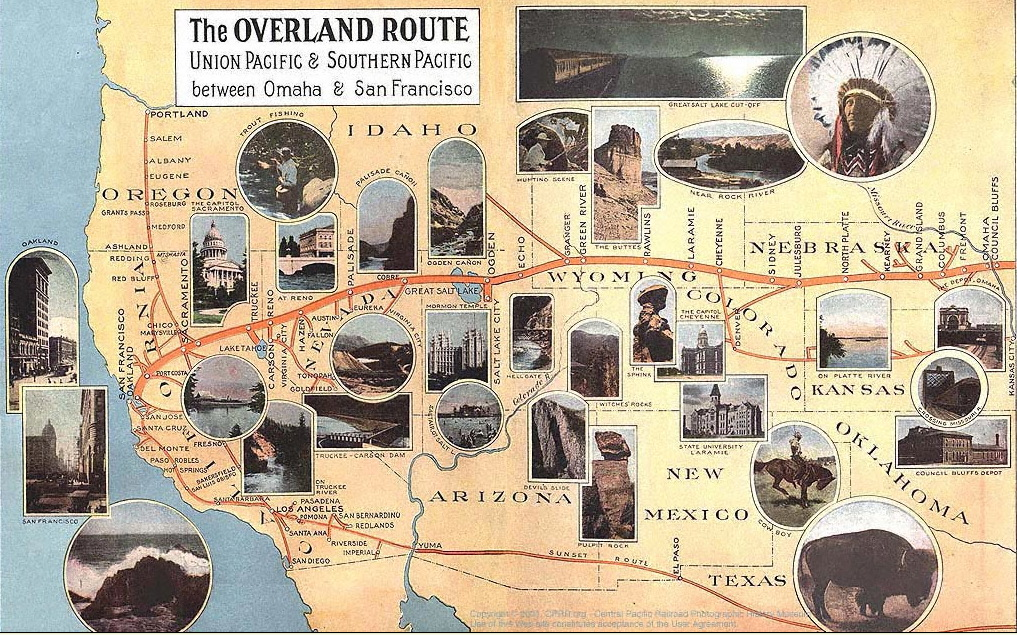
"The Overland Route to the Road of a Thousand Wonders: The Route of the Union Pacific & Southern Pacific from Omaha to San Francisco - A Journey of Eighteen Hundred Miles Where Once the Bison & the Indian Reigned"
Union and Southern Pacific Railroad Passenger Departments, 1908.

== See also ==
- First transcontinental railroad—covers the construction of this rail line
- List of railroad crossings of the North American continental divide
- Overland Limited—a similarly named passenger train, operated by the Atchison, Topeka and Santa Fe Railway

== General and cited references ==
- Beebe, Lucius Morris (1963). The Overland Limited. Howell-North Books. OCLC 756798.
- Scribbins, Jim (1970). The Hiawatha Story. Milwaukee, Wisconsin: Kalmbach Publishing Company. LCCN 70107874. OCLC 91468.
- Solomon, Brian (2000). Union Pacific Railroad. Osceola, Wisconsin: MBI. ISBN 0-7603-0756-3.
