= Oberlander =

Oberlander or Oberländer is a German surname, and may refer to:

== People ==
- Adolf Oberländer (1845–1923), German caricaturist
- Andy Oberlander (1905–1968), American football player
- Carl Ferdinand Oberländer (1805–1866), German ornithologist
- Cornelia Oberlander (1921–2021), Canadian landscape architect
- Donna Oberlander (born 1970), American politician
- Fred Oberlander (1911–1966), Austrian/British/Canadian wrestler
- Helmut Oberlander (1924–2021), Ukrainian Canadian who served as an interpreter in the Einsatzgruppen
- Jonathan Oberlander, professor at the University of North Carolina at Chapel Hill
- Jon Oberlander (1962–2017), British Professor of Epistemics, University of Edinburgh
- Peter Oberlander (1922–2008), Canadian architect
- Philipp Jakob Oberländer (1875–1911), Czech traveller and big game hunter
- Theodor Oberländer (1905–1998), Nazi activist, German politician, military leader, and agricultural scientist

== Other ==
- The South German Coldblood breed of horse (also known as the Oberland breed)
- Oberlander Jews, a group of Jews originating from the Oberland region of Hungary
- Robert Oberlender, a medicinal chemist
- Lu Ann Hampton Laverty Oberlander

== See also ==
- Oberland (disambiguation)
