= Overland Route (Australia) =

Trade route between Australia and East Asia

The Overland Route is a route to Australia and East Asia. The route crosses the European continent. It was inaugurated by Thomas Fletcher Waghorn in 1845, and was modified on the opening of the Suez Canal in 1869. The route now crosses the following locations:

- France
- The Mont Cenis tunnel
- Brindisi
- The Levant
- Suez Canal
- The Red Sea
- The Indian Ocean.
