= Vogtländisches Oberland =

Coordinates: 50°35′30″N 12°5′30″E

Vogtländisches Oberland (German pronunciation: [ˈfoːktlɛndɪʃəs ˈoːbɐlant], lit. 'Vogtlandian Highlands') is a former municipality in the district of Greiz, in Thuringia, Germany. It was disbanded on 31 December 2012. The villages Cossengrün, Hohndorf and Schönbach became part of the town Greiz, the villages Arnsgrün, Bernsgrün and Pöllwitz became part of the town Zeulenroda-Triebes. Its population was 2,851 (2011), and its area was 71.62 km^{2}.
