= Carl Ferdinand Oberländer =

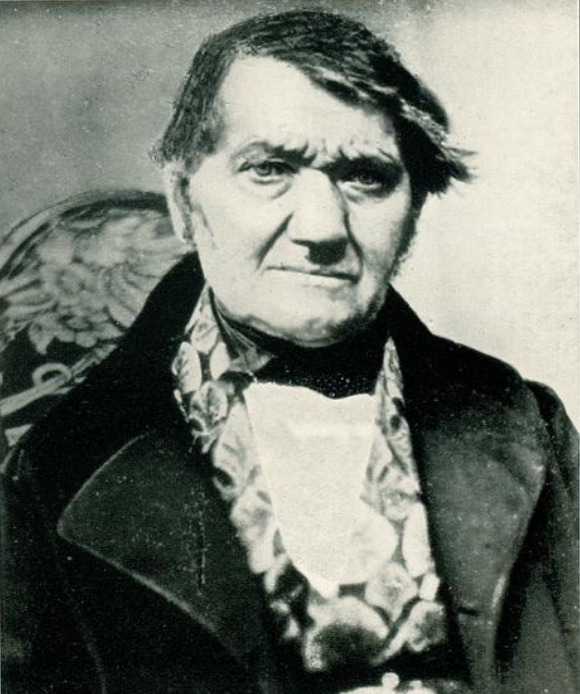

Carl Ferdinand Oberländer (24 January 1805 – 23 June 1866) was a baker and confectioner in Greiz who collected natural history specimens from around the world. His ornithological collections consisting of about 1400 specimens was obtained by the Waldenburg Natural History Museum.

Oberländer was born in Greiz where he became a baker and confectioner. He was a close friend of Karl Theodor Liebe with whom he took an interest in birds. In 1840 he put up his collections for sale in the Leipziger Zeitung, the sale having been done because of some accidental arsenic poisoning from the preserved birds. The collection had 925 specimens representing 250 species from the Palearctic and about 32 exotic species. Its sale was brokered by Professor Johann Heinrich Gottfried Apetz to be obtained by the city of Klagenfurt. An earlier collection was acquired by Prince Otto Viktor I in Waldenburg according to Felix Heller.
