= Overland Limited (UP train) =

American named railroad service

Overland Limited Overland Flyer
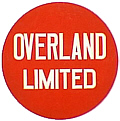

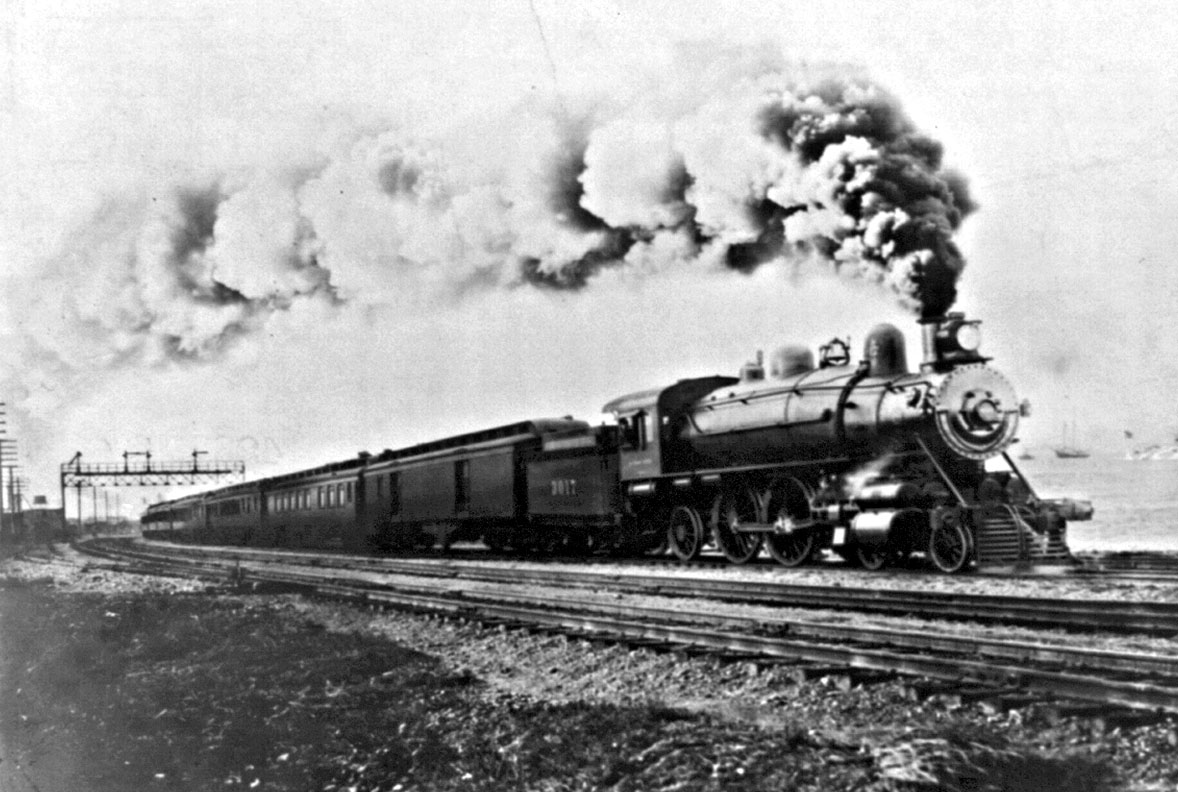
- The Overland Limited leaving 16th Street Station, Oakland, in 1906

Overview
- Service type: Inter-city rail
- Locale: Western United States
- First service: November 13, 1887
- Last service: 1963
- Former operators: Union Pacific Railroad; Southern Pacific Railroad; Milwaukee Road; Chicago and North Western Railway

Route
- Termini: Chicago, Illinois; San Francisco, California
- Stops: 27 (westbound); 28 (eastbound)
- Distance travelled: 2,189 miles (3,523 km) (1954)
- Average journey time: 63 hours
- Service frequency: Daily
- Train numbers: 1 (Chicago - San Francisco); 2 (San Francisco - Chicago)
- Line used: Overland Route

On-board services
- Seating arrangements: Reclining seat coaches
- Sleeping arrangements: Observation sleeping car
- Catering facilities: Dining car
- Observation facilities: Club lounge car
- Other facilities: Club Buffet Car; Valet and maid service; Barber and bath

Technical
- Track gauge: 4 ft 8 1/2 in (1,435 mm)
- Operating speed: 35.8 mph (average)

The Overland Limited (also known at various times as the Overland Flyer, San Francisco Overland Limited, San Francisco Overland and often simply as the Overland) was an American named passenger train which for much of its history was jointly operated by three railroads on the Overland Route between San Francisco and Chicago. The Southern Pacific Railroad handled the train west of Ogden, Utah, the Union Pacific Railroad between Ogden and Omaha, Nebraska/Council Bluffs, Iowa, and east of the Missouri River to Chicago it was operated by the Chicago and North Western Railway as well as, for a few years starting in 1955, by the Chicago, Milwaukee, St. Paul and Pacific Railroad (the "Milwaukee Road").

The named service on this route began on the UP first as the Overland Flyer (1887–96) and then Overland Limited, and the SP began its own separate named Overland Limited train in 1899. The Overland name disappeared on C&NW's portion of the route on October 30, 1955, from the UP in 1956, and finally ended on the SP's portion as a separate year-round train on July 16, 1962 when that service was consolidated with the City of San Francisco.

== History ==
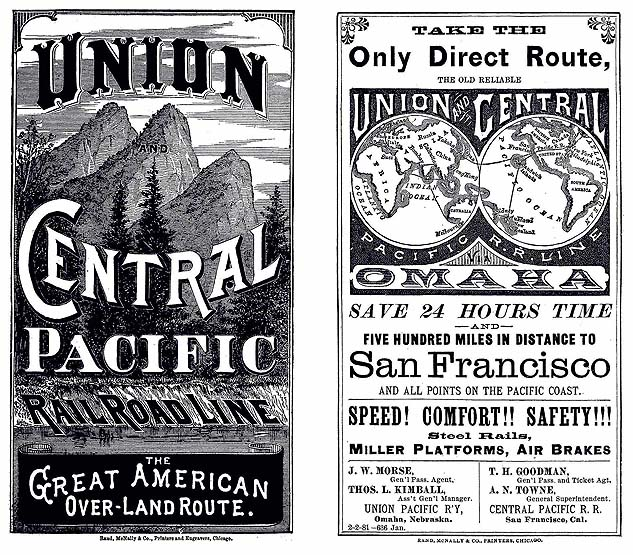
CPRR/UPRR "The Great American Over-land Route" Time Table cover (1881)

The first contiguous transcontinental rail service on "The Great American Over-land Route" between the eastern terminus of the Union Pacific on the Missouri River at Council Bluffs, Iowa/Omaha, Nebraska via Ogden, Utah (CPRR) and Sacramento (WPRR/CPRR) to the San Francisco Bay at the Oakland Wharf was opened over its full length in late 1869. At that time just one daily passenger express train (and one slower mixed train) ran in each direction taking 102 hours to cover that 1,912 miles of the just completed Pacific Railroad route. The first class fare between Council Bluffs/Omaha and Sacramento (the end of the Central Pacific Railroad proper) was $131.50. The additional fares on connecting trains east of Omaha/Council Bluffs on other lines were $20.00 to St. Louis, $22.00 to Chicago, $42.00 to New York, and $45.00 to Boston. Round trip first class 30-day excursion fares between Omaha and San Francisco in 1870 ranged from $170 per person for groups of 20 to 24 to $130 for groups of 50 or more plus $14 for each double sleeping berth. During the decade of the 1870s the schedule was shortened by only 3 hours. In 1881 the scheduled time for the by then 43 mile shorter trip from Council Bluffs to San Francisco was about 98 hours. The first class fare had dropped to $100 with the combined charges for sleeping car accommodations on the Pullman's (UP) and Silver (CP) Palace Cars totaling $14 for a double berth and $52 for a Drawing Room that slept four.

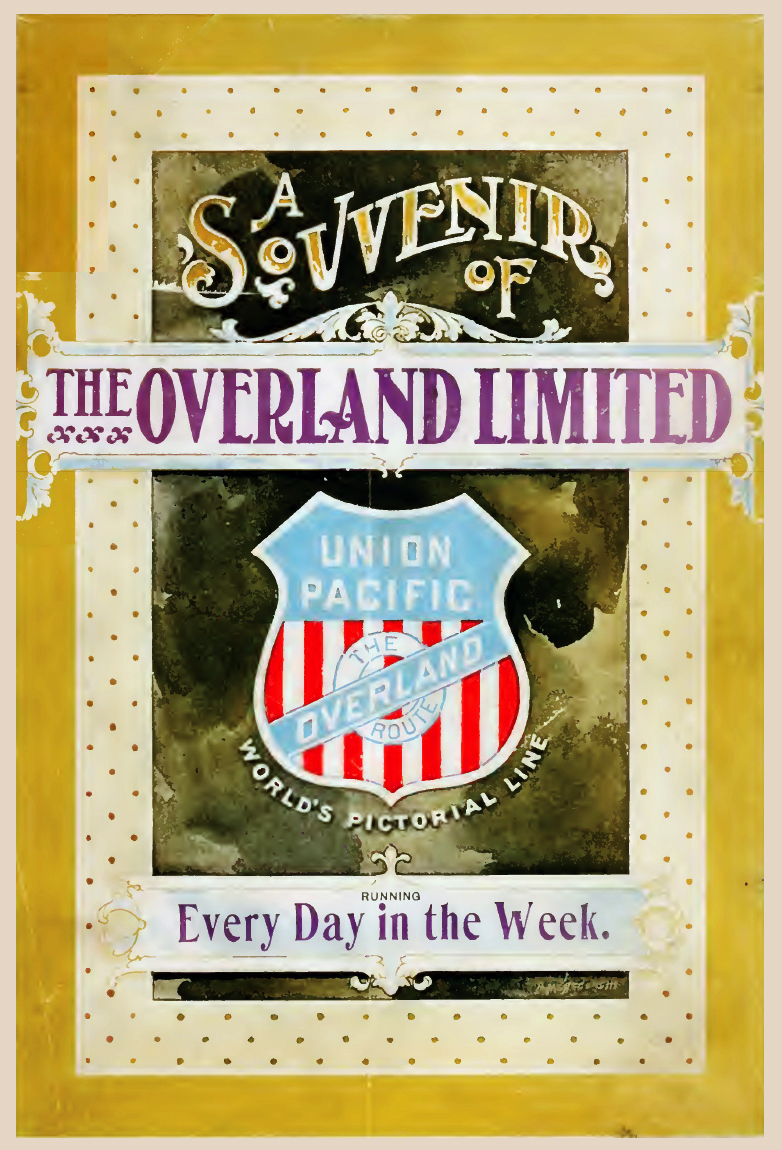

The first train on the route to include "Overland" in its name was the UP's Overland Flyer which went into service on November 13, 1887 connecting with the SP's Pacific Express (westbound) and Atlantic Express (eastbound) at Ogden. Between Chicago and Council Bluffs connecting service was provided by the Chicago and North Western. The Overland Limited's formal name varied during its long career although it was generally referred to colloquially as the Overland regardless of whatever other nouns might be attached. The Union Pacific introduced the Overland Flyer on November 13, 1887 and renamed it the Overland Limited on November 17, 1895. On December 5, 1888 the SP joined with the UP to introduce its first deluxe transcontinental service, the weekly Golden Gate Special, between San Francisco/Oakland via Ogden to Council Bluffs where passengers connected with the C&NW's trains 1 and 2 to and from Chicago although that extravagant extra-fare train was dropped after just five months. The cost for travel between San Francisco and Council Bluffs on this train was $60 for the First Class passage and $40 in extra fare for sleeping accommodations and meals in the dining car.

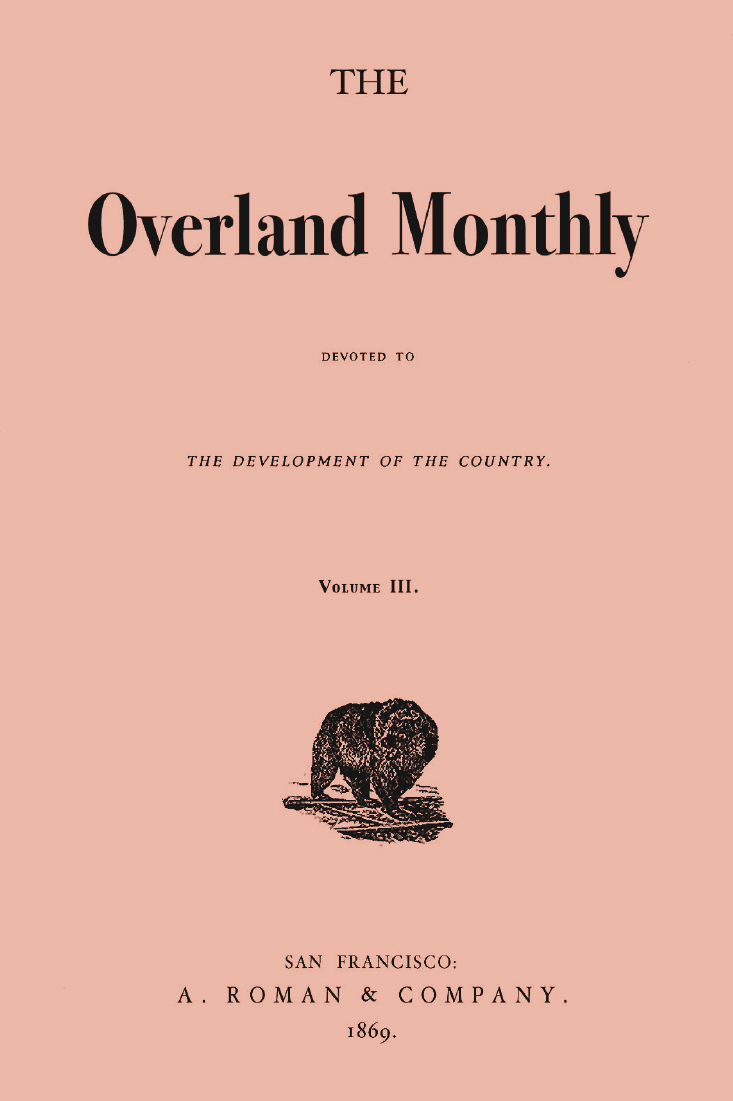
Monthly Overland 1869

The name Overland had its roots in the West. In 1868, the chronicler of the California Gold Rush, Bret Harte, had founded a monthly literary magazine based in San Francisco named the Overland Monthly while previously various stagecoach companies such as the Butterfield Overland Mail had incorporated "Overland" into their names. The Overland was the subject of an early train documentary film short in 1901. For a period of a few years in the early Twentieth Century beginning in 1905, the Overland used the Milwaukee Road between Chicago and Council Bluffs. Lucius Beebe contends that a possible reason for this the Union Pacific always intended to coerce better performance from the Chicago and North Western, and in fact a section of the Overland continued to use the C&NW during the period. (The C&NW would retain its close partnership with the UP between Chicago and Council Bluffs/Omaha for its various through Overland and City trains for another half century until the Milwaukee Road finally took over all that service on October 30, 1955.)

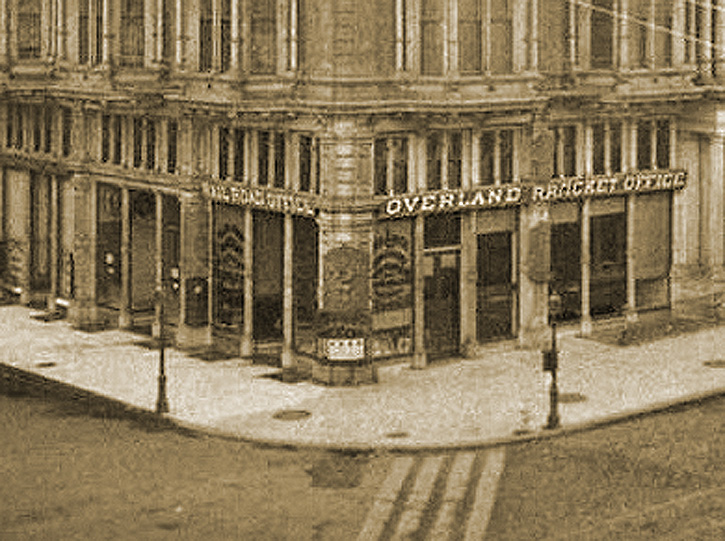
Overland RR ticket office, Palace Hotel (San Francisco), c. 1890.

For the next decade the Overland's connection at Ogden to and from San Francisco was with the eastbound Atlantic Express and westbound Pacific Express until October 15, 1899 when the SP inaugurated its own new Overland Limited (TR1&2) which became the UP's identically named Ogden to Omaha/Council Bluffs train providing 71-hour through service. The SP described its new first class train as "An Elegant Solid Vestibuled Train of Composite Car, with library, Smoking Parlor, Buffet, etc. Luxurious Double Drawing-room Sleeping Cars, Dining Car. The Fastest Overland service in the history of transcontinental railroading." On January 1, 1913 the Overland Limited became an extra-fare ($10) train when it further cut its running time from 68 to 64 hours and added amenities such as a barber, manicurist, stenographer, bath, etc. Known variously as both the Overland Limited and San Francisco Overland Limited for the next 32 years, on May 31, 1931 the service again became the San Francisco Overland Limited when its train numbers changed from "1 and 2" to "27 and 28", and on July 10, 1947 the designation "Limited" was dropped from the name altogether.

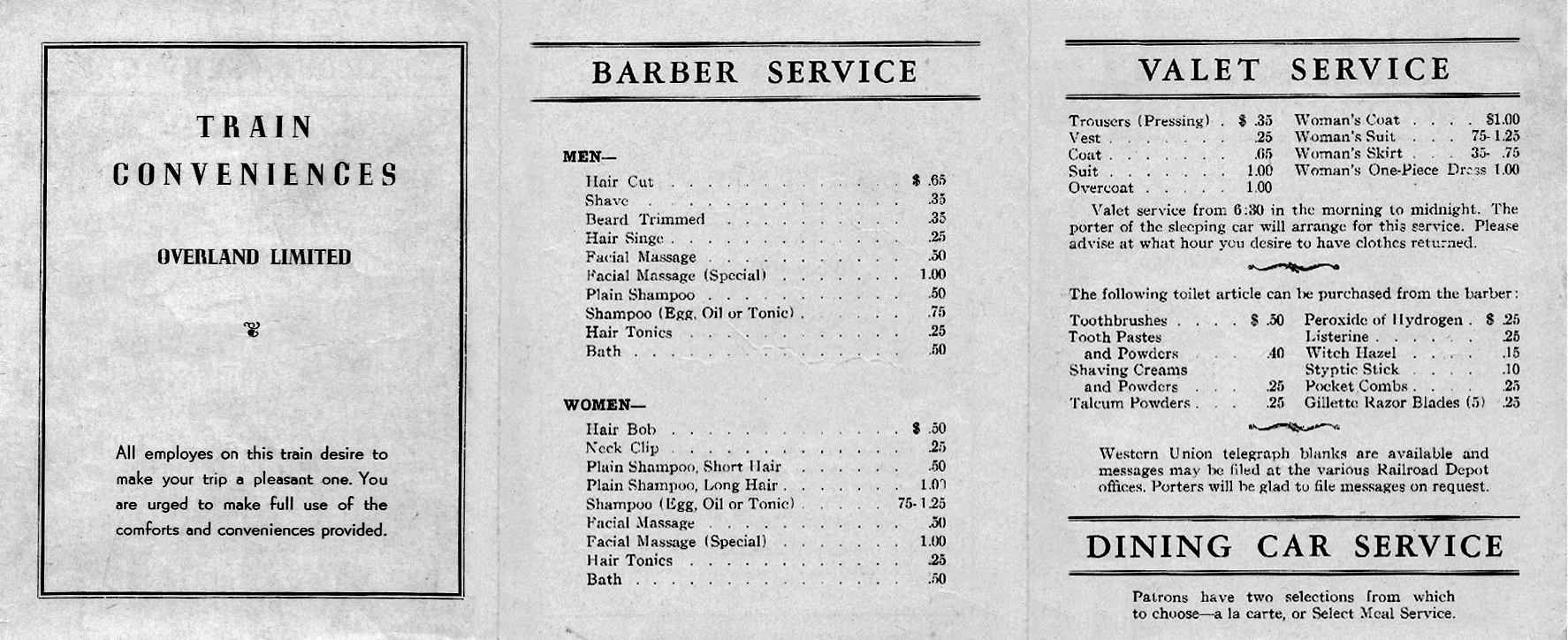
Listing of Overland Limited on board passenger services and prices (c. 1920).

== Demise ==
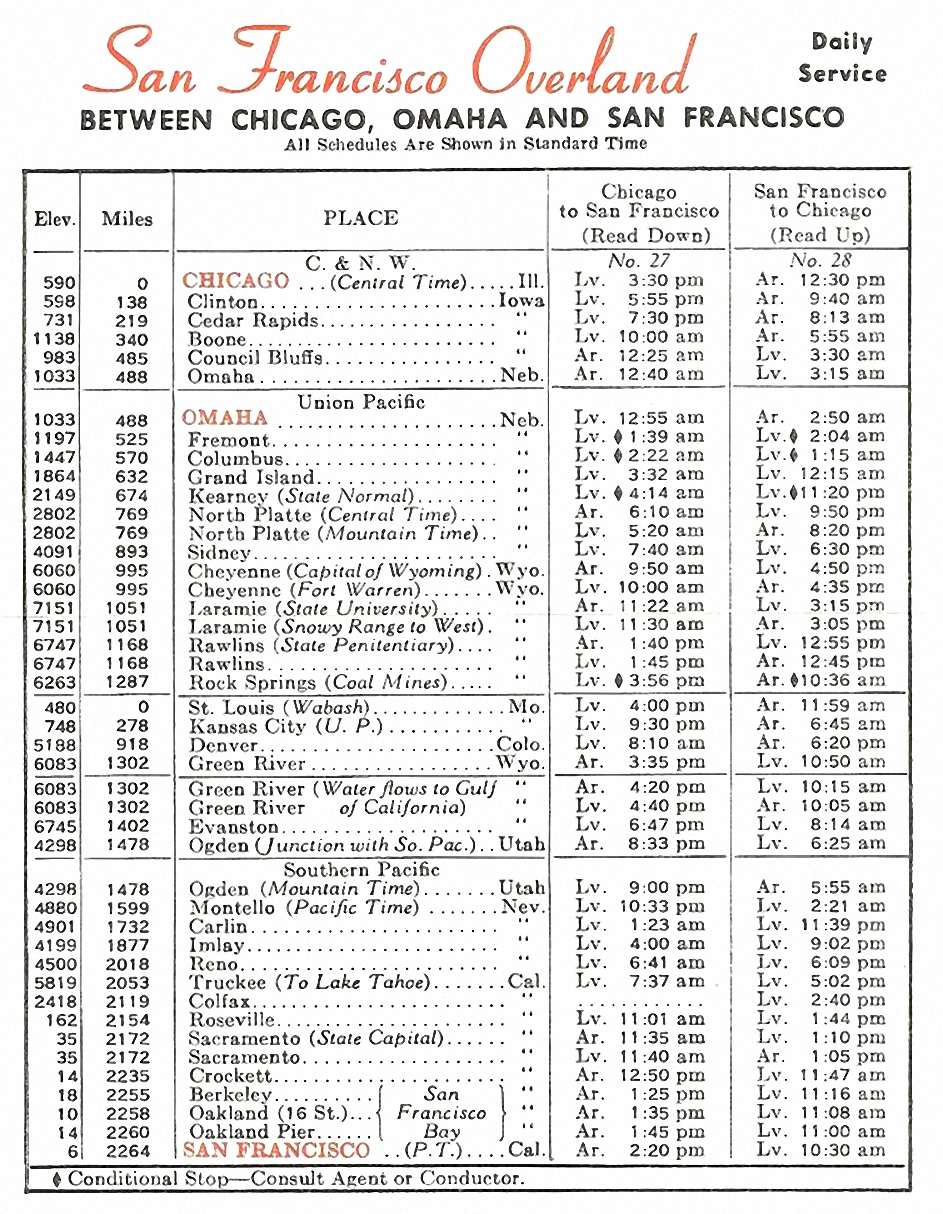
Overland schedule (1951).

The introduction of the then five-times-a-month dieselized streamliner City of San Francisco in 1936 began the relegation of the Overland to secondary status on the Overland Route. By January, 1955 the train carried only two Chicago–Oakland through cars and ceased operation on the C&NW altogether on October 30, 1955. While the UP the dropped any Overland designation from its service in 1956, the SP held out for another six years retaining the name San Francisco Overland for trains 27 and 28 between San Francisco and Ogden until that last vestige of the line's original 1899 Overland Limited as a separate named train providing year-round daily service ended on July 16, 1962. On that date the ICC's recent order (Docket #21946) approving of its discontinuation and consolidation with the City of San Francisco went into effect and new Overland Route schedules were instituted. The Overland continued only as titular seasonal summer and holiday service consolidated with the City of San Francisco except when run as an occasional second section if heavy seasonal traffic warranted until January 2, 1964 after which the Overland name disappeared forever from the route. The SP declined to revive the train's name in 1964 amid some controversy.

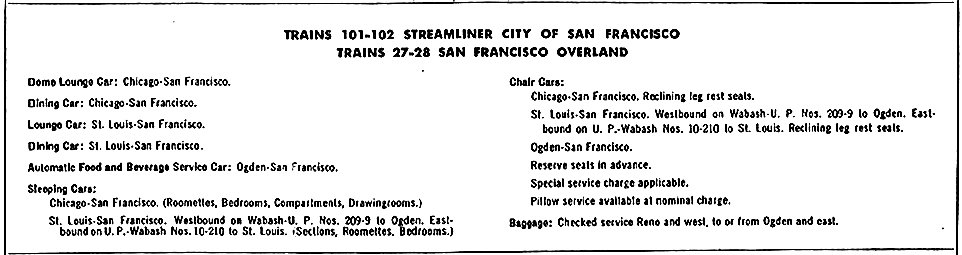
City of San Francisco and San Francisco Overland consolidated consist (effective July 16, 1962).

== Equipment ==
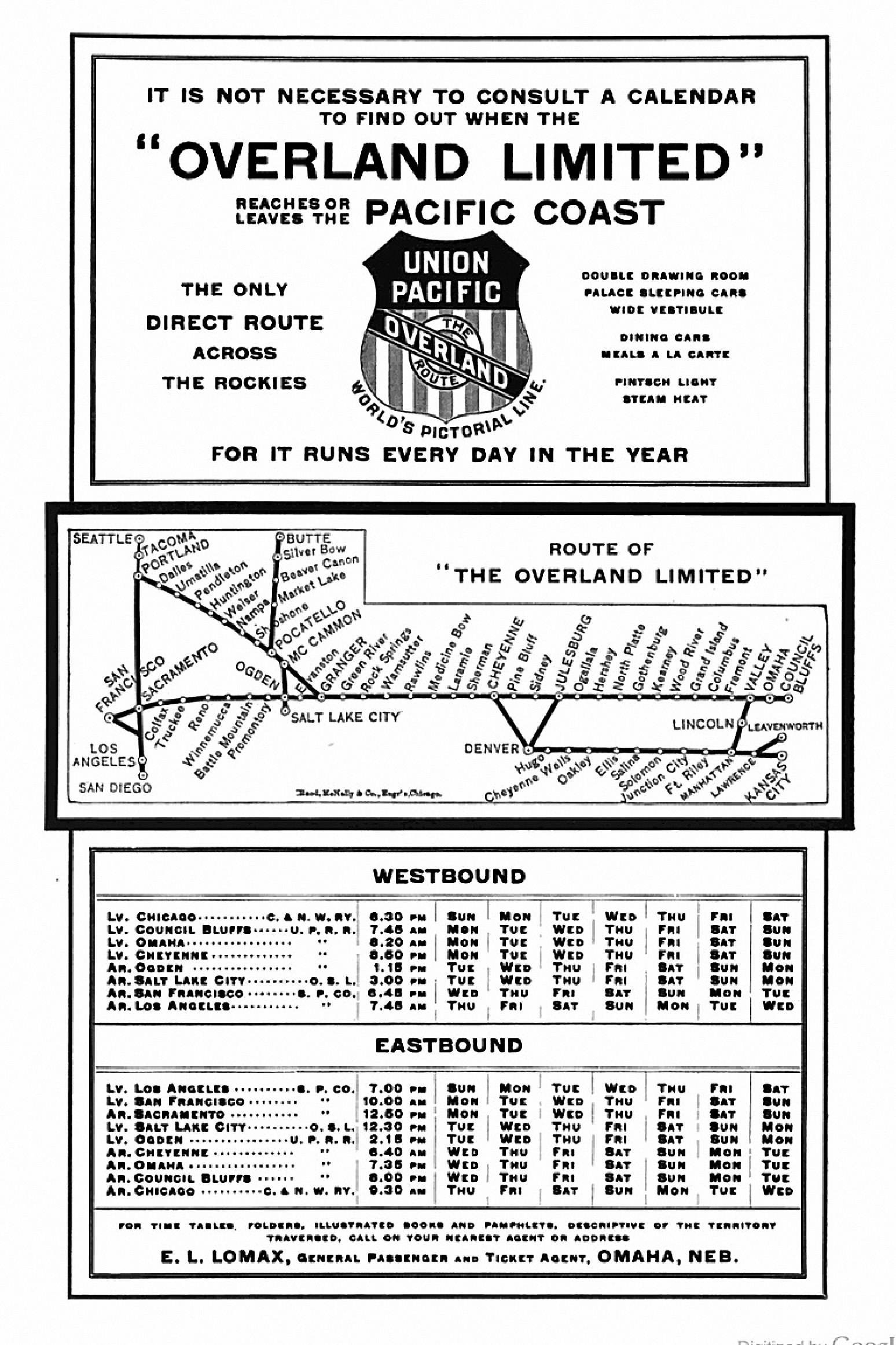
Overland Limited (1901)

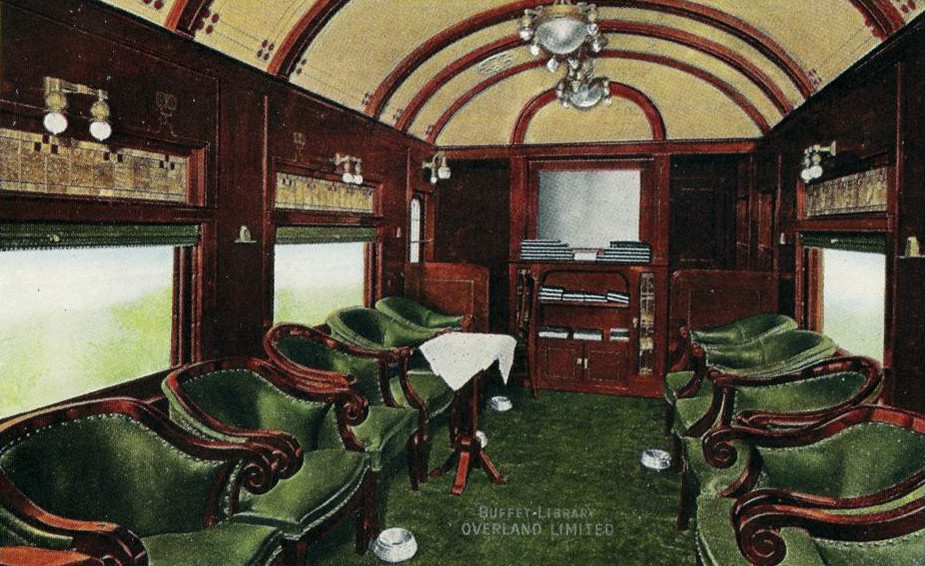
The buffet-library car 1913

With the Depression raging, the previously all-Pullman Overland began to carry chair cars in 1931, a service which lasted through much of the rest of that decade. In 1941–42 the Pullman-Standard Company built two groups (60 "6-6-4" and 18 "4-1-4") of streamlined light-weight sleeping cars for the UP (54), SP (13) and C&NW (11) and three groups totaling 70 similar style head-end and chair cars for the UP for use on all their trains servicing their Overland Routes to the west coast from Los Angeles to Seattle.

To meet the 366% increase by mid-1943 from pre-war levels in WWII related military and civilian passenger traffic, the consists on the again all-Pullman San Francisco Overland Limited ballooned to as many as 20 cars with service that also often ran in multiple daily sections. Chair car service returned to the Overland in 1946 and the consist became all lightweight streamlined cars by 1951. A dome-lounge car was also added by the SP on the train west of Ogden by 1955. In March 1952, toward the end of its existence as an independent through train, the San Francisco Overland carried Chicago–San Francisco sleepers, a New York–San Francisco sleeper conveyed on alternating days by the New York Central Railroad's Wolverine and the Pennsylvania Railroad's Pennsylvania Limited, and a summer-only sleeper for Yellowstone Park conveyed to the Idahoan at Green River, Wyoming.

The Southern Pacific introduced a "Hamburger Grill" car between Oakland and Ogden on October 24, 1954. The SP said the burgers were among "the finest meat products of Southern Pacific territory", whether or not this was true isn't really known." Lucius Beebe was unimpressed, noting the car, and the coffee-shop car which replaced it, as part of the decline of the train.

== Route diagrams ==
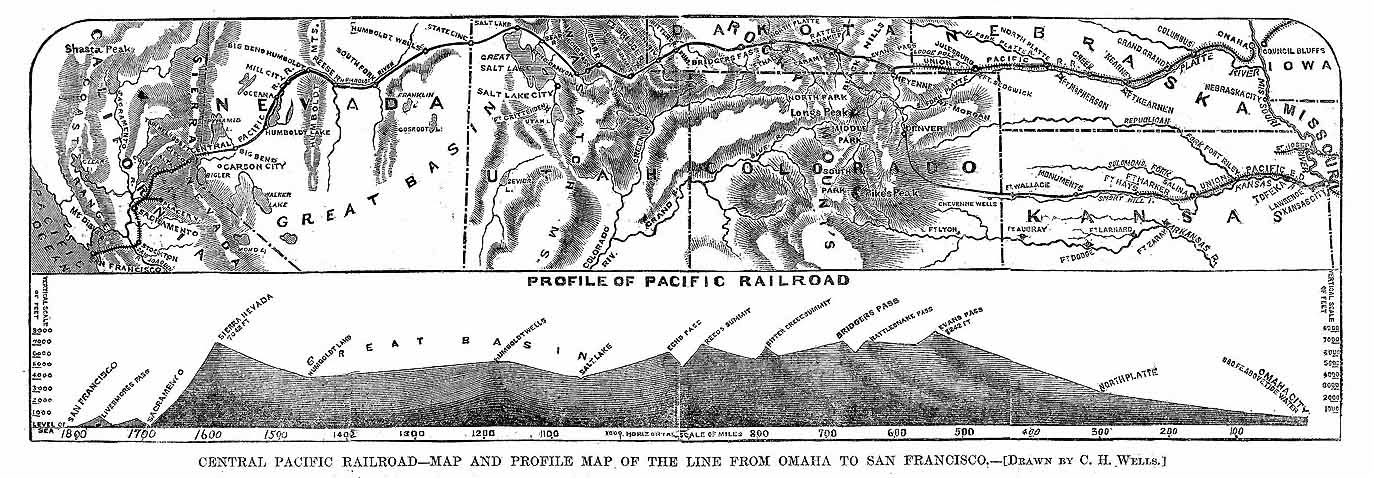
Original "Profile of the CPRR/UPRR "Over-Land Route" of the Pacific Railroad" (1867 engraving)

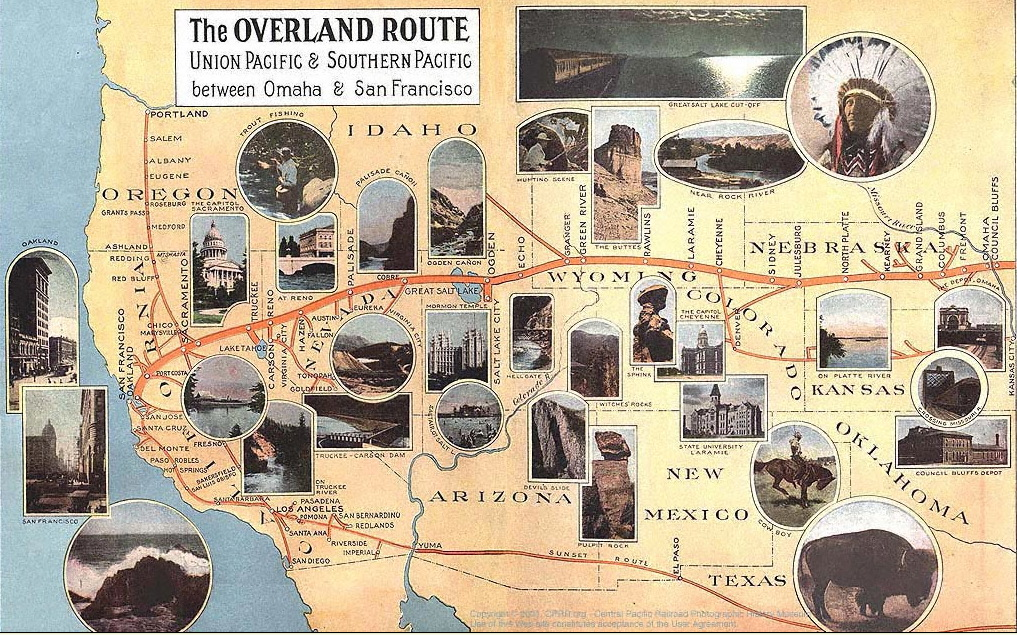
"The Overland Route to the Road of a Thousand Wonders: The Route of the Union Pacific & Southern Pacific from Omaha to San Francisco - A Journey of Eighteen Hundred Miles Where Once the Bison & the Indian Reigned"Union and Southern Pacific Railroad Passenger Departments, 1908.

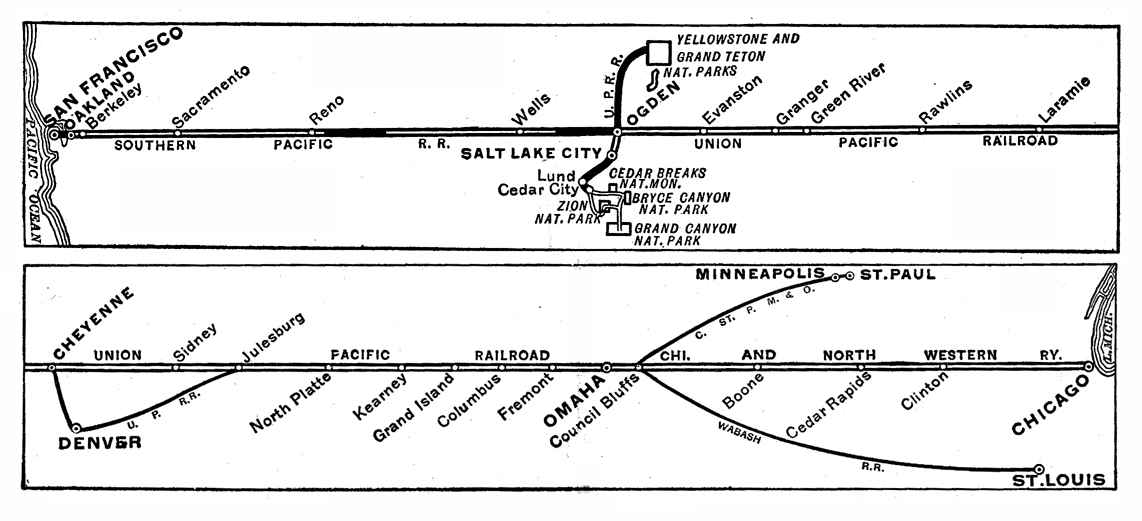
Route diagram with connections of the San Francisco Overland Limited (1943)

== In popular culture ==
Under the name Overland Flyer this is the train robbed by the outlaw gang in the film Butch Cassidy and the Sundance Kid, as well as in real life by the gang of the actual outlaw Butch Cassidy, forming the events on which the film is based. On screen, the train was represented by narrow gauge equipment from the Denver & Rio Grande Western Railroad, including a K-28 class locomotive.

== See also ==
- Overland Limited of the Atchison, Topeka and Santa Fe Railway
- Passenger train service on the Union Pacific Railroad
