= Overland Limited (ATSF train) =

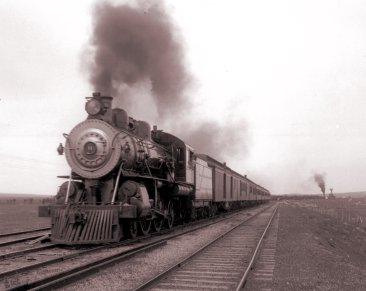
- The Overland Limited carried passengers for portion of what was billed as the "Greatest Masonic Pilgrimage Ever" upon its inauguration in 1901

Overview
- First service: 1901
- Last service: 1915
- Successor: Eight
- Former operator(s): Atchison, Topeka and Santa Fe Railway

Route
- Termini: Chicago; Los Angeles
- Train number(s): 7/8

The Overland Limited was one of the named passenger trains on the Atchison, Topeka and Santa Fe Railway.

Operating as train Nos. 7 & 8 (sometimes known as the Overland Express) between Chicago, Illinois, and Los Angeles, California, the line was inaugurated in 1901 and ran until the Santa Fe Eight took over the route in 1915. First-class trains included a diner, while second-class trains stopped along the way at Fred Harvey Company eating houses.

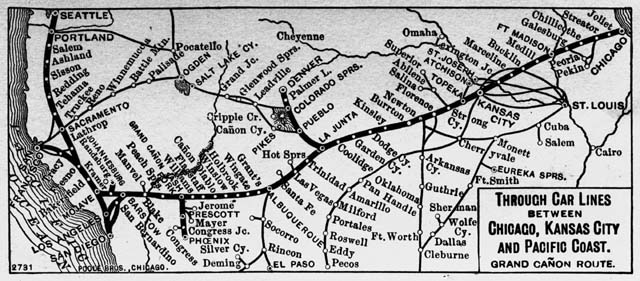
A map depicting the "Grand Canyon Route" of the Atchison, Topeka & Santa Fe Railway circa 1901.

== See also ==
- Overland Flyer, later the Overland Limited, of the Union Pacific Railroad
- Passenger train service on the Atchison, Topeka and Santa Fe Railway
