= Overland (TV series) =

- Also known as: Overland World Truck Expedition
- Genre: Documentary
- Created by: Beppe Tenti
- Directed by: Beppe Tenti, Gigi Ceresa, Roberto Pinnelli
- Country of origin: Italy
- Original language: Italian
- No. of seasons: 21 (2020)

Production
- Production company: Overland Network SRL

Original release
- Network: Rai 1, Rai HD (since 2013)
- Release: 1995 – present

Overland or Overland World Truck Expedition is a documentary series about expeditions promoted and organized by Beppe Tenti.

The documentaries are broadcast from 1996 on RAI 1, for a total of more than 150 episodes (replicated on several occasions). From the thirteenth season Overland is also broadcast in high definition on RAI HD.

The centerpiece of these expeditions is the re-discovery of the journey by land, combined with the aim of obtaining a snapshot of the planet and its culture in the late 20th century and early 21st century.

== Solidarity ==
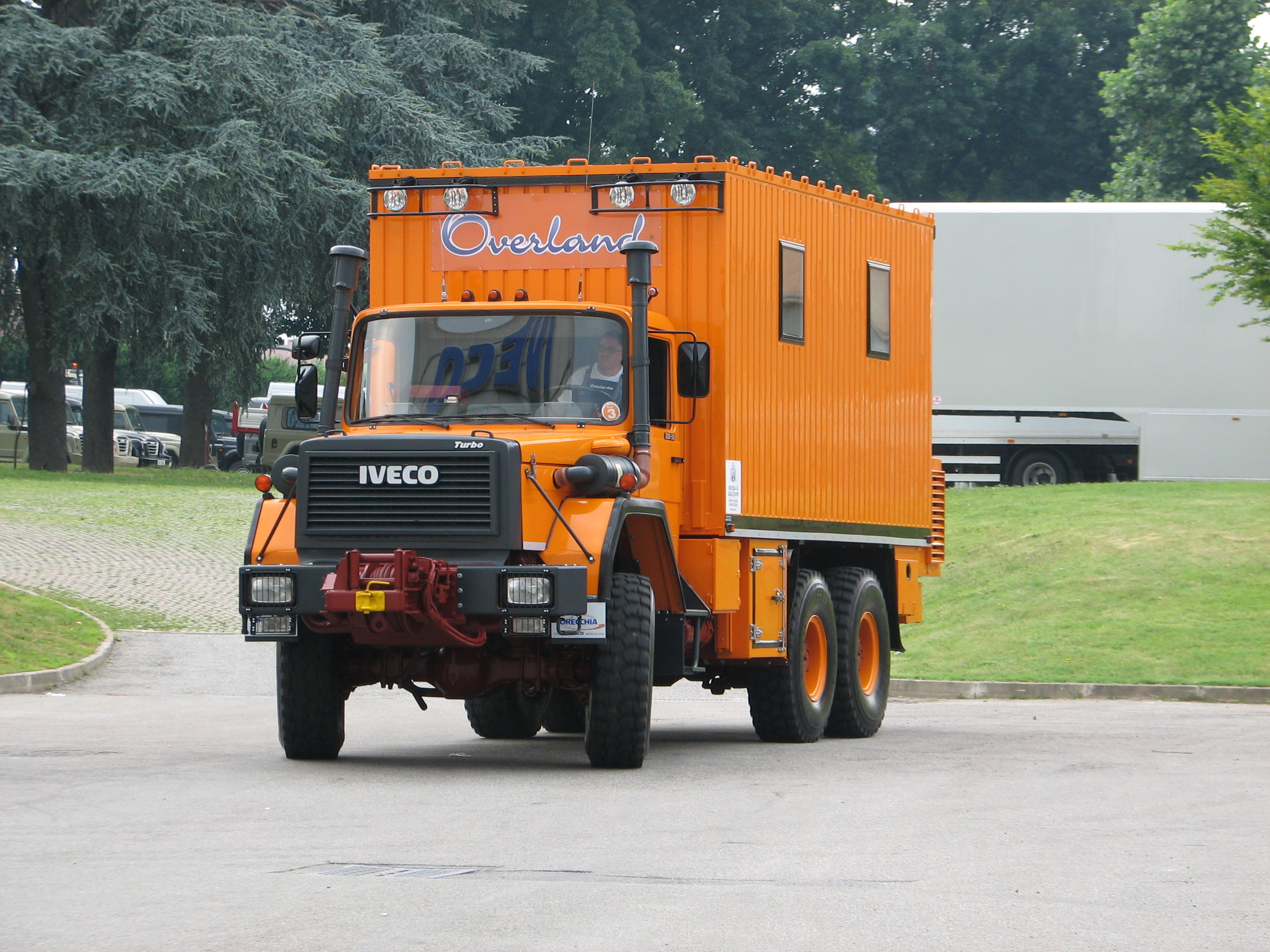
One of the trucks involved in the expedition

Overland has always been a beneficial, active and contributory objective: It has been at the forefront of UNICEF in many of the countries crossed using, whenever possible, medical care to assist populations.

It also supported the Italian Association for Cancer Research (Associazione Italiana per la Ricerca sul Cancro, AIRC). Since 2005, on a proposal by Lionello Grossi, supports the association Overland for Smile which provides dentistry care to children living in orphanages in Eastern Europe.

In 2010, with the twelfth edition of Overland, thanks to agreements with the Italian Development Cooperation, CUCI (University of Parma) and other organizations, has set up a medical vehicle equipped with specialized personnel with the task of surveying the health situation in some of the areas crossed by the expedition, as well as to distribute informational materials, so as to identify possible future interventions of ad hoc cooperation.

In the same shipment is the CinemArena project, a traveling cinema that uses one of the historic 330.30 ANW as support for the projection screen. The aim of the project is to inform the people of the small villages about the risks and prevention of different diseases, all using the documentary tools.

== Expeditions ==
The project Overland was founded in 1995 with the ambitious aim of tracing a portrait of our planet, exploring the far corners and creating an exceptional diary broadcast on Rai. The numbers of Overland, already today, are impressive: 13 expeditions in 16 years, more than 421,000 km of total mileage (approximately 8 times the circumference of the Earth), covered in over 1460 days travel through 372 borders of countries belonging to the disparate geographical areas and climatic zones of the planet.

Overland is part of a larger project to Beppe Tenti for the "rediscovery" of the over-land trip.

With Overland 1, the crossing from Rome to New York was completed in 1996, the focus has shifted to the New World, Overland 2 (New York–Tierra del Fuego–São Paulo) crossed from one end to the other of the Americas in 1997. The third expedition, Overland 3, held in 1998, saw the caravan traveling along Africa, the Arabian Peninsula and Europe from the most southerly point of Africa, Cape of Good Hope, to the further north in Europe, the North Cape. But the adventure continues and in 1999 with Overland 4 and 5 with the four trucks traveling by Asia.

In 2002, Overland 6 runs through the Mediterranean and the Sahara. Later were broadcast in 2004 Overland 7 - Back in Siberia (extended footage of Overland 1), in 2005 Overland 8 - The rediscovery of the Americas (extended footage of Overland 2), and in 2006 Overland 9 - Three Continents (extended footage of Overland 3). Meanwhile, in 2005 Overland 10 discovers a new flavor changing means: traveling by bicycle from Como to Beijing. Two years later, the expedition gets the centennial Itala, winner of the first raid in history in 1907 from Beijing to Paris. This car was taken of the old museum and kept it together in Overland 11 retraces his steps back a hundred years later, returning to Beijing where he was playing in the company (among other means) of a Fiat 500, which also makes his return to Italy with 500 Overland. A small break of a few years and 2010 sees the fulfillment of two expeditions, Overland 12 and 13.

Overland 12 calls into track two of the four historic "Musoni" alongside four new Iveco vehicles (a Trakker 6x6, two 4x4 and a Daily Massif 4x4), to return to the African continent traveling completing the perimeter, from Morocco to the Cape of Good Hope and then up in Cairo: one of the most extreme and difficult expeditions carried out to date, according to the expedition leader Beppe Tenti.

In Overland 13 adventure is especially technology, which aims to showcase the best of Italian research in the field of mobility: the protagonists of this unprecedented challenge are 4 Piaggio Porter electric-powered and equipped with a system of autonomous driving, traveling 15,000 km to Expo 2010 from Milan to Shanghai. An adventure in a futuristic technology that recalls the legendary Peking-Paris of 1907, the first continental crossing of motor vehicles, past and present protagonists are the Italians and their ingenuity, Technical and Organizational. The suggestive itinerary is played between the folds of history and maybe, for once, has less frenetic pace than the average of previous expeditions.

Overland 14, the first edition with the car as the only mode of transport, was placed in Caucasus: Georgia, Azerbaijan, Armenia and Caucasus countries of the Russian Federation as Chechnya, Ossetia and Ingushetia.

=== Overview of the expeditions ===
- Overland 1: Rome–New York, 1995-1996
- Overland 2: New York–Tierra del Fuego–São Paulo, 1997
- Overland 3: Cape Town–North Cape, 1998
- Overland 4: Lisbon–Beijing, 1999
- Overland 5: Beijing–Rome, 1999
- Overland 6: Genoa–Sahara–Turin, 2002
- Overland 7: Extended footage of Overland 1
- Overland 8: Extended footage of Overland 2
- Overland 9: Extended footage of Overland 3
- Overland 10: Como–Beijing (Cycling marathon), 2005
- Overland 11: Paris–Beijing (100 years of rally Beijing–Paris), 2007
- Overland 500: Nanjing–Bologna (Bologna Motor Show) 2007
- Overland 12: Turin–Cape Town–Rome, 2010
- Overland 13: Milan–Shanghai (Expo), 2010
- Overland 14: Caucasus, 2013
- Overland 15: from terracotta warriors to the Taklamakan dunes, 2014
- Overland 16: Bolivia and Peru, 2015
- Overland 17: Southeast of Asia: Thailand, Malaysia, Cambodia and Myanmar, 2016
- Overland 18: Islamic streets, Central Asia and Middle East, 2017
- Overland 19: India, 2018
- Overland 20: From Italy to Guinea, 2019
- Overland 21: Nordic countries, 2020
