= Indra Øverland =

- Born: 1973 (age 52–53)
- Education: University of Cambridge
- Scientific career
- Fields: Energy Politics
- Workplaces: NUPI

Indra Øverland is a specialist on the social science of energy and climate issues in Southeast Asia and Central Asia. He was educated at the University of Cambridge, UK.

He is Research Professor and Head of the Centre for Energy Research at the Norwegian Institute of International Affairs. Some of his main works include The Misallocation of Climate Research Funding, The ASEAN Climate and Energy Paradox, The Geopolitics of Renewable Energy: Debunking Four Emerging Myths, The GeGaLo Index: Geopolitical Gains and Losses after Energy Transition, Public Brainpower: Civil Society and Natural Resource Management, and Energy: The missing link in globalization.

He is known for his contribution of the concept 'slippery slopes' to the theorisation of the resource curse. 'Slippery slopes' refers to the difficult decision that authoritarian and semi-authoritarian rulers make between crackling down on opposition or allowing it to simmer, and the potential role of natural resource rents in making this decision.

Overland appears regularly as a commentator in the media and has been cited in Al Jazeera, Associated Press, BBC, Bloomberg, CBC, CNN, de Volkskrant, El País, Forbes, Financial Times, Helsingin Sanomat, Het Financieele Dagblad, Hokkaido Shimbun, Le Monde, Le Point, Newsweek, Politico, Rzeczpospolita, The Economist, The Guardian, The Straits Times, The New York Times, The Telegraph, Times Higher Education, Toronto Star, Tribune de Geneve, Wall Street Journal.

== See also ==
- Afghans in Tajikistan
