= Short Line Bridge =

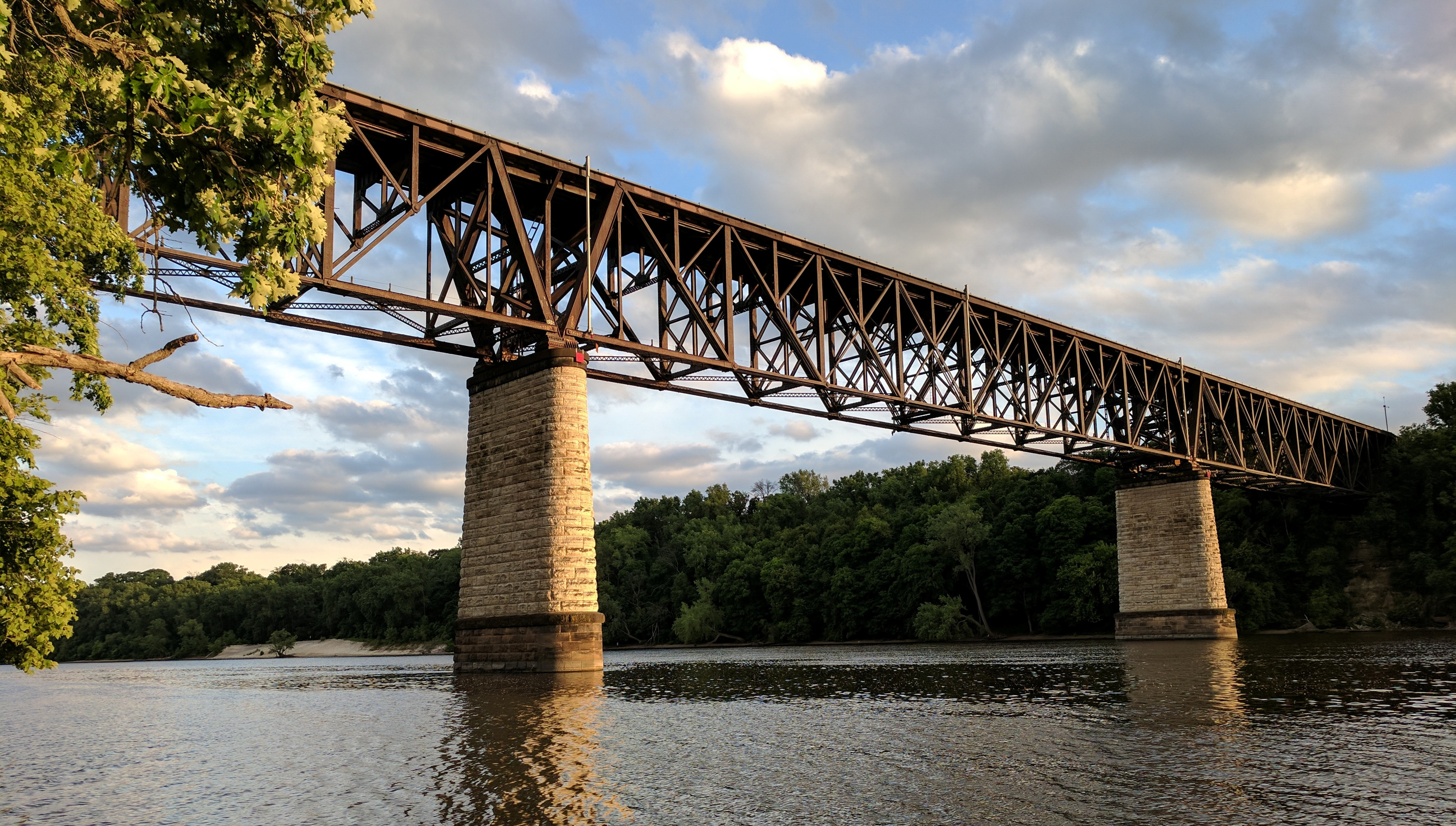
- Short Line bridge in 2017
- Coordinates: 44°57′23″N 93°12′45″W
- Carries: Minnesota Commercial Railway; Soo Line (1986–1995); Milwaukee Road (1880–1986) * Hiawatha (1935–1971) * Pioneer Ltd (1880–1971)
- Crosses: Mississippi River
- Locale: Minneapolis, Minnesota
- Owner: Canadian Pacific Railway

Characteristics
- Design: Baltimore truss
- Material: Steel, stone
- Total length: 1,164 ft (354.8 m)
- Width: 22 ft (6.7 m)
- Height: 134 ft (40.8 m)
- Longest span: 324 ft (98.8 m)
- No. of spans: 3
- Piers in water: 2
- Clearance below: 76 ft (23.2 m)

Rail characteristics
- No. of tracks: 1

History
- Constructed by: American Bridge Co.
- Opened: 4 December 1880
- Rebuilt: 1902

Location
- Interactive map of Short Line Bridge

The Short Line Bridge is a truss bridge that spans the Mississippi River in Minneapolis, Minnesota, United States. It was originally built in the 1880s and upgraded a few years later by Chicago, Milwaukee, St. Paul and Pacific Railroad and was designed by American Bridge Company.

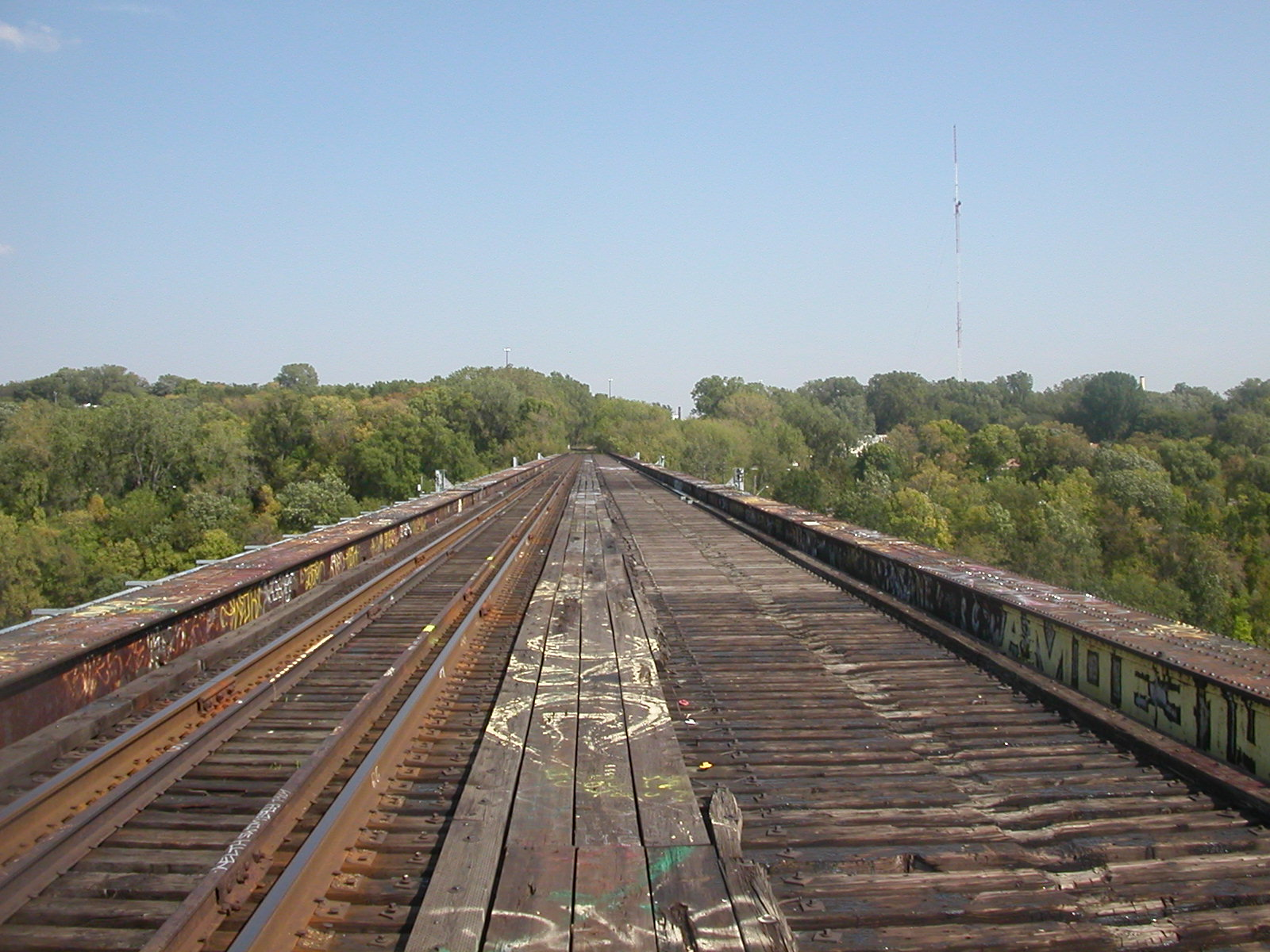
Top of the deck, 2005

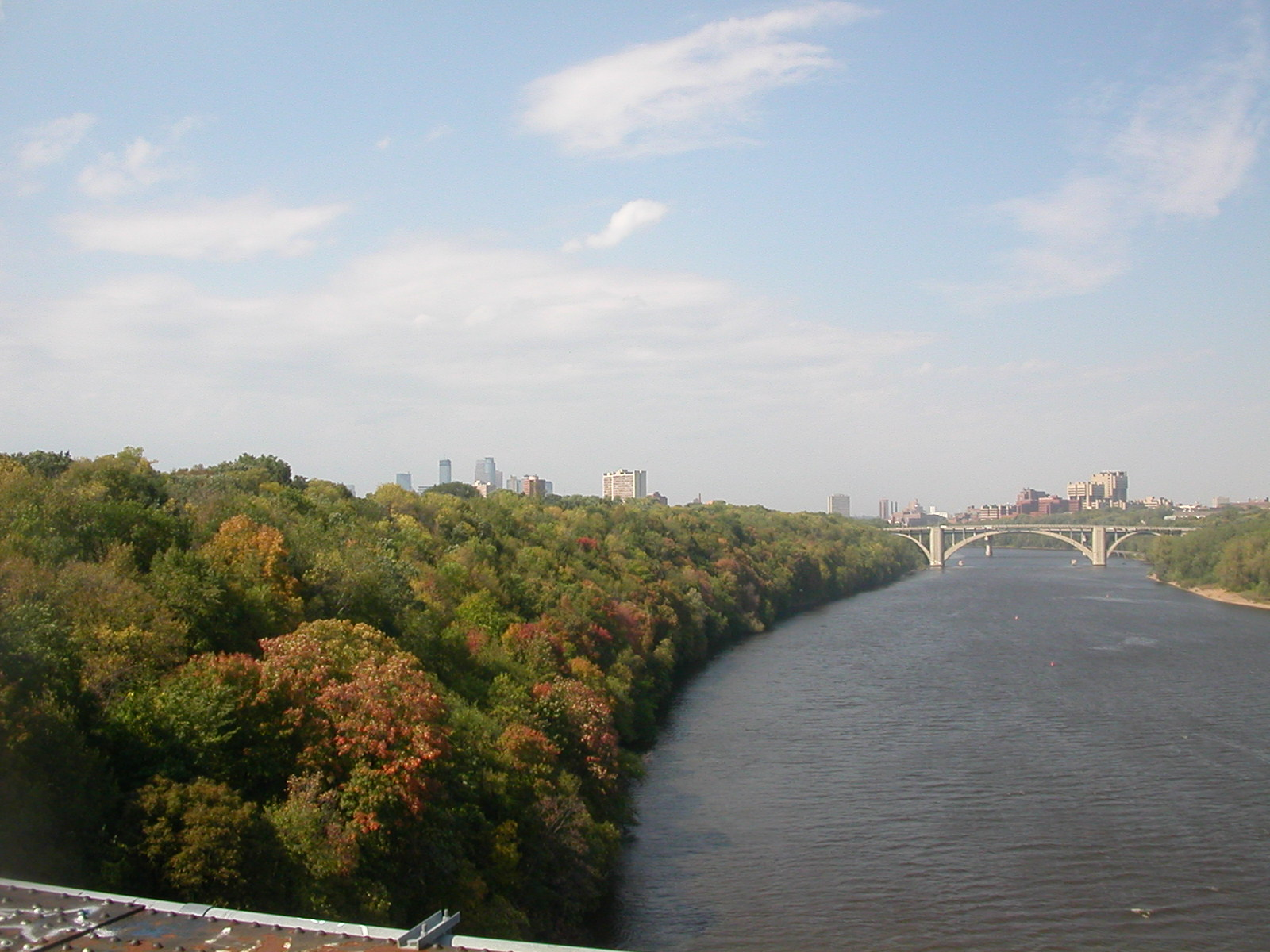
View of Downtown from the top of the deck in Autumn 2005

The bridge is entirely within Minneapolis but the railroad line crosses into St. Paul less than a half mile to the east. The name "Short Line" comes from the Milwaukee Road's construction of a shorter, more direct connection between St. Paul and Minneapolis. Previously the connection was made via a line that headed southwest along the Mississippi River, north at Mendota and northwest via Fort Snelling to downtown Minneapolis. The "Short Line" was part of a number of construction projects in the 1880s that also included a roundhouse and yard near the present-day junction of Lake Street and Hiawatha Avenue, as well as a line to the west just north of Lake Street (today's Midtown Greenway).

As railroad traffic became less important in the Twin Cities in the latter part of the 20th century, the Milwaukee Road gradually abandoned several of its lines in the area. It still found use for the Short Line Bridge route, however, as did Milwaukee Road successors Soo Line Railroad and Canadian Pacific. The bridge was also used by the Twin Cities and Western Railroad. Through trains continued to cross the bridge until the former Milwaukee Road was severed at Lake Street as part of the reconstruction of Hiawatha Avenue (Minnesota State Highway 55). The bridge is still used today by the Minnesota Commercial Railway to service grain elevators along Hiawatha Avenue. There has been some discussion about using the bridge as a connection for the Midtown Greenway across the Mississippi River, but Canadian Pacific has not been receptive to the idea.

In July 2006 there was a severe fire on the bridge which caused $200,000 in damage, closing down rail traffic until it could be repaired. Originally the cause was thought to have been small fireworks, but later appeared to be arson, by dousing the bridge in gasoline. The bridge in the specific spot could only hold at maximum 50 pounds of weight. To prevent people from hurting themselves, local authorities patrolled each side of the bridge from 6:00 pm – 6:00 am in the days following the event. Now a fence blocking access to the bridge states that any trespassers will be fined and/or serve jail time. There was a smaller fire at an unknown date prior to this incident. The bridge was repaired within a few weeks in order to continue to serve a few customers of the west side of the river that had no other rail access aside from this line. Special ties were brought in from across the country to repair the damaged area.

== See also ==
- List of crossings of the Upper Mississippi River
