= Gallatin Gateway Inn =

- U.S. National Register of Historic Places
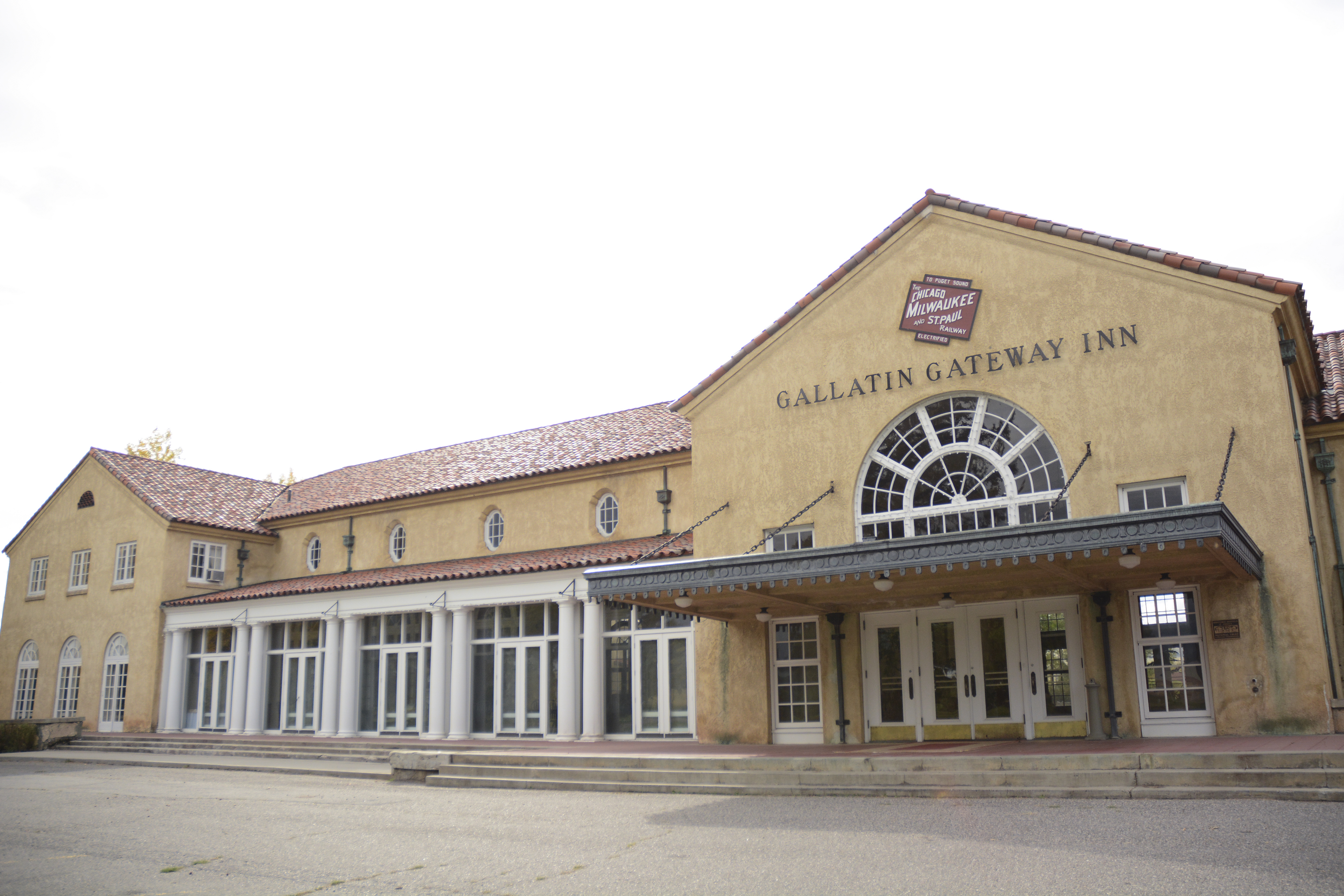

- Location within Montana Location within the United States
- Location: U.S. 191, Gallatin Gateway, Montana
- Coordinates: 45°35′37″N 111°11′54″W
- Area: 15.3 acres (6.2 ha)
- Built: 1927
- Architect: Schack, Young & Myers
- Architectural style: Mission/Spanish Revival
- NRHP reference No.: 80002417
- Added to NRHP: January 24, 1980

The Gallatin Gateway Inn is a Spanish-stucco style railroad hotel at Gallatin Gateway, Montana. The hotel is one of the "Historic Inns of America." The Gallatin Gateway Inn was opened on June 18, 1927. Constructed and operated by The Milwaukee Road (Chicago, Milwaukee, St. Paul and Pacific Railroad), the luxury hotel was reached by electrified railroad branch line that connected to the Milwaukee's main line at Three Forks, Montana. It was among the first hotels in Montana with telephones in every room, and offered travelers access to Yellowstone National Park. Park buses took passengers from the hotel to the park.

It was the first hotel built and operated by the Milwaukee Road. The hotel was originally built to promote tourism on the Milwaukee Road's Olympian and Columbian passenger trains. The hotel was restored in the 1980s. It was added to the National Register of Historic Places on January 24, 1980, a month before the Milwaukee Road left the Northwestern United States.

Following a foreclosure in February 2013, the Inn was purchased and renovated by M&M Hospitality. In 2015 the building was leased to the Yellowstone Club to provide housing for Yellowstone Club, Spanish Peaks Mountain Club and Moonlight Basin employees.
