= Black Hawk (CB&Q train) =

Passenger train from Chicago to Minneapolis

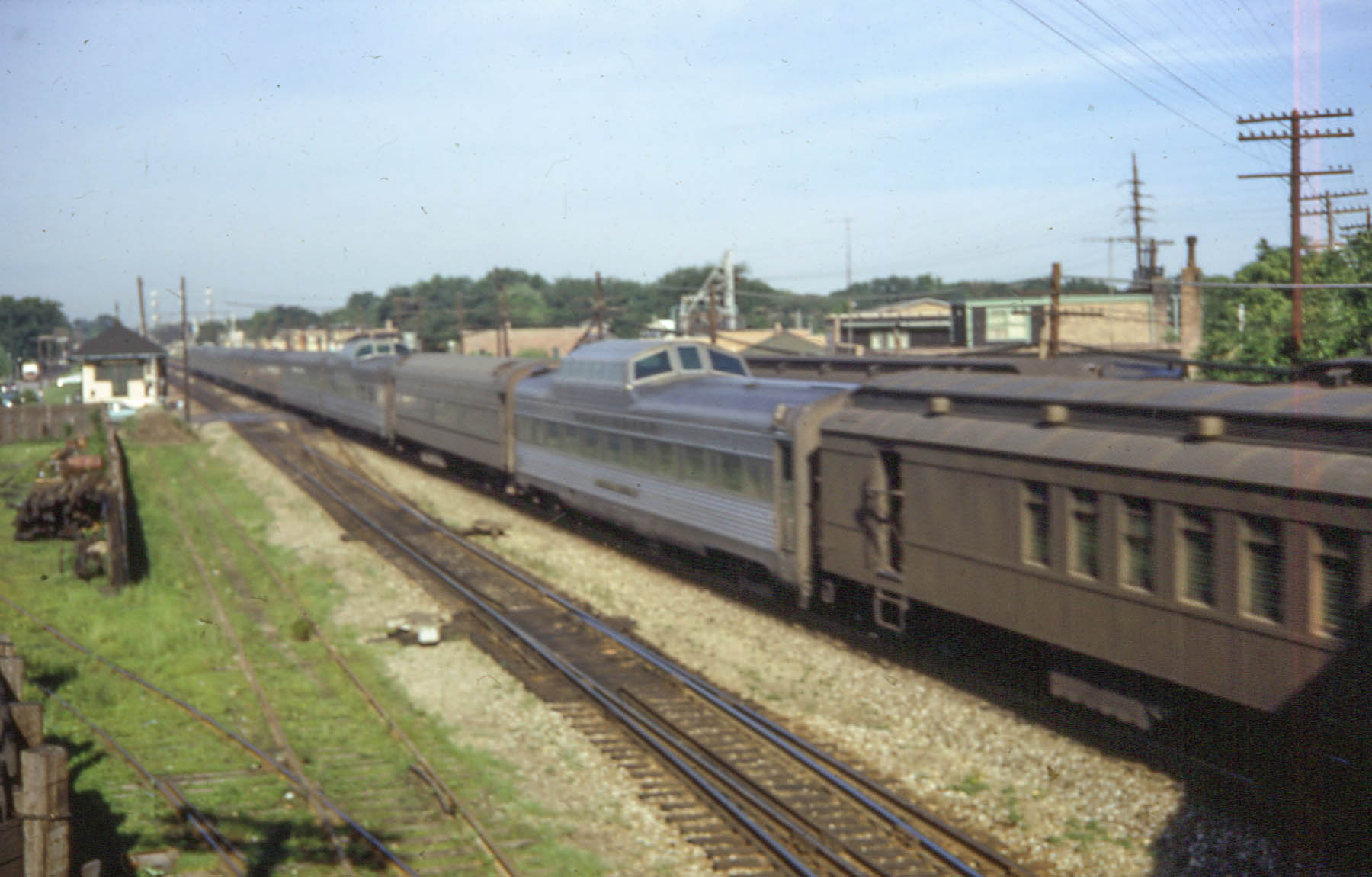
- The Black Hawk at La Vergne station in 1967

Overview
- Status: Discontinued
- Last service: April 13, 1970
- Former operators: Chicago, Burlington and Quincy Railroad, Burlington Northern

Route
- Termini: Chicago; Minneapolis
- Distance travelled: 437 miles (703 km)
- Train number: 47/48

The Black Hawk was a named passenger train operated by the Chicago, Burlington and Quincy Railroad between Chicago, Illinois, and Minneapolis/St. Paul, Minnesota, the nighttime counterpart to the Burlington's Twin Zephyrs.

At the time, the CB&Q sought to compete in the Chicago-Twin Cities overnight train market against the Milwaukee Road's Pioneer Limited and the C&NW's North Western Limited. In common with its competitors, the Black Hawk carried both sleeping cars and coaches. However, with departure well past dinnertime, the train's dining car (or diner-lounge) served only "evening refreshments" upon departure and a full breakfast the following morning. In later years, the breakfast became Continental in nature.

During its final years, the Black Hawk provided an eastbound connection with the Northern Pacific Railway's Mainstreeter, and the Great Northern Railway's Western Star. By the late 1960s it combined with the Western Star both ways, and with the Mainstreeter westbound.

The Black Hawk was discontinued after its final run on the night of April 12–13, 1970, six weeks after March 2, when the CB&Q merged into Burlington Northern.
