= Pioneer Limited =

1898–1970 passenger train from Chicago to Minneapolis

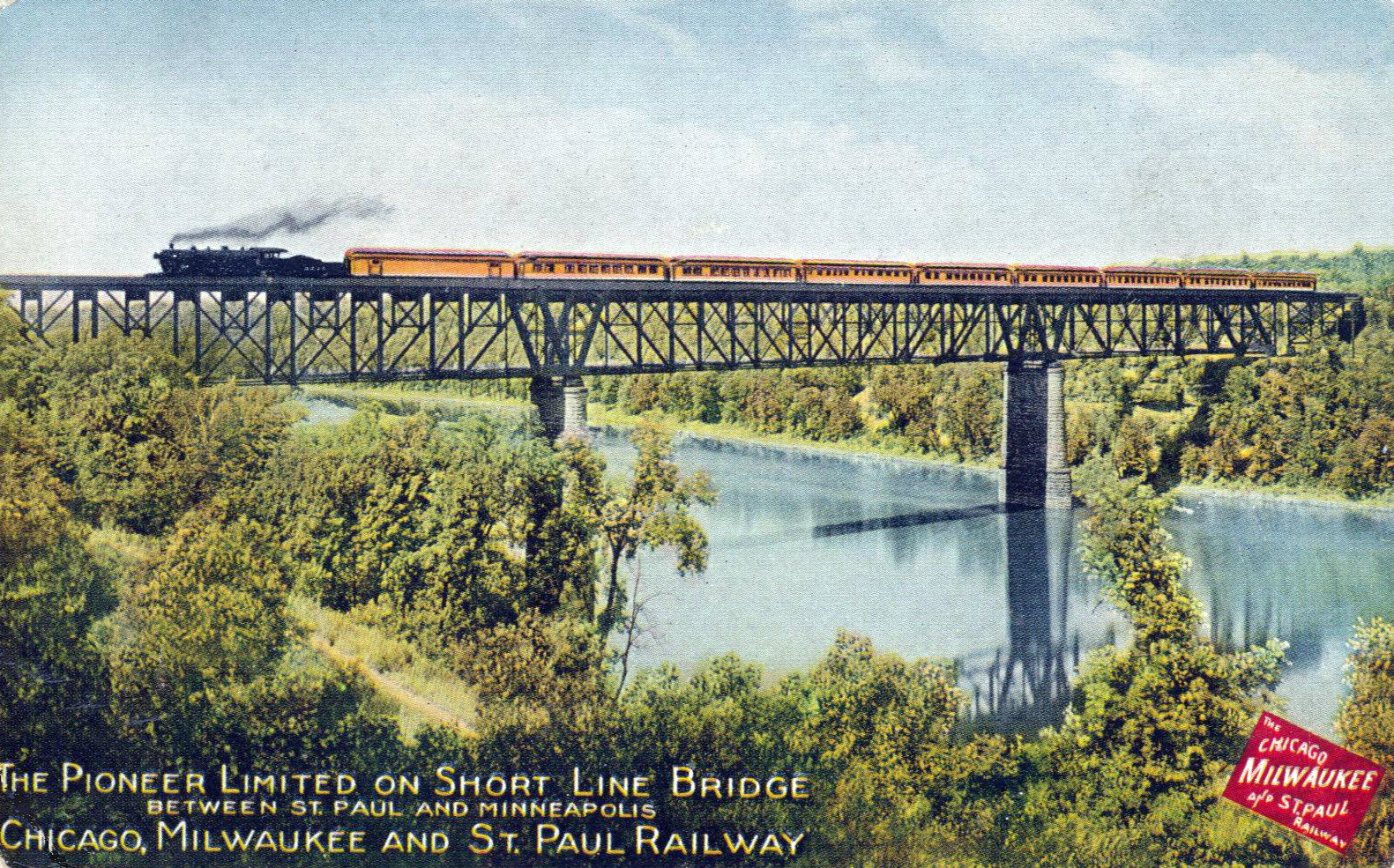
- The Pioneer Limited crossing the Short Line Bridge in Minneapolis, 1910

Overview
- Status: Discontinued
- First service: 1898; 128 years ago
- Last service: September 7, 1970; 55 years ago
- Former operator: Chicago, Milwaukee, St. Paul and Pacific Railroad

Route
- Termini: Chicago; Minneapolis
- Distance travelled: 421 miles (678 km)
- Train number: 1/4

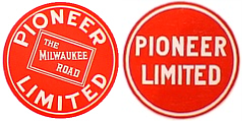
"Drumhead" logos such as these often adorned the ends of observation cars on the Pioneer Limited

The Pioneer Limited was a United States named passenger train running overnight on the Chicago, Milwaukee, St. Paul and Pacific Railroad (the "Milwaukee Road") between Chicago, Illinois, and Minneapolis/St. Paul, Minnesota. The westbound train (to Minneapolis) was Milwaukee Road train No. 1 and the eastbound was No. 4.

== History ==
The Milwaukee Road began trains No. 1 and No. 4 in 1872, the first through trains between Chicago and the Twin Cities. The Pioneer Limited name first appeared in 1898, chosen in a public contest. It was among the nation's first named trains and the first named train on the Milwaukee Road.

The 1898 train was newly equipped with Barney & Smith sleeping cars, the carriages described in a period brochure as "...a veritable edition de luxe, bound in covers of yellow and gold." The train was re-equipped multiple times in subsequent years, the last wooden cars being replaced by steel ones in 1914.

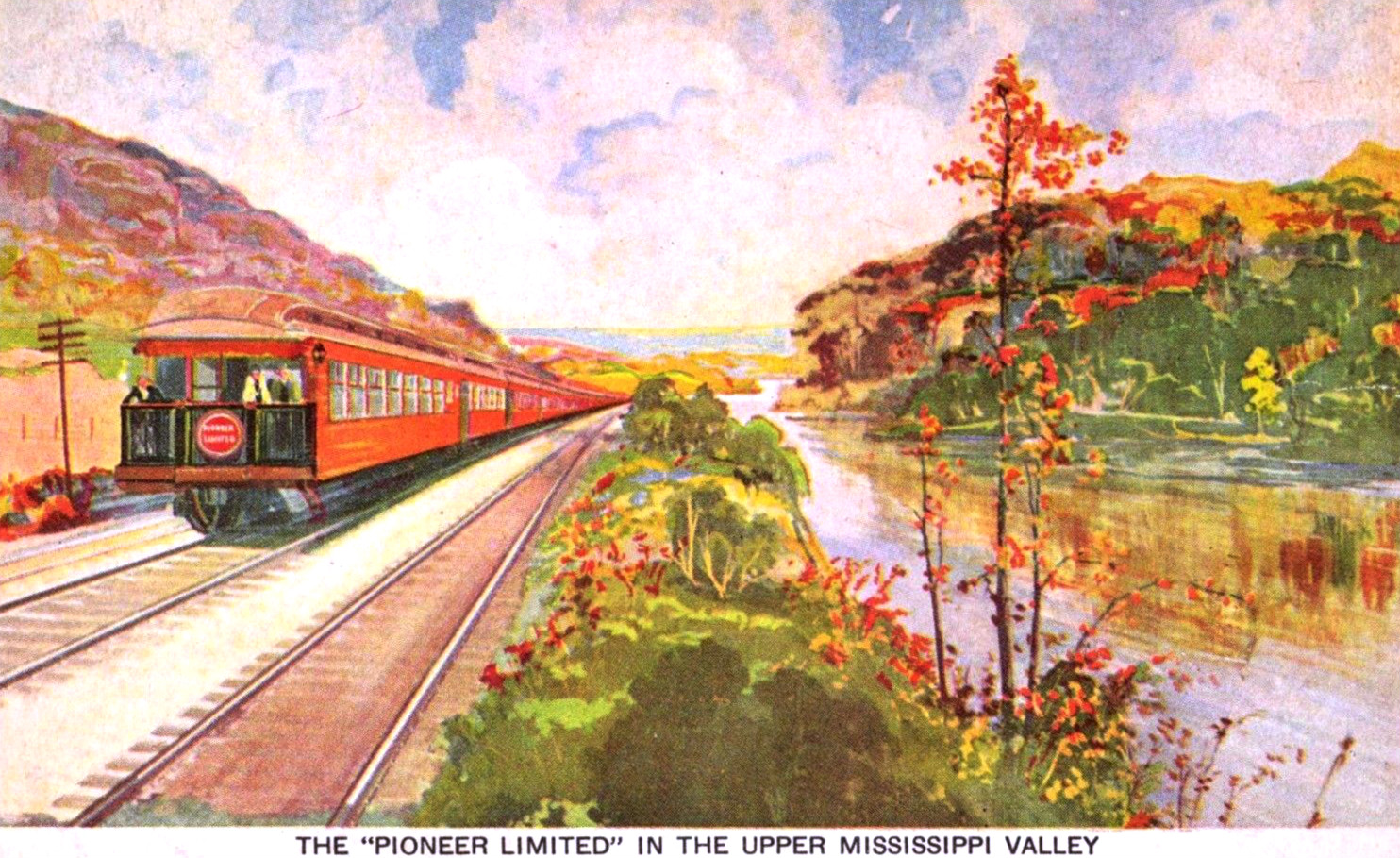
Postcard depiction of the heavyweight train.

During the train's early years the Pioneer Limited had a number of "firsts": it had the first government railway mail contract in the region, the first sleeping cars on the route, and was the region's first electrically lighted and steam-heated train. the Pioneer Limited was also noted for its dining car service.

Streamlined, all-room sleeping cars appeared on the Pioneer Limited in 1948. With streamlining, the Milwaukee Road considered changing the name of the train to Pioneer Hiawatha but deferred to passenger preferences to retain the older name. The Pioneer Limited was unusual in that its streamlined cars were home built in the Milwaukee Road's Milwaukee Menomonee valley shops. For various periods in the Pioneer Limited's career the train employed Milwaukee Road sleeping cars and attendants rather than Pullman operated cars. After 1927 the train's sleeping cars were operated by the Pullman Company

As rail passenger traffic dwindled nationwide in the 1950s, the train was combined for a time with the Milwaukee Road's Columbian passenger train, before the Columbian was discontinued. Travel by rail continued declining in the 1960s and revenues were further eroded by the ending of most federal mail contracts. The final runs of the Pioneer Limited were on September 7, 1970.

== Other overnight Chicago–Twin Cities trains ==
For much of its life the Pioneer Limited was one of three passenger trains that competed for overnight business on the Chicago-Twin Cities run — the others were the Black Hawk, operated by the Chicago, Burlington and Quincy Railroad, and the North Western Limited, operated by the Chicago and North Western Railway. The North Western Limited was discontinued on June 14, 1959, and the last runs of the Black Hawk were on April 12, 1970. The Pioneer Limited was thus the last privately operated overnight passenger train on the route.

For a time in the 1970s and early 1980s, Amtrak operated overnight rail passenger service along the route of the Pioneer Limited, as part of longer-distance routes from Chicago to either Seattle or Duluth. The last such trains departed on October 25, 1981, but the route still has a day train.
