= William John Quinn =

American businessman (1911–2015)

William J. Quinn
- Born: May 8, 1911; St. Paul, Minnesota, U.S.
- Died: October 24, 2015 (aged 104); Glenview, Illinois, U.S.
- Education: University of St. Thomas
- Occupations: Railroad executive, attorney
- Years active: 1930s–1978

William John Quinn (May 8, 1911 – October 24, 2015) was an American railroad executive. He was an attorney for the Soo Line before joining the Chicago, Milwaukee, St. Paul and Pacific Railroad in 1954, later serving as its president from 1957 to 1966. In 1966, he became president of the Chicago, Burlington and Quincy Railroad. He later returned to the Milwaukee Road, where he was chairman from 1970 until shortly after it went bankrupt in December 1977.

== Early life and education ==
Born in St. Paul, Minnesota, Quinn earned an undergraduate degree from the College of St. Thomas in 1933 and then earned a law degree from the University of Minnesota Law School in 1935.

== Career ==
After law school, Quinn worked in private law practice in Minnesota and as an assistant U.S. attorney. He then took a job with the Minneapolis, St. Paul and Sault Ste. Marie Railroad as an in-house attorney. During World War II, Quinn was posted to work for the Federal Bureau of Investigation as a counterespionage agent. After the war, he returned to the Soo Line.

In 1954 the Milwaukee Road recruited Quinn to join the railroad as a general solicitor. By 1958 he had risen up to become the railroad's president. Quinn left the Milwaukee Road in 1966 to become president of the Chicago, Burlington and Quincy. He returned to the Milwaukee Road in 1970 as chairman, shortly after the CB&Q merged into the Burlington Northern Railroad. Quinn was the last leader of the Chicago, Milwaukee, St. Paul and Pacific Railroad and was involved in its notorious scheme of de-electrification in 1972, right before the 1973 oil crisis. This and the general collapse of the road in the 1960s led to the final bankruptcy of the famous Milwaukee Road.

Quinn retired in 1978. He died in Glenview, Illinois, at the age of 104.
