= Columbian (Milwaukee Road train) =

American passenger train

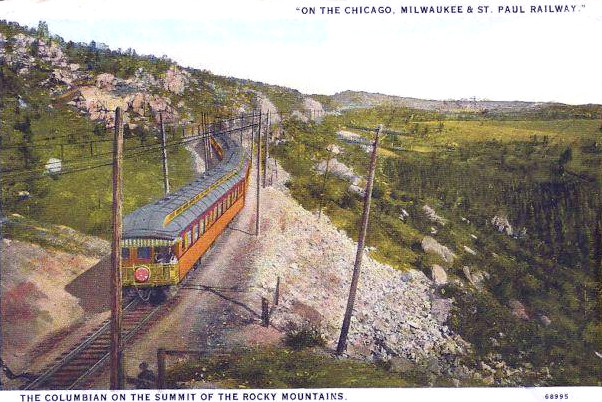
- The Columbian in 1927

Overview
- First service: May 29, 1911; 1947
- Last service: 1930; January 21, 1955
- Former operator(s): Chicago, Milwaukee, St. Paul and Pacific Railroad

Route
- Termini: Chicago, Illinois; Seattle, Washington or Tacoma, Washington
- Distance travelled: 2,189 miles (3,523 km) (Chicago-Seattle), 2,207 miles (3,552 km) (Chicago-Tacoma)
- Service frequency: Daily
- Train number(s): 17/18

The Columbian was a named passenger train operated by the Chicago, Milwaukee, St. Paul and Pacific Railroad ("the Milwaukee Road") between Chicago, Illinois, and Seattle/Tacoma, Washington. The westbound train was Milwaukee Road train #17, and the eastbound train was train #18. It was launched on Monday, May 29, 1911. The same day, the faster, limited-stop and more luxurious Olympian also launched. These were the first passenger trains to take advantage of the Milwaukee Road Pacific Extension, which had opened to freight in 1909.

== The first Columbian: 1911–1930 ==
One of the last great railroad construction projects in the United States took place in the Pacific Northwest between 1906 and 1909, when the Milwaukee Road built its new line from the Midwest to Puget Sound. The new route gave the Milwaukee Road a continuous line from Chicago to Seattle/Tacoma, an asset claimed by no other single railroad. The subsidiary Chicago Milwaukee and Puget Sound Railway Company was chartered in 1905 to build from the Missouri River to Seattle and Tacoma. At the completion in 1909, the Milwaukee began operating through freight trains on the route. Two daily Chicago - Puget Sound passenger trains were instituted on May 29, 1911—the Olympian and the Columbian. The Olympian was the premiere train on the route, with a faster schedule and more luxurious equipment; the Columbian was a secondary train, providing a more basic level of service on a slower schedule.

Both trains operated throughout the 1910s and 1920s, initially surviving the bankruptcy of the Milwaukee Road in 1925. The Columbian, however, was discontinued in 1930, the victim of a downturn in rail traffic caused, in part, by the Great Depression. The Olympian continued to serve the entire Chicago - Tacoma line, and shorter-distance trains provided additional service on parts of the route.

== The 1947–1955 Columbian ==
After the end of World War II, most American railway companies—including the Milwaukee Road—quickly began working to modernize their passenger services with new, lightweight streamliner equipment and faster schedules. By 1946, the Milwaukee had decided to re-equip the Olympian as a streamliner, adding it to its famed fleet of Hiawatha passenger trains. The new Olympian Hiawatha entered service on June 29, 1947, running on a significantly faster schedule with fewer stops. Simultaneously, the Columbian was resurrected to again provide secondary service on the entire Chicago - Tacoma route. The revived Columbian used the equipment and schedule of the pre-1947 Olympian.

As before, the 1947 Columbian served passengers traveling shorter distances (or to smaller towns), and hauled of mail and express. Compared to the Olympian Hiawatha, the Columbian was slower, made more stops, and had fewer passenger amenities. A typical timetable (from 1951) showed that the westbound Columbian was scheduled to complete the 2227-mile Chicago-Tacoma run in 61 hours, 5 minutes. In contrast, the westbound Olympian Hiawatha traveled the same route in 46 hours, 30 minutes. An end-to-end trip on the Columbian occupied three nights and two days. The train's passenger equipment included standard and "tourist" (economy) sleeping cars, coaches, and a diner-lounge car. The Columbian was the first train to use the Milwaukee Road's new station in Tacoma, arriving there on April 20, 1954.

The revival of the Columbian proved to be short-lived. Passenger traffic on the western lines of the Milwaukee Road declined significantly in the 1950s, resulting in the discontinuance of the Columbian as a through train on January 21, 1955. At the time, the operation of interstate passenger trains was partially regulated by the states, and individual state approvals were required prior to a train's discontinuance; consequently, the end of the Columbian was piecemeal. The January 21 schedule change eliminated only the western end of the Columbian run, between Avery, Idaho and Tacoma. That spring, the train's western terminus was shifted still further east—to Marmarth, North Dakota—and by summer trains 17 and 18 only operated as far west as Aberdeen, South Dakota. Soon, the Columbian was gone entirely.

== Accidents ==
The initial debut eastbound Columbian, which left Tacoma at 5:45 pm on May 29, 1911 derailed at 4:45 a.m. on May 30, 1911. The accident occurred on sharp curve near Marengo in southeastern Washington, about 60 miles from the Idaho border. The engineer and fireman were killed, five porters seriously hurt, and a baggage handler and one passenger suffered minor injuries.

On December 18, 1911, the second section of the eastbound 18 Columbian ran into the back of the first section at Odessa, Minnesota. The engine of the second 18 forced itself under the west end of the sleeper 'Beverly'. The sleeper pushed into the dining car, which telescoped into the sleeping car. Ten people were killed, and eighteen injured.
