= Milwaukee Road =

Railroad in the Midwest and Northwest United States

Chicago, Milwaukee, St. Paul and Pacific Railroad

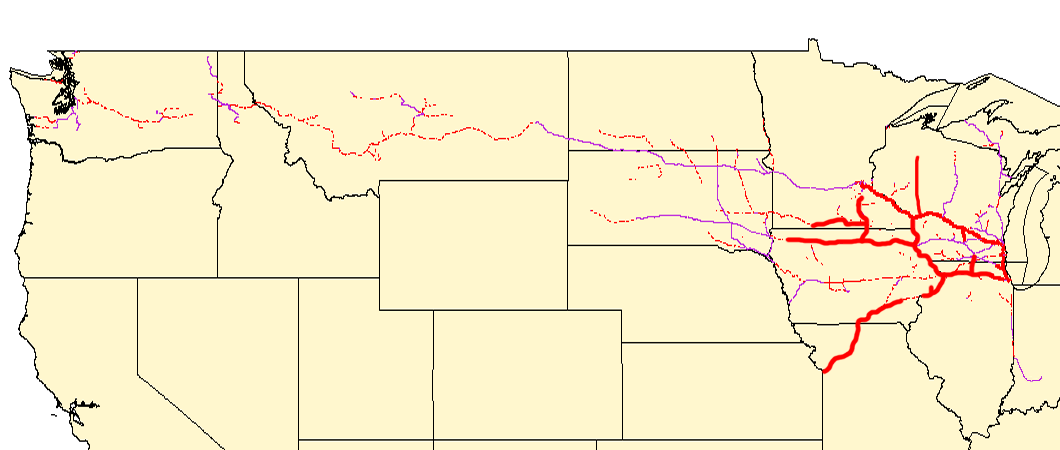
- The Milwaukee Road system map

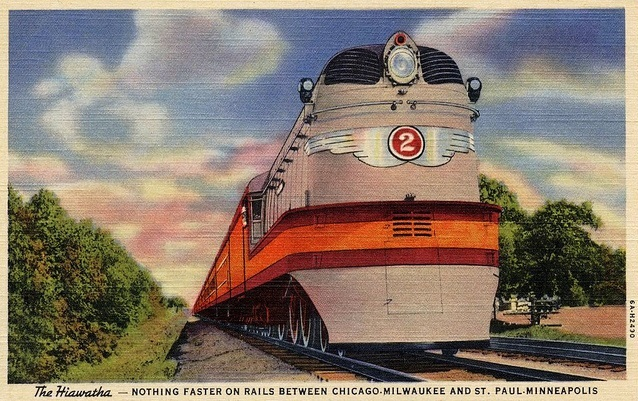
- A Twin Cities Hiawatha postcard in 1935

Overview
- Headquarters: Chicago, Illinois
- Reporting mark: MILW
- Locale: Midwestern and Western United States
- Dates of operation: 1847–1986
- Successor: Soo Line Railroad Most trackage in South Dakota and Montana is now operated by the BNSF Railway Some trackage in Washington is now operated by the Union Pacific Railroad Some trackage in the Midwest is now operated by Canadian Pacific Kansas City, Canadian Pacific Railway and Soo Line Railroad's successor. Some trackage in Wisconsin and Illinois is now operated by the Wisconsin and Southern Railroad Some trackage in Illinois is now operated by Metra

Technical
- Track gauge: 4 ft 8 1/2 in (1,435 mm) standard gauge
- Length: 11,248 miles (18,102 km) (1929); 3,023 miles (4,865 km) (1984)

The Chicago, Milwaukee, St. Paul and Pacific Railroad (CMStP&P), better known as the Milwaukee Road (reporting mark MILW), was a Class I railroad that operated in the Midwest and Northwest of the United States from 1847 until 1986.

The company experienced financial difficulty through the 1970s and 1980s, including bankruptcy in 1977 (though it filed for bankruptcy twice in 1925 and 1935, respectively). In 1980, it abandoned its Pacific Extension, which included track in the states of Montana, Idaho, and Washington. The remaining system was merged into the Soo Line Railroad (reporting mark SOO), which, at the time, was a subsidiary of Canadian Pacific Railway (reporting mark CP), on January 1, 1986. Canadian Pacific is now a subsidiary of Canadian Pacific Kansas City, after the railroad merged with Kansas City Southern Railway in 2023. Much of its historical trackage remains in use by other railroads. The company brand is commemorated by buildings like the historic Milwaukee Road Depot in Minneapolis and preserved locomotives such as Milwaukee Road 261 which operates excursion trains.

== History ==
=== Chicago, Milwaukee, St. Paul and Minneapolis Railroad ===
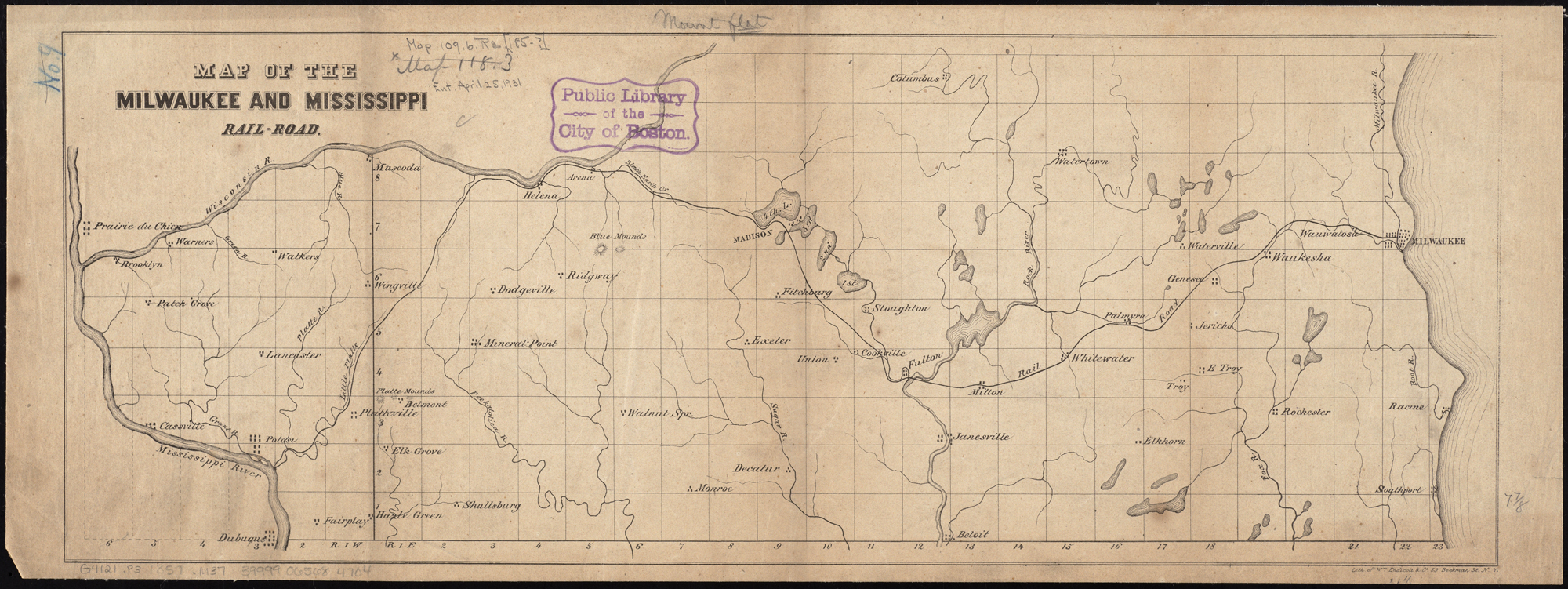
Map of the Milwaukee & Mississippi Railroad, ca. 1857

The railroad that became the Milwaukee Road began as the Milwaukee and Waukesha Railroad in Wisconsin, whose goal was to link the developing Lake Michigan port City of Milwaukee with the Mississippi River. The company incorporated in 1847, but changed its name to the Milwaukee and Mississippi Railroad in 1850 before construction began. Its first line, 5 miles (8.0 km) long, opened between Milwaukee and Wauwatosa, on November 20, 1850. Extensions followed to Waukesha in February 1851, Madison, and finally the Mississippi River at Prairie du Chien in 1857.

As a result of the financial panic of 1857, the M&M went into receivership in 1859 and was purchased by the Milwaukee and Prairie du Chien Railroad in 1861. In 1867, Alexander Mitchell combined the M&PdC with the Milwaukee and St. Paul (formerly the La Crosse and Milwaukee Railroad Company) under the name Milwaukee and St. Paul. Critical to the development and financing of the railroad was the acquisition of significant land grants. Prominent individual investors in the line included Alexander Mitchell, Russell Sage, Jeremiah Milbank, and William Rockefeller.

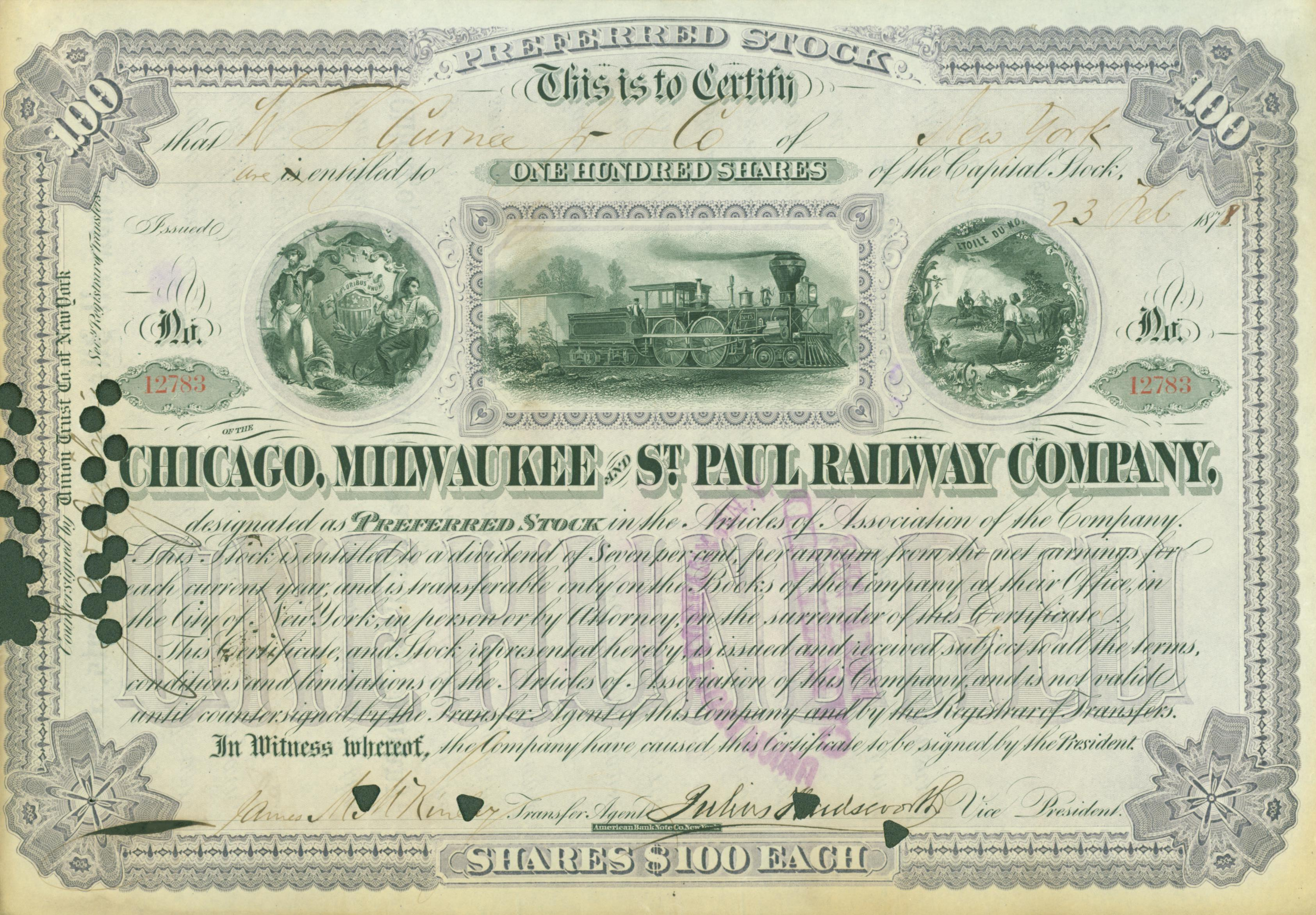
Share of the Chicago, Milwaukee and St. Paul Railway Company, issued 23 February 1878

In 1874, the name was changed to Chicago, Milwaukee and St. Paul Railway Company after constructing an extension to Chicago in 1872. The company absorbed the Chicago and Pacific Railroad Company in 1879, the railroad that built the Bloomingdale Line (now The 606) and what became the Milwaukee District West Line as part of the 36-mile Elgin Subdivision from Halsted Street in Chicago to the suburb of Elgin, Illinois. In 1890, the company purchased the Milwaukee and Northern Railroad; by now, the railroad had lines running through Wisconsin, Minnesota, Iowa, South Dakota, and the Upper Peninsula of Michigan.

The corporate headquarters were moved from Milwaukee to the Rand McNally Building in Chicago, America's first all-steel framed skyscraper, in 1889 and 1890, with the car and locomotive shops staying in Milwaukee. The company's general offices were later located in Chicago's Railway Exchange building (built 1904) until 1924, at which time they moved to Chicago Union Station.

=== Pacific Extension ===
In the 1890s, the company's directors felt they had to extend the railroad to the Pacific to remain competitive with other railroads. A survey in 1901 estimated costs to build to the Pacific Northwest as $45 million ($1.35 billion in 2024 dollars). In 1905, the board approved the Pacific Extension, now estimated at $60 million ($1.62 billion in 2024 dollars). The contract for the western part of the route was awarded to Horace Chapin Henry of Seattle. The subsidiary Chicago, Milwaukee and Puget Sound Railway Company was chartered in 1905 to build from the Missouri River to Seattle and Tacoma.

Construction began in 1906 and was completed three years later. The route chosen was 18 miles (29 km) shorter than the next shortest competitors, as well as better grades than some, but it was an expensive route, since Milwaukee Road received few land grants and had to buy most of the land or acquire smaller railroads.

The two main mountain ranges that had to be crossed, the Rockies and the Cascades, required major civil engineering works and additional locomotive power. The completion of 2,300 miles (3,700 km) of railroad through some of the most varied topography in the nation in only three years was a major feat. Original company maps denote five mountain crossings: Belts, Rockies, Bitterroots, Saddles, and Cascades. These are slight misnomers as the Belt mountains and Bitterroots are part of the Rockies. The route did not cross over the Little Belts or Big Belts, but over the Lenep-Loweth Ridge between the Castle Mountains and the Crazy Mountains.

Some historians question the choice of route, since it bypassed some population centers and passed through areas with limited local traffic potential. Much of the line paralleled the Northern Pacific Railway. Trains magazine called the building of the extension, primarily a long-haul route, "egregious" and a "disaster". George H. Drury listed the Pacific Extension as one of several "wrong decisions" made by the Milwaukee Road's management which contributed to the company's eventual failure.

Beginning in 1909, several smaller railroads were acquired and expanded to form branch lines along the Pacific Extension.

- The Montana Railroad formed the mainline route through Sixteen Mile Canyon as well as the North Montana Line which extended North from Harlowton to Lewistown. This branch led to the settlement of the Judith Basin and, by the 1970s, accounted for 30% of the Milwaukee Road's total traffic.
- The Gallatin Valley Electric Railway, originally built as an interurban line, was extended from Bozeman to the mainline at Three Forks. In 1927, the railroad built the Gallatin Gateway Inn, where passengers traveling to Yellowstone National Park transferred to buses for the remainder of their journey.
- The White Sulphur Springs & Yellowstone Park Railway, originally built by Lew Penwell and John Ringling, primarily carried lumber and agricultural products.

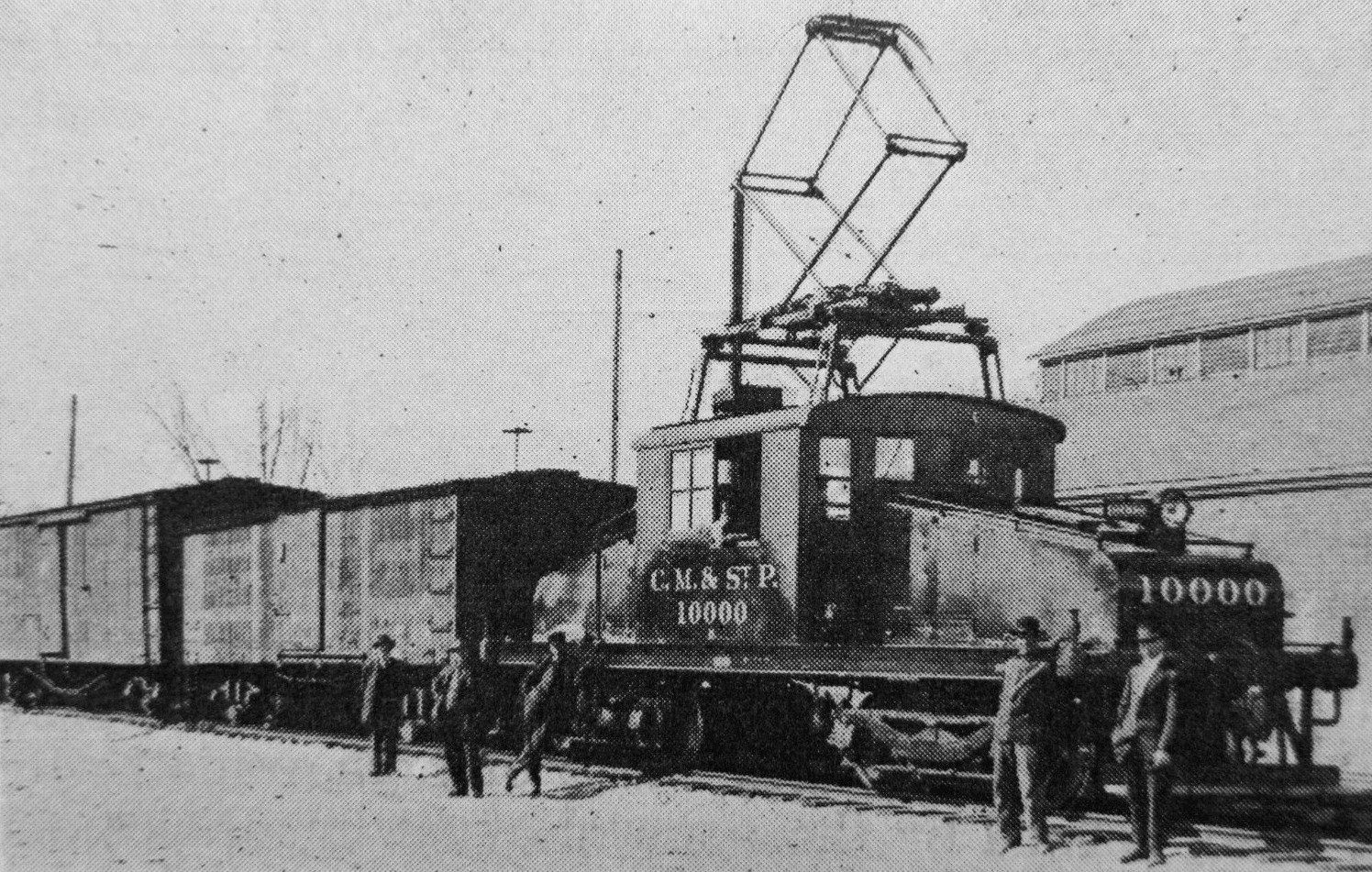
CMStP&P #10000, an ES-1 electric locomotive, with two boxcars in 1915

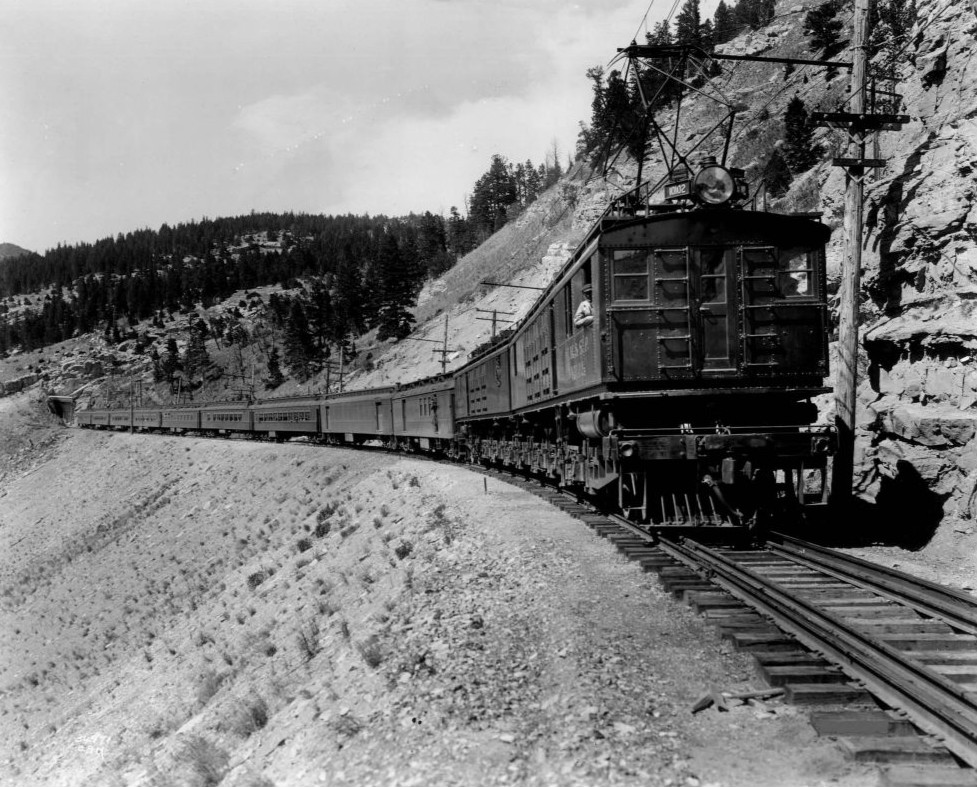
An EF-1 boxcab hauling the Olympian through Montana Canyon in 1925

Operating conditions in the mountain regions of the Pacific Extension proved difficult. Winter temperatures of −40 °F (−40 °C) in Montana made it challenging for steam locomotives to generate sufficient steam. The line snaked through mountainous areas, resulting in "long steep grades and sharp curves". Electrification provided an answer, especially with abundant hydroelectric power in the mountains, and a ready source of copper in Anaconda, Montana. Between 1914 and 1916, the Milwaukee Road implemented a 3,000 volt direct current (DC) overhead system between Harlowton, Montana, and Avery, Idaho, a distance of 438 miles (705 km). Pleased with the result, the Milwaukee electrified its route in Washington between Othello and Tacoma, a further 207 miles (333 km), between 1917 and 1920. This section traversed the Cascades through the 2 1/4-mile (3.6 km) Snoqualmie Tunnel, just south of Snoqualmie Pass and over 400 feet (120 m) lower in elevation. The single-track tunnel's east portal at Hyak included an adjacent company-owned ski area (1937−1950).

Together, the 645 miles (1,038 km) of main-line electrification represented the largest such project in the world up to that time and would not be exceeded in the US until the Pennsylvania Railroad's efforts in the 1930s. The two separate electrified districts were never unified, as the 216-mile (348 km) Idaho Division (Avery to Othello) was comparatively flat down the St. Joe River to St. Maries and through eastern Washington, and posed few challenges for steam operation. Electrification cost $27 million, but resulted in savings of over $1 million per year from improved operational efficiency.

=== Bankruptcies ===
The Chicago, Milwaukee, and Puget Sound Railway was absorbed by the parent company on January 1, 1913. The Pacific Extension, including subsequent electrification, cost the Milwaukee Road $257 million, over four times the original estimate of $60 million. To meet this cost, the Milwaukee Road sold bonds, which began coming due in the 1920s. Traffic never met projections, and by the early 1920s, the Milwaukee Road was in serious financial condition. This state was exacerbated by the railroad's purchase of several heavily indebted railroads in Indiana. The company declared bankruptcy in 1925 and reorganized as the Chicago, Milwaukee, St. Paul and Pacific Railroad in 1928. In 1927, the railroad launched its second edition of the Olympian as a premier luxury limited passenger train and opened its first railroad-owned tourist hotel, the Gallatin Gateway Inn in Montana, southwest of Bozeman, via a spur from Three Forks. In 1929, its total mileage stood at 11,248 miles (18,102 km).

The reorganized company scarcely had a chance for success before the Great Depression hit. Despite innovations such as the famous Hiawatha high-speed trains that exceeded 100 mph (160 km/h), the railroad again filed for bankruptcy in 1935. The Milwaukee Road operated under trusteeship until December 1, 1945.

During World War II, the CMStP&P sponsored one of the U.S. Army's MRS units, the 757th Railroad Shop Battalion.

=== Postwar ===
The Milwaukee Road enjoyed temporary success after World War II. Out of bankruptcy and with the wartime ban on new passenger service lifted, the company upgraded its trains. The Olympian Hiawatha began running between Chicago and the Puget Sound over the Pacific Extension in 1947, and the Twin Cities Hiawatha received new equipment in 1948. Dieselisation accelerated and was complete by 1957. In 1955, the Milwaukee Road took over from the Chicago and North Western's handling of Union Pacific's streamliner trains between Chicago and Omaha.

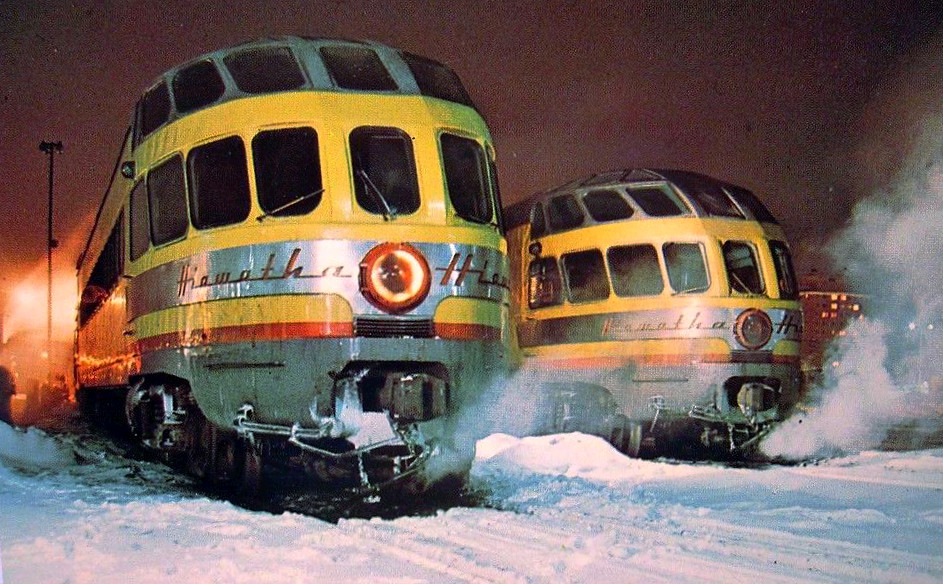
Two Skytop Lounges in their fourth Milwaukee Road paint scheme, matching Union Pacific colors

The whole railroad industry found itself in decline in the late 1950s and the 1960s, but the Milwaukee Road was hit particularly hard. The Midwest was overbuilt with a plethora of competing railroads, while the competition on the transcontinental routes to the Pacific was tough. The premier transcontinental streamliner, the Olympian Hiawatha, despite innovative scenic observation cars, was mothballed in 1961, becoming the first visible casualty. The resignation of President John P. Kiley in 1957 and his replacement with the fairly inexperienced William John Quinn was a pivotal moment. From that point onward, the road's management was fixated on merger with another railroad as the solution to the Milwaukee's problems.

Railroad mergers had to be approved by the Interstate Commerce Commission, and in 1969 the ICC effectively blocked the merger with the Chicago and North Western Railway (C&NW) that the Milwaukee Road had counted on and had been planning for since 1964. The ICC asked for terms that the C&NW was not willing to agree to. The merger of the "Hill Lines" was approved at around the same time, and the merged Burlington Northern came into being.

=== Early 1970s ===
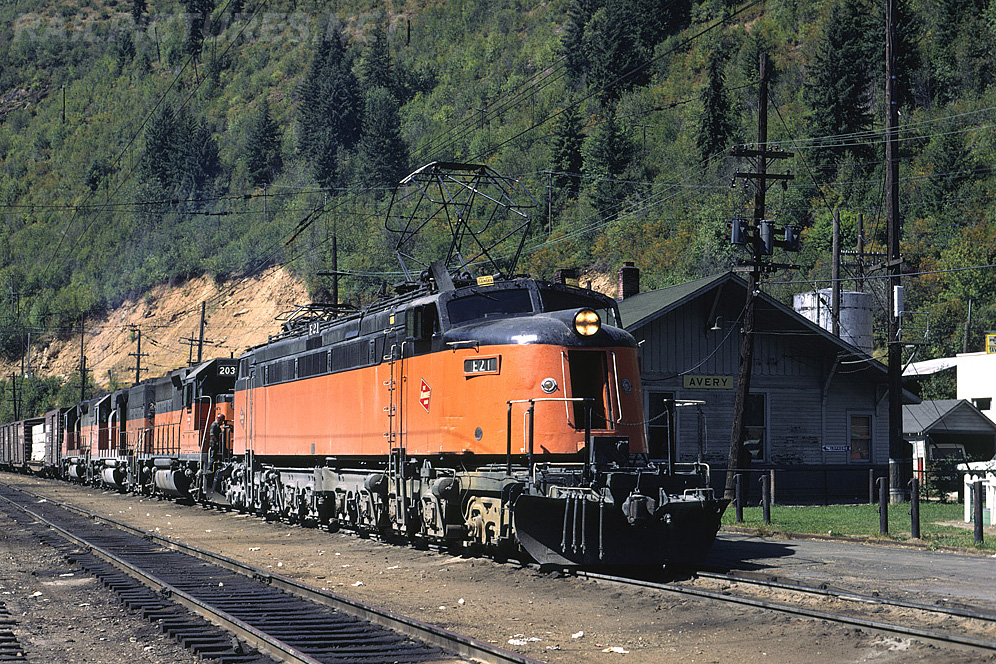
MILW E-21, a "Little Joe" electric locomotive, ready to lead an eastbound freight at Avery, Idaho in 1971

The formation of Burlington Northern in 1970 from the merger of Northern Pacific, Great Northern, Burlington Route, and the Spokane, Portland and Seattle Railway on March 3 created a stronger competitor on most Milwaukee Road routes. To boost competition, the ICC gave the Milwaukee Road the right to connect with new railroads in the West over Burlington Northern tracks. Traffic on its Pacific Extension increased substantially to more than four trains a day each way as it began interchanging cars with the Southern Pacific at Portland, Oregon and Canadian railroads at Sumas, Washington. The railroad's foothold on transcontinental traffic leaving the Port of Seattle increased such that the Milwaukee Road held a staggering advantage over BN, carrying nearly 80% of the originating traffic along with 50% of the total container traffic leaving the Puget Sound (prior to severe service declines after roughly 1974).

In 1970, the president of Chicago and North Western offered to sell the railroad to the Milwaukee Road outright. President William John Quinn refused, stating that it now believed only a merger with a larger system, not a slightly smaller one, could save the railroad. Almost immediately, the railroad filed unsuccessfully with the ICC to be included in the Union Pacific merger with the Chicago, Rock Island and Pacific Railroad.

By the mid-1970s, deferred maintenance on Milwaukee Road's physical plant, which had been increasing throughout the 1960s as it attempted to improve its financial appearance for merger, was beginning to cause problems. The railroad's financial problems were exacerbated by their practice of improving its earnings during that period by selling off its wholly owned cars to financial institutions and leasing them back. The lease charges became greater, and more cars needed to be sold to pay the lease payments. The railroad's fleet of cars was becoming older because more money was being spent on finance payments for the old cars rather than buying new ones. This contributed to car shortages that turned away business.

The Milwaukee Road chose at this time to end its mainline electrification. Its electric locomotive fleet was reaching the end of its service life, and newer diesel locomotives such as the EMD SD40-2 and the GE Universal Series were more than capable of handling the route. The final electric freight arrived at Deer Lodge, Montana on June 15, 1974.

In 1976, the Milwaukee Road exercised its right under the Burlington Northern merger to petition for inclusion based on its weak financial condition. The ICC denied it on March 2, 1977.

=== Final bankruptcy ===
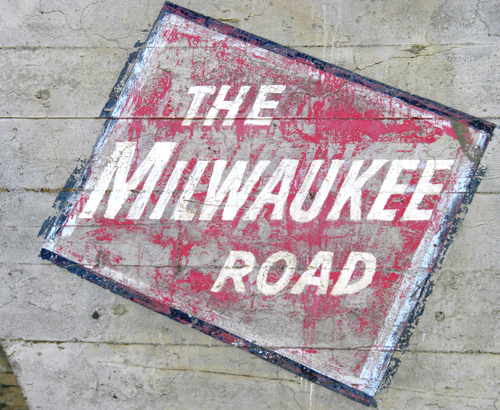
An aging Milwaukee Road logo on a trestle, still in use near Rosalia, Washington, on the Palouse to Cascades State Park Trail

Between 1974 and 1977, the Milwaukee Road lost $100 million, and the company filed for its third bankruptcy in 42 years on December 19, 1977. Judge Thomas R. McMillen presided over the bankruptcy until the Milwaukee Road's sale in 1985. The railroad's primary problem was that it possessed too much physical plant for the revenue it generated. In 1977, it owned 10,074 miles (16,213 km) of track, and 36% of that mileage produced a mere 14% of the company's yearly revenue. The approach taken by the bankruptcy trustees was to sell or abandon unprofitable or marginally profitable lines, leaving a much smaller railroad which could be profitable. Outright liquidation was considered, but not pursued.

In 1980, the secondary line between Marquette, Iowa and Rapid City, South Dakota on its section between Mitchell and Kadoka was embargoed and then acquired by the South Dakota Department of Transportation.

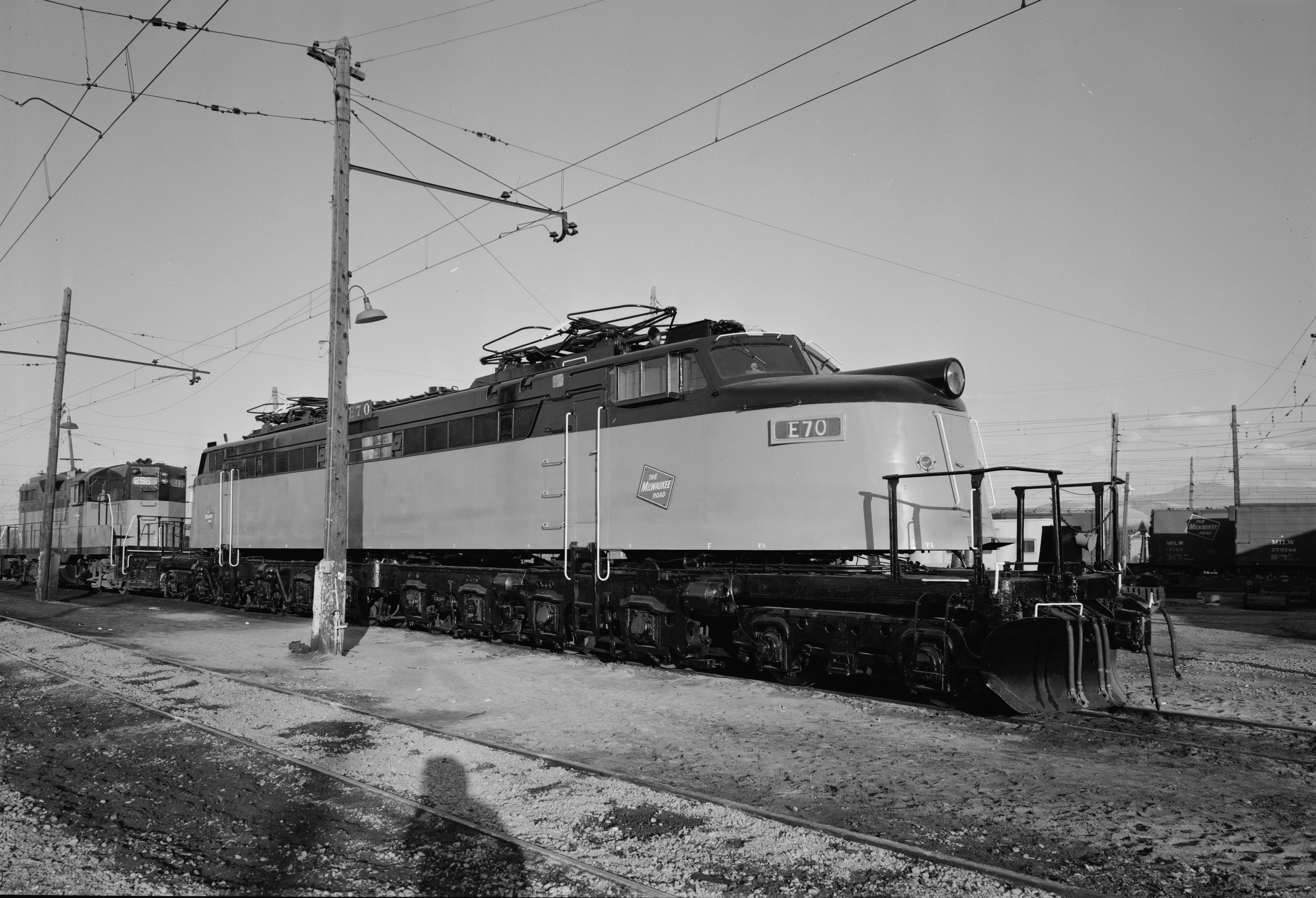
MILW "Little Joe" E-70 at Deer Lodge, Montana, in October 1974, after the end of electrified operation

Between 1977 and 1984, route distance was reduced to a quarter from its peak and a third from its total in 1977, shrinking to 3,023 miles (4,865 km). The most extensive abandonment eliminated the Milwaukee Road's transcontinental service to the West Coast. While the Burlington Northern merger generated more traffic on this route, it was only enough to wear out the deteriorating track, not enough to pay for rebuilding. This forced trains to slow at many locations due to bad track. A final attempt to devise a plan to rehabilitate the Pacific Extension under the Milwaukee Road Restructuring Act failed. Operations ended west of Miles City, Montana, on February 29, 1980. The new, smaller railroad began earning small profits in 1982 (that same year, its two commuter rail lines, collectively known as the Milwaukee District West Line and Milwaukee District North Line respectively, were turned over to the Northeast Illinois Regional Commuter Rail Corporation, a forerunner of commuter rail agency Metra). Still in reorganization, the Milwaukee Road attracted interest from three potential buyers: the Grand Trunk Corporation, the Chicago and North Western Railway, and the Soo Line Railroad. The Interstate Commerce Commission approved the offers by both Soo Line and C&NW. Ultimately, Judge McMillen approved the former's offer on February 19, 1985. The Soo reorganized the property as the Milwaukee Road, Inc., prior to merging the Milwaukee into the company itself effective January 1, 1986. The Soo Line would be acquired by Canadian Pacific in 1990 with the latter consolidating with the Kansas City Southern Railway 33 years later.

In 1982, all that remained of the main line to the Pacific to Miles City, via Aberdeen, South Dakota, along with other lines in the same state and in Montana was sold to BN.

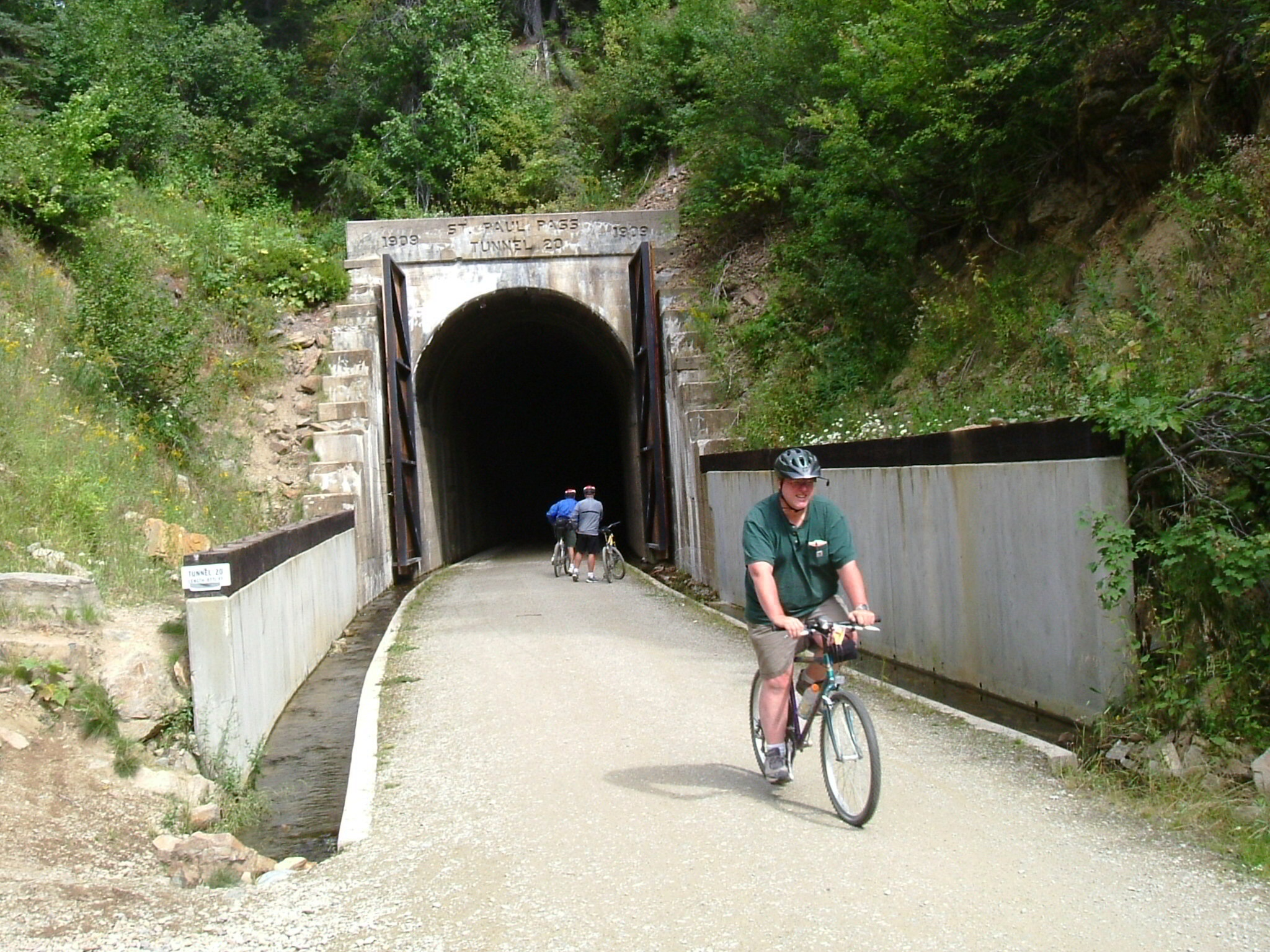
The Route of the Hiawatha Trail on the border of Montana and Idaho following the Milwaukee Road

The successor-in-interest to what remained of the Milwaukee Road after the Soo Line sale was its holding company, the Milwaukee Land Company, reverted to Chicago Milwaukee Corporation ownership (CMC). Without the railroad, CMC's primary function became disposal or redevelopment of Milwaukee Road real estate not sold to the Soo Line, which stretched from Bedford, Indiana, to Washington state. The larger properties were developed into big-box retail or industrial sites. The CMC itself was beset with legal and financial woes, filing for bankruptcy (under numerous versions of CMC/Heartland Partners), as a result of environmental cleanup costs and liabilities at former Milwaukee Road sites. CMC Heartland, and its various reincarnations, were dissolved in a final liquidation process that came to a close in 2010.

Much of the abandoned Milwaukee PCE line has become rail trails. The Palouse to Cascades State Park Trail (formerly the John Wayne Pioneer Trail) in Washington, the Milwaukee Road Rail Trail in Idaho, the Route of the Hiawatha Trail in Idaho and Montana, Route of the Olympian in Montana, the Midtown Greenway in Minnesota, the Bugline Trail in Wisconsin, and the Milwaukee Road Transportation Trailway in Indiana all run on sections of the right-of-way among others. Today, both the Milwaukee Road and Soo Line Railroad trackage make up the Midwest US routes of the CPKC.

The Pacific Extension was abandoned in 1984 and sections in Washington state were subsequently acquired by various firms. Tacoma Rail purchased all of Milwaukee's lines south of Tacoma in 1989 and leased its tracks to the Tacoma Eastern Railway Company until it took over all freight operations in 1998. The Centralia–Curtis section was acquired by Weyerhauser for their lumber operations and later leased to the Chehalis–Centralia Railroad, a heritage operator founded in 1986. The Port of Chehalis purchased the line in 1996 and sold it to the Chehalis–Centralia Railroad in 2019. A 26-mile (42 km) section from Royal Slope to Othello, Washington, was purchased by the Port of Royal Slope in 1982 and operated as the Royal Slope Railroad until it was transferred to the Washington State Department of Transportation in 1994.

Most of the surviving section of the former Milwaukee Road main line to the Pacific, from Appleton to the west, is currently operated by BNSF Railway, classified as the Appleton, Mobridge, and Hettinger Subdivisions.

Milwaukee Road Historical Association now owns the Milwaukee Road trademarks/copyrights, except for the AAR reporting marks (MILW) used by the Soo Line Railroad (which does business in the American Midwest as the Canadian Pacific Kansas City Railway).

== Passenger train service ==
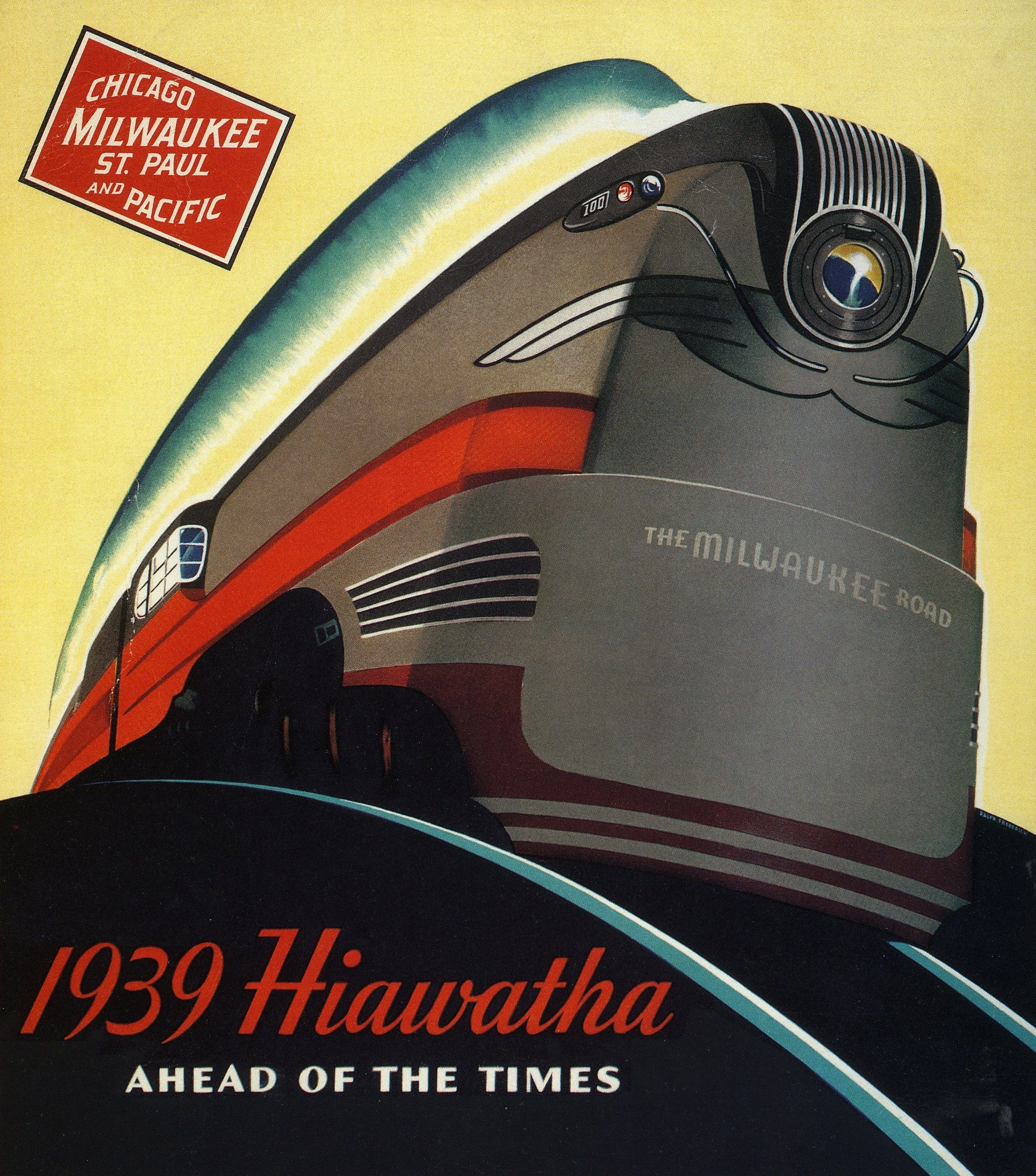
Stylized 1939 advertisement featuring a streamlined 4-6-4 class F7 steam locomotive

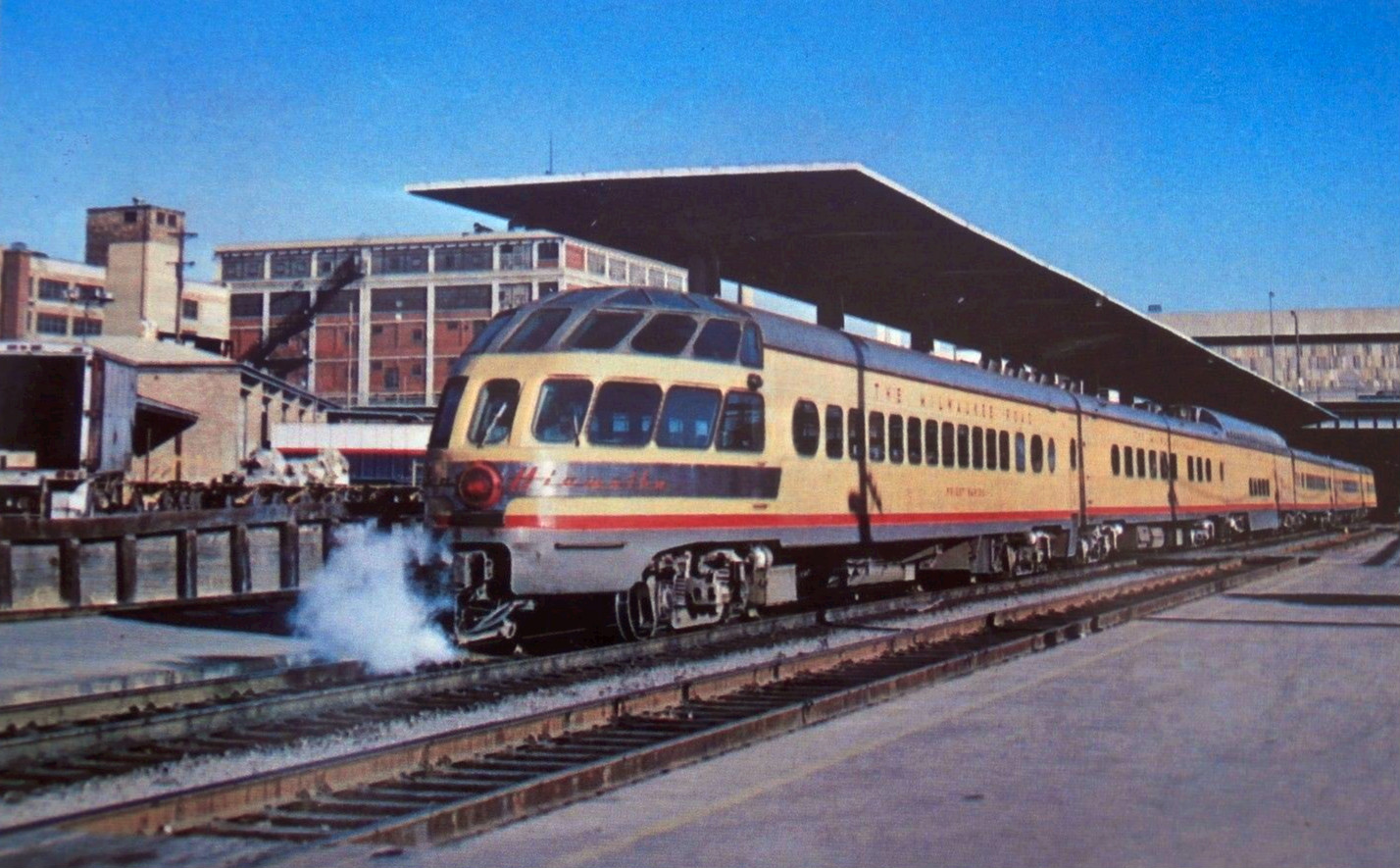
Skytop car Priest Rapids, #189, in the Union Pacific paint scheme

The Milwaukee Road aggressively marketed passenger service through much of its history, maintaining a high quality of service until the end of private intercity passenger operations in 1971. The Milwaukee prided itself on its passenger operations, providing the nation with some of its most innovative and colorful trains. The railroad's home-built equipment was among some of the best passenger equipment ever run on any American railroad. The Milwaukee's reputation for high-quality service was the principal reason that Union Pacific shifted its service to the Milwaukee Road for its "City" streamliners in 1955.

The Milwaukee Road's Pioneer Limited was one of the first named trains and its colorful Hiawatha trains were among the nation's finest streamliners. The post-World War II Hiawatha trains remain a high-water mark for passenger train industrial design.

Starting in November 1955, the Milwaukee Road assumed joint operation of the Union Pacific's City of Los Angeles, City of Portland, City of Denver, and Challenger trains as well as the UP/Southern Pacific City of San Francisco. After assuming operation of the UP's services, the Milwaukee Road gradually dropped its orange and maroon paint scheme in favor of UP's Armour yellow, grey, and red, finding the latter easier to keep clean.

The Milwaukee Road's streamlined passenger services were unique in that most of its equipment was built by the railroad at its Milwaukee Menomonee Valley shops, including the four generations of Hiawatha equipment introduced in 1933–34, 1935, 1937–38, and 1947–48. Most striking were the "Beaver Tail" observation cars of the 1930s and the "Skytop Lounge" observation cars by industrial designer Brooks Stevens in the 1940s. Extended "Skytop Lounge" cars were also ordered from Pullman for Olympian Hiawatha service in 1951. The Olympian Hiawatha set, as well as some full-length "Super Domes" were later sold to the Canadian National Railway.

The railroad operated the Olympian and later Olympian Hiawatha as its premier train on the Chicago-Puget Sound route, and for most of the same years it operated the Columbian as its secondary train on the same route.

Regional passenger trains that the Milwaukee Road operated from Chicago up to Amtrak's assumption of passenger operations in 1971 included the Twin Cities Hiawatha serving Minneapolis, the Sioux serving Madison, Wisconsin, the Milwaukee Express serving Milwaukee, and the Varsity serving Madison. Amtrak still operates several services on the Milwaukee Road's Twin Cities mainline. Daily long-distance service to and from the Pacific Northwest is provided by the Empire Builder along the Chicago-St. Paul route after the train was rerouted by Amtrak on the first day of operations on May 1, 1971. Amtrak also operates corridor services as the Hiawatha along the Chicago-Milwaukee section of the route. In 2024, Amtrak began service for the Borealis, supplementing the Empire Builder with an extra daily round trip from Chicago to St. Paul.

For years, the Milwaukee Road also operated an extensive commuter rail service in the Chicago area. One branch served the northern suburbs and extended into the outer suburbs of Milwaukee, while another branch served the western suburbs. These services passed to the Regional Transportation Authority in 1982 after the Milwaukee Road's bankruptcy. They are still operated today by Metra, Chicago's commuter rail agency, as the Milwaukee District North Line and Milwaukee District West Line. Canadian Pacific dispatches Metra trains while running freight trains on both of these lines via trackage rights.

== In popular culture ==
- The 1930 film Danger Lights was filmed in the Milwaukee Road's yard and shop at Miles City, Montana and on the main line.

== See also ==
- List of Milwaukee Road locomotives
- Chicago, Milwaukee, St. Paul and Pacific Railroad Company Historic District
- Milwaukee Road Depot
